= PY Ta 641 =

Linear B tablet made c. 1180 BCE

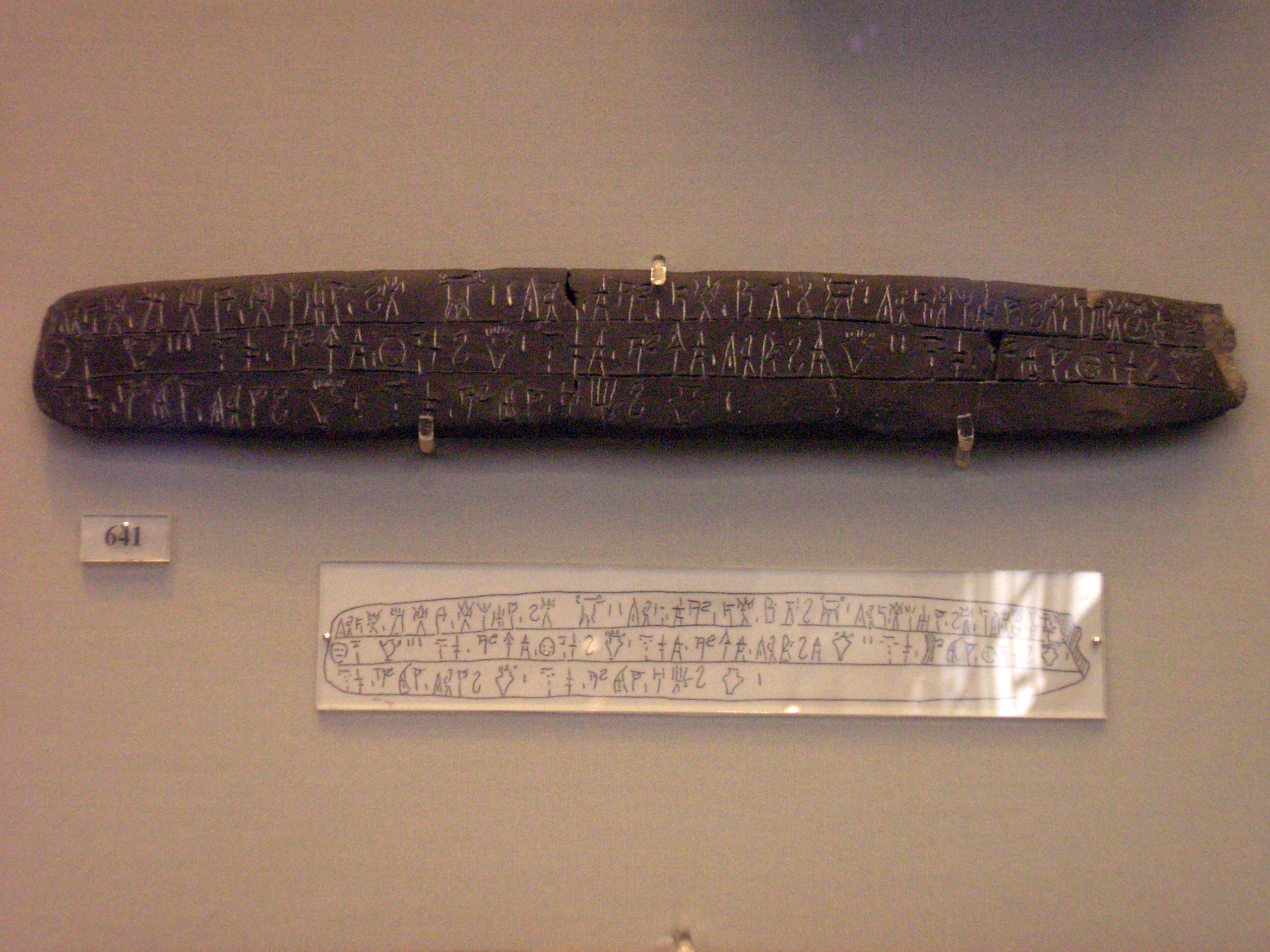
- The Linear B tablet PY Ta 641, displayed in the National Archaeological Museum of Athens
- Material: Clay
- Size: approx. 15 cm × 4 cm × 1 cm (5.91 in × 1.57 in × 0.39 in)
- Writing: Linear B script
- Created: c. 1180 BCE
- Discovered: 1952; Palace of Nestor, Pylos, Greece.
- Discovered by: Carl Blegen
- Present location: National Archaeological Museum, Athens
- Culture: Mycenaean Greece

PY Ta 641, sometimes known as the Tripod Tablet, is a Mycenaean clay tablet inscribed in Linear B, currently displayed in the National Archaeological Museum, Athens. Discovered in the so-called "Archives Complex" of the Palace of Nestor at Pylos in Messenia in June 1952 by the American archaeologist Carl Blegen, it has been described as "probably the most famous tablet of Linear B".

The tablet catalogues tripods and other vessels used in ritual feasting. It was inscribed around 1180 BCE by a senior scribe working for the palatial administration at Pylos, known to scholarship as 'Hand 2' and possibly named Phugebris (Greek: Φυγέβρις). It is categorised as a palm-leaf tablet – a relatively small tablet used to record a single entry of information – and was probably intended to act as a short-term memory aid, perhaps before its information was transferred to a more permanent means of storage, such as papyrus.

Along with all other surviving tablets from Pylos, PY Ta 641 was accidentally fired when the Palace of Nestor was burned down around 1180 BCE, less than a year after the tablet's production. It has been used as evidence for the workings of the palatial administration, as well as about feasting in the Mycenaean world and the connections between Pylos and Crete in the Late Bronze Age.

The tablet was first published after Michael Ventris proposed, in June 1952, a decipherment of Linear B and that the Mycenaean language was a dialect of Greek. PY Ta 641 includes easily-recognised ideograms depicting the vessels it describes, which closely matched the translation of the associated text predicted by Ventris's decipherment. While the facts of its discovery and translation were disputed throughout the 1950s and early 1960s, particularly by the Scottish classicist Arthur J. Beattie, the tablet provided an important early indication of the correctness of the decipherment, and contributed to its general acceptance among Anglophone scholars by the 1980s.

== Designation ==
The designation "PY Ta 641" is made up of three parts:

- PY: a site label; PY stands for Pylos.
- Ta: the "series", itself broken into a capital letter and a lower-case letter. The "T" refers to the ideograms used in the text, and was used to group the tablets before the Linear B script was deciphered. The "a" further subdivides the tablets based on their subject matter and was added after the decipherment.
- 641: an identifying number, unique within the site.

== Production ==
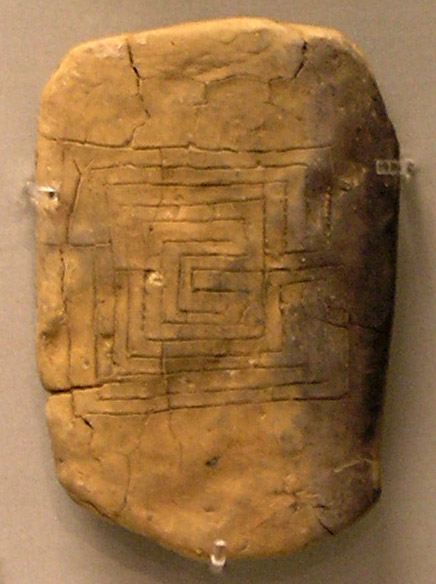
The reverse of PY Cn 1287, a page-shaped tablet found at Pylos. The scribe (known as Hand 31) has drawn a labyrinth on it.

The writers of Linear B tablets are known in scholarship as "hands", after the palaeographic method of identifying them by handwriting. They are considered to have been professional scribes. PY Ta 641 was written by Hand 2, the third-most attested author in the Pylian corpus, who was also responsible for assessments of taxation and debts (the Ma series) and of allocations of bronze (the Jn series).

Hand 2 seems to have been a senior administrator, one of four known to scholarship as "chief scribes" (Hands 1, 2, 21 and 41). They may have been subordinate to the main "archivist" (Hand 1), or may have operated separately: Evangelos Kyriakidis has suggested that Hand 2 was responsible for matters within the palace, while Hand 1 had responsibility for those outside it. In most cases, the names of the Linear B scribes are unknown. However, John Bennet has suggested that pu_{2}-ke-qi-ri (perhaps Greek: Φυγέβρις, romanized: Phugebris), an official recorded on another tablet of the same series (PY Ta 711) as carrying out an inspection of similar vessels for a festival, may also have written the tablets that documented the results of that inspection. Since PY Ta 711 was also written by Hand 2, that would make pu_{2}-ke-qi-ri the author of PY Ta 641.

Hand 2 worked primarily in an upstairs storeroom above Room 38 in the eastern part of the palace, along with Hands 4, 41 and S1203 Cii, who all recorded different types of perfumed oil – an industry with which Hand 2 was closely connected. However, Kyriakidis has described Hand 2 as "one of the most ubiquitous people in the central palatial building", since they seem to have moved around most rooms in the northern part of the palace, including the upper floor. Hand 2 may also have been responsible for the training of other, more junior scribes, who were responsible for a more limited range of activities.

It is unclear whether the writers of Linear B tablets made the tablets themselves: matching palm-prints have been found on tablets attributed to different scribal hands, suggesting that they were made by a single person but written by at least one additional person, while other tablets show evidence of being physically reworked during the writing process – for example, being squeezed so as to slightly expand the writing surface, when the scribe realised that additional space was needed.

Linear B tablets divide into larger page-shaped and smaller, wider palm-leaf tablets. PY Ta 641 is a palm-leaf tablet, which were generally used to record small amounts of information, in contrast to page-shaped tablets, which summarised multiple records. To make palm-leaf tablets, wet clay was pressed into a flat sheet, which was then folded. The left and right sides of the folded tablet were flattened, either by pushing them against a flat surface, folding them again or by pressing them between the fingers and palm to produce a narrow, rounded edge. The writing surface was then smoothed, probably by pressing it against a flat surface, and the back of the tablet, which would have joins from where the tablet had previously been folded, was itself smoothed out. In some cases, the tablet was formed around a piece of straw or string, which helped to keep it together if it were later broken.

=== Preservation ===
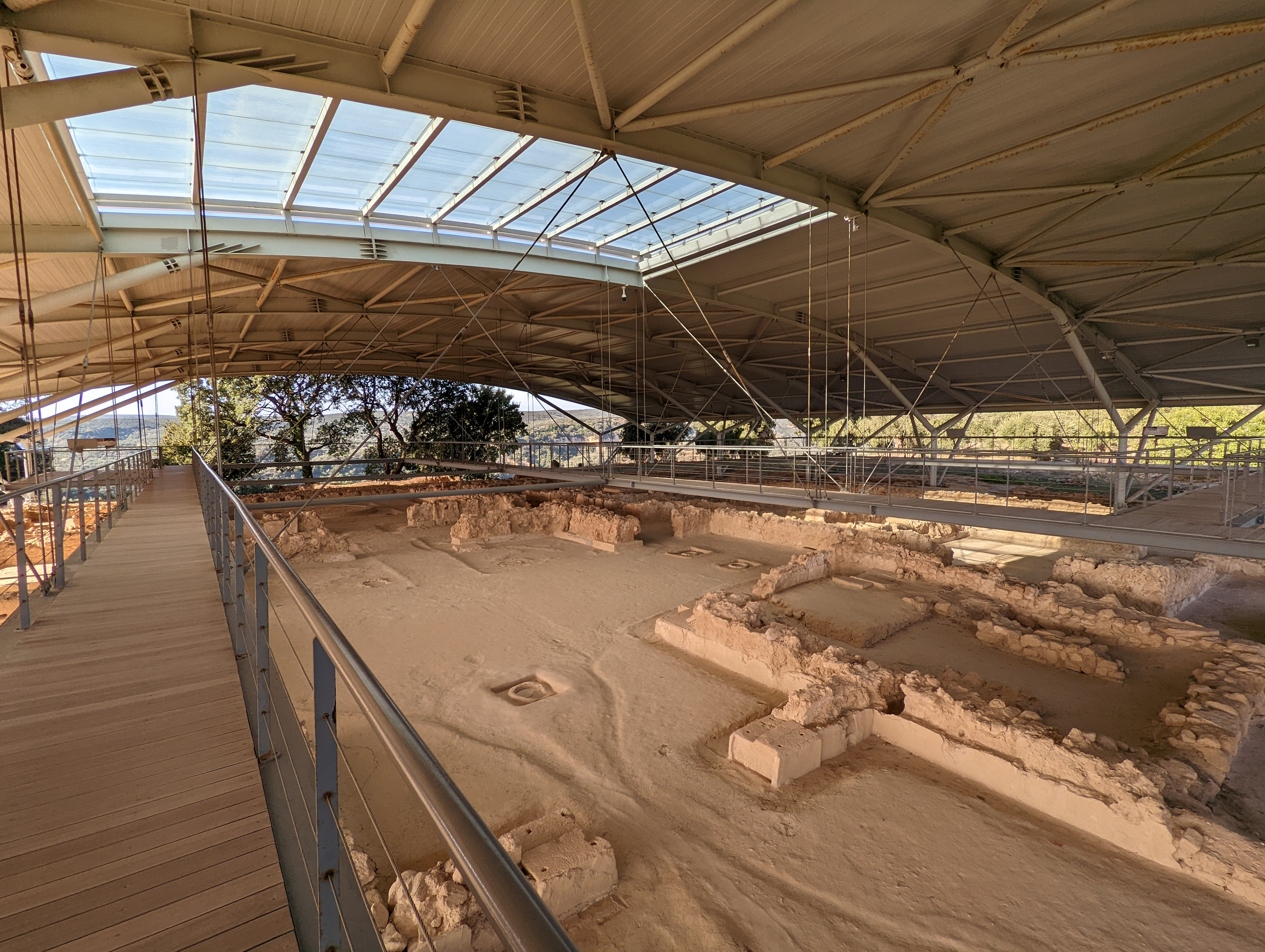
The remains of the Palace of Nestor at Pylos, Messenia, where the tablet was discovered in 1952

Linear B tablets were not intended for long-term storage or use, but primarily used as short-term aides-memoire. They were retained for at most a year, as evidenced by the frequent use of words like za-we-te ('this year') and pe-ru-si-nu-wo ('last year'). It has been suggested that their contents were, in normal circumstances, transferred to other materials such as papyrus for long-term storage. It is thought that the clay tablets would normally have been discarded after such a transfer was complete, and in any case that they were not generally intended to be archived or kept for an extended period: indeed, the site of Pylos is unusual in providing evidence for the systematic sorting and storage of these tablets.

Linear B tablets were not intentionally fired, but were left to dry in the sun. Those Linear B tablets which survive today were accidentally burned during the destruction of the palace in which they happened to be: in the case of Pylos, this destruction happened late in the LH IIIB period, around the transition to LH IIIC (that is, c. 1200 – c. 1180 BCE). Given that the tablets were normally retained for less than a year, it can be inferred that this destruction took place within months of the creation of PY Ta 641.

== Text and translation ==
The tablet catalogues drinking and storage vessels from the palace at Pylos. A transcription and translation is given below: (Note: The translation follows Ventris and Chadwick 2015. For the inscription in full epigraphic format, with bibliography, see Aurora 2015.)

𐀐𐀩𐁀 𐃠
ke-re-a_{2}, *2̣0̣1̣VAS[
the legs [up]: a tripod.

𐀴𐀪𐀡𐀆 𐁁𐀑𐀄 𐀐𐀩𐀯𐀍 𐀸𐀐 𐃠 𐄈 𐀴𐀪𐀡 𐀁𐀕 𐀡𐀆 𐀃𐀺𐀸 𐃠 𐄇 𐀴𐀪𐀡 𐀐𐀩𐀯𐀍 𐀸𐀐 𐀀𐀢 𐀐𐀏𐀄𐀕𐀜
ti-ri-po-de, a_{3}-ke-u, ke-re-si-jo, we-ke *201VAS 2 ti-ri-po, e-me, po-de, o-wo-we *201VAS 1 ti-ri-po, ke-re-si-jo, we-ke, a-pu, ke-ka-u-me-ṇọ[
Tripods, Aikeu, (Note: The interpretation of this word, in the nominative case, is obscure: it is generally held to be a proper noun.) of Cretan workmanship: 2 tripods; a tripod with one foot and one hand: 1 tripod; a tripod of Cretan workmanship burnt from

𐀤𐀵 𐃢 𐄉 𐀇𐀞 𐀕𐀿𐀁 𐀤𐀵𐀫𐀸 𐃡 𐄇 𐀇𐀞 𐀕𐀿𐀁 𐀴𐀪𐀃𐀸𐀁 𐃡 𐄈 𐀇𐀞 𐀕𐀹𐀍 𐀤𐀵𐀫𐀸 𐃡 𐄇
qe-to *203VAS 3 di-pa, me-zo-e, qe-to-ro-we *202VAS 1 di-pa-e, me-zo-e, ti-ri-o-we-e *202VAS 2 di-pa, me-wi-jo, qe-to-ro-we *202VAS 1
wine-jars: 3 jars; a vessel of larger size with four handles: one vessel; vessels of larger size, with three handles: two vessels; a vessel of smaller size, with four handles: one vessel.

𐀇𐀞 𐀕𐀹𐀍 𐀴𐀪𐀍𐀸 𐃡 𐄇 𐀇𐀞 𐀕𐀹𐀍 𐀀𐀜𐀸 𐃡 𐄇
di-pa, me-wi-jo, ti-ri-jo-we *202VAS 1 di-pa, me-wi-jo, a-no-we *202VAS 1
a vessel of smaller size, with three handles: one vessel; a vessel of smaller size, without handles: one vessel.

== Interpretation ==
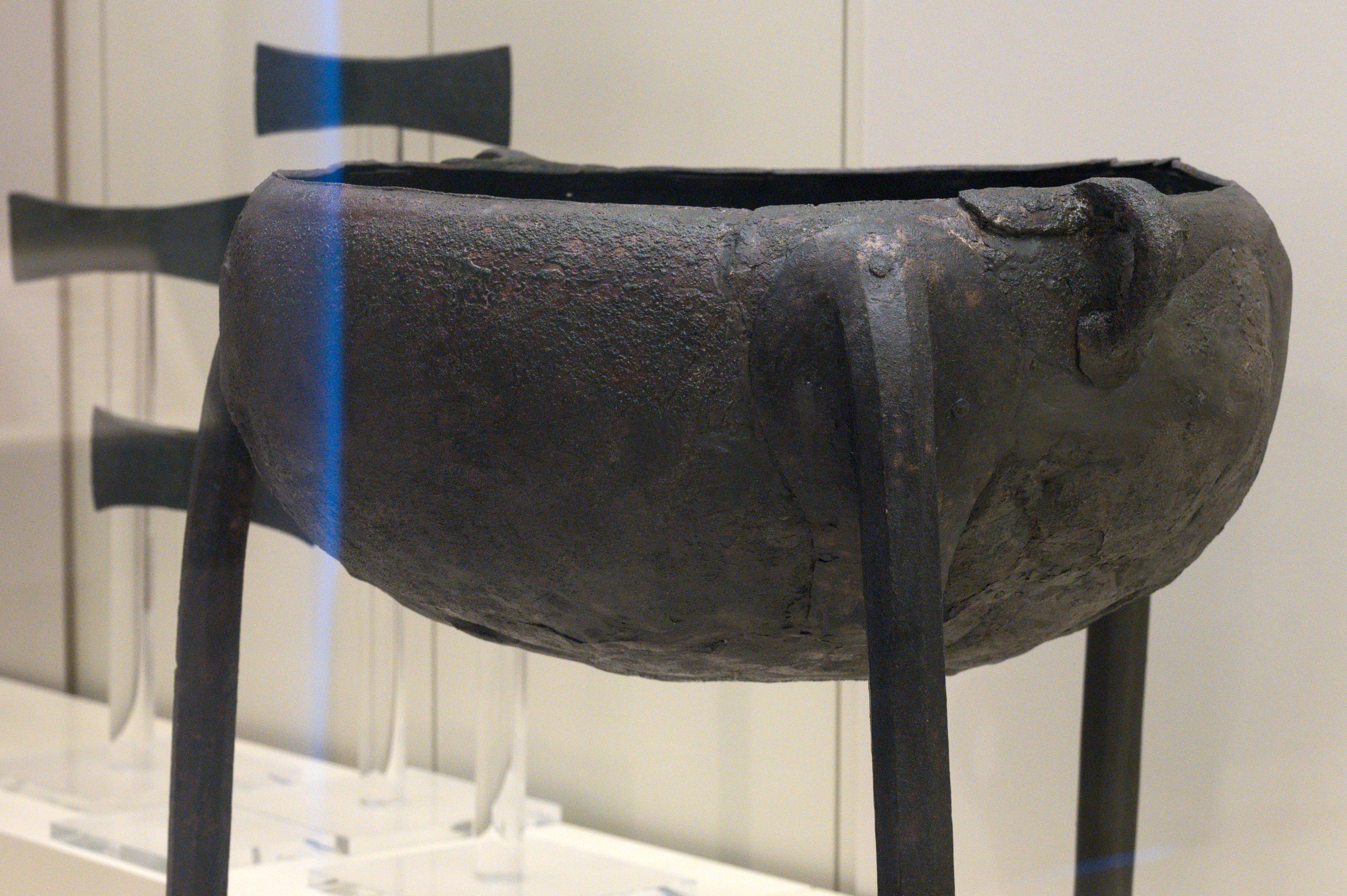
A bronze tripod cauldron from Mycenae, used in the LH IIIC period – approximately contemporary with the destruction of the palace at Pylos and the writing of PY Ta 641

PY Ta 641 catalogues an inventory of luxury items, specifically tripods and other vessels. It forms part of the Ta series, which catalogue similar luxury items – furniture, metal vessels and sacrificial implements – of which Hand 2 made an account when the ruler (wanax) of Pylos appointed a man named Augēwās (Note: Written in Linear B syllabograms as au-ke-wa, reconstructed as Ancient Greek: Αὐγῆϝας, romanized: Augewas.) as a provincial governor (damokoros). (Note: Written in Linear B syllabograms as da-mo-ko-ro, reconstructed as Ancient Greek: δαμοκόρος, romanized: damokoros.) These items were to be used in what Thomas Palaima calls "a ceremonial and ritually important banqueting ceremony": Dimitri Nakassis has suggested that this may have been a feast to celebrate or commemorate Augēwās's appointment.

It has also been suggested that the broken vessels may have been recorded on the tablet so that they could be repaired, mirroring the tentative evidence for the repair of armour using new pieces of metal in other Pylian tablets. The attention to detail paid by Hand 2 in recording the quantities, shapes and conditions of vessels has been taken as evidence for the concern paid by the palatial administration to the accuracy of this inventory, as well as for the expertise of Mycenaean scribes in such matters. The record of tripods of "Cretan workmanship" indicates trade connections between Pylos and Crete in the LH IIIB period.

Yves Duhoux has used the relative success with which PY Ta 641 renders a text with a high "social level" (that is, a rich, specialised vocabulary) as evidence for the flexibility of the Linear B script, and its suitability for much longer texts with broader functions than the accounting notes preserved in the surviving tablets.

== Discovery ==
The first Linear B tablets from Pylos were discovered on 3 April 1939, during excavations led by the American archaeologist Carl Blegen and the Greek Konstantinos Kourouniotis. These were the first Linear B tablets discovered on the mainland of Greece; all previous finds had taken place on Crete. The excavation's first trench happened upon an area later known as the Archives Complex, which contained over 600 tablets and fragments. Bill McDonald, who was supervising the digging, spent several days along with Blegen excavating them by hand.

The outbreak of the Second World War suspended excavations at Pylos until 1952. PY Ta 641 was discovered in the same year, in two parts: the first was found on 4 June, and the second on 10 June. The tablet was found in what Blegen called the "chasm", an area running along the right-hand edge of the Archives Complex. This area was filled with loose earth and stones which Blegen considered to be the remains of a wall, dismantled at some point between the medieval and modern period. The "chasm" itself contained around thirty to forty tablets, and a further forty fragments of tablets were found in an extension of the cutting beyond where Blegen considered the original wall to have been.

Along with the rest of the Ta series, PY Ta 641 was found in an area of the Archives Complex used to house tablets which had not yet been processed and filed, making it likely one of the last tablets to enter the archives at Pylos. After being excavated, it was coated in lime, stored in a locked box and transported in late July to Athens. The tablet would not be cleaned sufficiently to make it legible until 1953, at which point the first photographs of it were taken.

== Role in the decipherment of Linear B ==
=== The discovery and classification of Linear B (1886–1909) ===
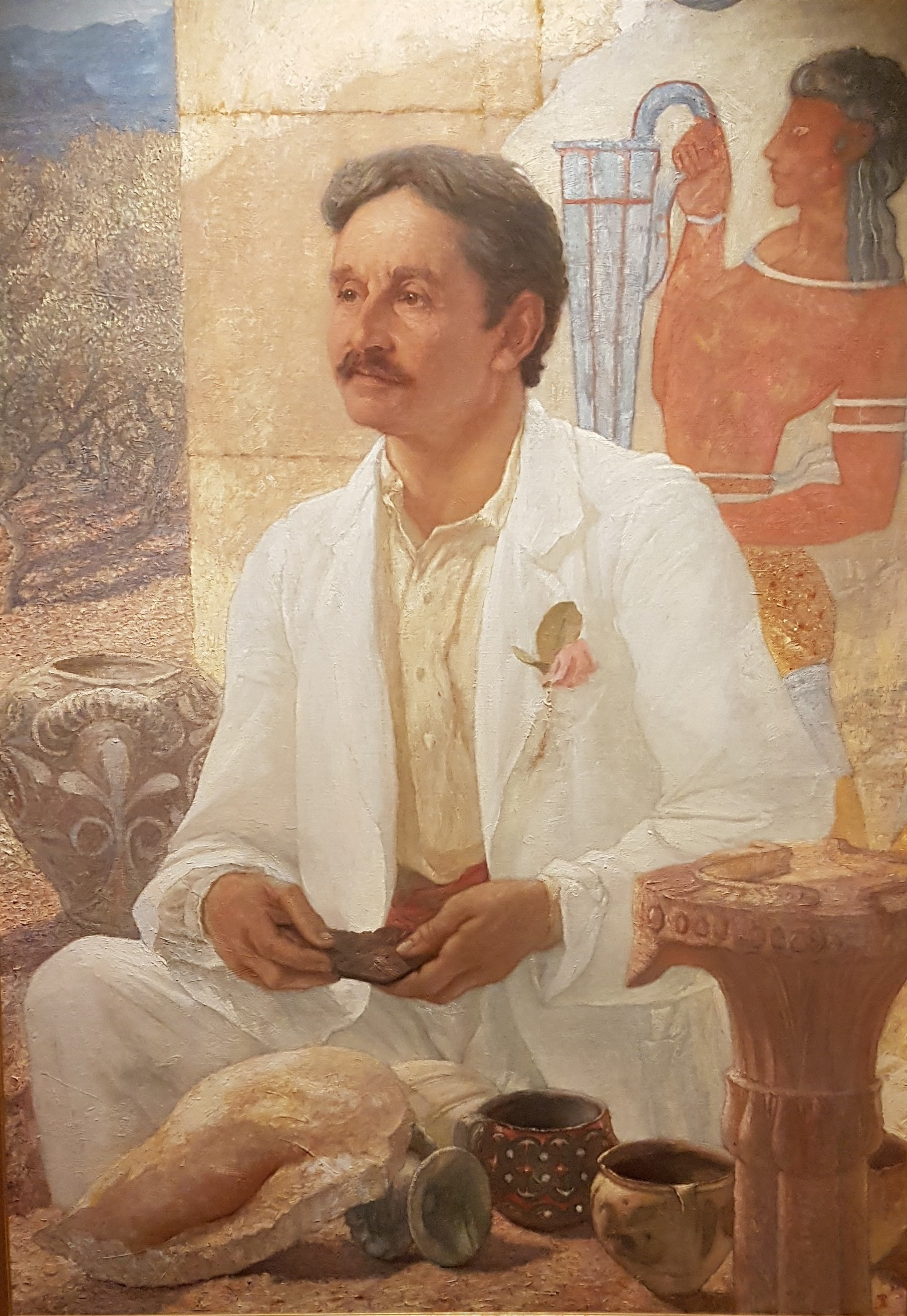
Arthur Evans, painted in 1907 by William Richmond among the ruins and finds from Knossos

Linear B was first identified as a writing system by Arthur Evans, who excavated the first Linear B tablet at Knossos on Crete on 30 March 1900. By the end of the year, he had categorised the writing system of the tablets as a "linear script", as opposed to what he called the "hieroglyphic or conventionalized pictographic script" now known as Cretan hieroglyphs, and correctly realised that it was written from left to right. He categorised its signs as "for the most part syllabic", though asserted that "a certain number are unquestionably ideographic or determinative."

In 1909, Evans published the first volume of Scripta Minoa, which included the then-unpublished Phaistos Disc, which had been discovered in July 1908, and similarly-unpublished tablets excavated by Federico Halbherr from Hagia Triada. Evans named the script of these tablets "Class A" and that of the Knossos tablets "Class B".

=== Decipherment (1909–1952) ===
Most of the Knossos tablets, which numbered around 3500, remained unpublished in Scripta Minoa I. Evans published a selection of them in 1935, allowing serious efforts at decipherment to begin. To these were added, after 1939, the first tablets excavated at Pylos. The later decipherers John Chadwick and Michael Ventris, however, considered little of the work done towards a decipherment before 1944 to be of substantial value.

Building on important work by Arthur Cowley and later by Alice Kober, the decipherment of Linear B was completed by Michael Ventris between 1940 and 1952, with a particular "critical period" between 1948 and 18 June 1952. On 1 June, Ventris published a 'Work Note' to a group of Mycenaean scholars arguing that Linear B was used to write Greek. On 18 June, he wrote a letter to Emmett L. Bennett Jr., including the line "I think I've deciphered Linear B". In this letter, Ventris restated his conviction that the language of Linear B was Greek, and gave an account of some of its spelling rules and of certain transliterations between Classical Greek and Linear B. On 1 July, he announced the decipherment on BBC Radio 3.

=== The role of PY Ta 641 in proving the decipherment ===
Variants of the Linear B ideogram *202VAS used on the tablet PY Ta 641, with the Linear B adjective used for each. The correspondence between these symbols and adjectives was crucial evidence in favour of Ventris and Chadwick's decipherment of Linear B, which was published before they were able to view this tablet.

Ventris's announcement was largely met with scepticism from the scholarly community, including from John Chadwick, who later wrote that he had been "completely taken aback" by the idea that Linear B had been used to write Greek, which he had considered "preposterous". In particular, scholars such as Bennett worried about the possibility of circular reasoning: since Ventris had not tested his decipherment on any unseen material, it would have been possible for him to shape his solution in order to fit the available data, whether or not it was correct.

On 16 May 1953, Blegen sent Ventris a copy of PY Ta 641, in which he drew attention to the correspondence between the ideograms used for vases on the tablet and the corresponding adjectives given by reading the tablet with Ventris's values for the syllabograms. In his letter, he wrote "all this seems too good to be true. Is coincidence excluded?"

By early July, Chadwick had obtained a copy of Ventris's decipherment from R. A. B. Mynors, and become convinced of its accuracy. On 13 July, he wrote to Ventris, offering his help as a "mere philologist" in charting the development of the Greek language between Mycenaean and the better-known Archaic and Classical dialects. Another early sceptic of the idea that Linear B encoded Greek, Sterling Dow, changed his mind by October 1952 after Ventris and Bennett shared with him the news of PY Ta 641: he was particularly influenced by the fact that Ventris had completed his decipherment before seeing the tablet, and that Blegen had been the only person to see the tablet when he had used Ventris's sign-values to read it. Chadwick is quoted as saying "Greeks should be grateful to this tiny piece of charred clay, because it proved that the Linear B language is Greek."

=== Objections to Ventris's decipherment ===
By April 1954, when both Ventris and Dow wrote articles in The New York Times publicising the decipherment, most Anglophone scholars accepted it as correct. A minority, notably Chadwick's former lecturer Arthur J. Beattie – then in post at the University of Edinburgh – continued to doubt its validity. Shortly after Ventris's death in 1956, Beattie published an article in The Journal of Hellenic Studies which conceded that "this text [PY Ta 641] has probably done more than anything else to convince classical scholars that Mr. Ventris's decipherment is right." Beattie argued that "the apparent correspondence between words and ideograms is due to chance", and an artefact of the multiple possibilities offered by Ventris for the pronunciation of each Linear B sign.

Chadwick responded to Beattie's article in 1957, with a riposte, later described as "brief but effective", in the same journal. He rejected Beattie's objections, wrote of the "rapidity and unanimity" with which the decipherment had been accepted among the scholarly community, and concluded with "Professor Beattie underestimates the size of the windmill at which he is tilting." In 1958, Beattie alleged that Ventris had seen a copy or photograph of PY Ta 641 before finalising his decipherment, and then fraudulently presented the tablet as independent evidence of its validity. Blegen, however, affirmed that the tablet had been locked away until late July, after Ventris had stated his conviction of the Greek solution to Linear B in June, and had remained illegible until the following year. Finally, in 1959, Beattie claimed that Ventris had seen, and subsequently destroyed, a similar tablet to PY Ta 641 prior to making his decipherment – a claim which the Mycenaean philologists John Killen and Anna Morpurgo Davies later described as "outrageous".

Beattie's arguments attracted only small-scale support, primarily in Scotland. By 1960, English-speaking scholars generally accepted the decipherment, though the pro-decipherment linguist Leonard Palmer wrote in 1965 of widespread "agnosticism" as to whether the matter could be considered proven. It remained more controversial among continental European scholars, such as the German philologist Ernst Grumach and the Belgian Byzantinist Henri Grégoire, who disputed it into the 1960s. By the 1980s, the decipherment was almost universally accepted, though it continued to be controversial in German-speaking scholarship until the early 1990s.

== Bibliography ==
- Aurora, Frederico (2015). "PY Ta(-) 641 (Chasm;2)". DAMOS (Database of Mycenaean at Oslo). Archived from the original on 29 January 2023.
- Bartoněk, Antonín (2003). Handbuch des mykenischen Griechisch (in German). Heidelberg: Winter. ISBN 9783825314354.
- Beattie, Arthur J. (1956). "Mr. Ventris' Decipherment of the Minoan Linear B Script". The Journal of Hellenic Studies. 76: 1–17. doi:10.2307/629549. JSTOR 629549. S2CID 161506588.
- Bennet, John (2001). "Agency and Bureaucracy: Thoughts on the Nature and Extent of Administration at Bronze-Age Pylos". In Voutsaki, Sofia; Killen, John (eds.). Economy and Politics in the Mycenaean Palatial States. Cambridge Philological Society. pp. 25–37. ISBN 9780906014264.
- Blegen, Carl (1953). "The Palace of Nestor Excavations at Pylos, 1952". American Journal of Archaeology. 57 (2): 59–64. doi:10.2307/501233. JSTOR 501233. S2CID 191409796.
- Chadwick, John (1957). "Minoan Linear B: A Reply". Journal of Hellenic Studies. 77 (2): 202–204. doi:10.2307/629358. JSTOR 629358. S2CID 162395268.
- Chadwick, John (1999). "Linear B: Past, Present, and Future". In Deger-Jalkotzy, Sigrid; Hiller, Stefan; Panagl, Oswald (eds.). Floreant studia Mycenaea: Akten des X. Internationalen Mykenologischen Colloquiums in Salzburg vom 1.–5. Mai 1995. Vienna: Austrian Academy of Sciences. pp. 29–38. ISBN 9783700127871.
- Colvin, Stephen (2014). A Brief History of Ancient Greek. Chichester: Wiley. ISBN 9781405149259.
- Deger-Jalkotzy, Sigrid (1996). "On the Negative Aspects of the Mycenaean Palace System". In de Miro, Ernesto; Godart, Louis; Sacconi, Anna (eds.). Atti e memorie del secondo Congresso internazionale di micenologia, Roma-Napoli, 14–20 ottobre 1991 (PDF). Vol. 2. Rome: Incunabula Graeca. pp. 715–728. Archived from the original (PDF) on 3 March 2023.
- Dow, Sterling (1954). "Minoan Writing". American Journal of Archaeology. 58 (2): 77–129. doi:10.2307/500110. JSTOR 500110. S2CID 245265302.
- Duhoux, Yves (2011). "How Were the Mycenaean Scribes Taught?". In Kyriakidis, Evangelos (ed.). Proceedings of the International Colloquium 'The inner workings of Mycenaean bureaucracy', University of Kent, Canterbury, 19-21 September 2008. pp. 95–118.
- Evans, Arthur J. (1900). "Crete: Systems of Writing". Journal of the Anthropological Institute of Great Britain and Ireland. XXX (New Series, III) (90): 91–93. doi:10.2307/2842725. JSTOR 2842725.
- Evans, Arthur J. (1901). "Knossos: Summary Report of the Excavations in 1900: I: The Palace". The Annual of the British School at Athens. 6: 3–70. doi:10.1017/S0068245400001908. JSTOR 30096250. S2CID 192983595.
- Evans, Arthur J. (1909). Scripta Minoa: The Written Documents of Minoan Crete: With Special Reference to the Archives of Knossos. Vol. I: The Hieroglyphic and Primitive Linear Classes with an Account of the Discovery of the Pre-Phoenician Scripts, their Place in Minoan Story and their Mediterranean Relations: with Plates, Tables and Figures in the Text. Oxford: The Clarendon Press.
- Haskell, Halford W. (2004). "Wanax to Wanax: Regional Trade Patterns in Mycenaean Crete". Hesperia Supplements. 33: 151–160. JSTOR 1354067.
- Horrocks, Geoffrey (2014). Greek: A History of the Language and Its Speakers. Chichester: Wiley. ISBN 9781118785157.
- Judson, Anna P. (2017). "The Decipherment: People, Process, Challenges". In Galanakis, Yannis; Christophilopoulou, Anastasia; Grime, James (eds.). Codebreakers and Groundbreakers. Cambridge: Fitzwilliam Museum. pp. 15–29. ISBN 978-1-910731-09-3.
- Judson, Anna P. (7 September 2019). "Tripods, Tables, and Tablets – Or, How to Prepare for a Mycenaean Feast". It's All Greek To Me. Archived from the original on 3 March 2023.
- Judson, Anna P. (2020). The Undeciphered Signs of Linear B: Interpretation and Scribal Practices. Cambridge University Press. doi:10.1017/9781108859745. ISBN 9781108859745.
- Judson, Anna P. (2022a). "Learning to Spell in Linear B: Orthography and Scribal Training in Mycenaean Pylos". The Cambridge Classical Journal. 68: 133–163. doi:10.1017/S1750270522000057.
- Judson, Anna P. (22 September 2022). "Making Linear B Tablets". www.bsa.ac.uk. The British School at Athens. Archived from the original on 28 February 2023.
- Kaczmarek, Beata (2016). ""Recycling" of Raw Materials 1500 Years BC" (PDF). Journal of Young Scientist. 4: 39–40. ISSN 2344-1283.
- Karagianni, Angeliki (2015). "Linear B Administration: The Communicative Aspects of Written Media and the Organisation of the Mycenaean Bureaucracy". In Sauer, Rebecca; Enderwitz, Susanne (eds.). Communication and Materiality: Written and Unwritten Communication in Pre-Modern Societies. Berlin: De Gruyter. pp. 25–60. doi:10.1515/9783110371758. ISBN 9783110413007.
- Kenanidis, Ioannis K. (2019). "Reading 'KERESIJO WEKE' and Other Designations of Tripods on Mycenaean Tablets". Humanities and Social Science Research. 2 (1): 35. doi:10.30560/hssr.v2n1p35. S2CID 188082500.
- Killen, John; Morpurgo Davies, Anna (2002). "John Chadwick (1920–1998)" (PDF). Proceedings of the British Academy. 115: 133–165. Archived from the original (PDF) on 3 December 2022.
- Kourouniotis, Konstantinos; Blegen, Carl (1939). "Excavations at Pylos, 1939". American Journal of Archaeology. 43 (4): 557–576. doi:10.2307/498982. JSTOR 498982. S2CID 193102694.
- Kyriakidis, Evangelos (1998). "Some Aspects of the Role of Scribes in Pylian Palace Administration". Minos. 31–32: 201–229.
- Kyriakidis, Evangelos (2011). "The Smell of Big Cheese: Perfume Production and the Differing Spheres of Influence of High Scribes H1 and H2 at Pylos". In Kyriakidis, Evangelos (ed.). The Inner Workings of Mycenaean Bureaucracy: Proceedings of the International Colloquium University of Kent, Canterbury, 19-21 September 2008. Rome: Fabrizio Serra editore. pp. 127–139.
- Mountjoy, Penelope Ann (1997). "The Destruction of the Palace at Pylos Reconsidered". The Annual of the British School at Athens. 92: 109–137. doi:10.1017/S0068245400016658. JSTOR 30103480. S2CID 161404282.
- Nakassis, Dimitri (2012). "Prestige and Interest: Feasting and the King at Mycenaean Pylos". Hesperia. 81 (1): 1–30. doi:10.2972/hesperia.81.1.0001. JSTOR 10.2972/hesperia.81.1.0001. S2CID 163688093.
- National Archaeological Museum (2019). "Linear B Tablet, Known as the Tripod tablet. Palace of Ano Englianos (Pylos)". National Archaeological Museum, Athens. Archived from the original on 7 December 2022.
- Olsen, Barbara (2014). Women in Mycenaean Greece: The Linear B Tablets from Pylos and Knossos. Abingdon: Taylor & Francis. ISBN 9781317747956.
- Palaima, Thomas G.; Wright, James C. (1985). "Ins and Outs of the Archives Rooms at Pylos: Form and Function in a Mycenaean Palace". American Journal of Archaeology. 89 (2): 251–262. doi:10.2307/504328. JSTOR 504328. S2CID 194067974. Archived from the original on 3 March 2023.
- Palaima, Thomas G. (1985). "Appendix". In Sjőquist (ed.). Pylos: Palmprints and Palmleaves (PDF). Archived from the original (PDF) on 16 February 2023.
- Palaima, Thomas G. (1991). "Maritime Matters in the Linear B Texts". In Laffineur, Robert; Basch, Lucien (eds.). Thalassa: L'Égée préhistorique et la mer. Actes de la troisième Rencontre égéenne internationale de l'Université de Liège (Aegaeum 7) (PDF). University of Liège. pp. 273–310. ISBN 9781991048011. Archived from the original (PDF) on 11 November 2022.
- Palaima, Thomas G. (1993). "Michael Ventris's Blueprint" (PDF). Discovery: Research and Scholarship at the University of Texas at Austin. 13: 20–26. Archived from the original (PDF) on 1 November 2022.
- Palaima, Thomas G. (1995). "The Last Days of the Pylos Polity". In Laffineur, Robert; Niemeier, Wolf-Dietrich (eds.). Politeia: State and Society in the Aegean Bronze Age. University of Liège. pp. 623–634.
- Palaima, Thomas G. (2011). "Scribes, Scribal Hands and Paleography". In Duhoux, Yves; Morpurgo Davies, Anna (eds.). A Companion to Linear B: Mycenaean Greek Texts and their World. Vol. 2. Louvain: Peeters. pp. 33–136. ISBN 978-9042924031.
- Palaima, Thomas G. (2012). "Linear B". In Cline, Eric (ed.). The Oxford Companion to the Bronze Age Aegean. Oxford University Press. pp. 356–372. ISBN 9780199873609.
- Palmer, Leonard R. (1965). Mycenaeans and Minoans: Aegean Prehistory in the Light of the Linear B Tablets (2nd ed.). London: Faber. ISBN 9780571062546.
- Tomas, Helena (2013). "Saving on Clay: The Linear B Practice of Cutting Tablets". In Piquette, Kathryn E.; Whitehouse, Ruth D. (eds.). Writing as Material Practice: Substance, Surface and Medium. London: Ubiquity Press. pp. 175–191. doi:10.5334/bai.i. ISBN 9781909188242.
- Tracy, Stephen V. (2018). "The Acceptance of the Greek Solution for Linear B". Hesperia. 87 (1): 1–16. doi:10.2972/hesperia.87.1.0001. JSTOR 10.2972/hesperia.87.1.0001. S2CID 186486561.
- Vallance Janke, Richard (2014). "An Archaeologist's Translation of Pylos Tablet Ta 641-1952 (Ventris), with an Introduction to Supersyllabograms in the Vessels and Pottery Sector in Mycenaean Linear B" (PDF). Archaeology and Science. 10: 133–162. Archived from the original (PDF) on 16 July 2021.
- Ventris, Michael; Chadwick, John (2015) [1956]. Documents in Mycenaean Greek (2 ed.). Cambridge University Press. ISBN 9781107503410.
- Young, Douglas (1965). "Is Linear B Deciphered?". Arion: A Journal of Humanities and the Classics. 4 (3): 512–542. JSTOR 20162981.
