= Antonín Bartoněk =

Czech linguist and professor

Antonín Bartoněk (October 29, 1926 in Brno - May 30, 2016 Brno) was a Czech classical philologist and a specialist in Mycenaean studies.

Bartoněk studied classical philology at the Masaryk University in Brno. Since his graduation in 1952, he worked at this university, first as an assistant, since 1962 as a lecturer, and since 1968 as a professor. Since 1990 he has also taught as a professor at the Palacký University in Olomouc. At the Universities of Vienna, Heidelberg, Graz, Amsterdam and Cambridge, he took on long-term visiting professorships.

Most of Bartoněk's published research was dedicated to Mycenaean studies and Greek linguistics. He was one of the leading experts in the deciphering and development of Linear B texts as well as in the field of ancient Greek dialects. His major work is the Handbuch des mykenischen Griechisch (Handbook of Mycenaean Greek, 2003).

Before the fall of the Iron Curtain he was one of the few scholars of the Eastern Bloc active in this field of research. Despite obvious difficulties he maintained contacts with leading Western colleagues. Noteworthy is a postcard he received from John Chadwick: it had passed the border controls, though it was written entirely in the Linear B script.

Bartoněk was also editor of a cultural guide to the Austrian-Czech border area (including the Waldviertel/the Forest Quarter and Weinviertel/the Wine Quarter).

== Selected publications ==
In German and English

- (Hrsg.): Studia Mycenaea. Proceedings of the Mycenaean symposium, Brno April 1966. Universita J. E. Purkyně, Brünn 1968 (Opera Universitatis Purkynianae Brunensis, Facultas philosophica, 127), p. 147–151: Mycenological Activities in the Countries of the „Eirene“ Committee, and p. 211–252: Appendix II: Mycenaean Bibliography of the „Eirene“ countries, darin: German Democratic Republic, p. 229–230, (online) (PDF); Soviet Union, p. 243–248, (online) (PDF); Yugoslavia, p. 249–252, (online) (PDF). – (review of activities in Mykenology in various countries of the Eastern Bloc with bibliography)
- Grundzüge der altgriechischen mundartlichen Frühgeschichte. Institut für Sprachwissenschaft der Universität Innsbruck, 1991 (Innsbrucker Beiträge zur Sprachwissenschaft: Vorträge und kleinere Schriften, 50).
- The Classics in East Europe. In: Victor Bers, Gregory Nagy (Hrsg.): The Classics in East Europe. Essays on the Survival of a Humanistic Tradition. From the End of World War II to the Present. Worcester, Mass. 1996 (American Philological Association Pamphlet Series), p. 55–84.
- Die ägäischen voralphabetischen Schriften. In: Yoko Nishina (Hrsg.): Europa et Asia Polyglotta – Sprachen und Kulturen. Festschrift für Robert Schmitt-Brandt zum 70. Geburtstag. Röll, Dettelbach 1998, p. 16–21.
- Handbuch des mykenischen Griechisch. Winter, Heidelberg 2003.
- A comparative Graeco-Latin sentence syntax within the European context. Lincom Europa, München 2010 (LINCOM Studies in Indo-European Linguistics, 37), Index
