= American Research Center in Egypt =

US-based research institute

- Established: 1948
- Endowment: $73,233,160
- Address: US Office, 909 North Washington Street, Suite 320 Alexandria, Virginia 22314, USA
- Location: Cairo Office, 2 Midan Simón Bolívar, Garden City, Cairo Governorate 11461, Egypt
- Website: https://www.arce.org/

The American Research Center in Egypt (ARCE) is an American non-profit dedicated to supporting research in Egyptian history. It is a member of the Council of American Overseas Research Centers.

== History ==
ARCE was founded in 1948 in Boston by Edward W. Forbes, then the director of the Fogg Museum at Harvard, and Sterling Dow, then president of the Archaeological Institute of America, with the intention of creating a scholarly research center in Egypt. The center's Egyptian headquarters opened in 1951 in an office at the Office of U.S. Information and Educational Exchange in the American Embassy in Cairo.

ARCE began conservation work at heritage sites throughout Egypt in the early 1990s, following the earthquake in 1992, with support from USAID. USAID endowed ARCE with two sizable endowments, providing the organization with substantial financial support through which it still operates today. Today, ARCE's ongoing grants program is supported by its Antiquities Endowment Fund, which was created with resources from USAID as allocated by the United States Congress.

== Activities ==
ARCE's headquarters are in the Garden City neighborhood of Cairo, with a subsidiary office in Luxor. The United States office is in Alexandria, Virginia. The Cairo Center is host to the Marilyn M. and William Kelly Simpson Library and the Project Archives. It is intended as a base for academics from the United States when conducting research in Egypt.

ARCE awards fellowships to pre-doctoral candidates and postdoctoral scholars for research in Egypt.

Further information on ARCE's programmatic expenditures, grant and contribution income, and executive compensation are available to the public through its annual tax filings.

=== Institutional members ===
Educational and research institutions with field missions in Egypt can pay an annual membership fee to ARCE and in exchange receive logistical support for fieldwork, access to ARCE facilities, event invitations, and more.
