= Comité International Permanent des Études Mycéniennes =

International academic body for Mycenaean Greek studies

The Permanent International Committee for Mycenaean Studies, always known as the Comité International Permanent des Études Mycéniennes or CIPEM, even in English, acts as a standardising body for Mycenaean studies and related disciplines, including Linear A and Cypriot epigraphy. It is an affiliate of UNESCO. It also oversees the organisation of International Colloquia on Mycenaean Studies, which as of 2011 number thirteen. The thirteenth was held in Paris in 2010, and the fourteenth will be held in Copenhagen.

CIPEM was founded in 1956 to propagate the study of texts in Linear B, and was formerly known in English as the International Standing Committee for Mycenaean Studies. It is run by a committee that is headed by a Secretary-General. Professor Marie-Louise Nosch was Secretary-General of the organization from 2010 to 2015.
