= Michael Ventris =

English architect who deciphered Linear B (1922–1956)

Michael Ventris OBE
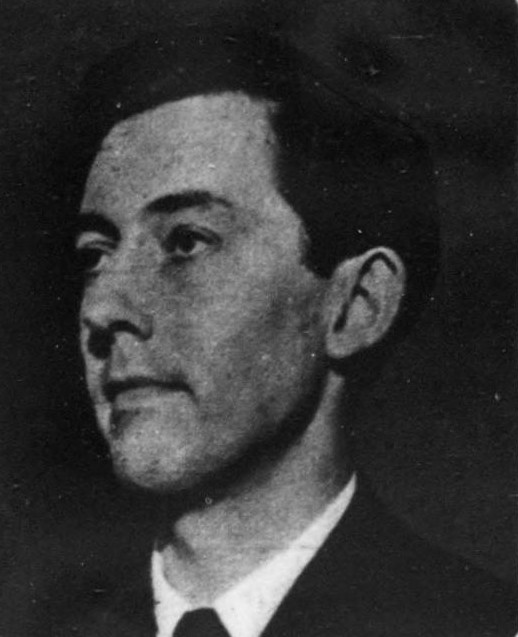
- Born: Michael George Francis Ventris; 12 July 1922; Wheathampstead, Hertfordshire, England
- Died: 6 September 1956 (aged 34); Hatfield, Hertfordshire, England
- Education: Architectural Association School of Architecture
- Occupation: Architect
- Known for: Decipherment of Linear B
- Spouse(s): Lois "Betty" Ventris (née Knox-Niven, 1920–87)
- Children: 2
- Relatives: Francis Ventris (grandfather)
- Awards: Honorary doctorate, University of Uppsala (1954); Kenyon Medal (1959)

Michael George Francis Ventris (/ˈvɛntrɪs/; 12 July 1922 – 6 September 1956) was an English architect, classicist and philologist who deciphered Linear B, the ancient Mycenaean Greek script. A student of languages, Ventris had pursued decipherment as a personal vocation since his adolescence. After creating a new field of study, Ventris died in a car crash a few weeks before the publication of Documents in Mycenaean Greek, written with John Chadwick.

== Early life and education ==
Ventris was born into a traditional army family. His grandfather, Francis Ventris, was a major-general and Commander of British Forces in China. His father, Edward Francis Vereker Ventris, was a lieutenant-colonel in the Indian Army, who retired early due to ill health. Edward Ventris married Anna Dorothea (Dora) Janasz, who was from a wealthy Jewish and Polish paternal background. Michael Ventris was their only child.

The family moved to Switzerland for eight years, seeking a healthy environment for Colonel Ventris. Young Michael started school in Gstaad, where classes were taught in French and German. He soon mastered the Swiss German dialect. A few weeks in Sweden after the Second World War enabled him to become competent in Swedish. His mother often spoke Polish, and he was fluent in it by the age of eight.

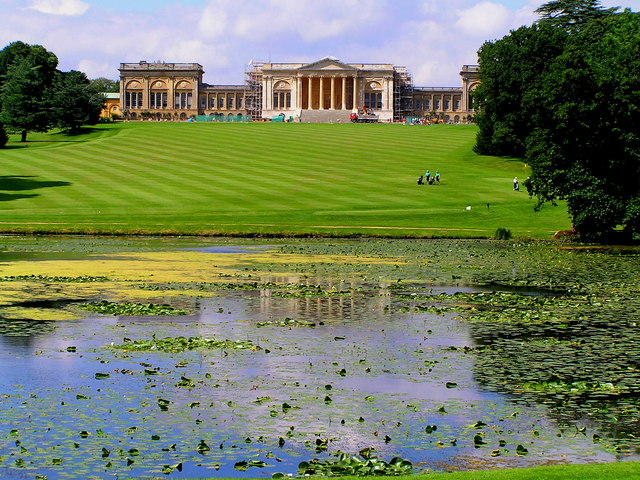
Stowe School in August 2005

In 1931, the Ventris family returned home. From 1931 to 1935, Ventris was sent to Bickley Hall School in Bromley, Kent. His parents divorced in 1935. At this time, he secured a scholarship to Stowe School. At Stowe he learned some Greek and Latin. He did not do outstanding work there – by then he was spending most of his spare time learning as much as he could about Linear B, some of his study time being spent under the covers at night with a torch.

When he was not boarding at school, Ventris lived with his mother, before 1935 in coastal hotels, and then in the avant garde Berthold Lubetkin's Highpoint modernist apartments in Highgate, north London. His mother's acquaintances, who frequented the house, included many sculptors, painters, and writers of the day. The flat was furnished with the works of Marcel Breuer. The money for her artistic patronage came from Polish estates.

== Young adult ==
Ventris's father died in 1938, and his mother, Dora, became administrator of the estate. With the German invasion of Poland in 1939, Dora lost her private income, and in 1940 her father died. Ventris lost his mother to clinical depression and an overdose of barbiturates. He never spoke of her, assuming instead an ebullient and energetic manner in whatever he decided to do, a trait which won him numerous friends.

A friend of the family, Russian sculptor Naum Gabo, took Ventris under his wing. Ventris later said that Gabo was the most family he had ever had. It may have been at Gabo's house that he began the study of Russian.

He decided on architecture as a career, and enrolled in the Architectural Association School of Architecture. There he met his wife-to-be Lois Knox-Niven, known as Betty, daughter of pilot Lois Butler and stepdaughter of Alan Samuel Butler, chairman of the De Havilland Aircraft Company.

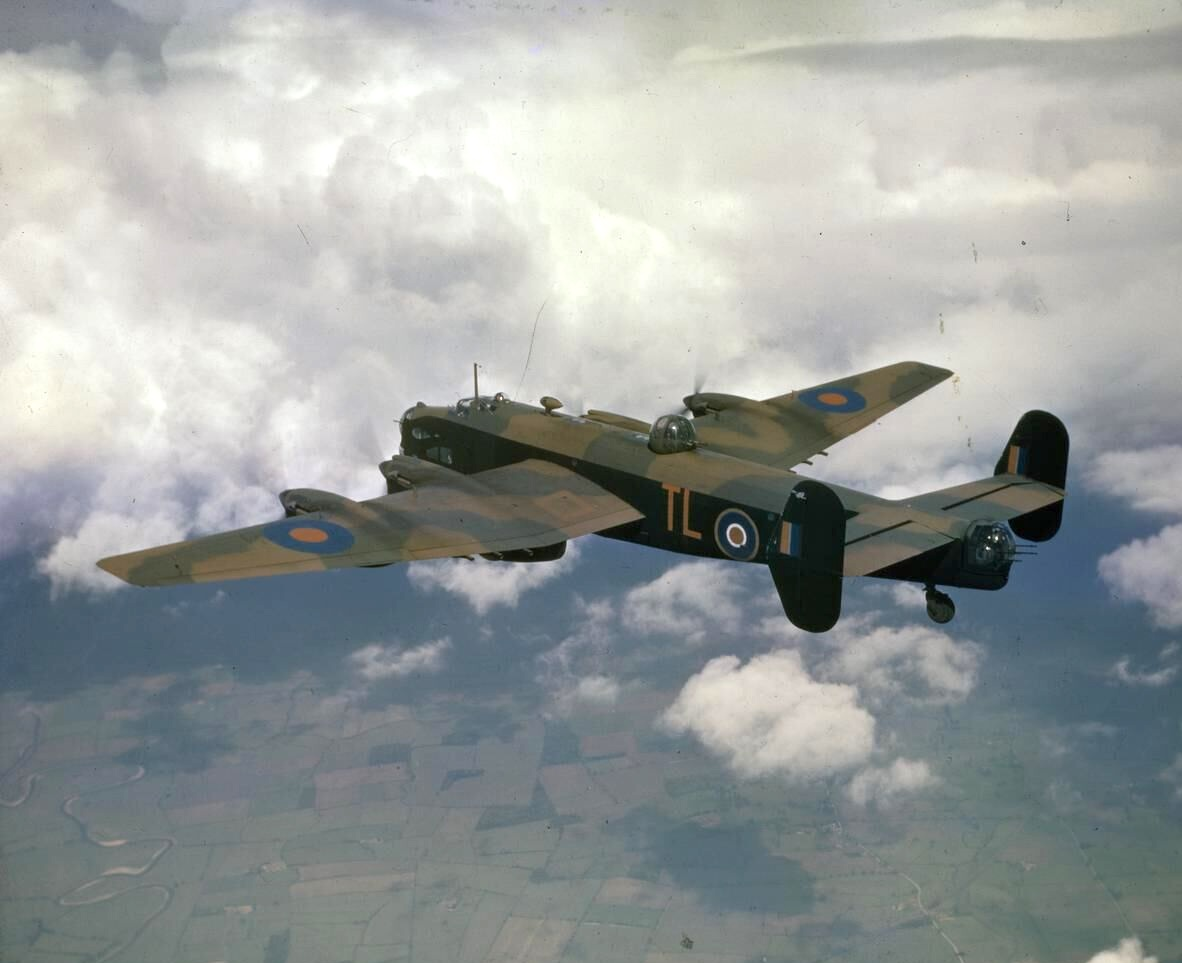
Halifax bomber in flight, 1942

Ventris did not complete his architecture studies, being conscripted in 1942. He chose the Royal Air Force (RAF). His preference was for navigator rather than pilot, and he completed the extensive training in the UK and Canada, to qualify early in 1944 and be commissioned. While training, he studied Russian intensively for several weeks, the purpose of which is not clear. He took part in the bombing of Germany, as aircrew on the Handley Page Halifax with No. 76 Squadron RAF, initially at RAF Breighton and then at RAF Holme-on-Spalding Moor, both in East Yorkshire. After the conclusion of the war, he served out the rest of his term on the ground in Germany, for which he was chosen because of his knowledge of Russian. His duties are unclear. His friends assumed he was on intelligence duties, interpreting his denials as part of a legal gag. No evidence of such assignments has emerged in the decades since. There is also no evidence that he was ever part of any code-breaking unit, as was Chadwick, even though the public has readily believed this explanation of his genius and success with Linear B.

== Architect and palaeographer ==
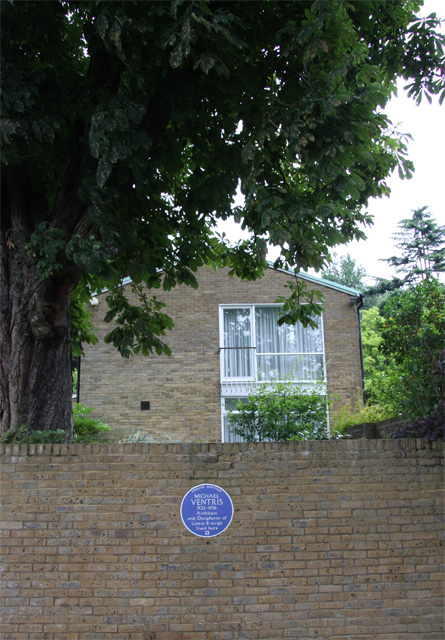
Ventris's home, 1952–1956, which he and his wife, Lois, also an architect, designed

After the war, he worked briefly in Sweden, learning enough Swedish to communicate with scholars. Then he came home to complete his architectural education with honours in 1948 and settled down with Lois working as an architect. He designed schools for the Ministry of Education. He and his wife personally designed their family home, 19 North End, Hampstead. Ventris and his wife had two children: a son, Nikki (1942–1984), and a daughter, Tessa (born 1946).

Ventris continued with his efforts on Linear B, discovering in 1952 that it was an archaic form of Greek.

== Decipherment ==
At the beginning of the 20th century, archaeologist Arthur Evans began excavating an ancient site at Knossos, on the island of Crete. In doing so, he uncovered a great many clay tablets inscribed with two unknown scripts, Linear A and Linear B. Evans attempted to decipher both in the following decades, with little success.

In 1936, Evans hosted an exhibition on Cretan archaeology at Burlington House in London, home of the Royal Academy. It was the jubilee anniversary (50 years) of the British School of Archaeology in Athens, owners and managers of the Knossos site. Evans had given them the site with his Villa Ariadne house some years previously. Boys from Stowe School were in attendance at one lecture and tour conducted by the 85-year-old Evans himself. Ventris, aged 14 at the time, was present and remembered Evans walking with a stick, probably the cane named Prodger, which Evans carried all his life to assist him with his short-sightedness and night blindness. Evans held up tablets of the unknown scripts for the audience to see. During the interview period following the lecture, Ventris spoke up to confirm that Linear B was as yet undeciphered, and he determined to decipher it.

In 1940, the 18-year-old Ventris had an article "Introducing the Minoan Language" published in the American Journal of Archaeology. Ventris's initial hypothesis was that Etruscan and Linear B were related and that this might provide a key to decipherment. Although this proved incorrect, it was a link he continued to explore until the early 1950s.

Shortly after Evans died, Alice Kober noted that certain words in Linear B inscriptions had changing word endings – perhaps declensions in the manner of Greek or Latin. Using this basis, Ventris constructed a series of grids associating the symbols on the tablets with consonants and vowels. While which consonants and vowels these were remained mysterious, Ventris learned enough about the structure of the underlying language to begin experimenting.

Shortly before World War II, American archaeologist Carl Blegen discovered a further 600 or so tablets of Linear B in the Mycenaean palace of Pylos on the Greek mainland. Photographs of these tablets by archaeologist Alison Frantz facilitated Ventris's later decipherment of the Linear B script.

In 1948, Sir John Myres invited a group of academics to help him transcribe Linear B material. Amongst them were Kober and Ventris. Although they did not collaborate further, Kober's work was essential in providing the foundational understanding from which Ventris built his theories on Linear B.

Comparing the Linear B tablets discovered on the Greek mainland and noting that certain symbol groups appeared only in the Cretan texts, Ventris made the inspired guess that those were place names on the island. This proved to be correct. Armed with the symbols he could decipher from this, Ventris soon unlocked much of the text and determined that the underlying language of Linear B, a syllabic script, was in fact Greek. On 1 July 1952, Ventris announced his preliminary findings on a BBC radio talk, which was heard by John Chadwick, a classicist at the University of Cambridge who had been involved in code breaking at Bletchley Park during the Second World War. The two men began to collaborate on further research into deciphering Linear B. In 1953 further Linear B tablets were discovered at ancient Mycenae and ancient Pylos on the Greek mainland, with one of the tablets (PY Ta 641) showing a pictographic tripod cauldron next to Linear B symbols which were translated by Ventris and Chadwick as "ti-ri-po-de", tripod being a Greek word. This led to wider international collaboration with other classical scholars, and between 1953 and 1956 Ventris and Chadwick published joint papers. This overturned Evans's theories of Minoan history by establishing that Cretan civilization, at least in the later periods associated with the Linear B tablets, had been part of Mycenean Greece.

== Death and legacy ==
Ventris was awarded an OBE in 1955 for "services to Mycenaean paleography".

On 6 September 1956, the 34-year-old Ventris, who lived in Hampstead, drove to his in-laws' home late at night to retrieve his wallet. On the way home, he died instantly in a collision in Hatfield, Hertfordshire, after striking a parked lorry in a lay-by on the side of the road. The coroner's verdict was accidental death. In 1959, Ventris was posthumously awarded the British Academy's Kenyon Medal.

Initially, there was some academic skepticism about the decipherment continuing into the 1960s. Today, the Mycenaean Greek attribution is universally accepted by academics.

An English Heritage blue plaque commemorates Ventris at his home in North End, Hampstead and a street in Heraklion, the capital of the Greek island of Crete, was named in his honour.

The Ventris crater on the far side of the Moon was named in his honour by the IAU in 1970.

== Bibliography ==
- Ventris, Michael G. F. (October–December 1940). "Introducing the Minoan Language". American Journal of Archaeology. XLIV/4.
- Ventris, Michael (1950). The languages of the Minoan and Mycenaean civilizations: mid-century report. London: Michael Ventris.
- —— (1951). A preliminary analysis of the language contained in the Mycenaean Archives from Pylos in Messenia.
- ——; Chadwick, John (1953). "Evidence for Greek Dialect in the Mycenaean Archives". The Journal of Hellenic Studies. 73: 84–103. doi:10.2307/628239. JSTOR 628239. S2CID 163873642.
- —— (1954). King Nestor's Four-handled Cups: Greek Inventories in the Minoan Script. Indianapolis: Bobbs-Merrill.
- Ventris, Michael The Journal of Hellenic Studies Volume LXXVI 1956 p. 146 Review of two Russian language works by V. I. Georgiev.
- ——; Chadwick, John (1956). Documents in Mycenaean Greek. Cambridge: Second edition (1974). Cambridge UP. ISBN 0-521-08558-6.
- —— (1956). Mycenaean furniture on the Pylos tablets. Uppsala: Eranos förlag.
- ——; Sacconi, Anna (1988). Work notes on Minoan language research and other unedited papers. Incunabula Graeca, 90. Roma: Edizioni dell'Ateneo.

== See also ==
- Emmett Bennett
