= Alice Kober =

American classical scholar and archaeologist

Alice Elizabeth Kober
- Kober in 1946
- Born: December 23, 1906; New York City, US
- Died: May 16, 1950 (aged 43); Brooklyn, New York City, US
- Education: Hunter College (BA); Columbia University (MA, PhD)
- Scientific career
- Thesis: The Use of Color Terms in the Greek Poets, Including all the Poets from Homer to 146 BC except the Epigrammatists (1932)
- Doctoral advisor: Charles Knapp

Alice Elizabeth Kober (December 23, 1906 – May 16, 1950) was an American classicist best known for her work on the decipherment of Linear B. Educated at Hunter College and Columbia University, Kober taught classics at Brooklyn College from 1930 until her death. In the 1940s, she published three major papers on the script, demonstrating evidence of inflection; her discovery allowed for the deduction of phonetic relationships between different signs without assigning them phonetic values, and was a key step in the eventual decipherment of the script.

== Early life and education ==
Alice Elizabeth Kober was born in New York on December 23, 1906 to the Hungarian Jewish immigrants Franz and Katharina Kober. The family lived in Yorkville, Manhattan, and Franz worked as a furniture upholsterer and later an apartment superintendent. She had one brother, William, two years younger. Kober studied at Hunter College High School, and in 1924 won a $100-per-year scholarship. She went on to attend Hunter College, where she majored in Latin or classics (Note: Her obituary in Language lists her major as classics; Margalit Fox says Latin) and graduated magna cum laude in 1928. It was during her undergraduate studies that Kober was first introduced to the Minoan scripts. (Note: During Kober's lifetime, Linear B was referred to as a Minoan script; only in 1953 did Michael Ventris and John Chadwick reject the designation Minoan in favour of Mycenaean.) After graduating, she began postgraduate study at Columbia University, simultaneously teaching in the Hunter College classics department. She was awarded an MA from Columbia in 1929, and a PhD in 1932. Her PhD dissertation was on The Use of Color Terms in the Greek Poets, Including all the Poets from Homer to 146 BC except the Epigrammatists, supervised by Charles Knapp.

As a graduate student, Kober studied widely, taking classes in mathematics, chemistry, and astronomy as well as classics. After finishing her PhD, she gained experience in archaeology, taking part in fieldwork in Chaco Canyon organised by the University of New Mexico in 1936, and in Greece with the American School of Classical Studies in Athens in 1939. She studied a variety of languages. As well as mastering Greek, Latin, French, German, and Anglo-Saxon, she took courses in Sanskrit at the Linguistic Institute in 1941 and 1942, and at Yale from 1942 to 1945; she also took classes in Hittite, Old Persian, Tocharian, Old Irish, Akkadian, Sumerian, Chinese, and Basque. In late 1946, at the beginning of her Guggenheim Fellowship, she studied several languages of ancient Asia Minor, including Carian, Hattic, Hurrian, Lycian, and Lydian.

Kober never married, and is not known to have had any romantic relationships; aside from her teaching commitments, she dedicated her life to the decipherment of Linear B.

== Career ==
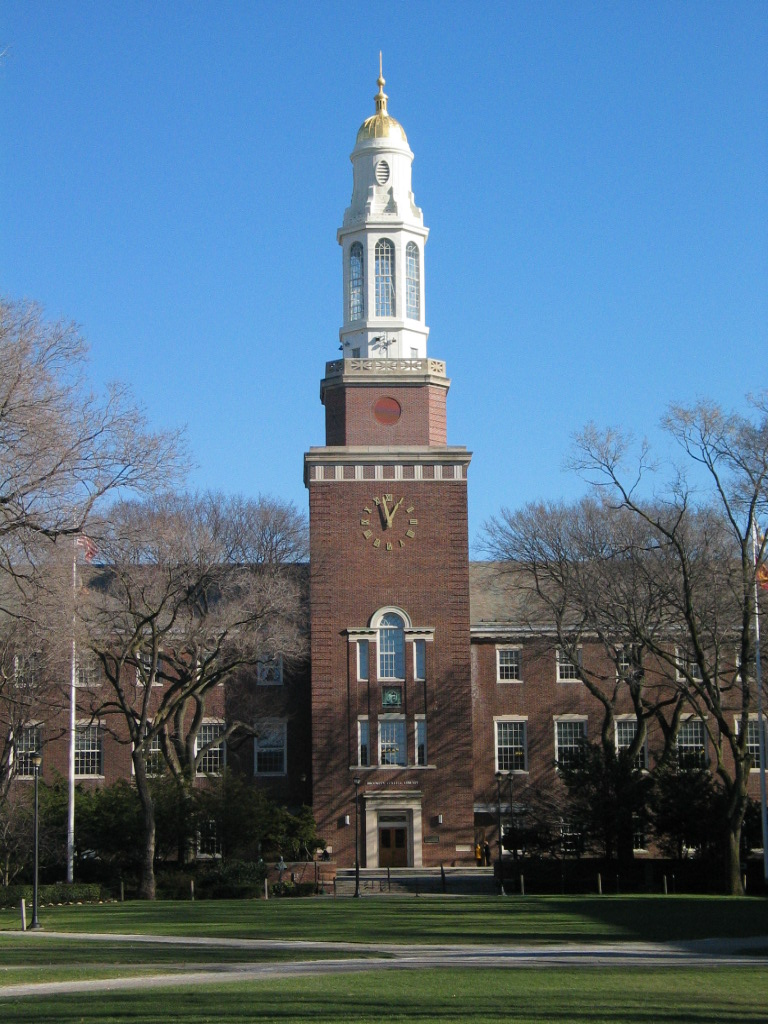
The library at Brooklyn College, where Kober taught from 1930 until her death

From 1930 until her death in 1950, Kober taught at Brooklyn College. In 1936 she became assistant professor there; in 1950 she was promoted to associate professor. Brooklyn College was primarily a teaching rather than a research institution, and she taught a full course load, sharing an office with four others. From 1944, she also converted textbooks and exams into braille for all of Brooklyn College's blind students.

Kober was a member of many professional organisations, including the American Classical League, the Archaeological Institute of America – serving on the editorial board for the American Journal of Archaeology –, the American Philological Association, and the Linguistic Society of America. From the early 1940s, she was the faculty adviser to the Hunter College chapter of Eta Sigma Phi, an honor society for classics. In 1948, she was made a research associate of the University of Pennsylvania's museum.

=== Linear B ===
Kober began work on the script in the early 1930s, though she did not lecture about or publish her work on it until the 1940s. Unlike other scholars at the time, who began their analysis of the script by attempting to identify the language that it encoded, Kober believed that any decipherment of Linear B must begin with the internal evidence of the Linear B tablets. She began her work on Linear B by analysing the individual characters on the tablets, compiling statistics about their frequency, the positions they appeared in, and the characters which they appeared alongside. Over the course of her work on the script, she filled 40 notebooks and – after the beginning of the Second World War made paper harder to come by – 180,000 index cards made from scrap paper with her research notes.

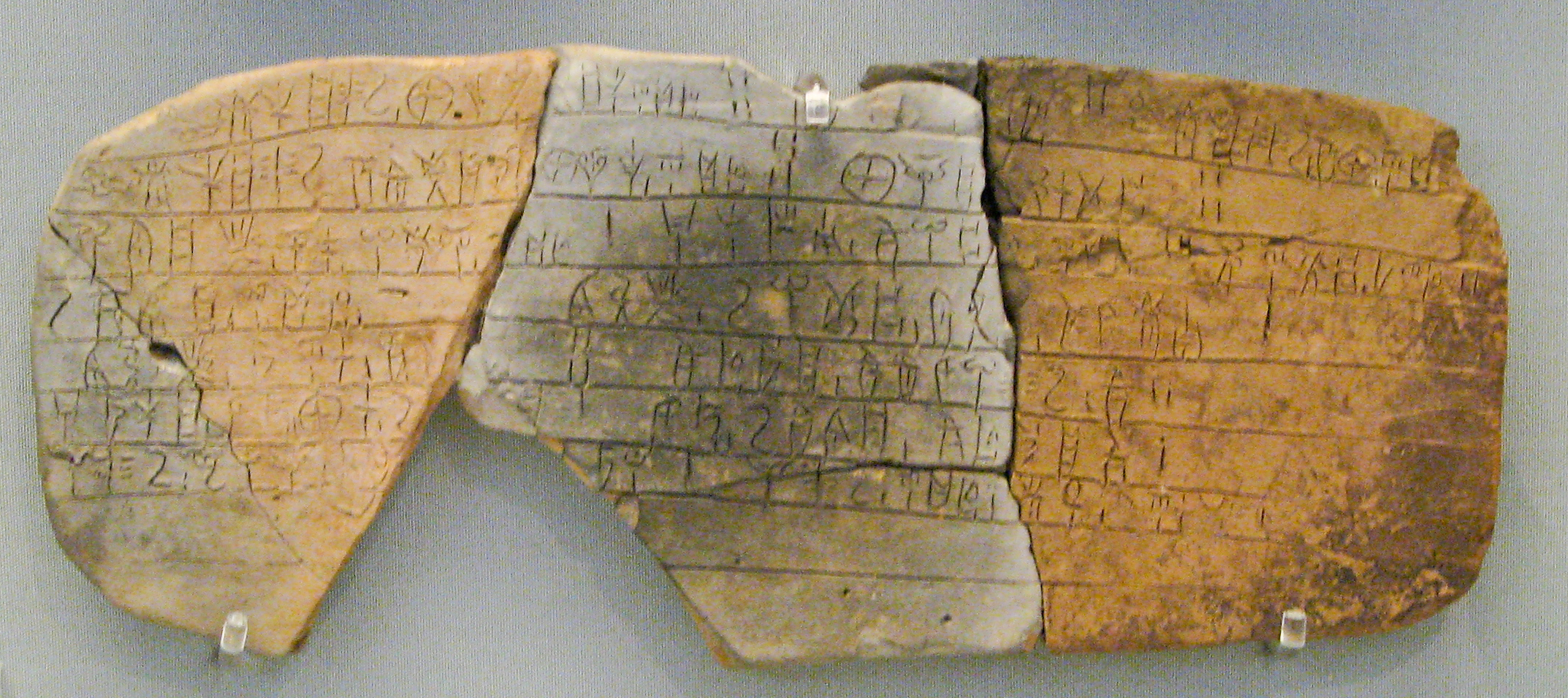
Linear B tablet found at Pylos. Kober dedicated her life to the decipherment of the script.

In 1945, Kober published the first of three major papers on Linear B, "Evidence of Inflection in the 'Chariot' Tablets from Knossos", proving the hypothesis, first suggested by Sir Arthur Evans, that it recorded an inflected language. In 1946 she published the second of her major papers on the script, "Inflection in Linear Class B", (Note: Though the publication date of the paper was 1946, it was not printed until 1947.) which expanded on the work in her 1945 paper. This paper, according to Maurice Pope her "most rigorous and most famous" work, would prove to be a crucial step in the eventual decipherment of Linear B. In it, Kober identified so-called bridging syllables, where the beginning of the syllable is part of the root of a word, and the end is part of the inflected suffix; this allowed for the identification of phonetic relationships between sets of Linear B signs.

Also in 1946, Kober was awarded a Guggenheim Fellowship, allowing her to take a year off from her teaching duties to work on Linear B full time. She traveled to England, spending five weeks at St. Hugh's College, Oxford, where she would have access to the entire collection of unpublished Linear B inscriptions discovered by Evans. Kober spent her time in Oxford copying these inscriptions by hand, so they could be analysed on her return to New York; where she had only previously had access to the approximately 200 already-published inscriptions, after her time at St. Hugh's she had copies of nearly 1800.

In September 1947, at the instigation of John Franklin Daniel, the editor of the American Journal of Archaeology, Kober began work on her third major paper on Linear B, summarizing the state of scholarship on the Minoan scripts; she submitted the finished manuscript in October 1947, and it was published in 1948. Building on her 1945 and 1946 papers, in this article Kober set forth a grid of ten Linear B characters, showing for each which other signs it shared a consonant or vowel with. In the late 1940s, she also began proofreading and typing up John Myres' manuscript of Scripta Minoa II. She returned to Oxford in 1948 to work with Myres on the preparation of the manuscript for publication, and agreed to assist with Scripta Minoa III, which was to cover Linear A.

== Death and legacy ==
In July 1949, Kober fell ill and was hospitalised. She died on May 16, 1950, aged 43. There is no record of the cause of her illness in her correspondence, death certificate, or obituaries. According to her cousin, family rumor held that she died of stomach cancer. Kober left her archives to Emmett L. Bennett Jr., an American classicist with whom she had corresponded since 1948. They are held by the University of Texas at Austin.

Kober is remembered as an important contributor to the decipherment of Linear B. In an obituary in the journal Language, Adelaide Hahn wrote that "if and when this decipherment is ultimately achieved, surely her careful and faithful spade-work will be found to have played a part therein". This prediction would prove true: after Michael Ventris' decipherment of the script, his collaborator John Chadwick recognised her for laying the foundation, and described her contributions to the study of Linear B as "the most valuable" before Ventris' final solution.

== Select bibliography ==
- Kober, Alice (1932). The Use of Color Terms in the Greek Poets, Including all the Poets from Homer to 146 BC except the Epigrammatists (Thesis). New York City: Columbia University.
- Kober, Alice (1945). "Evidence of Inflection in the 'Chariot' Tablets from Knossos". American Journal of Archaeology. 49 (2): 143–151. doi:10.2307/499698. JSTOR 499698. S2CID 245266039.
- Kober, Alice (1946). "Inflection in Linear Class B: I – Declension". American Journal of Archaeology. 50 (2): 268–276. doi:10.2307/499054. JSTOR 499054. S2CID 192544434.
- Kober, Alice (1948). "The Minoan Scripts: Fact and Theory". American Journal of Archaeology. 52 (1): 82–103. doi:10.2307/500554. JSTOR 500554. S2CID 193101644.

== See also ==
- The Riddle of the Labyrinth, a book by Margalit Fox about Kober's analyses of Linear B

== Works cited ==
- Chadwick, John (1967). The Decipherment of Linear B (2nd ed.). Cambridge: Cambridge University Press. doi:10.1017/CBO9781107589032.
- Dow, Stirling (1954). "Necrology: Alice Elizabeth Kober". American Journal of Archaeology. 58 (2). JSTOR 500113.
- Fox, Margalit (2013). Riddle of the Labyrinth. London: Profile Books. ISBN 9781781251324.
- Gallafent, Alex (6 June 2013). "Alice Kober: Unsung heroine who helped decode Linear B". BBC.
- Hahn, Adelaide (1950). "Alice E. Kober". Notes. Language. 26 (3): 442–443. JSTOR 409749.
- "Miscelánea". Minos (in Spanish). 1: 138–139. 1951.
- "PASP Archives and Finding Aids". University of Texas.
- Pope, Maurice (1975). The Story of Decipherment: From Egyptian Hieroglyphics to Linear B. London: Thames and Hudson.
- Voight, Laura A. "Professor Alice Kober" (PDF). Brown University.
