= Iklaina =

Iklaina Ίκλαινα
- Community
- Location within Greece
- Coordinates: 36°59.7′N 21°43.4′E
- Country: Greece
- Administrative region: Peloponnese
- Regional unit: Messenia
- Municipality: Pylos-Nestoras
- Municipal unit: Pylos
- Elevation: 190 m (620 ft)

Population (2021)
  - Community: 285
- Time zone: UTC+2 (EET)
  - Summer (DST): UTC+3 (EEST)
- Postal code: 240 01
- Area code: 27230
- Vehicle registration: KM

Iklaina (Greek: Ίκλαινα) is a historic village in the municipal unit of Pylos, Messenia, Greece. The settlement, which is situated in low hills approximately 10 km (6.2 mi) northeast of Pylos, stands upon the remains of a Late Bronze Age (ca. 1600-1100 BC) city. An archaeological site has been surveyed and excavated there by the Athens Archaeological Society and the University of Missouri–St. Louis under the direction of Michael Cosmopoulos. Finds include an early Mycenaean palace, giant terrace walls, murals, an advanced drainage system, and a clay tablet dating from between 1450 and 1350 B.C. that features an early example of writing known as Linear B script. Other cultural periods represented are the Late Classical and Byzantine periods.

== Archaeological research ==
The systematic excavation of the ancient settlement at Iklaina started in 2006, following a survey of the site that had taken place during the five years prior to the excavation. The archaeologists located residential buildings dating to the end of the Mycenaean Greek period to the beginning of the Late Hellenistic period.

The discovery of a large terrace, 23 x 8 m, built in the Cyclopean building method using massive blocks of stone, proved to be particularly important. The “Cyclopean Terrace”, as it is called, supported a large building, of the megaron type. The building may have had two or three stories and is identified as the Cyclopean Terrace Complex. Although this building had been partly destroyed, the excavations revealed some of its surviving parts and defined its architectural form: it was a building complex consisting of three wings, built around a rectangular central court. The movable finds prove that the last phase of that building was the LH IIIA2 period, i.e. about 1330 B.C.

During the 2009 phase of the excavation, more than 2500 fragments of wall-paintings came to light. One fragment depicts a ship with three human figures and dolphins, as well as a procession of women.

This building complex on the Cyclopean Terrace was completely destroyed in LH IIIA2 period and was never rebuilt. Later building activity was carried out in the northern part of the settlement, however, where the so-called "Megaron Γ" was constructed. This appears to have at least three rooms and a porch. A hearth and storage rooms were found. In the buildings of the southern side, parts of a particularly elaborate sewer system also were discovered.

The most important discovery, however, took place in a dump next to the central sewer that contained burnt shards. A fragment of a Linear B tablet was discovered there that bore writing on both sides. This tablet dates to the LHIIB-IIIA1 period, i.e. around 1450-1400 B.C., which makes it the earliest Mycenaean tablet that has been found to date on the mainland of Greece.

Furthermore, during the excavation period of 2012, an open-air sanctuary was discovered, also unique for that period, and for mainland Greece in general. Another important find of the same excavation period was a large rectangular building (Building X), in front of which passed a paved street, of an exceptionally elaborate construction, possibly a processional street, which led the way from the houses of the settlement to the complex of the Cyclopean Terrace.

The available evidence indicates that Iklaina was a powerful Mycenaean centre in the LH IIB/ IIIA1 period. The large building complexes, the rich finds, the refined taste, and the advanced level of technical knowledge of the inhabitants suggests that Iklaina could have been the capital of an autonomous small state that may have clashed with a neighboring state at Ano Englianos, which may have subdued the former and demoted it to a secondary capital of one of the provinces of Pylia.

A final destruction of the ancient city seems to have occurred about 1200 B.C.

== Village population ==
Year	Population
1981	352
1991	342
2001	361
2011	313
2021	285
