= Linear B =

Syllabic script used for writing Mycenaean Greek

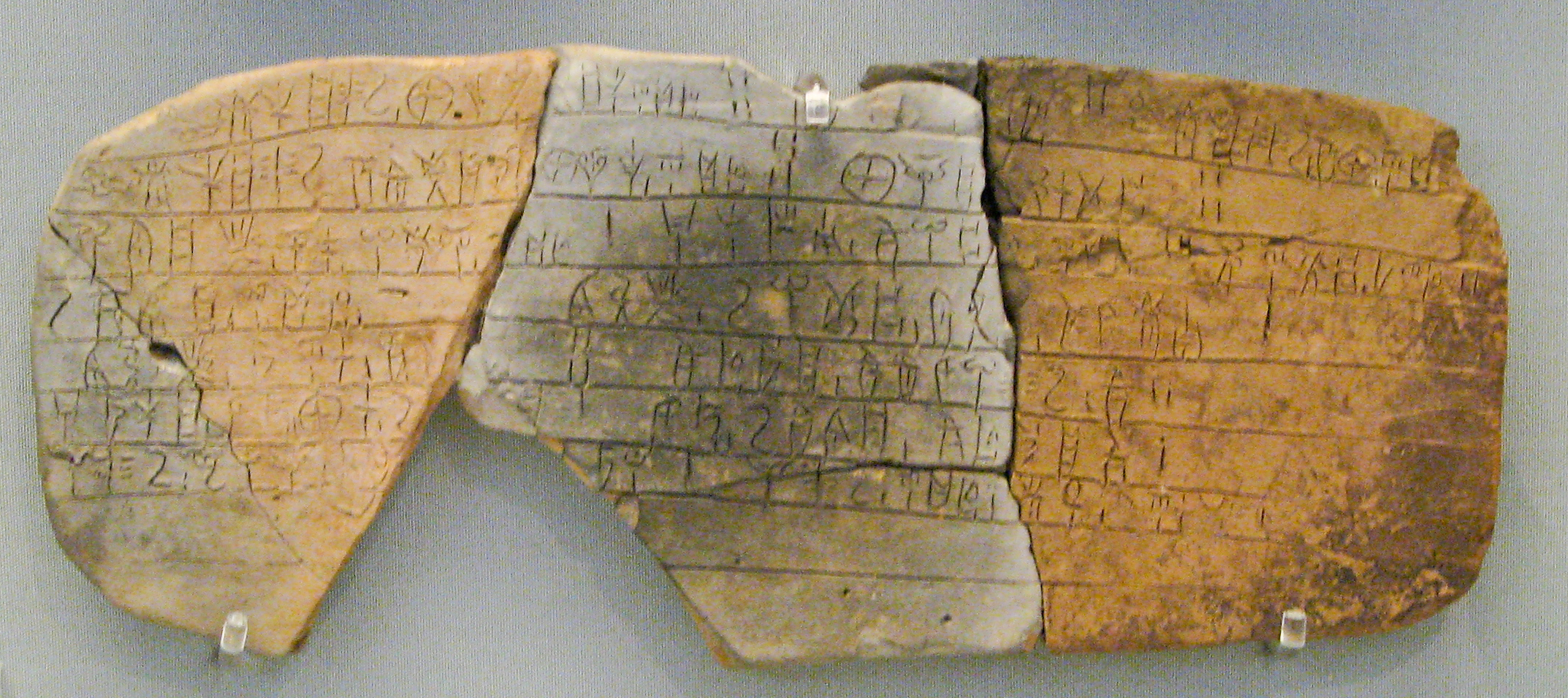
- Script type: Syllabary with additional ideograms
- Period: c. 1450–1200 BC
- Status: Extinct
- Direction: Left-to-right
- Languages: Mycenaean Greek

Related scripts
- Parent systems: Linear A: Linear B
- Sister systems: Cypro-Minoan syllabary

ISO 15924
- ISO 15924: Linb (401), Linear B

Unicode
- Unicode alias: Linear B
- Unicode range: U+10000–U+1007F (syllabary); U+10080–U+100FF (ideograms)

External videos
- How to make a Linear B tablet (Anna Judson) - YouTube

Linear B is a syllabic script that was used for writing in Mycenaean Greek, the earliest attested form of the Greek language. The script predates the Greek alphabet by several centuries, the earliest known examples dating to around 1450 BC. It is adapted from the earlier Linear A, an undeciphered script, perhaps used for writing the Minoan language, as is the later Cypriot syllabary, which also recorded Greek. Linear B, found mainly in the palace archives at Knossos, Kydonia, Pylos, Thebes and Mycenae, disappeared with the fall of the Mycenaean civilization during the Late Bronze Age collapse. The succeeding period, known as the Greek Dark Ages, provides no conclusive evidence of the use of writing.

Linear B was deciphered in 1952 by English architect and self-taught linguist Michael Ventris based on the research of the American classicist Alice Kober. It is the only Bronze Age Aegean script to have been deciphered, with Linear A, Cypro-Minoan, and Cretan hieroglyphic remaining unreadable.

Linear B consists of around 87 syllabic signs and over 100 ideographic signs. These ideograms or "signifying" signs symbolize objects or commodities. They have no phonetic value and are never used as word signs in writing a sentence.

The application of Linear B texts appear to have been mostly confined to administrative contexts, mainly at Mycenaean palatial sites. In the handwriting of all the thousands of clay tablets, a relatively small number of scribes have been detected: 45 in Pylos (west coast of the Peloponnese, in Southern Greece) and 66 in Knossos (Crete). The use of Linear B signs on trade objects like amphora was more widespread. Once the palaces were destroyed, the script disappeared.

== Script ==
Linear B has roughly 200 signs, divided into syllabic signs with phonetic values and ideograms with semantic values. The representations and naming of these signs have been standardized by a series of international colloquia starting in Paris in 1956. After the third meeting in 1961 at the Wingspread Conference Center in Racine, Wisconsin, a standard proposed primarily by Emmett L. Bennett Jr. became known as the Wingspread Convention, which was adopted by a new organization, the Comité International Permanent des Études Mycéniennes (CIPEM: Permanent International Committee of Mycenaean Studies), affiliated in 1970 by the fifth colloquium with UNESCO. Colloquia continue: the 13th occurred in 2010 in Paris.

Many of the signs are identical or similar to those in Linear A; however, Linear A encodes an as yet unknown language, and it is uncertain whether similar signs had the same phonetic values.

=== Syllabic signs ===
The grid developed during decipherment by Michael Ventris and John Chadwick of phonetic values for syllabic signs is shown below. (Note that "q" represents the labialized velar stops [ɡʷ, kʷ, kʷʰ], not the uvular stop of the IPA, whereas "j" does represent the IPA voiced palatal approximant [j], represented by the letter "y" in English words such as "yes" and "yoke".)

Initial consonants are in the leftmost column; vowels are in the top row beneath the title. The transcription of the syllable, which may not have been pronounced that way, is listed next to the sign along with Bennett's identifying number for the sign preceded by an asterisk (as was Ventris's and Chadwick's convention). (Note: In the Unicode character names, Bennett's number has been rendered into a three-digit code by padding with initial zeros and preceding with a B (for "Linear B").) If the transcription of the sign remains uncertain, Bennett's number serves to identify the sign. The signs on the tablets and sealings often show considerable variation from each other and from the representations below. Discovery of the reasons for the variation and possible semantic differences is a topic of ongoing debate in Mycenaean studies.

Recognised signs of shape V, CV (Note: In linguistics C and V in this type of context stand for consonant and vowel.)
	-a		-e		-i		-o		-u	
	𐀀	a *08	𐀁	e *38	𐀂	i *28	𐀃	o *61	𐀄	u *10
d-	𐀅	da *01	𐀆	de *45	𐀇	di *07	𐀈	do *14	𐀉	du *51
j-	𐀊	ja *57	𐀋	je *46			𐀍	jo *36		
k-	𐀏	ka *77	𐀐	ke *44	𐀑	ki *67	𐀒	ko *70	𐀓	ku *81
m-	𐀔	ma *80	𐀕	me *13	𐀖	mi *73	𐀗	mo *15	𐀘	mu *23
n-	𐀙	na *06	𐀚	ne *24	𐀛	ni *30	𐀜	no *52	𐀝	nu *55
p-	𐀞	pa *03	𐀟	pe *72	𐀠	pi *39	𐀡	po *11	𐀢	pu *50
q-	𐀣	qa *16	𐀤	qe *78	𐀥	qi *21	𐀦	qo *32		
r-	𐀨	ra *60	𐀩	re *27	𐀪	ri *53	𐀫	ro *02	𐀬	ru *26
s-	𐀭	sa *31	𐀮	se *09	𐀯	si *41	𐀰	so *12	𐀱	su *58
t-	𐀲	ta *59	𐀳	te *04	𐀴	ti *37	𐀵	to *05	𐀶	tu *69
w-	𐀷	wa *54	𐀸	we *75	𐀹	wi *40	𐀺	wo *42		
z-	𐀼	za *17	𐀽	ze *74			𐀿	zo *20		

=== Special and unknown signs ===
In addition to the grid, the first edition of Documents in Mycenaean Greek contained a number of other signs termed "homophones" because they appeared at that time to resemble the sounds of other syllables and were transcribed accordingly: pa_{2} and pa_{3} were presumed homophonous to pa. Many of these were identified by the second edition and are shown in the "special values" below. The second edition relates: "It may be taken as axiomatic that there are no true homophones." The unconfirmed identifications of *34 and *35 as ai_{2} and ai_{3} were removed. pa_{2} became qa.

Special values
Character	𐁀	𐁁	𐁂	𐁃	𐁄	𐁅	𐁇	𐁆	𐁈	𐁉	𐁊	𐁋	𐁌	𐁍
Transcription	a_{2} (ha)	a_{3} (ai)	au	dwe	dwo	nwa	pte	pu_{2} (phu)	ra_{2} (rya)	ra_{3} (rai)	ro_{2} (ryo)	ta_{2} (tya)	twe	two
Bennett's number	*25	*43	*85	*71	*90	*48	*62	*29	*76	*33	*68	*66	*87	*91

Other values remain unknown, mainly because of scarcity of evidence concerning them. (Note: Sign *89 is not listed in Ventris & Chadwick's (1973) tables, but it does appear in the appendix of Bennett (1964) as part of the Wingspread convention.) Note that *34 and *35 are mirror images of each other, but whether this graphic relationship indicates a phonetic one remains unconfirmed.

Untranscribed and doubtful values
Character	𐁐	𐁑	𐁒	𐁓		𐁔	𐁕	𐁖	𐁗	𐁘	𐀎	𐁙	𐁚	𐁛	𐁜	𐁝
Transcription	*18	*19	*22	*34	*35	*47	*49	pa_{3}?	*63	swi?	ju?	zu?	swa?	*83	*86	*89
Bennett's number	*18	*19	*22	*34	*35	*47	*49	*56	*63	*64	*65	*79	*82	*83	*86	*89

CIPEM inherited the former authority of Bennett and the Wingspread convention in deciding what signs are "confirmed" and how to officially represent the various sign categories. In editions of Mycenaean texts, the signs whose values have not been confirmed by CIPEM are always transcribed as numbers preceded by an asterisk (e.g., *64). CIPEM also allocates the numerical identifiers, and until such allocation, new signs (or obscured or mutilated signs) are transcribed as a bullet-point enclosed in square brackets: [•].

=== Spelling and pronunciation ===
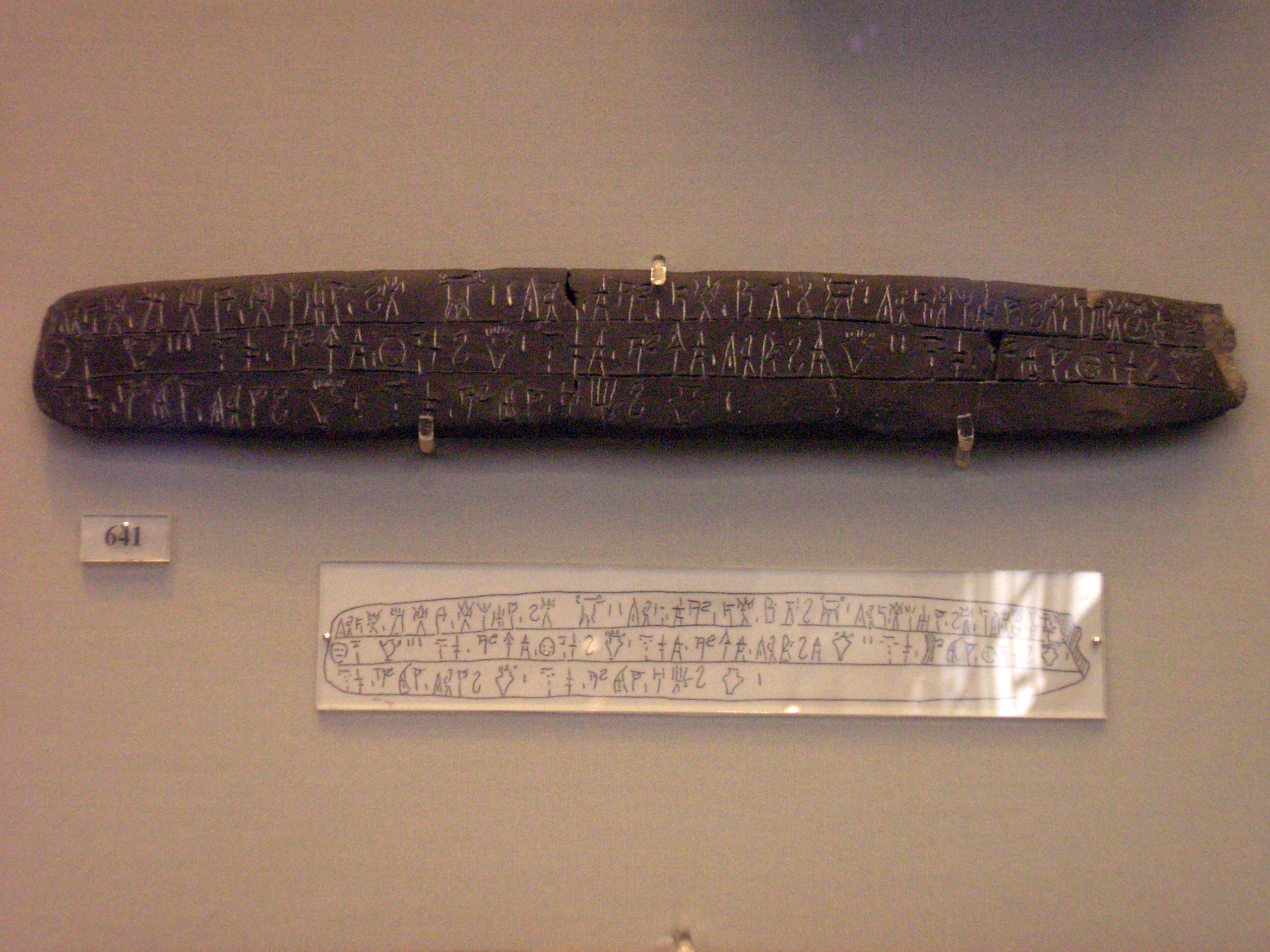
The Tripod tablet, discovered by Carl Blegen at the Palace of Nestor, Pylos, in 1952

The signs are approximations, since each may be used to represent a variety of about 70 distinct combinations of sounds within rules and conventions. The grid presents a system of monosyllabic signs of the type V/CV. Clarification of the 14 or so special values tested the limits of the grid model, but Chadwick eventually concluded that even with the ramifications, the syllabic signs can unexceptionally be considered monosyllabic.

Possible exceptions, Chadwick goes on to explain, include the two diphthongs, 𐁀 (ai) and 𐁁 (au), as in 𐁀𐀓𐀠𐀴𐀍, ai-ku-pi-ti-jo, for Aiguptios (Αἰγύπτιος, "Egyptian") and 𐁁𐀐𐀷, au-ke-wa, for Augewās (Αὐγείας "Augeas"). (Note: Ventris and Chadwick use Roman characters for the reconstructed Mycenaean Greek and give the closest later literary word in Greek characters. Often the phonetics are the same, but equally as often the reconstructed words represent an earlier form. Here the classical Greek was formed by dropping the w and lengthening the e to ei.) However, a diphthong is by definition two vowels united into a single sound and therefore might be typed as just V. Thus 𐁉 (rai), as in 𐀁𐁉𐀺, e-rai-wo, for elaiwon (ἔλαιον), (Note: The w is dropped to form the classical Greek.) is of the type CV. Diphthongs are otherwise treated as two monosyllables: 𐀀𐀫𐀄𐀨, a-ro-u-ra, for arourans (accusative plural of ἄρουραι, "tamarisk trees"), of the types CV and V. Lengths of vowels and accents are not marked.

𐁌 (Twe), 𐁍 (two), 𐁃 (dwe), 𐁄 (dwo), 𐁅 (nwa) and the more doubtful 𐁘 (swi) and 𐁙 (swa) may be regarded as beginning with labialized consonants, rather than two consonants, even though they may alternate with a two-sign form: o-da-twe-ta and o-da-tu-we-ta for Odatwenta; a-si-wi-jo and a-swi-jo for Aswios (Ἄσιος). Similarly, 𐁈 (rya), 𐁊 (ryo) and 𐁋 (tya) begin with palatalized consonants rather than two consonants: -ti-ri-ja for -trja (-τρια).

The one sign Chadwick tags as the exception to the monosyllabic rule is 𐁇 (pte), but this he attributes to a development pte<*pje as in kleptei<*klep-jei.

Linear B does not consistently distinguish between voiced and unvoiced stop consonants or between aspirated and unaspirated stops, even though these distinctions are phonemic in Mycenaean Greek. (The exception is the dental series, where syllables starting with the voiced dental stop are written differently from syllables starting with the voiceless unaspirated or voiceless aspirated dental stop.) For example, pa-te is patēr (πατήρ), pa-si is phāsi (φησί), (Note: Classical words typically have the η of the Attic-Ionic dialect where Linear B represents the original α.) ko-ru is korus (κόρυς, "helmet"), ka-ra-we is grāwes (plural of γρηύς), ko-no is skhoinos ("rope"), to-so is tosos (τόσος or τόσσος), to-ra-ke is thōrākes (plural of θώραξ, "breastplate"). The exceptional d-series for voiced dentals is illustrated by do-ra for dōra (plural of δῶρον, "gift").

In some cases aspiration may be marked, but this is optional: pu-te for phutēr ("planter", from φυτεύω), but phu-te-re for phutēres ("planters"). Initial /h/ may be marked only when followed by a, and only rarely: ha-te-ro for hateron (masculine ἅτερος), and yet a-ni-ja for hāniai (ἁνίαι).

The q-series is used for syllables beginning with labialized velar consonants (see under Mycenaean Greek), a class of consonants that disappeared from classical Greek by regular phonetic change (becoming in various circumstances β, π, φ, or δ, τ, θ). These consonants had various sources: inheritance from Proto-Indo-European, assimilation, borrowing of foreign words, especially names. In Mycenaean they are /kʷ/, /gʷ/, and rarely /kʷh/ in names and a few words: a-pi-qo-ro for amphiq^{u}oloi (ἀμφίπολοι); qo-u-ko-ro for g^{u}oukoloi (βουκόλοι, "cowherders"); qa-si-re-u for g^{u}asileus (βασιλεύς, "basileus", meaning in this period "court official or local chieftain"), -qo-i-ta for -φόντης.

The j-series represents the semivowel equivalent to English "y", and is used word-initially and as an intervocalic glide after a syllable ending in i: -a-jo for -αῖος (-aios); a-te-mi-ti-jo for Ἀρτεμίτιος (Artemitios). The w-series similarly are semivowels used word-initially and intervocalically after a syllable ending in u: ku-wa-no for kuanos (κύανος, "blue").

The r-series includes both the /r/ and /l/ phonemes: ti-ri-po for tripos (τρίπος, i.e. τρίπους) and tu-ri-so for Tulisos (Τυλισός).

Some consonants in some contexts are not written (but are understood to be present), such as word-initial s- and -w before a consonant, as in pe-ma for sperma (σπέρμα, "seed"). The pe-, which was primarily used as its value pe of grid class CV, is here being used for sper-. This was not an innovative or exceptional use, but followed the stated rules. Syllable-final -l, -m, -n, -r and -s are also not written out, and only word-final velars are notated by plene writing: a-to-ro-qo for anthrōq^{u}os (ἄνθρωπος, "human being, person"). Here a, being primarily of grid class V, is being used as an- and could be used for al, am, ar, and so on.

In the case of clusters of two or three consonants that do not follow the initial s- and -w rule or the double consonants: ξ (ks or x), ψ (ps) and q^{u}s (which later did not exist in classical Greek), each consonant in the cluster is represented by a type CV sign that shares its consonant value: ko-no-so for Knōsos, (Note: Double letters, as in Knossos, were never represented; one was dropped.) or ku-ru-so for khrusos (χρυσός, "gold"). The vowels of these signs have been called "empty", "null", "extra", "dead", "dummy" and other terms by various writers as they represent no sound. There were rules though, that governed the selection of the "empty" vowel and therefore determined which sign was to be used. The vowel had to be the same as that of the first syllable following the cluster or, if at the end of the word, preceding: ti-ri-po with ti- (instead of ta-, te- and so on) to match -ri-. A rare exception occurs in words formed from wa-na-ka, wanax (ϝάναξ, Homeric and Classical ἄναξ): wa-na-ka-te for wanaktei (dative), and wa-na-ka-te-ro for wanakteros, the adjectival form. This exception may not have applied to all contexts, as an example of wa-na-ka that follows standard rules has emerged in Agios Vasileios in Laconia. The text reads wa-na-ko-to (genitive) and is written on a sealing nodule dating to the late 14th or early 13th century, slightly earlier than other Linear B texts found on mainland Greece.

=== Ideograms ===
Linear B also uses a large number of ideograms. They express:

- the type of object concerned (e.g. a cow, wool, a spear),
- a unit of measure.

They have no phonetic value and are never used as word signs in writing a sentence, unlike Han characters or cuneiform. Ideograms are typically at the end of a line before a number and appear to signify to which object the number applies. Many of the values remain unknown or disputed. Some commodities such as cloth and containers are divided into many different categories represented by distinct ideograms. Livestock may be marked with respect to sex.

The numerical references for the ideograms were originally devised by Ventris and Bennett and divided into functional groups corresponding to the breakdown of Bennett's index. The groups are numbered beginning 100, 110, 120 etc., with some provision of spare numbers for future additions; the official CIPEM numberings used today are based on Ventris and Bennett's numbering, with the provision that three or four letter codes (written in small capitals), based on Latin words that seemed relevant at the time, are used where the meanings are known and agreed. Unicode (as of version 5.0) encodes 123 Linear B ideograms.

The ideograms are symbols, not pictures of the objects in question; for example, one tablet records a tripod with missing legs, but the ideogram used is of a tripod with three legs. In modern transcriptions of Linear B tablets, it is typically convenient to represent an ideogram by its Latin or English name or by an abbreviation of the Latin name. Ventris and Chadwick generally used English; Bennett, Latin. Neither the English nor the Latin can be relied upon as an accurate name of the object; in fact, the identification of some of the more obscure objects is a matter of exegesis.

Ideograms
Glyph	Code point (Note: Note that the codes do not represent all glyphs, only the major ones.)	Bennett	CIPEM	English
People and animals
𐂀	U+10080	100 A-	VIR vir	MAN
𐂁	U+10081	102 A-	MUL mulier	WOMAN
𐂂	U+10082	104 Cn	CERV cervus	DEER
𐂃	U+10083	105 Ca S-	EQU equus	HORSE
𐂄	U+10084	105 Ca	EQU^{f}	mare
𐂅	U+10085	105 Ca	EQU^{m}	stallion
𐀥	U+10025	106; QI; *21	OVIS ovis	SHEEP
𐀸		WE; *75	we-ka-ta Bous ergatēs	"Adjunct to ox" (1973)
𐂆	U+10086	106^{b} C- D-	OVIS^{f}	EWE
𐂇	U+10087	106^{a} C- D-	OVIS^{m}	RAM
𐁒	U+10052	107; RA; *22	CAP capra	GOAT
𐂈	U+10088	107^{b} C- Mc	CAP^{f}	DOE (GOAT)
𐂉	U+10089	107^{a} C-	CAP^{m}	BUCK (GOAT)
𐁂	U+10042	108; AU; *85 C-	SUS sūs	PIG
𐂊	U+1008A	108^{b} C-	SUS^{f}	SOW
𐂋	U+1008B	108^{a} C-	SUS^{m}	BOAR
𐀘	U+10018	109; MU; *23 C-	BOS bōs	OX
𐂌	U+1008C	109^{b} C-	BOS^{f}	COW
𐂍	U+1008D	109^{a} C-	BOS^{m}	OX/BULL
Units of measurement
𐄿	U+1013F	110	Z kotylai	Volume; Cup
𐄾	U+1013E	111	V khoinikes	Volume
𐄼	U+1013C	112	T	Dry
𐄽	U+1013D	113	S	Liquid
𐄻	U+1013B	114		Weight
		*21		Weight
		*2		Weight
𐄺	U+1013A	115	P	Weight
𐄹	U+10139	116	N	Weight
𐄸	U+10138	117	M dimnaion	Weight
𐄷	U+10137	118	L talanton	TALENT
		*72 G-		Bunch?
		*74 S-		Pair
		*15 S-		Single
		*61		Deficit
By dry measure
𐂎	U+1008E	120 E- F-	GRA grānum	WHEAT
𐂏	U+1008F	121 F-	HORD hordeum	BARLEY
𐂐	U+10090	122 F- U-	OLIV olīva	OLIVES
𐀛	U+1001B	NI; *30 F	FICUS	FIGS
𐀎	U+1000E	*65	FARINA	FLOUR "some kind of grain"
𐂑	U+10091	123 G- Un	AROM arōma	CONDIMENT / SPICE
		KO; *70 G-		Coriander
𐀭	U+1002D	SA; *31 G-		Sesame
		KU; *81 G-		Cumin
		SE; *9 G-		Celery
		MA; *80 G-		Fennel
		124 G-	PYC	cyperus
𐂒	U+10092	125 F-	CYP	cyperus?
		126 F-	CYP+KU	cyperus+ku
𐂓	U+10093	127 Un	KAPO	fruit?
𐂔	U+10094	128 G-	KANAKO	safflower
By liquid measure
𐂕	U+10095	130	OLE ŏlĕum	oil
𐂖	U+10096	131	VIN vinum	wine
𐂘	U+10098	133		unguent
𐂙	U+10099	135		honey
By weight
By weight or in units
Counted in units
Vessels
𐃟	U+100DF	200	sartāgo	BOILING PAN
𐃠	U+100E0	201	TRI tripūs	TRIPOD CAULDRON
𐃡	U+100E1	202	pōculum	GOBLET?
𐃢	U+100E2	203	urceus	WINE JAR?
𐃣	U+100E3	204 Ta	hirnea	EWER
𐃤	U+100E4	205 K Tn	hirnula	JUG
𐃥	U+100E5	206	HYD hydria	HYDRIA
𐃦	U+100E6	207		TRIPOD AMPHORA
𐃧	U+100E7	208	PAT patera	BOWL
𐃨	U+100E8	209	AMPH amphora	AMPHORA
𐃩	U+100E9	210		STIRRUP JAR
𐃪	U+100EA	211		WATER BOWL?
𐃫	U+100EB	212	SIT situla	WATER JAR?
𐃬	U+100EC	213	LANX lanx	COOKING BOWL
Furniture
𐃄	U+100C4	220 Ta	scamnum	FOOTSTOOL
𐃅	U+100C5	225	ALV alveus	
Weapons
𐃆	U+100C6	230 R	HAS hasta	SPEAR
𐃇	U+100C7	231 R	SAG sagitta	ARROW
𐃈	U+100C8	232 Ta	*232	AXE
𐃉	U+100C9	233 Ra		DAGGER
𐃊	U+100CA	234	GLA gladius	SWORD
Chariots
𐃌	U+100CC	240 Sc	BIG biga	WHEELED CHARIOT
𐃍	U+100CD	241 Sd Se	CUR currus	WHEEL-LESS CHARIOT
𐃎	U+100CE	242 Sf Sg	CAPS capsus	CHARIOT FRAME
𐃏	U+100CF	243 Sa So	ROTA rota	WHEEL

== Archives ==
=== Corpus ===
Inscriptions in Linear B have been found on tablets, stirrup jars and other objects. Two kinds of tablets have been found: "palm-leaf" shaped tablets, with inscriptions parallel to the long side, and larger "page" shaped tablets, divided into multiple lines. "Palm-leaf" tablets typically record a single transaction, and "page" tablets record a summary of multiple transactions.

Inscriptions are catalogued and classified by, inter alia, the location of the excavation they were found in.

Prefix	Location	Number of items and/or notes
ARM	Armenoi	1 stirrup jar inscribed "wi-na-jo".
DIM or IOL	Dimini	1 kylix shard and 1 stone (possibly a weight).
EL	Eleusis	1 stirrup jar.
GL	Gla	1 stirrup jar bearing either an inscription or a potter's mark.
HV	Agios Vasileios (Xerocampion, Laconia)	211 inscribed pieces, comprising ca. 115 tablets, 9 sealing nodules and 3 labels as of 21 September 2021.
IK	Iklaina	1 tablet.
KH	Kydonia	ca. 8 tablets, 42 stirrup jars, 2 cups and a bowl.
KN	Knossos	ca. 5500 fragments, comprising ca. 4158 tablets, 31 sealing nodules and 35 labels.
KR	Kreusis (Livadostra, Boeotia)	1 stirrup jar.
MA	Malia	4 stirrup jars.
MAM	Mameloukou Cave (Perivolia, Kissamos)	1 stirrup jar.
MED	Medeon (Steiri, Boeotia)	1 ivory seal.
MI	Midea	4 sealing nodules and 4 stirrup jars.
MY	Mycenae	88 documents.
OR	Orchomenos	1 stirrup jar bearing either an inscription or pseudo-script.
PY	Pylos	ca. 1,026 tablets, 24 sealing nodules, 22 labels and 7 stirrup jars.
TH	Thebes	368 documents. See also: Thebes tablets
TI	Tiryns	27 tablets and fragments, ca. 51 stirrup jars and a possibly inscribed skyphos.
VOL	Kastro-Palaia (Volos)	Two tablets found in 1950s excavations resurfaced in the early 2010s; a sketch depicts a third tablet.

Another 170 inscriptions in Linear B have been found on various vessels, for a total of some 6,058 known inscriptions. The primary source of vessel markings are on Inscribed Stirrup Jars, with most found at Thebes, Mycenae, Tiryns, and Khania.

For several decades scholars have worked to join tablet fragments together, thus making the tablets and their information more complete while reducing their numbers as a whole.

The oldest Linear B tablets are probably those from the Room of Chariot Tablets at Knossos, and date to the latter half of the 15th century BC. The Kafkania pebble, though from an earlier context, is not genuine. The earliest inscription from the mainland is an inscribed clay tablet found at Iklaina dating to between 1400 and 1350 BC.

Tablets are divided into series, based on the most common ideogram used in the tablet. For example, the E series deals with grain (gra). The X series is used for tablets with no ideograms, the W series is used for labels and sealings, and Z for inscribed objects other than tablets. When it is possible to identify a subgrouping of the series, based on shape, vocabulary, format, or scribal hand, it is marked by a lowercase letter (for example, the Er series).

An amber seal incised with Linear B signs was found in 2000 at Bernstorf near Kranzberg, southern Germany, and is of much debated authenticity.

=== Chronology ===
==== Timeline of Bronze Age eastern Mediterranean scripts ====
The Aegean is responsible for many of the early Greek language words that have to do with daily life such as words for tools and items that are seen every day. The sequence and the geographical spread of Cretan hieroglyphs, Linear A, and Linear B, the three overlapping, but distinct, writing systems on Bronze Age Crete, the Aegean islands, and mainland Greece are summarized as follows:

Writing system	Geographical area	Time span (Note: Beginning date refers to first attestations, the assumed origins of all scripts lie further back in the past.)
Cretan hieroglyphs	Crete	c. 2100–1700 BC
Linear A	Crete, Aegean Islands (Kea, Kythira, Milos, Santorini), and Laconia	c. 1800–1450 BC
Linear B	Crete (Knossos), and mainland (Pylos, Mycenae, Thebes, Tiryns)	c. 1425−1200 BC

==== Timeline of Linear B ====
The main archives for Linear B are associated with these stages of Late Minoan and Helladic pottery:

Relative date	Period dates	Location	Locale or tablet
LM II	1425–1390 BC	Knossos	Room of the Chariot Tablets
LH IIIA1/early LH IIIA2	1400–1370 BC	Iklaina	1 tablet found in refuse pit
LM IIIA2 or LM IIIB	1370–1340 BC or 1340–1190 BC	Knossos	main archive
LM IIIB	1340–1190 BC	Chania	tablets Sq 1, 6659, KH 3 (possibly Linear B)
LH/LM IIIB1 end (Note: LM III is equivalent to LH III from a chronological perspective.)		Chania; Mycenae; Thebes	tablets Ar 3, Gq 5, X 6 tablets from Oil Merchant group of houses Ug tablets and Wu sealings
LH IIIB2, end		Mycenae; Tiryns; Thebes; Pylos	tablets from the Citadel all tablets Of tablets and new Pelopidou Street deposit all but five tablets

Sixteen tablets found at the Megaron at Pylos are also thought to be dated to LHIIIA.

==== Controversy on the date of the Knossos tablets ====
The Knossos archive was dated by Arthur Evans to the destruction by conflagration of about 1400 BC, which would have baked and preserved the clay tablets. He dated this event to the LM II period. This view stood until Carl Blegen excavated the site of ancient Pylos in 1939 and uncovered tablets inscribed in Linear B. They were fired in the conflagration that destroyed Pylos about 1200 BC, at the end of LHIIIB. With the decipherment of Linear B by Michael Ventris in 1952, serious questions about Evans's date began to be considered. Most notably, Blegen said that the inscribed stirrup jars, which are oil flasks with stirrup-shaped handles imported from Crete around 1200, were of the same type as those dated by Evans to the destruction of 1400. Blegen found a number of similarities between 1200 BC Pylos and 1400 BC Knossos and suggested the Knossian evidence be reexamined, as he was sure of the 1200 Pylian date.

The examination uncovered a number of difficulties. The Knossos tablets had been found at various locations in the palace. Evans had not kept exact records. Recourse was had to the day books of Evans's assistant, Duncan Mackenzie, who had conducted the day-to-day excavations. There were discrepancies between the notes in the day books and Evans's excavation reports. Moreover, the two men had disagreed over the location and strata of the tablets. The results of the reinvestigation were eventually published by Palmer and Boardman, On the Knossos Tablets. It contains two works, Leonard Robert Palmer's The Find-Places of the Knossos Tablets and John Boardman's The Date of the Knossos Tablets, representing Blegen's and Evans's views respectively. Consequently, the dispute was known for a time as "the Palmer–Boardman dispute". There has been no generally accepted resolution to it yet.

=== Contents ===
The major cities and palaces used Linear B for records of disbursements of goods. Wool, sheep, and grain were some common items, often given to groups of religious people. A number of tablets also deal with military matters.

As is often the case with cuneiform tablets, when the buildings they were housed in were destroyed by fire many of the tablets were baked, which preserved them.

== Discovery and decipherment ==
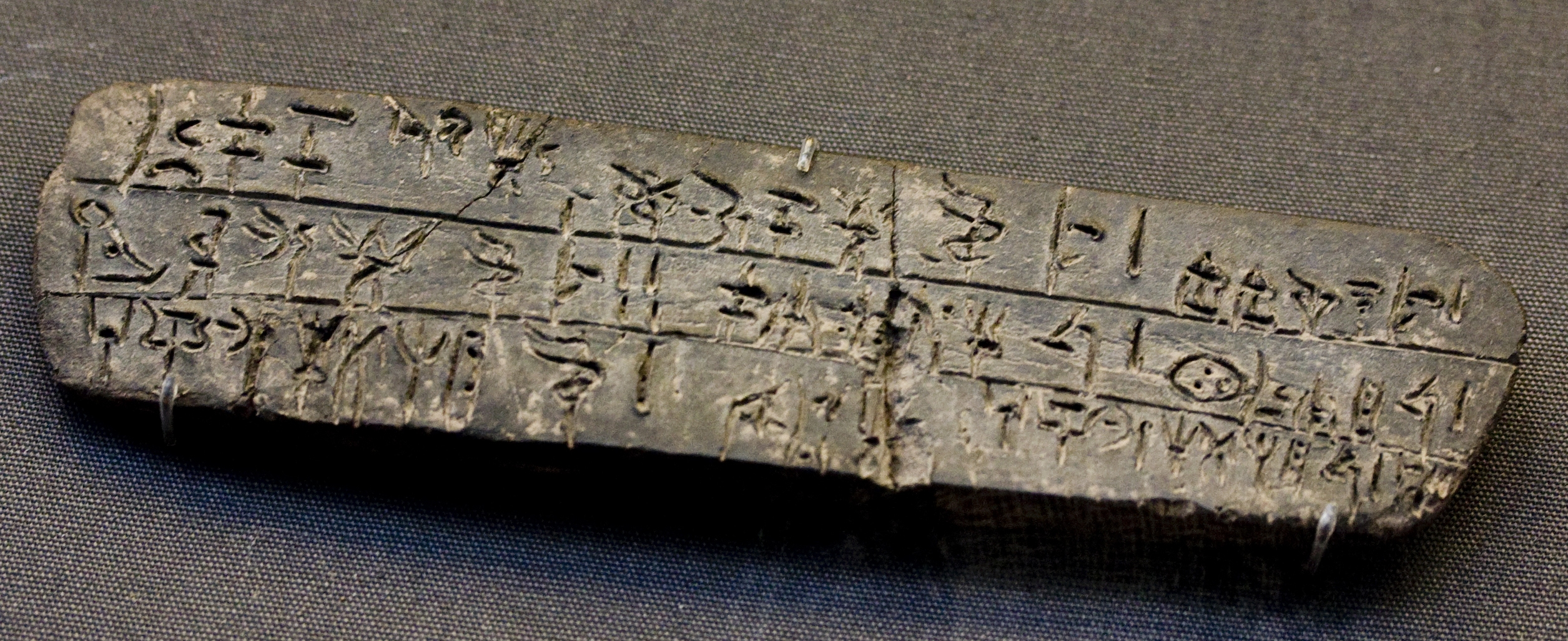
Tablet KN Fp 13, discovered by Arthur Evans

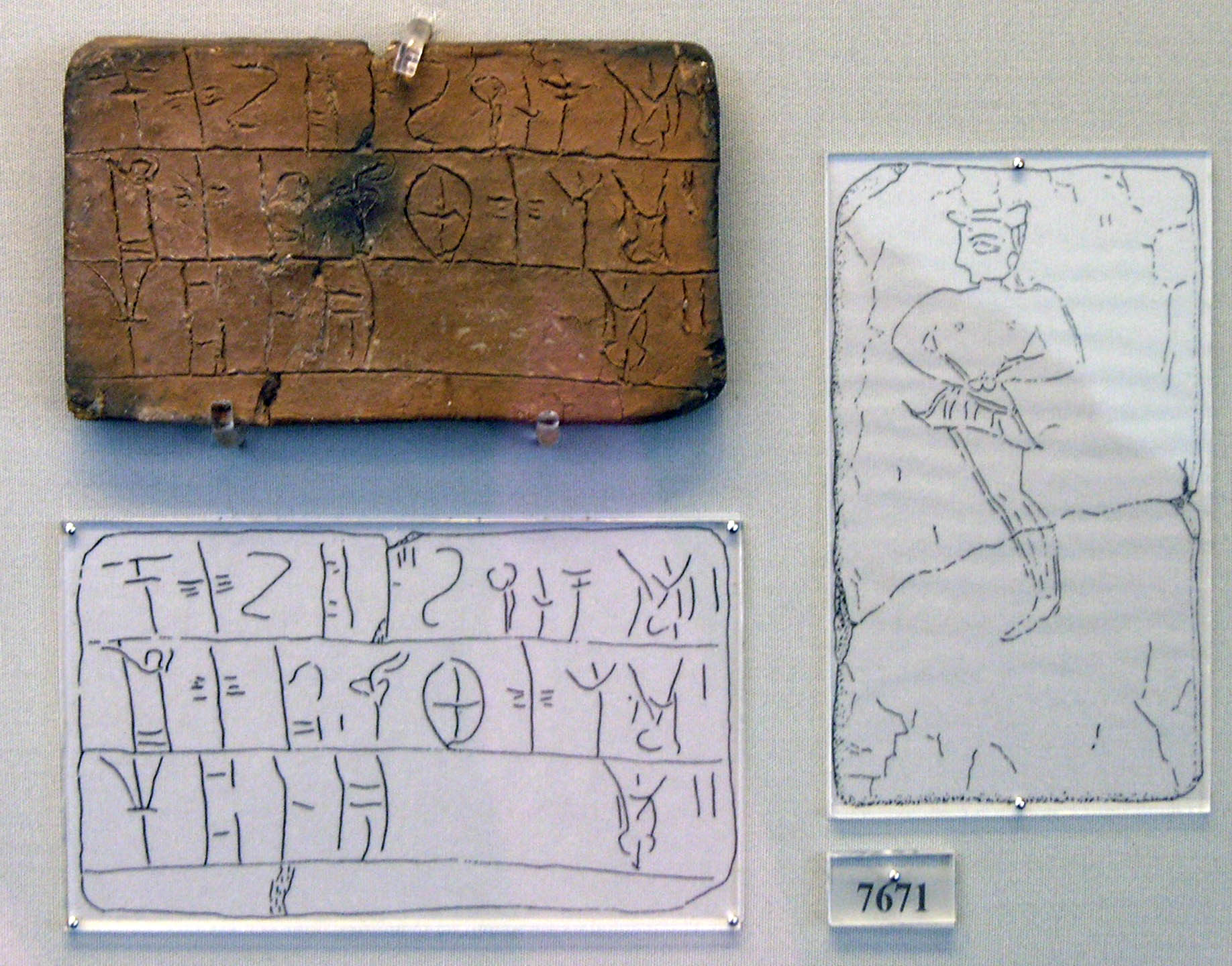
Tablet MY Oe 106 (obverse) exhibited at the Greek National Archaeological Museum. Bottom: tracing of the inscription (obverse). Right: Tracing of the reverse side depicting a male figure.

=== Ancient Greece ===
The Greeks of the historical era were unable to decipher Linear B, but its ideograms are sometimes mentioned by ancient authors. For example, Plutarch gives an account of the Spartan king Agesilaus II (r. 400–360 BC) sending a bronze tablet with "many letters marvellously old, for nothing could be made of them" to Egyptian priests in the hope they could understand them.

=== Arthur Evans's classification of scripts ===
The British archaeologist Arthur Evans, keeper of the Ashmolean Museum, was presented by Greville Chester in 1886 with a sealstone from Crete engraved with a writing he took to be Mycenaean. Heinrich Schliemann had encountered signs similar to these, but had never identified the signs clearly as writing, relating in his major work on Mycenae that "of combinations of signs resembling inscriptions I have hitherto only found three or four ...". In 1893 Evans purchased more sealstones in Athens, verifying from the antiquarian dealers that the stones came from Crete. During the next year he noticed the script on other artefacts in the Ashmolean. In 1894 he embarked for Crete in search of the script. Soon after arrival, at Knossos he saw the sign of the double axe on an excavated wall, considering this the source of the script. Subsequently, he found more stones from the various ruins being worn by Cretan women as amulets called γαλόπετρες "milk-stones", thought to encourage the production of breast milk.

Starting in 1894 Evans published his theories that the signs evidenced various phases in the development of a writing system in The Journal of Hellenic Studies, the first article being "Primitive Pictographs and a Prae-Phoenician Script from Crete". In these articles Evans distinguished between "pictographic writing" and "a linear system of writing". He did not explicitly define these terms, causing some confusion among subsequent writers concerning what he meant, but in 1898 he wrote "These linear forms indeed consist of simple geometrical figures which unlike the more complicated pictorial class were little susceptible to modification" and "That the linear or quasi-alphabetic signs ... were in the main ultimately derived from the rudely scratched line pictures belonging to the infancy of art can hardly be doubted."

Meanwhile, Evans began to negotiate for the land purchase of the Knossos site. He established the Cretan Exploration Fund, with only his own money at first, and by 1896 the fund had purchased one-fourth of Kephala Hill, on which the ruins were located, with first option to buy the rest. However, he could not obtain a firman excavation permit from the Ottoman government. He returned to Britain. In January 1897, the Christian population of Crete staged its final insurrection against the Ottoman Empire. The last Ottoman troops were ferried off the island by the British fleet on 5 December 1898. In that year also, Evans and his friends returned to complete purchase of the site. By this time, the Fund had other contributors as well. In 1899, the Constitution of a new Cretan Republic went into effect. Once Evans had received permission to excavate from the local authorities, excavation on the hill began on 23 March 1900.

According to Evans's report to the British School at Athens for that year, on 5 April, the excavators discovered the first large cache ever of Linear B tablets among the remains of a wooden box in a disused terracotta bathtub. Subsequently, caches turned up at multiple locations, including the Room of the Chariot Tablets, where over 350 pieces from four boxes were found. The tablets were 4.5 cm (1.8 in) to 19.5 cm (7.7 in) long by 1.2 cm (0.47 in) to 7.2 cm (2.8 in) wide and were scored with horizontal lines over which text was written in about 70 characters. Even in this earliest excavation report, Evans could tell that "a certain number of quasi-pictorial characters also occur which seem to have an ideographic or determinative meaning."

The excavation was over for that year by 2 June. Evans reported: "only a comparatively small proportion of the tablets were preserved in their entirety," the causes of destruction being rainfall through the roof of the storage room, crumbling of small pieces, and being thrown away by workmen who failed to identify them. A report on 6 September to the Royal Anthropological Institute of Great Britain and Ireland began to use some of the concepts characteristic of Evans's later thought: "palace of Knossos" and "palace of Minos". Appletons' Cyclopædia of American Biography, 1900, notes that Evans took up Stillman's theme that the palace was the labyrinth of mythology in which the half-bovine son of King Minos lurked. In the report, the tablets are now called a "linear script" as opposed to the "hieroglyphic or conventionalized pictographic script". The linear script has characters that are "of a free, upright, European character" and "seem to have been for the most part syllabic". Evans reasserts the ideographic idea: "a certain number are unquestionably ideographic or determinative."

The years after 1900 were consumed by excavations at Knossos and the discovery and study by Evans of tablets, with a projected comprehensive work on Cretan scripts to be called Scripta Minoa. A year before the publication of volume I, he began to drop hints that he now believed the linear script was two scripts, to be presented in the forthcoming book.

In Scripta Minoa I, which appeared in 1909, he explained that the discovery of the Phaistos Disc in July 1908 had caused him to pull the book from the presses so that he could include the disk by permission, as it had not yet been published. On the next page he mentioned that he was also including by permission of Federico Halbherr of the Italian Mission in Crete unpublished tablets from Hagia Triada written in a linear script of "Class A". To what degree if any Halbherr was responsible for Evans's division of the "linear script" into "Class A" and "Class B" is not stated. The Knossos tablets were of Class B, so that Evans could have perceived Class A only in tablets from elsewhere, and so recently that he needed permission to include the examples.

Evans summarized the differences between the two scripts as "type" or "form of script"; that is, varieties in the formation and arrangement of the characters. For example, he says "the clay documents belonging to Class A show a certain approximation in their forms to those presenting the hieroglyphic inscriptions ... The system of numerals is also in some respects intermediate between that of the hieroglyphic documents and that of the linear Class B."

The first volume covered "the Hieroglyphic and Primitive Linear Classes" in three parts: the "pre-Phoenician Scripts of Crete", the "Pictorial Script" and "the Phaistos Disk". One or two more volumes publishing the Linear A and Linear B tablets were planned, but Evans ran out of time; the project required more than one man could bring to it. For a good many of the years left to him, he was deeply enmeshed in war and politics in the Balkans. When he did return to Knossos, completion and publication of the palace excavations took priority. His greatest work, Palace of Minos, came out in 1935. It did include scattered descriptions of tablets. He died in 1941, soon after Nazi forces invaded Crete.

The Knossos tablets had remained in the museum at Irakleion, Crete, where many of them now were missing. The unpublished second volume consisted of notes by Evans and plates and fonts created by Clarendon Press. In 1939, Carl Blegen had uncovered the Pylos Tablets; pressure was mounting to finish Scripta Minoa II. After Evans's death, Alice Kober, assistant to John Myres and a major transcriber of the Knossos tablets, prompted Myres to come back from retirement and finish the work. Emmett L. Bennett, Jr. added more transcriptions. The second volume came out in 1952 with Evans cited as author and Myres as editor, just before the discovery that Linear B writes an early form of Greek. An impatient Ventris and Chadwick declared: "Two generations of scholars had been cheated of the opportunity to work constructively on the problem."

=== Early attempts ===
Despite the limited source materials, during this time there were efforts to decipher the newly discovered Cretan script. Australian classicist Florence Stawell published an interpretation of the Phaistos Disc in the April 1911 issue of The Burlington Magazine. She followed this with the book A Clue to the Cretan Scripts, published in 1931. Stawell declared all three Cretan script forms to represent early Homeric Greek, and offered her attempts at translations. Also in 1931, F. G. Gordon's Through Basque to Minoan was published by the Oxford University Press. Gordon attempted to prove a close link between the Basque language and Linear B, without lasting success.

In 1949, Bedřich Hrozný published Les Inscriptions Crétoises, Essai de déchiffrement, a proposed decipherment of the Cretan scripts. Hrozny was internationally renowned as the translator of Hittite cuneiform decades previously. His Minoan translations into academic French, though, proved to be considerably subjective, and incorrect.

From the 1930s to 1950s there was correspondence between, and papers published by, various international academic figures. These included Johannes Sundwall, K. D. Ktistopoulos, Ernst Sittig, and V. I. Georgiev. None of them succeeded with decipherment, yet they added to knowledge and debate.

=== Alice Kober's triplets ===
About the same time, Alice Kober studied Linear B and managed to construct grids, linking similar symbols in groups of threes. Kober noticed that a number of Linear B words had common roots and suffixes. This led her to believe that Linear B represented an inflected language, with nouns changing their endings depending on their case. However, some characters in the middle of the words seemed to correspond with neither a root nor a suffix. Because this effect was found in other known languages, Kober surmised that the odd characters were bridging syllables, with the beginning of the syllable belonging to the root and the end belonging to the suffix. This was a reasonable assumption, since Linear B had far too many characters to be considered alphabetic and too few to be logographic; therefore, each character should represent a syllable. Kober's systematic approach allowed her to demonstrate the existence of three grammatical cases and identify several pairs of signs that shared vowels or consonants with one another.

Kober also showed that the two-symbol word for 'total' at the end of livestock and personnel lists, had a different symbol for gender. This gender change with one letter, usually a vowel, is most frequent in Indo-European languages. Kober had rejected any speculation on the language represented, preferring painstaking cataloguing and analysis of the actual symbols, though she did believe it likely that Linear A and Linear B represented different languages.

=== Emmett L. Bennett's transcription conventions ===
The convention for numbering the symbols still in use today was first devised by Emmett L. Bennett Jr. Working alongside fellow academic Alice Kober, by 1950 Bennett had deciphered the metrical system, based on his intensive study of Linear B tablets unearthed at Pylos. He concluded that those tablets contained exactly the same script as the Linear B found at Knossos, and he classified and assigned identification numbers to the Linear B signs as he prepared a publication on the Pylos tablets. Like Kober, Bennett was also an early proponent of the idea that Linear A and B represented different languages. His book The Pylos Tablets became a crucial resource for Michael Ventris, who later described it as "a wonderful piece of work".

=== Michael Ventris's identification as Greek ===
Illustration of a Linear B tablet from Pylos

In 1935, the British School at Athens was celebrating its fiftieth anniversary with an exhibition at Burlington House, London. Among the speakers was Arthur Evans, then 84 years old; a teenage Michael Ventris was present in the audience. In 1940, the 18-year-old Ventris had an article Introducing the Minoan Language published in the American Journal of Archaeology. After wartime service as a navigator with RAF Bomber Command, and a post-war year in occupied Germany, he returned to civilian life, and completed qualification as an architect. Ventris continued with his interest in Linear B, corresponding with known scholars, who usually but not always replied.

Ventris and John Chadwick, a university lecturer in Ancient Greek philology, performed the bulk of the decipherment of Linear B between 1951 and 1953. At first Ventris chose his own numbering method, but later switched to Bennett's system. His initial decipherment was achieved using Kober's classification tables, to which he applied his own theories. Some Linear B tablets had been discovered on the Greek mainland. Noticing that certain symbol combinations appeared only on the tablets found in Crete, he conjectured that these might be names of places on the island. This proved to be correct. Working with the symbols he could decipher from this, Ventris soon unlocked much text and determined that the underlying language of Linear B was in fact Greek. This contradicted general scientific views of the time, and indeed Ventris himself had previously agreed with Evans's hypothesis that Linear B was not Greek. Ventris's first public announcement of his breakthrough came on 1 July 1952, on BBC Radio, with Ventris describing the language of Linear B as "[a] difficult and archaic Greek, seeing that it's five hundred years older than Homer, and written in a rather abbreviated form, but Greek nevertheless." Ventris's discovery was of significance in demonstrating a Greek-speaking Minoan-Mycenaean culture on Crete, and thus presenting Greek in writing centuries earlier than had been previously accepted. Chadwick, who helped Ventris develop his decipherment of the text and discover the vocabulary and grammar of Mycenaean Greek, noted:

That any Linear B tablets are written in a language other than Greek still remains to be demonstrated; but that words and usages not exactly paralleled in later Greek occur is both certain and to be expected. But we must not resort to "non-Greek" whenever we come up against an insoluble problem.

The first edition of their book, Documents in Mycenaean Greek, was published in 1956, shortly after Ventris's death in an automobile accident.

The Ventris decipherment did not immediately meet with universal approval, and was initially viewed with some scepticism. Professor A. J. Beattie of Edinburgh published his doubts in the later 1950s. Saul Levin of the State University of New York considered that Linear B was partly Greek but with an earlier substrate, in his 1964 book The Linear B controversy reexamined. Nevertheless, starting from the mid-50s onward the Ventris discovery came to be viewed favourably by scholars, such as professors Carl Blegen and Sterling Dow, which along with Ventris's 1954 article, resulted in the discovery's wide acceptance.

== Unicode ==
Linear B was added to the Unicode Standard in April 2003 with the release of version 4.0.

The Linear B Syllabary block is U+10000–U+1007F. The Linear B Ideograms block is U+10080–U+100FF. The Unicode block for the related Aegean Numbers is U+10100–U+1013F.

A variety of fonts encode Linear B.

Linear B Syllabary^{[1]}^{[2]} Official Unicode Consortium code chart (PDF)
	0	1	2	3	4	5	6	7	8	9	A	B	C	D	E	F
U+1000x	𐀀	𐀁	𐀂	𐀃	𐀄	𐀅	𐀆	𐀇	𐀈	𐀉	𐀊	𐀋		𐀍	𐀎	𐀏
U+1001x	𐀐	𐀑	𐀒	𐀓	𐀔	𐀕	𐀖	𐀗	𐀘	𐀙	𐀚	𐀛	𐀜	𐀝	𐀞	𐀟
U+1002x	𐀠	𐀡	𐀢	𐀣	𐀤	𐀥	𐀦		𐀨	𐀩	𐀪	𐀫	𐀬	𐀭	𐀮	𐀯
U+1003x	𐀰	𐀱	𐀲	𐀳	𐀴	𐀵	𐀶	𐀷	𐀸	𐀹	𐀺		𐀼	𐀽		𐀿
U+1004x	𐁀	𐁁	𐁂	𐁃	𐁄	𐁅	𐁆	𐁇	𐁈	𐁉	𐁊	𐁋	𐁌	𐁍		
U+1005x	𐁐	𐁑	𐁒	𐁓	𐁔	𐁕	𐁖	𐁗	𐁘	𐁙	𐁚	𐁛	𐁜	𐁝		
U+1006x																
U+1007x																
Notes 1.As of Unicode version 18.0 2.Grey areas indicate non-assigned code points

Linear B Ideograms^{[1]}^{[2]} Official Unicode Consortium code chart (PDF)
	0	1	2	3	4	5	6	7	8	9	A	B	C	D	E	F
U+1008x	𐂀	𐂁	𐂂	𐂃	𐂄	𐂅	𐂆	𐂇	𐂈	𐂉	𐂊	𐂋	𐂌	𐂍	𐂎	𐂏
U+1009x	𐂐	𐂑	𐂒	𐂓	𐂔	𐂕	𐂖	𐂗	𐂘	𐂙	𐂚	𐂛	𐂜	𐂝	𐂞	𐂟
U+100Ax	𐂠	𐂡	𐂢	𐂣	𐂤	𐂥	𐂦	𐂧	𐂨	𐂩	𐂪	𐂫	𐂬	𐂭	𐂮	𐂯
U+100Bx	𐂰	𐂱	𐂲	𐂳	𐂴	𐂵	𐂶	𐂷	𐂸	𐂹	𐂺	𐂻	𐂼	𐂽	𐂾	𐂿
U+100Cx	𐃀	𐃁	𐃂	𐃃	𐃄	𐃅	𐃆	𐃇	𐃈	𐃉	𐃊	𐃋	𐃌	𐃍	𐃎	𐃏
U+100Dx	𐃐	𐃑	𐃒	𐃓	𐃔	𐃕	𐃖	𐃗	𐃘	𐃙	𐃚	𐃛	𐃜	𐃝	𐃞	𐃟
U+100Ex	𐃠	𐃡	𐃢	𐃣	𐃤	𐃥	𐃦	𐃧	𐃨	𐃩	𐃪	𐃫	𐃬	𐃭	𐃮	𐃯
U+100Fx	𐃰	𐃱	𐃲	𐃳	𐃴	𐃵	𐃶	𐃷	𐃸	𐃹	𐃺					
Notes 1.As of Unicode version 18.0 2.Grey areas indicate non-assigned code points

Aegean Numbers^{[1]}^{[2]} Official Unicode Consortium code chart (PDF)
	0	1	2	3	4	5	6	7	8	9	A	B	C	D	E	F
U+1010x	𐄀	𐄁	𐄂					𐄇	𐄈	𐄉	𐄊	𐄋	𐄌	𐄍	𐄎	𐄏
U+1011x	𐄐	𐄑	𐄒	𐄓	𐄔	𐄕	𐄖	𐄗	𐄘	𐄙	𐄚	𐄛	𐄜	𐄝	𐄞	𐄟
U+1012x	𐄠	𐄡	𐄢	𐄣	𐄤	𐄥	𐄦	𐄧	𐄨	𐄩	𐄪	𐄫	𐄬	𐄭	𐄮	𐄯
U+1013x	𐄰	𐄱	𐄲	𐄳				𐄷	𐄸	𐄹	𐄺	𐄻	𐄼	𐄽	𐄾	𐄿
Notes 1.As of Unicode version 18.0 2.Grey areas indicate non-assigned code points

== See also ==
- Aegean civilizations
- Aegean numerals
- Cypriot syllabary
- Cypro-Minoan syllabary
- Linear A
- Old European script
- Proto-Greek language
- PY Ta 641
- Trojan script
- The Riddle of the Labyrinth, a 2013 popular book detailing the decipherment of Linear B
