= Emmett L. Bennett Jr. =

American classicist and philologist

- Born: July 18, 1918
- Died: December 15, 2011 (aged 93)

Academic background
- Education: University of Cincinnati

Academic work
- Discipline: classics and philology

Emmett Leslie Bennett Jr. (July 18, 1918 – December 15, 2011) was an American classicist and philologist whose systematic catalog of its symbols led to the solution of reading Linear B, a 3,300-year-old syllabary used for writing Mycenaean Greek hundreds of years before the Greek alphabet was developed. Archaeologist Arthur Evans had discovered Linear B in 1900 during his excavations at Knossos on the Greek island of Crete and spent decades trying to comprehend its writings until his death in 1941. Bennett and Alice Kober cataloged the 80 symbols used in the script in his 1951 work The Pylos Tablets, which provided linguist John Chadwick and amateur scholar Michael Ventris with the vital clues needed to finally decipher Linear B in 1952.

Bennett was born on July 18, 1918, in Minneapolis and attended the University of Cincinnati, where he studied the classics, earning bachelor's, master's and doctoral degrees, and was a student of the American archaeologist Carl Blegen, who had uncovered a series of tablets inscribed in Linear B during excavations he had conducted at Pylos in 1939. Bennett worked as a cryptanalyst on the American effort decoding Japanese ciphers during World War II, despite not knowing any Japanese.

After beginning his academic career at Yale University and the University of Texas, Bennett spent almost three decades on the faculty of the University of Wisconsin–Madison before he retired in 1988. Bennett's papers were acquired and have been cataloged and organized by the Program in Aegean Scripts and Prehistory at the University of Texas. Bennett was awarded the Gold Medal of the Archaeological Institute of America in 2001 in recognition of "outstanding contributions to the field of archaeology" for his role in cataloging Linear B texts and the development of the field of Mycenaean studies.

Bennett died in Madison, Wisconsin at the age of 93. He was survived by two daughters, three sons and four grandchildren.
