= Sterling Dow =

American archaeologist (1903–1995)

Sterling Dow (19 November 1903, Portland, Maine – 9 January 1995, Cambridge, Massachusetts) was an American classical archaeologist, epigrapher, and professor of archaeology at Harvard University.

After secondary education at Phillips Exeter Academy, Dow matriculated in 1921 at Harvard University and graduated there in 1925 with a bachelor's degree in philosophy. As the winner of the Fiske Scholarship, Dow spent the academic year 1925–1926 studying ancient history at Trinity College, Cambridge. Returning to Harvard in 1926, he graduated with an M.A. in 1928 and a Ph.D. in history in 1936. His doctoral supervisor was the Canadian ancient historian William Scott Ferguson (1875–1954). Dow married Elizabeth Sanderson Flagg in 1931. Sterling and Elizabeth Dow spent the years from 1931 to 1936 in Athens, Greece and often worked together on making paper impressions of stone inscriptions unearthed from the Ancient Agora of Athens by excavations sponsored by the American School of Classical Studies.

During the early 1930s, he perfected a system of making paper impressions of ancient Greek inscriptions. The method allowed scholars to read inscriptions more completely and clearly than had previously been possible. At the same time, he discovered a kleroterion, a mechanical device that the Athenians had used to allot offices by random choice rather than through election.

A Guggenheim Fellowship for the academic year 1934–1935 and various Harvard awards supported Dow in Athens. He benefitted from working with the epigrapher Johannes Kirchner (1859–1940). During his career Dow was awarded two more Guggenheim Fellowships (in 1959 and 1966).

Dow's colleagues in Athens included Bert Hodge Hill, Homer Thompson, William Bell Dinsmoor, Virginia Grace, and Lucy Shoe. At Harvard, Dow was an instructor from 1936 to 1941, an associate professor from 1941 to 1948, Professor of History and Greek from 1946 to 1948, and the John E. Hudson Professor of Archaeology from 1949 to 1970, when he retired as professor emeritus. During WW II, he was given an academic leave of absence and served as a member of the Office of Strategic Services in Washington, DC, and Egypt. During the academic year 1966–1967 he was on sabbatical in Athens as the Annual Professor at the American School of Classical Studies.

From 1970 to 1977 he was a professor of Greek civilization and history at Boston College. For the academic year 1977–1978, he was a professor of classics at Vassar College.

As a scholar Dow was known primarily for his contributions to Greek epigraphy and history, but his range was remarkable. He wrote five books and more than 150 articles and reviews. Many of his studies illuminated the political and social institutions of Athens and the men who were involved in them, but he also wrote important papers on the historical setting of the Homeric poems, on religious calendars, and on early writing and literacy. He gained international recognition for his deduction, on historical grounds, that the famous Linear B tablets of the second millennium B.C. were inscribed with an early form of Greek, a deduction confirmed when the tablets were finally deciphered in 1953.

Dow was given three honorary degrees. He was a founder of Archaeology magazine and the American Research Center in Egypt. From 1946 to 1948 he was the president of the Archaeological Institute of America. In 1984 Duke University Press published a festschrift in honor of his 80th birthday. Ohio State University's Center for Epigraphical and Paleographical Studies administers The Sterling and Elizabeth Dow Fellowship in Greek epigraphy and history.

Dow's wife died in 1990 and he died in 1995. There was a memorial service for Dow in Harvard's Memorial Church on 8 April 1995.
