= John Chadwick =

English classical scholar (1920–1998)

- Born: 21 May 1920; Mortlake, Surrey, England
- Died: 24 November 1998 (aged 78)
- Occupations: Linguist, scholar

Academic background
- Education: Corpus Christi College, Cambridge

Signature
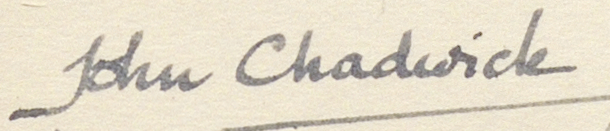

John Chadwick, FBA (21 May 1920 – 24 November 1998) was an English linguist and classical scholar who was most notable for the decipherment, with Michael Ventris, of Linear B.

== Early life, education and wartime service ==
John Chadwick was born at 18 Christ Church Road, Mortlake, Surrey, on 21 May 1920, the younger son of Margaret Pamela (née Bray) and Fred Chadwick, civil servant. He was educated at St Paul's School and Corpus Christi College, Cambridge.

Chadwick volunteered for the Royal Navy in 1940 after completing the first year of his classics course at Cambridge. At first he served in the Mediterranean as an ordinary seaman aboard the light cruiser HMS Coventry and saw action when his ship was torpedoed by an Italian submarine and dive-bombed. In 1942, he was sent ashore at Alexandria for an interview by the Chief of Naval Intelligence and was immediately assigned to intelligence duties in Egypt and promoted to Temporary Sub Lieutenant in the RNVR. Thereafter he worked on Italian codes. Chadwick deduced from some R/T traffic meant to be handled at Bletchley Park that a British submarine had been sunk near Taranto.

In 1944, he was transferred to Bletchley Park ("Station X"), learned Japanese, and worked on reading the encoded messages sent by the Japanese naval representatives in Stockholm and Berlin.

After the end of the war in 1945, he returned to his studies at Cambridge, graduating with First Class Honours in Classics Part II, with a distinction in his special subject, linguistics. While studying at Corpus Christi College, he attempted, with some of his fellow students, to use cryptographic methods to decipher the "Minoan Linear Script B". They were already aware at the time of the work of Michael Ventris. They stopped working actively on the problem owing to a lack of published data from inscriptions.

== Career ==
In 1950 he published his first scholarly work, an edition of The Medical Works of Hippocrates, co-authored with his cousin, William Neville Mann, a distinguished physician. After finishing his degree, he joined the staff of the Oxford Latin Dictionary before beginning a Classics lectureship at Cambridge in 1952. In July that year he heard a radio broadcast by Michael Ventris about his work on Linear B and offered his help as "a mere philologist". The men began to collaborate on the progressive decipherment of Linear B, writing Documents in Mycenean Greek in 1956, following a controversial first paper three years earlier. Chadwick's philological ideas were applied to Ventris's initial theory that Linear B was an early form of Greek rather than another Mediterranean language.

After Ventris's death, Chadwick became the figurehead of the Linear B work, writing the accessible and popular book The Decipherment of Linear B in 1958 and revising Documents in Mycenaean Greek in 1978.

He retired in 1984, by which time he had become the fourth (and last) Perceval Maitland Laurence Reader in Classics at Cambridge. He continued his scholarship until his death, being an active member of several international societies and writing numerous popular and academic articles. He was also a Fellow of the British Academy and of Downing College, Cambridge.

== Family ==
Chadwick married Joan Hill in 1947. They had one son, Camden Chadwick.

== Publications ==
- Ventris, Michael; Chadwick, John (1953). "Evidence for Greek Dialect in the Mycenaean Archives". The Journal of Hellenic Studies. 73: 84–103. doi:10.2307/628239. JSTOR 628239. S2CID 163873642.
- Chadwick, John (1958). The Decipherment of Linear B. Second edition (1990). Cambridge UP. ISBN 0-521-39830-4.
- Chadwick, John (1972). "The Mycenaean Documents". In McDonald, William; Rapp, George (eds.). The Minnesota Messenia Expedition: Reconstructing a Bronze Age Regional Environment. Minneapolis: University of Minnesota Press. pp. 100–116. ISBN 0-8166-0636-6.
- Chadwick, John (1976). The Mycenaean World. Cambridge UP. ISBN 0-521-29037-6.
- Ventris, Michael; Chadwick, John (1956). Documents in Mycenaean Greek. Second edition (1974). Cambridge UP. ISBN 0-521-08558-6.

== Decorations and awards ==
- 1992: Austrian Decoration for Science and Art
- 1997: International Antonio Feltrinelli Prize

== See also ==
- Mycenaean Greek, Mycenaean Greece
- Michael Ventris
