= The Virgins (novel) =

Book by Pamela Erens

- First edition
- Author: Pamela Erens
- Cover artist: Alexis Mire (photo); Diane Chonette (design)
- Language: English
- Publisher: Tin House Books (US); John Murray (UK, 2014)
- Publication date: August 6, 2013
- Publication place: United States
- Media type: Print
- Pages: 288
- ISBN: 1-935639-62-5

The Virgins is the second novel by American author Pamela Erens, published in 2013 by Tin House Books. It received accolades from many sources including The New York Times, The New Yorker and Vanity Fair. Publishers Weekly named it one of the best boarding school books of all time.

== Plot introduction ==
The novel is set in 1979 in Auburn Academy, an exclusive boarding school in New Hampshire (based on Phillips Exeter Academy, where Erens herself was a student). It is narrated by Bruce Bennett-Jones, who looks back on the overtly demonstrative romance between Aviva Rossner, the Jewish daughter of a wealthy physician, and Seung Jung, a Korean American with demanding parents and a penchant for drugs. The tale, though told as fact, is very much the imaginings of the love-struck Bruce as he pieces together Aviva and Seung's relationship from his voyeuristic observations, though he himself plays a key role in the novel's tragic climax.

== Inspiration ==
As Erens explains in an interview with the publisher, "I'd long wanted to write a novel that captured something about the 1970s and being a teenager then. Most teenagers in the seventies were born in the sixties—that is, they were the first American kids to be surrounded from the very start by all kinds of new ideas about freedom and sexuality. I had all three of my characters from the beginning, but my original idea was that there would be a more traditional love triangle. Somewhere pretty early on I came across an article by Joyce Carol Oates in the New York Review of Books on the work of James Salter. I am an enormous Salter fan and I had read his story collections and his novels A Sport and a Pastime and Light Years. The Oates article reminded me of the setup of A Sport and a Pastime—a male narrator tells the story of a romance in which he doesn't take part. That narrator describes encounters and events he couldn't possibly have been a witness to. Suddenly I knew that was what I wanted to do with my own novel."

In an article for her UK publisher, Erens identified five novels which "helped me feel that the task of writing about teens and sex was an achievable one":

1. Endless Love, Scott Spencer (1979)
2. If Beale Street Could Talk, James Baldwin (1974)
3. The Folded Leaf, William Maxwell (1945)
4. The Lover, Marguerite Duras (1984)
5. That Night, Alice McDermott (1987)

== Reception ==
John Irving (like Erens a past student at Phillps Exeter) writing in The New York Times praises the characterization of the narrator: "He's a villain and a narrator Erens should be proud of — a marvel of male-adolescent betrayal and self-pity...Erens does a compelling job of making us hate him, but Bennett-Jones is the ideal narrator for this sexual tragedy. The lovers are the ones we care about, and Erens is no less compelling at making us love them. Bennett-Jones is the cruelest storyteller imaginable, as he should be. This is a love story best told by the one who's been left out." Irving concludes, "Pamela Erens and her monstrous Bennett-Jones have told a devastating story. The Virgins is a brutal book, but it's flawlessly executed and irrefutably true."

Margaret Wappler in the Los Angeles Times is also full of praise: "It's rare to find a book that summons the delicate emotional state of teenagers — especially when it comes to sex — without being precious or cynical, but Pamela Erens' "The Virgins" beautifully manages that feat...The world hardly needs another elite prep school novel, but this one rises to the occasion, line by lovely line...Erens has created a moody yet romantic set piece in which every gesture is loaded with meaning, every touch infused with potential ecstasy or calamity. The ending is not totally satisfying in terms of access to Aviva's state of mind, but it isn't afraid to plumb a dark kind of grace."

Lucy Scholes in The Independent concludes, "The adolescent imagination in particular is a powerful and dangerous thing; as Bruce explains, 'We beginners experienced sex as psyche more than body.' Erens brilliantly captures the dark side of adolescence, a haunting sensuality that lingers in the 'private theatre' of Bruce's mind long into adulthood. On par with the likes of Jeffrey Eugenides's The Virgin Suicides and Sheila Kohler's Cracks, The Virgins is a devastating tour de force that sets a new bar for unreliable narrators."
