= James F. Low =

James Frederick Low
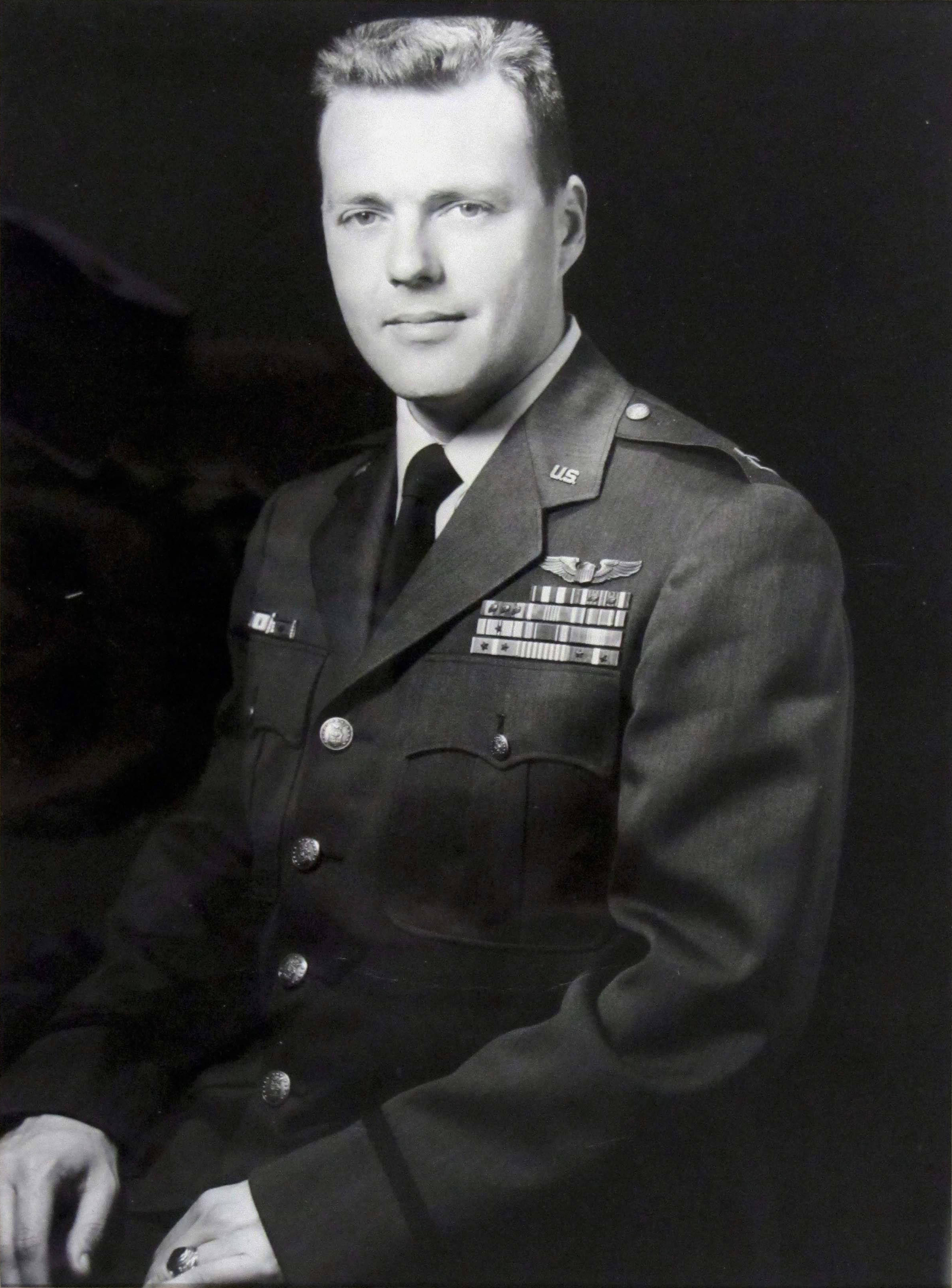
- Low as a Lieutenant
- Born: 10 September 1925; Sausalito, California
- Died: 14 December 2017 (aged 92); Davenport, Florida
- Burial place: Arlington National Cemetery
- Military career
- Allegiance: United States of America
- Branch: United States Navy; United States Air Force
- Service years: 1943-1946; 1950-1968
- Rank: Major
- Nicknames: Dad, The Major
- Conflicts: World War II; Korean War; Vietnam War
- Awards: Silver Star (2); Distinguished Flying Cross (4); Prisoner of War Medal

Major James Frederick Low (10 September 1925 – 14 December 2017) was a United States Air Force officer who served in the Korean War achieving Flying ace status and in the Vietnam War where he was shot down and captured.

== Military career ==
He served in the United States Navy from 1943 to 1946. He graduated with a degree in bachelor of science at University of California, Berkeley.

He joined the United States Air Force as an aviation cadet in November 1950 and graduated in December 1951. He attended jet transition training to the F-86 Sabre at Williams Air Force Base and aerial gunnery school at Nellis Air Force Base. In April 1951 he was assigned to the 335th Fighter-Interceptor Squadron, 4th Fighter Interceptor Wing, flying the F-86 in the Korean War. He soon gained a reputation for breaking away from his formation to pursue MiGs and became an ace credited with six MiG-15 kills in two months. He returned to the US on temporary duty in July 1952 to lecture on the radar gunsight. He returned to South Korea in October 1952 and rejoined the 4th Fighter Interceptor Wing and shot down a further three MiG-15s.

Low flew with James Salter and was the model for the Ed Pell character in Salter's novel The Hunters. In the 1958 movie adaptation the Pell character was played by Robert Wagner and this portrayal led to Low being interviewed and disparaging Salter as a poor fighter pilot.

In 1956 he was assigned to the 325th Fighter-Interceptor Squadron at Hamilton Air Force Base.

During the Vietnam War he served in the 555th Tactical Fighter Squadron based out of Udorn Royal Thai Air Force Base (Udorn RTAFB) in North Eastern Thailand. While flying F-4D Phantom II 66-7631 he was shot down by a Vietnam People's Air Force MiG-21 on 16 December 1967, although no VPAF claim was made. He and his co-pilot successfully ejected and were held as prisoners of war in North Vietnam. Although Low was tortured at first, he was careful to refer to the experience as “punishment” and to hide the fact that he was an ace. The North Vietnamese had read about the other two Korean War aces held by them, Robinson Risner and James H. Kasler in the American press, but they did not learn about Low's status until after he was released. He and Major Fred Thompson and Captain Joe Carpenter accepted an early release offer and were released to the American Friends Service Committee on 18 July 1968 and returned to the US on 2 August 1968.

== Later life ==
Low died on 14 December 2017 and was buried at Arlington National Cemetery.
