= Devil's Garden =

Devil's Garden or variants may refer to:

== Arts and entertainment ==
- The Devil's Garden, a 1913 book by W. B. Maxwell
  - The Devil's Garden (film), a lost 1920 silent film based the book
- The Devil's Garden (Docx novel), by Edward Docx, 2011
- Devil's Garden, a 2009 novel by Ace Atkins
- The Devil's Garden, a 1992 novel by Peter Pinney

== Places in the United States ==
- Devils Garden (Arches National Park), Utah
- Devils Garden (Garfield County, Utah), Utah
- Devils Garden volcanic field, Oregon
- Devils Garden, a place in Riverside County, California

== Other uses ==
- Devil's garden, a stand of trees in the Amazon Rainforest of at most three tree species and the ant Myrmelachista schumanni
- Devil's gardens, World War II defensive positions at El Alamein
