= BookBrowse =

- Owner: BookBrowsers LLC
- Website: www.bookbrowse.com
- Launched: 1997

BookBrowse is an online magazine and website that provides book reviews, author interviews, book previews, and reading guides. The magazine is independent of publishers and does not sell books that it reviews. The site offers both free and premium content that is available by subscription.

== History ==
BookBrowse was founded by Davina and Paul Morgan-Witts in 1997. The idea for the website came from a trip to a bookstore the same year. The visit to the bookstore was cut short and they decided to look on the internet for book information, finding very little at that time. This brought on the idea to create something that allowed readers to flip through various pages of a book, similar to at a bookstore. BookBrowse was launched allowing visitors to view excerpts of books, later evolving into publishing of book reviews.

The website grew in popularity and in 1998 was featured by Yahoo! as its Incredibly Useful Site of the Day. In the early 2000s, it started publishing its own reviews of various books as well as publishing reader reviews. BookBrowse also launched an online magazine that is published twice-monthly, containing reviews, previews, articles, book club recommendations, and author interviews. It also provides a book club section for those seeking advice on starting a book club and finding suitable books to read, as well as book reviews by active book clubs.

The site generates revenue by offering subscription access to premium features outside the content it publishes for free, including offering subscription access for public libraries. One feature of the website is that BookBrowse does not sell books that it reviews. BookBrowse also conducts and publishes author interviews. Published interviews have included Jennifer Egan, Elisabeth Tova Bailey, John Twelve Hawks, and Kathryn Stockett.

In July 2015, BookBrowse published a research report titled Book Clubs in the USA. In February 2019, BookBrowse published a research report titled The Inner Lives of Book Clubs, and in November 2020 it published a third in its series of reports titled Book Clubs in Lockdown

== Awards and recognition ==
In 2015 and 2017, BookBrowse received a Modern Library Award from LibraryWorks in recognition of it being a top product in the library industry. In 2020 and 2024, BookBrowse entered the Modern Library Awards again, and was awarded Platinum in both years

== See also ==
- Literary criticism
- Literary magazine
