= The Devil's Garden (Docx novel) =

2011 novel by Edward Docx

- Author: Edward Docx
- Language: English
- Set in: South America
- Published: 2011
- Publisher: Picador

The Devil's Garden is the third novel written by British author Edward Docx. It was published in 2011 by Picador and is a contemporary novel set on an Amazonian river station in the South American jungle.

His other novels are The Calligrapher (2003) and Self Help (2007).

== Synopsis ==
The Devil’s Garden tells the story of the scientist Dr Forle, living on an Amazon River station deep in the South American jungle. He and his international crew of colleagues are working with remote tribes, studying large clearings made by ants in the forest, which they call ‘devil’s gardens’. Forle hopes the project will change the way people think about evolution and the nature of life itself. A Colonel and a Judge arrive at the river station purporting to have come to register the local Indian tribes to vote, yet on the night of their arrival Forle witnesses an act of torture against a local tribesman. Forle and his colleagues are soon caught up in a small war between the tribes, renegade soldiers and cocaine growers.

== Themes and background ==
Docx has said that he began The Devil's Garden came when he first travelled in the Amazon in 2002. He visited a science station up river from Puerto Maldonado and met some scientists working on ants. He began to write the novel while he was there and finished the book once he had returned to London. In an interview, he states that the novel emulates the Amazonian river ‘getting deeper and darker and fuller.’ He has also said that 'it is about religion and science, about the ancient and the modern, about love and exploitation, about the clash between the individual and the powerful opposing forces that seek to determine our future'.

The book has been described as Conradian fable for our time, but Docx has said elsewhere that his main interests were anthropological - and that the novel is about precisely the opposite: that there is nowhere left on the globe to hide and that the possibility of a society or individual living beyond the reaches of contemporary culture has all but disappeared.

== Reception ==
Critical reception was generally favourable - many critics praising the intelligence of the novel as well as its spare style of the writing which is a mixture of prose and scientific journal entries.

In The Guardian, for example, Giles Foden wrote that Docx's third novel is ‘Full of intellectual provocations as it is of suspenseful turns’.

The Independent on Sunday noted that 'This poisoned Eden throbs with intensity and delivers a gut punch that leaves you reeling'. The Economist described it as 'written in punchy action-packed paragraphs.'

According to The Spectator; 'Docx is a master of disquiet... Arguably, the plot is slightly over-peopled, but they're all portrayed with great artistry and imagination'.

Several critics have noted the difference in style between Docx's works.
