= William Saroyan International Prize for Writing =

Literary award by Stanford University Libraries

The William Saroyan International Prize for Writing is a biennial literary award for fiction and nonfiction in the spirit of William Saroyan by emerging writers. It was established by Stanford University Libraries and the William Saroyan Foundation to "encourage new or emerging writers rather than recognize established literary figures;" the prize being $12,500.

The Saroyan Prize was first awarded in 2003 for "newly published works of fiction including novels, short stories, dramas or memoirs." Starting with the second round of awards in 2005, separate awards have been given for fiction and nonfiction. With the exception of a three-year gap between the second and third rounds of awards, the prize has been awarded every two years since it was established.

== Recipients ==
=== General (2003) ===
The first year the award was presented, winners and finalists not separated into genres.

Award winners and finalists
Year	Author	Title	Result	Ref.
2003	Jonathan Safran Foer	Everything is Illuminated	Winner	
2003	Hari Kunzru	The Impressionist	Finalist	
2003	Adam Rapp	Nocturne	Finalist	

=== Fiction (2005–present) ===
Fiction award winners, finalists, and shortlists
Year	Author	Title	Result	Ref.
2005	George Hagen	The Laments	Winner	
2005	Edward Docx	The Calligrapher	Finalist	
2005	Aris Janigian	Bloodvine	Finalist	
2005	Julie Orringer	How to Breathe Underwater	Finalist	
2005	Mark Arax and Rick Wartzman	The King of California	Winner	
2005	Tom Bissell	Chasing the Sea	Finalist	
2005	David Laskin	The Children's Blizzard	Finalist	
2008	Nicole Krauss	The History of Love	Winner	
2008	Pamela Erens	The Understory	Finalist	
2008	Richard Lange	Dead Boys	Finalist	
2010	Rivka Galchen	Atmospheric Disturbances	Winner	
2010	Elizabeth Kelly	apologize, apologize!	Finalist	
2010	Peter Neofotis	Concord, Virginia: A Southern Town in Eleven Stories	Finalist	
2012	Daniel Orozco	Orientation and Other Stories	Winner	
2012	Ben Lerner	Leaving the Atocha Station	Finalist	
2012	Miroslav Penkov	East of the West: A Country in Stories	Finalist	
2014	Kiese Laymon	Long Division	Winner	
2014	Eric Lundgren	The Facades	Finalist	
2014	Alexander Maksik	A Marker to Measure Drift	Finalist	
2016	T. Geronimo Johnson	Welcome to Braggsville	Winner	
2016	Amina Gautier	Now We Will Be Happy	Finalist	
2016	John Keene	Counternarratives	Finalist	
2018	Hernan Diaz	In the Distance	Winner	
2018	Scott Shibuya Brown	The Traders	Finalist	
2018	Shanthi Sekaran	Lucky Boy	Finalist	
2020	Nana Kwame Adjei-Brenyah	Friday Black	Winner	
2020	Ayesha Harruna Attah	The Hundred Wells of Salaga	Finalist	
2020	Helen DeWitt	Some Trick	Finalist	
2022	Claire Oshetsky	Chouette	Winner	
2022	Siamak Vossoughi	A Sense of the Whole	Finalist	
2022	Danielle Evans	The Office of Historical Corrections	Finalist	
2024	Lee Mirinae	8 Lives of a Century-Old Trickster	Winner	
2024	Meron Hadero	A Down Home Meal for These Difficult Times	Finalist	
2024	Kim Fu	Lesser Known Monsters of the 21st Century	Finalist	

=== Non-fiction (2005–present ===
Non-fiction award winners, finalists, and shortlists
Year	Author	Title	Result	Ref.
2005	Mark Arax and Rick Wartzman	The King of California	Winner	
2005	Tom Bissell	Chasing the Sea	Finalist	
2005	David Laskin	The Children's Blizzard	Finalist	
2008	Kiyo Sato	Dandelion Through the Crack: The Sato Family Quest for the American Dream	Winner	
2008	Adam David Miller	Ticket to Exile	Finalist	
2008	John Moir	Return of the Condor: The Race to Save Our Largest Bird from Extinction	Finalist	
2010	Linda Himelstein	The King of Vodka: The Story of Pyotr Sminov and the Upheaval of an Empire	Winner	
2010	Brian Brett	Trauma Farm	Finalist	
2010	Maryalice Huggins	Aesop's Mirror	Finalist	
2012	Elisabeth Tova Bailey	The Sound of a Wild Snail Eating	Winner	
2012	Arion Golmakani	Solacers	Finalist	
2012	John Jeremiah Sullivan	Pulphead	Finalist	
2014	Margalit Fox	The Riddle of the Labyrinth: The Quest to Crack an Ancient Code	Winner	
2014	Daniel James Brown	The Boys in the Boat: Nine Americans and their Epic Quest for Gold at the 1936 Berlin Olympics	Finalist	
2016	Lori Jakiela	Belief is its Own Kind of Truth, Maybe	Winner	
2016	Elena Gorokhova	Russian Tattoo	Finalist	
2016	Susan Southard	Nagasaki: Life After Nuclear War	Finalist	
2018	Robert Moor	On Trails: an Exploration	Winner	
2018	Angela Palm	Riverine: a Memoir from Anywhere but Here	Finalist	
2018	Edward Wilson-Lee	Shakespeare in Swahililand: Adventures with the Ever-living Poet	Finalist	
2020	Jennifer Croft	Homesick: A Memoir	Winner	
2020	Alexander Chee	How to Write an Autobiographical Novel: Essays	Finalist	
2020	Carmen Maria Machado	In the Dream House	Finalist	
2022	Wayétu Moore	The Dragons, the Giant, the Women	Winner	
2022	Shawna Kay	Kin	Finalist	
2024	Fae Myenne Ng	Orphan Bachelors	Winner	
2024	Phoebe Zerwick	Beyond Innocence: The Life Sentence of Darryl Hunt	Finalist	
2024	Susan Kiyo Ito	I Would Meet You Anywhere	Finalist	
