= Rilla Askew =

American novelist and short story writer (born 1951)

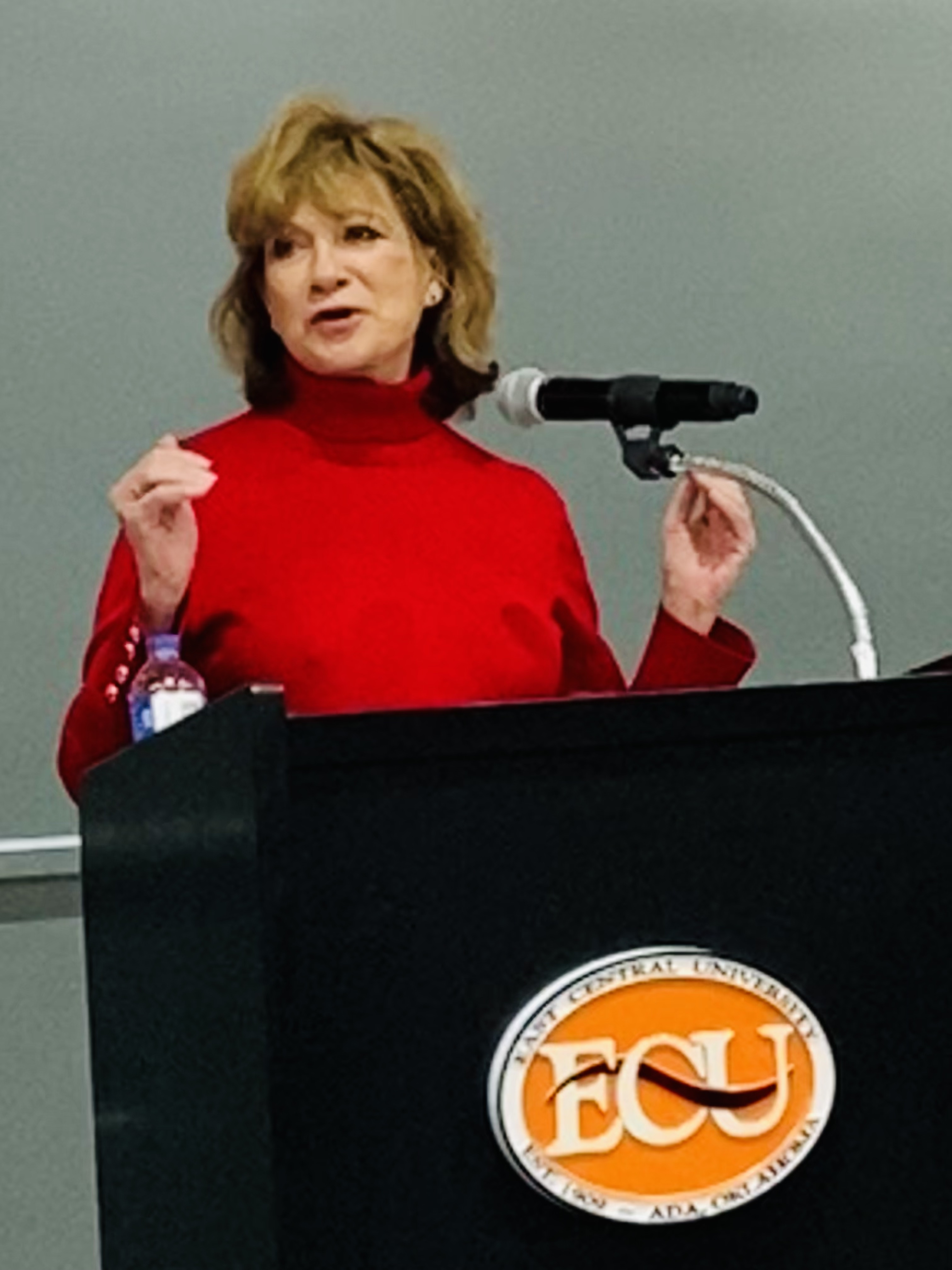
- Rilla Askew reads at the 2022 Scissortail Literary Festival at East Central University in Ada, Oklahoma
- Born: 1951 (age 74–75); Poteau, Oklahoma, U.S.
- Education: University of Tulsa (BFA); Brooklyn College (MFA)
- Occupation: Author
- Spouse: Paul Austin
- Writing career
- Genres: Fiction, nonfiction
- Website: www.rillaaskew.com

Rilla Askew (born 1951) is an American novelist and short story writer who was born in Poteau, in the Sans Bois Mountains of southeastern Oklahoma, and grew up in the town of Bartlesville, Oklahoma.

== Early life and education ==
Askew graduated from the University of Tulsa with a BFA in Theatre Performance in 1980. She moved then to New York where she studied acting at HB Studio with Herbert Bergoff in New York and later Curt Dempster at Ensemble Studio Theatre. She began writing—plays first, then fiction—with her theatre background supporting the use of language and rhythm in her works. She went on to study creative writing at Brooklyn College, where she received her MFA in 1989.

Rilla has taught in MFA writing programs at Syracuse University, Brooklyn College, the University of Arkansas, and the University of Massachusetts Amherst.

Askew is married to actor Paul Austin.

== Career ==
In 1989 Askew published her first short story "The Gift" in Nimrod's "Oklahoma Indian Markings" issue. Her essays and short fiction have appeared in Tin House, TriQuarterly, Nimrod, World Literature Today, and elsewhere. Her story "The Killing Blanket" was selected for the collection Prize Stories 1993: The O. Henry Awards (Anchor, 1993). Her first book of fiction, Strange Business, was published in 1992 by Viking Books.

Often capturing life in Oklahoma, Askew's work handles themes of place, outsiders, religion and politics, greed and ambition, race, and women's lives. In his citation for the American Academy of Arts and Letters, writer Allan Gurganus likens Askew's writing to a mythic cycle that unsettles popular notions of the settling of the American West Writer Patricia Eakins notes Askew's filiation with other American writers of the epic tradition, exploring tragedies of history and family and unforgiving landscapes, with comparisons to William Faulkner and Cormac McCarthy.

Inspired by her family history, Askew's first novel, The Mercy Seat (1997) follows two rival brothers, and transforms the family drama into the drama of a community. It was nominated for the PEN/Faulkner Award, the Dublin IMPAC Prize, was a Boston Globe Notable Book, and received the Oklahoma Book Award and the Western Heritage Award in 1998.

In 2002, her second novel Fire in Beulah (2001), about the Tulsa Race Massacre, received the American Book Award and the Gustavus Myers Outstanding Book Award from the Gustavus Myers Center for the Study of Bigotry and Human Rights. In this historical novel, as in her other works, some critics have discussed how Askew offers the strong presence and prominence to the Other as a corrective to a-historic and romanticized visions of the American southwest.

Askew's third novel, Harpsong (2007), is set in 1930's Oklahoma and concerns the dispossessed and homeless during the Dust Bowl era. Harpsong received the Oklahoma Book Award, the Western Heritage Award, the WILLA Award from Women Writing the West, and the Violet Crown Award from the Writers League of Texas in 2008. Poet Mary Green described it as "a love song to the American voice and the American perspective...about the love that is involved—with all the accompanying stark failings and supreme acts of kindness—in being fully human."

Her fourth novel, Kind of Kin (2013), is set in Cedar, Oklahoma and focuses on state immigration laws, race, religion, and class. Published by Ecco, Kind of Kin was a finalist for the 2014 Western Spur Award, the Mountains and Plains Booksellers Award in 2013, and was long-listed for the 2015 Dublin IMPAC Prize.

Askew's 2017 collection of creative nonfiction Most American: Notes from a Wounded Place, which reckons with truths obscured by collective memory, was long-listed for the PEN/America Diamonstein-Spielvogel Art of the Essay Award in 2018.

Her novel Prize for the Fire, published by the University of Oklahoma Press in October 2022, follows the 16th century Protestant martyr Anne Askew, one of the first women writers in the English language. Author Pamela Erens calls it "a deeply sensitive and ambitious act of historical imagination," noting that "the struggles of this sixteenth-century protagonist echo in our own contemporary battles over women's voices and bodily autonomy."

A new collection of stories, The Hungry & The Haunted, is forthcoming from Belle Point Press in September 2024.

She teaches creative writing at the University of Oklahoma.

== Awards and recognition ==
In 2009, she received an Arts and Letters Award from the American Academy of Arts and Letters.

In 2003, she was inducted into the Oklahoma Writers Hall of Fame. Askew was a 2004 fellow at Civitella Ranieri Foundation in Umbertide, Italy, and a featured writer at the 2008 World Literature Today and Chinese Literature Conference in Beijing. She served as a juror for the 2008 Neustadt Prize for Literature.

Askew received the 2011 Arrell Gibson Lifetime Achievement Award from the Oklahoma Center for the Book.

Fire in Beulah was selected as the 2007 Oklahoma Reads Oklahoma book.

=== Awards ===
- Oklahoma Book Award Finalist – 2023 – Prize for the Fire
- PEN/America Diamonstein-Spielvogel Award Art of the Essay Semifinalist – 2018 – Most American
- Dublin IMPAC Prize Longlist – 2014 – Kind of Kin
- Spur Award Finalist – 2014 – Kind of Kin
- Oklahoma Book Award Finalist – 2014 – Kind of Kin
- Women Writing the West WILLA Award – 2008 – Harpsong
- Violet Crown Award – 2008 – Harpsong
- Western Heritage Award – 2008 – Harpsong
- Oklahoma Book Award – 2008 – Harpsong
- American Book Award – 2002 – Fire in Beulah
- Myers Book Award – 2002 – Fire in Beulah
- PEN/Faulkner Finalist – 1998 – The Mercy Seat
- Western Heritage Award – 1998 – The Mercy Seat
- Oklahoma Book Award – 1998 – The Mercy Seat
- Oklahoma Book Award – 1993 – Strange Business
- Barnes and Noble Discover Great New Writers – 1992 – Strange Business

== Bibliography ==
=== Books ===
- The Hungry & The Haunted (Belle Point Press, 2024)
- Prize for the Fire (University of Oklahoma Press, 2022)
- Most American: Notes from a Wounded Place (University of Oklahoma Press, 2017)
- Kind of Kin (Ecco Press US, 2013), (Atlantic Press UK, 2013)
- Harpsong (University of Oklahoma Press, 2007)
- Fire in Beulah (Viking, 2001; Penguin, 2001)
- The Mercy Seat (Viking, 1998; Penguin, 1998)
- Strange Business (Viking, 1992; Penguin, 1992)

=== Selected essays ===
- AGNI "Dear Tulsa" 2019
- Pacific Standard "Postcards from America" 2018
- Great Plains Quarterly "Epicenter: Deep Mapping Place in Fiction and Nonfiction" 2017
- Flock "Snake Season" 2017
- Green Country "A Sense of Place" 2016
- This Land "Home Territory" 2016
- This Land "Trail" 2015
- Longreads "The Cost" 2015
- This Land "Near McAlester" 2014
- Tri-Quarterly "The Tornado That Hit Boggy" 2014
- The Daily Beast "The Cost: What Stop and Frisk Does to a Young Man's Soul" 2014
- Tin House "Rhumba" 2013
- London Daily Telegraph "Growing Up in Tornado Alley" 2013
- Transatlantica "Race and Redemption in the American Heartland" 2012
- Arcadia "Crime and Innocence" 2010
- World Literature Today "Passing: The Writer's Skin and the Authentic Self" 2009
- Nimrod "Most American" 2006
