= Lucky Boy (novel) =

2017 novel written by Shanthi Sekaran

- First edition
- Author: Shanthi Sekaran
- Language: English
- Genre: Fiction
- Publisher: Putnam
- Publication date: 2017
- Publication place: United States
- Pages: 472 pp
- ISBN: 978-1-101-98224-2

Lucky Boy is the second novel written by American novelist Shanthi Sekaran published in 2017.

== Plot ==
Soli, an eighteen-year-old woman, enters the United States illegally from Mexico, and an Indian American woman named Kavya struggles to have a baby with her husband, who works in Silicon Valley. The two stories converge around a baby, the "lucky boy".

== Reception ==
Steph Cha of USA Today wrote, "It’s easy to imagine the lives of these characters even off the page. Lucky Boy pulses with vitality, pumped with the life breath of human sin and love."

Kathleen Rooney of the Chicago Tribune said: "In her sweeping, deep and strikingly compassionate second novel, 'Lucky Boy,' Shanthi Sekaran weaves these two elemental narratives with emotionally arresting aplomb."

In 2018, Lucky Boy was a finalist for the William Saroyan International Prize for Writing and was longlisted for the Aspen Words Literary Prize.

== Television series ==
A television series based on Lucky Boy is being developed by UnbeliEVAble Entertainment, starring Eva Longoria and David Schulner.
