= Claire Oshetsky =

American novelist

Claire Oshetsky is an American novelist and a former science journalist. Their first novel Chouette was longlisted for the 2022 PEN/Faulkner Award for Fiction, and won the William Saroyan International Prize for Writing. Their sophomore novel, Poor Deer, won the 2024 Janet Heidinger Kafka Prize and the audiobook was a finalist for Audie Award for Audiobook of the Year. Their third novel, Evil Genius, was published in February 2026.

Oshetsky uses they/them pronouns.

== Works ==
- Oshetsky, Claire (2021). Chouette. New York: Ecco. ISBN 978-0-06-306667-0.
- Oshetsky, Claire (2024-01-09). Poor Deer. New York, NY: Ecco. ISBN 978-0-06-332766-5. OCLC 1416642787.
- Oshetsky, Claire (2026). Evil Genius. New York: Ecco. ISBN 978-0063466487.
- Benobi, Lark (2018). The Book of Dog. Vegetablian Books. ISBN 978-0-9996546-1-3.
