= Shanthi Sekaran =

Indian American educator and novelist (born 1977)

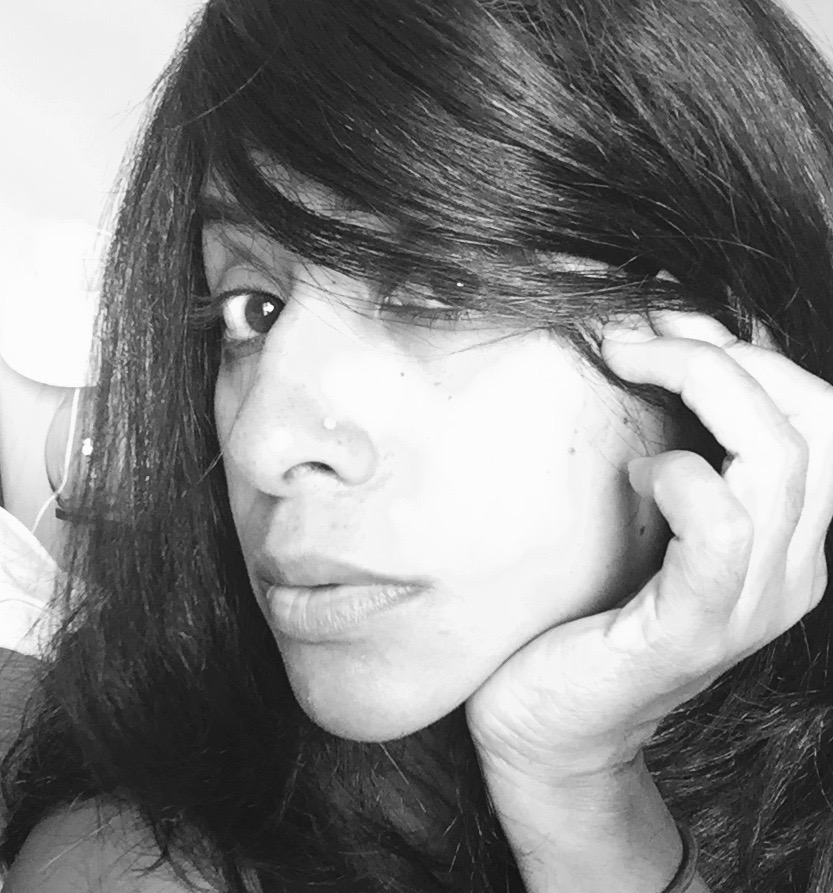
- Born: 1977 (age 48–49); United States
- Education: UC Berkeley
- Occupations: Novelist, teacher
- Writing career
- Language: English
- Genre: Fiction
- Website: shanthisekaran.com

Shanthi Sekaran is an Indian American educator and novelist known for The Prayer Room and Lucky Boy.

== Education ==
She received a Master of Arts for South Asian Studies from UC Berkeley in 2001 and in Creative Writing Fiction from Johns Hopkins University in 2003.

Doctor of Philosophy University of Newcastle (UK) 2011, two part doctoral thesis including: "Salt of Another Earth: A Critical Study of Food" and "Culinary Practice in Indian-American Narratives of the Immigrant Experience".

== Career ==
Sekaran is an adjunct professor at the California College of the Arts and St. Mary's College of California, where she teaches creative writing.

Published in 2017, Lucky Boy was named a Best Book of 2017 by NPR, Barnes and Noble, Library Journal and The San Francisco Chronicle. It was long-listed for the Aspen Literary Prize, The Northern California Book Award, and The Morning News Rooster, and is currently shortlisted for the 2018 Chattaqua Prize.

Lucky Boy was initially optioned by Eva Longoria, David Schulner and Ben Spector for television development. The rights to Lucky Boy are up for option again.

Sekaran has written about her experiences as the child of immigrants growing up in California. She explores, through fictional approaches, the disparities in how different categories of immigrants are treated in the US. She also writes about motherhood, politics.

== Awards and honors ==
Shanthi Sekaran's novel Lucky Boy became a finalist of William Saroyan International Prize for Writing in 2018.

== Biblio ==
- The Prayer Room
- Lucky Boy (2017)
- "The Samosa Rebellion"
