= The Indifferent Stars Above =

2009 nonfiction book by Daniel James Brown

The Indifferent Stars Above: The Harrowing Saga of a Donner Party Bride
- Author: Daniel James Brown
- Language: English
- Genre: Nonfiction
- Publisher: William Morrow
- Publication date: 2009
- Publication place: United States
- Pages: 352
- ISBN: 9780061348105

The Indifferent Stars Above: The Harrowing Saga of a Donner Party Bride (William Morrow, 2009) is a nonfiction book written by Daniel James Brown. It traces the footsteps of Sarah Graves, a young bride who left her home in Illinois in the spring of 1846, bound for California. Sarah was one of a handful of the ill-fated Donner Party members who attempted to hike out of the Sierra Nevada to save herself and her family.

== Reviews ==
- The New York Times
- Kirkus Reviews
- Seattle Times
