= Harpsong =

2007 novel by Rilla Askew

- First edition
- Author: Rilla Askew
- Language: English
- Series: Oklahoma Stories and Storytellers
- Genre: Novel
- Publisher: University of Oklahoma Press
- Publication date: 2007
- Publication place: United States
- Media type: Print (hardback)
- Pages: 245 pp
- ISBN: 978-0-8061-3823-7
- OCLC: 71241966
- Dewey Decimal: 813/.54 22
- LC Class: PS3551.S545 H37 2007
- Preceded by: Fire in Beulah

Harpsong is a novel by Rilla Askew published in 2007. It is volume one in Oklahoma Stories and Storytellers, from University of Oklahoma Press.

Harpsong received the Oklahoma Book Award, the Western Heritage Award, the WILLA Literary Award from Women Writing the West, and the Violet Crown Award from the Writers' League of Texas in 2008.

Harpsong tells the story of Harlan Singer and his teenage wife Sharon, on the road in the midwest during the Great Depression.
