= The Hunters (novel) =

Novel by James Salter

- First edition
- Author: James Salter
- Language: English
- Genre: War novel
- Publisher: Harper & Brothers
- Publication date: 1956 (1st edition); 1997 (revised re-issue)
- Publication place: United States
- Media type: Print (hardback & paperback)
- Pages: 233
- ISBN: 0-375-70392-6 (1999 printing)
- OCLC: 40521311
- Dewey Decimal: 813/.54 21
- LC Class: PS3569.A4622 H86 1999
- Followed by: The Arm of Flesh (1961)

The Hunters is James Salter's debut novel and a tale of USAF fighter pilots during the Korean War, first published in 1956. The novel was the basis for the 1958 film adaptation of the novel starring Robert Mitchum and Robert Wagner with a different storyline.

Under his birthname James A. Horowitz, Salter himself was a fighter pilot with the rank of captain who saw combat from February to August 1952. He kept a detailed diary of his tour and the novel closely follows a chronology of events he experienced as an F-86 Sabre pilot with the 4th Fighter-Interceptor Wing, based at Kimpo Air Base, Korea.

Salter was 31 when he published the novel and made his protagonist the same age. He describes 31 as being "the end for him" as a fighter pilot: "...not too old, certainly; but it would not be long. His eyes weren't good enough any more. With an athlete, the legs failed first. With a fighter pilot, it was the eyes." Salter resigned from the Air Force soon after the publication of The Hunters to pursue an alternate passion, writing.

== Plot summary ==
=== New to war ===
On a frozen February evening in Fuchū, Japan, Captain Cleve Connell (Captain Cleve Saville in the original edition) restlessly waits for assignment orders completing his transfer to Korea. Billeted for four days in a warehouse, he has tired of seeing Tokyo – and of watching others come and go – and his clean laundry is nearly gone. He walks to dinner at the Officers Club reflecting on his ability as a flyer (he is a good one, with a reputation among his peacetime peers), his reluctance to leave the Air Force although pressured by civilian friends to do so, and his desire to test himself in combat. He senses that his feelings of time lost and lack of accomplishment are corrosive.

He shares dinner with a fellow pilot en route to the war and while they are discussing women, the war in general, and the tedium of waiting, a group of loud young lieutenants enters the club. One stands out from the rest, however, emanating cool confidence amidst their obvious insecurity, and mildly harasses a pretty Japanese bar waitress. Cleve's companion chastises the lieutenant, who reluctantly backs down, resisting just enough that Cleve catches his name in the discussion: Pell. Cleve shrugs aside the episode and the next morning receives his orders.

He arrives in Korea on a frigid afternoon and despite a feeling of exhilaration, his first impression of Korea is of a dreary, impoverished country made drearier by the slow-moving military bureaucracy. Assigned to an elite fighter wing at the primitive Kimpo air base, Cleve arrives to find it abuzz with an outgoing mission and talk of a bad end to a bad week: the leading ace in the wing has just been shot down and killed. (Note: The allusion is to the death of Major George A. Davis, Jr., who was killed in action soon after Salter arrived at Kimpo.) He meets pilots he knew in Panama, just after the end of World War II, including Carl Abbott, now a major. Cleve is mildly shocked to find that his young comrade of just a few years ago now looks old, out of shape, and lacking in spirit. Though genuinely glad to see Cleve, Major Abbott's effectiveness as a combat pilot is gone; he has been put out to pasture and does not care.

That evening, in the officers club, he greets his wing commander, Colonel Imil, a former squadron commander in Panama. Imil is a larger-than-life personality who shows off Cleve to the veterans as a "real fighter pilot", and enthusiastically introduces him to Colonel Moncavage, a former ace just returned to flying. Moncavage's cool response prompts Imil to goad him, revealing a competitive friction between the two commanders.

=== Erosion of confidence ===
Cleve is put through a brief period of training. One morning, he goes to the operations office to follow the progress of a mission over the radio. The operations officer is Desmond, another old friend. In their discussion, he learns that Desmond also feels that Abbott "doesn't have it any more" and the conversation turns to the quality of their MiG opponents. While nearly all are poor adversaries, a few are very good, particularly one nicknamed Casey Jones, the only MiG pilot to best Imil in a fight. Desmond reassures him that Casey Jones' distinctively black-striped MiG isn't seen on missions anymore, his tour apparently over.

Cleve begins flying missions as Desmond's wingman. They encounter MiGs in large numbers on one mission and although seemingly everywhere, the clashes are so fleeting that Desmond's flight is unable to ever catch up to any. Cleve has a feeling afterwards that perhaps his flight was "playing it safe" and makes the mistake of saying so to Desmond, offending him. At the post-mission debriefing, they learn that a pilot, Robey, has claimed his fifth MiG. Another pilot asks Desmond, "Did he really get this one for a change?", prompting Desmond to relate to Cleve that Robey had once gotten Imil to cajole a reluctant wingman into confirming a kill he had not witnessed. Even so, Cleve notices that news of the fifth kill gets around quickly, and that he, like everyone else, feels a "mystic fulfillment" at being a part of the same fight.

Imil makes Cleve a flight leader despite his having flown just eight missions. The flight consists of two veteran pilots, DeLeo and Daughters, and two untried replacements, Billy Hunter and Pettibone. All are aware of his reputation as a flyer and accordingly respectful, but it becomes apparent that he has been made flight lead because the flight has yet to shoot down any MiGs. Though nothing goes wrong in their first mission together, he is left with the strong feeling of a "wasted mission", until he learns that nobody in the wing saw any MiGs. Just as he is about to recover his good humor however, he encounters a new pilot in their barracks just assigned to his flight, Ed Pell, the loud lieutenant from Japan. Cleve is acutely disquieted. Pell upsets the balance of things; Cleve becomes uncomfortably aware that he is the leader, and much is expected of him.

A quarter of the way through his tour, he has yet to engage in combat, and on days when the wing is in a fight, Imil chides him for missing it. Trapped by a feeling of helplessness, his growing self-doubt begins to gnaw away his confidence as he fears he is not just unlucky but possibly lacking something vital. The feeling worsens when Major Abbott, about to be exiled from the Wing, drops in to say goodbye and begins sobbing uncontrollably, possibly foreshadowing Cleve's own fate. Other missions go by without combat until one day Colonel Moncavage, who also had lacked success, shoots down two MiGs, eviscerating Cleve emotionally.

=== Redemption and leave ===
The bad feelings vanish when Cleve, with Billy Hunter on his wing, shoots down a MiG. Both exultant and relieved, he learns at debriefing that Pell, too, has shot down a MiG and almost gotten DeLeo killed in the process: DeLeo accuses Pell of flying off on his own in the middle of the fight and leaving his leader to the mercies of the enemy. Pell denies the accusation and Cleve tries to smooth over the situation as a misunderstanding in the heat of battle. He discovers that his redemption is short-lived when, five days later, a big fight occurs after Cleve left himself off the schedule. The doubt and ominous fear return immediately. Then he finds that Pell has shot down another MiG. DeLeo remains hostile and skeptical of Pell, but Daughters confirms the kill.

The arrival of spring brings a long spell of bad weather that shuts down almost all combat missions. Cleve and DeLeo decide to go on leave to Japan "to enjoy civilization". The night before the leave they head into Seoul for a steak dinner at the plush officers club of Air Force Headquarters, where they run into Abbott who insists with a pitiful obsessiveness on hearing the details of Cleve's MiG kill. Cleve realizes that the other pilots hated Abbott because they saw themselves in him.

Reaching Tokyo, their leave starts as a typical R&R with martinis and steak for breakfast, followed by an afternoon nap, then an evening of hopping from cocktail lounge to cocktail lounge. DeLeo disappears to make a phone call and while he's gone the fragrance of perfume from a passing woman makes Cleve realize that he has suppressed all physical desires. DeLeo has booked them a night at Miyoshi's, a well-known Soapland-style brothel, that is spent in samisen music, saki, the baths, and sex with two young Japanese women. Cleve waxes philosophically about such luxury in contrast to their spartan existence in Korea, and DeLeo warns him that while "trying" (to get MiGs) is enough for DeLeo, he knows it won't be enough for Cleve.

The next night while making the rounds of the clubs, they run into a former friend of Pell's during cadet training, an obvious admirer whose drunken praise confirms all of Cleve's misgivings about Pell's deviousness and ambition, and he knows he has entered "a dark, ultimate battle." The next day, as a favor to his father, he searches for and finds Miyata, a Japanese artist, whose brother was a friend. Despite losing his life's work in the fire raids, Miyata is not only not bitter but seems above the miseries involved in living. They find a common interest in films and Miyata introduces Cleve to his daughter Eiko.

He spends the next day with Eiko. She draws him out, asking him about his ambition. He replies that he has chased many ambitions of his own choosing but now has had one forced on him: to become an ace. He explains that he knows it is the result of a fatal pride but that flying fighters becomes first a sport and then a refuge. Finally he tells her that he wants to be remembered for something, a real performance akin to her aspiration to act in a great movie, and that in the final analysis his ambition is "Not to fail." Beyond that, he has no answers. With two days of his leave remaining, they make plans for the next day.

Back at his hotel, he hears important news. There was a big fight the day before over the Yalu River, with eight MiGs shot down and three pilots lost, including Desmond. He feels sickened and helpless having missed it again, but there is more: Casey Jones is back. DeLeo tries to talk him out of it, but Cleve immediately goes back to Korea, followed by his reluctant, disgusted wingman.

=== Challenged ===
Cleve returns to Kimpo before dawn and puts his flight on the morning mission. In the locker room after the briefing, he is surly with Pell, who is not only cocky but full of suggestions on how the mission ought to be flown and somewhat contemptuous of its veteran pilots. In an ensuing dogfight, Cleve gets on the tail of a MiG, cripples it, and just as he is about to make the kill has to break off to rescue Pell, who mysteriously fell behind and is under attack by two other MiGs. One of the attacking MiGs spins out of control and crashes. Pell claims it as a kill. Pell has Imil's ear now, and despite the fact that his kill was confirmed only because of Cleve's corroboration, suggests that Cleve lacks the stomach for combat and leaves hanging in the air his belief that he (Pell) ought to be leading the flight. Later, he insinuates the same to Cleve and taunts him when rebuked.

Behind his back, Pell undercuts Cleve with the other rookies of the flight. His resentment of Pell blinds Cleve to Pell's intentions when Daughters tries to support him, plus he is distracted by all the talk regarding Casey Jones. He wants to be free of competing for MiGs but he's only too aware that he's expected by everyone, even Daughters and DeLeo, to match Pell's accomplishments. Cleve's flight is scheduled for three missions the next day, a reconnaissance and two MiG sweeps. He assigns himself to the sweeps and puts Daughters, with Pell as wingman, on the early morning reconnaissance, where nothing is likely to happen.

To his anguish, the recon flight is jumped by six MiGs and shoots down two. Worse, only three ships of the flight return. They ran into Casey Jones, DeLeo says, who had him cold a dozen times but never fired. Daughters — with only a handful of missions to go — was shot down in flames. Pell got both MiGs and DeLeo accuses him of failing to do his assigned job: warning Daughters that MiGs were behind him. Pell protests his innocence, but when Cleve tells him he's going to ground him for abandoning his leader, Pell just smirks confidently. Imil, caring only about MiG kills, supports Pell and angrily accuses Cleve of trying to wreck the outfit, insinuates that he's shirking combat, and says that he "and that Italian...have got it in for Pell". Cleve realizes he's lost Imil's support. Imil lionizes Pell, and when the new ace tries to ease his conscience with rationalizations of how Daughters might have gotten himself killed, Imil refuses even to listen.

Pell is sent to Japan as a reward for making ace and, curiously, asks that Hunter and Pettibone accompany him. No one except Cleve realizes (or cares) that Pell is making them acolytes to undermine Cleve's authority. Cleve imagines Daughters' terror at being shot down, and in the realization of his own mortality, comes to believe that his salvation will be in killing Casey Jones. When Pell returns, now a celebrity, he holds court for the other pilots, using Hunter as his Boswell. Cleve comes to hate Pell in a way that seems to wipe out everything else from his life, and when Imil admits he was wrong and tries to apologize, Cleve doesn't back down from his desire to ground Pell, angering the colonel even more. DeLeo finishes his tour; two new pilots join the flight and immediately become Pell's disciples. Hunter, who has ambitions of his own, remains loyal to Cleve, but clearly admires Pell.

=== The Hunters ===
In June, when Cleve has only six missions remaining, the entire group is briefed for an anticipated huge air battle. A major attack on a North Korean dam has been ordered and hundreds of MiGs are expected to defend it. Every plane in the group is sent, but Cleve is put in the last flight, with Hunter as his wingman. Large numbers of MiGs react, yet the strike is unopposed. Cleve and Hunter, the last in the area, almost stay too long trying to make contact and start back low on fuel. Cleve spots four MiGs and heedless of his fuel state turns toward them. Unexpectedly four more appear above them and break into pairs; Hunter reports that the leader has black stripes.

The MiGs try to corner them, but Cleve is determined to take the fight as far south as he can, in case the MiGs are also low on fuel. In their twisting, evasive turns they get off some bursts, descend to an altitude where their jets perform better, and the MiGs lose their advantage. Cleve seizes an opportunity and closes in behind Casey Jones. The fight becomes a battle of wills and descends near the ground, where Casey tries an impossible diving maneuver. Cleve somehow follows him through it and shoots him down.

Their fuel tanks nearly empty, Cleve and Hunter climb to 40,000 feet to attempt to glide back to base, a too-common practice. He notifies Kimpo about their dire situation. Imil asks if they got any MiGs. Cleve tells him "they" got one. Out of fuel and without power, they try to land. Cleve makes it, but the less experienced Hunter stalls and crashes just short of the field.

Imil wants to know about the kill; Cleve is intoxicated, knowing it was Casey Jones. Then he learns Hunter was killed in the crash and that his own gun camera failed to function. Imil laments there is no way to confirm the kill. Cleve tells him it doesn't matter; it was Casey Jones. Pell objects strenuously that there is no way to confirm the kill. Imil, who has proclaimed that no one less skilled than himself could ever get Casey, quickly agrees with Pell.

Cleve responds in a way he had never conceived possible, and finds his destiny. "I can confirm it," he declares suddenly, "Hunter got him."

Two missions later Pettibone loses sight of Cleve, who does not return to base. Pell, back after his seventh kill, tells a correspondent interviewing him that Cleve was one of the best, who taught him everything about air combat, but never got lucky himself. Cleve was like his brother. "But don't write any of that," he says.

== Characters ==
- Captain Cleve Connell (Saville in the original printing) – a career pilot, embarking on his first tour of combat duty after 7 years in the Air Force
- Cleve's flight members:
  - Bert DeLeo – a career pilot from West Virginia in his late twenties
  - Jim Daughters – a married reserve pilot and World War II veteran, once a high school coach, has the most missions
  - Billy Hunter – brand-new, an artless Texas boy, but a capable flyer
  - Pettibone – a new lieutenant, and a poor pilot
  - Ed Pell – newly assigned, Pell calls himself "Doctor" and quickly shows a penchant for MiG-killing
- Colonel Dutch Imil – Cleve's wing commander, a World War II ace and hero
- Major Carl Abbott – a career pilot, World War II ace and former squadron mate
- Robey – a patronizing, newly minted ace in Connell's squadron
- Colonel Monk Moncavage – Group commander and second-in-command of the wing, newly returned to flying from a staff position
- Desmond – Connell's squadron operations officer
- Guthrie – a pilot from another squadron
- Miyata – a Japanese artist in his late 40es
- Eiko – Miyata's 19-year-old daughter and an aspiring actress
- Casey Jones – a legendary, much-feared MiG pilot whose aircraft is marked by five diagonal black stripes

Note: these are the character names in the 1990s re-issue printings. Several names were changed from those used in the original edition.

== Style and theme ==
Salter has been praised for his descriptions of flight in this novel, including comparisons to Antoine de Saint-Exupéry (New York Times Book Review), but until the next-to-last chapter, scenes involving flying are few and brief. Most of the progress of the narrative takes place in dialogue or in Cleve's impressions, where the journey is more through his soul than the combat missions. Salter's prose has been characterized as "spare... but also lush", and relies heavily on simile in descriptions of surroundings and impressions.

He occasionally employs the patois of the air war in Korea to give the flavor of the experience, but does not use technical jargon at all. In the entire text neither the designation "F-86" nor the nickname Sabre are ever mentioned, the slang term "ships" used instead, and only once is "MiG" expanded to be "MiG 15" and that in a character's dialogue. In all flying scenes, the point of view is that of the pilots, not the airplanes, using the nominative pronoun "they".

Salter's biographer William Dowie calls The Hunters a "variation on the theme of man's desire for glory in the face of death." In giving the MiG kill, which is his finding of glory, to Billy Hunter, Cleve transcends his own ambitions and finds instead something more "authentic": leadership, the part of himself he had feared was lacking."

Dowie also notes that the protagonist of The Hunters was originally called "Cleve Saville," as is the main character of the film adaptation. When interest in Salter's earliest novels, unavailable for decades, resulted in a 1997 re-issue of the novel, Salter made several revisions, the main of which is changing Cleve's surname to "Connell" with no indication why this was done.

== Background and controversy ==
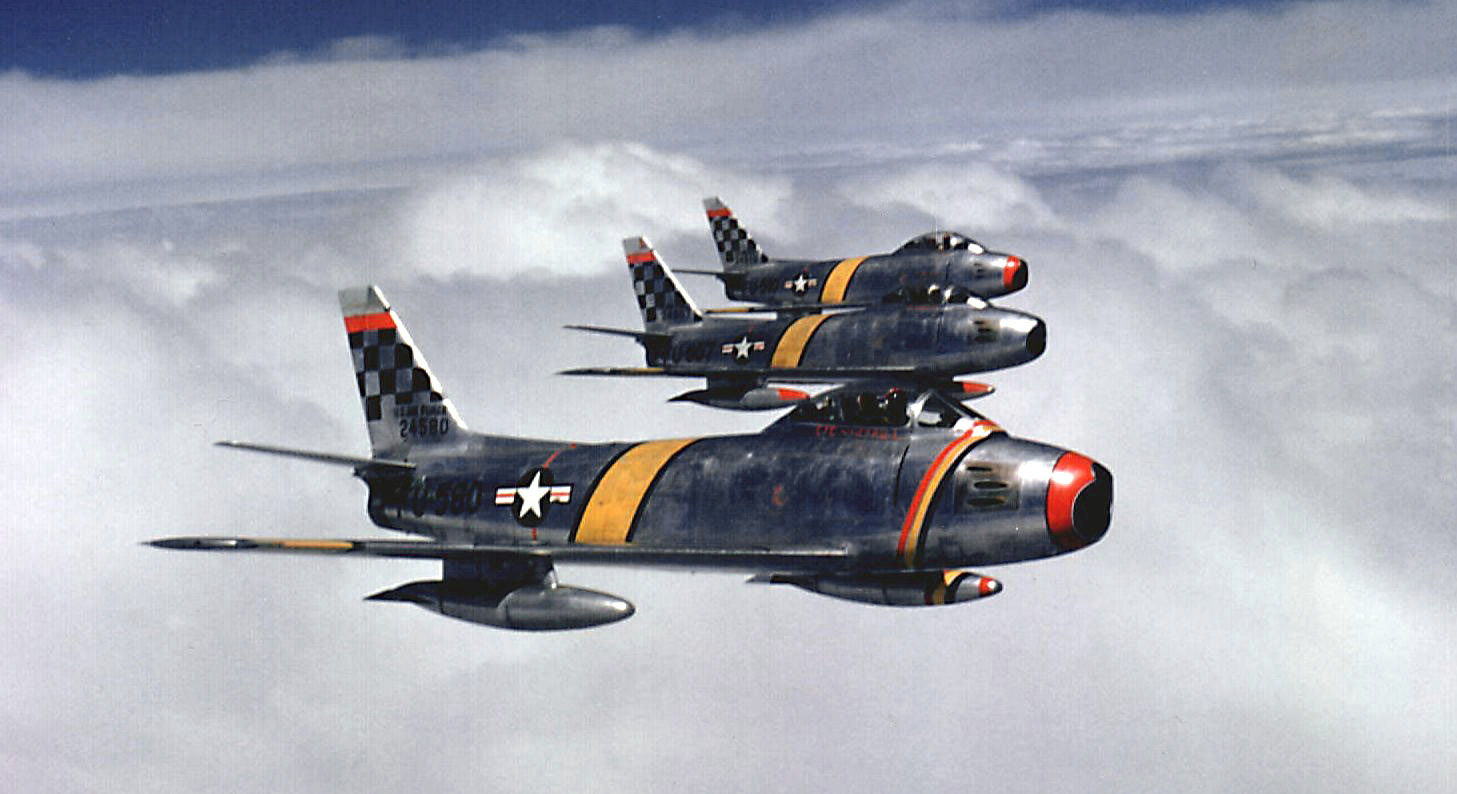
F-86s flying in formation over Korea

As with many works based on personal and historical experience, interest has fostered speculation about real-life personalities providing the basis for characters. Salter as James Horowitz had been assigned to D Flight in the 335th Fighter-Interceptor Squadron, which became one of the leading MiG-killing units in Korea while he was a member, scoring 28 victories. As described in the novel, Salter joined his flight before its members had registered any MiG claims but unlike the novel, flew as a wingman and not as leader until nearly the end of his tour. He acted as flight lead on July 4, 1952, however, his 89th mission, when he achieved his sole MiG kill. (Note: Horowitz's MiG was one of thirteen shot down that day by his group, flying cover for an attack by F-84s against the North Korean Military Academy at Sakchu, acknowledged even by the Soviets as one of Fifth Air Force's more spectacular achievements. (Seidov and Britton, p. 391)) This occurred ten days after the attack on the Sui-ho Dam which provided the framework for the climax of The Hunters, although in the historical mission no MiG combat actually took place.

Three of the eight pilots with whom Salter flew became aces, (Note: The other two were Capt. Robert J. Love and 1st Lt. James H. Kasler) including 2nd Lt. James F. Low. He joined D Flight in April, about eight weeks following Salter, after the flight's pilots had begun racking up scores. The flight leader, Captain Philip E. "Casey" Colman, (Note: Colman was a reservist and World War II ace recently recalled to active duty. His nickname came about when he ran out of fuel during his checkout flight in the F-86 and landed gear-up on a narrow gauge Korean railroad track. The name "Casey Jones" was obviously much on the minds of the pilots at the time.) had a unique policy that allowed anyone in the flight to shoot MiGs, rather than only flight and element leads as was the common practice. Low appears to have taken advantage of that policy to his own aggrandizement.

Almost from the beginning Low garnered a persistent reputation for breaking away from his formation to pursue MiGs; his element lead, future ace James H. Kasler, was nearly shot down when Low broke away during a dogfight to shoot down his first MiG. However, just as depicted in The Hunters, the 4th Wing's commander Colonel Harrison Thyng "went to bat for him" because he wanted results: MiG kills. Within a month Low had scored his fifth kill, the only second lieutenant in Korea to become an ace. A month after that, following his sixth kill, (Note: Ironically, Low achieved this victory while flying as element lead in the flight led by Horowitz on July 4 in which he got his only kill.) Low was sent back to the United States on temporary duty to lecture on the radar gunsight, of which he was undoubtedly an expert. When he returned to Korea in October he found himself something of a pariah among the new leadership in the 4th Wing. He shot down three more MiGs in Korea, then was sent home, and some pilots alleged it was for losing his wingman.

When Salter wrote The Hunters, his use of Low as a model for Ed Pell was obvious, starting with the nickname "Doc" standing in for the self-ascribed moniker "Dad" used by Low. Controversy over the depiction remained subdued until release of the film, which transformed Pell's character into an immature but likeable pilot who redeems himself after his element lead is shot down while he was off chasing a MiG. F-86 aficionados sought to get the "whole story" and interviewed Low, who then got in his own shots. Low disparaged Salter as a poor fighter pilot, a "Hudson High boy" (West Point graduate) who had an aversion to combat and implied that Salter's dislike of him was his actual motivation for the Pell character. Whether consciously or not, this rebuttal mirrored the scene in the novel in which Pell disparaged Cleve to Imil: "I don't think he goes for this combat flying too much." (Note: Low experienced a very checkered career in the Air Force. He was Salter's peer in age, both having been born in 1925, but his inferior in rank. He had served in the Navy as an enlisted man during World War II. After his tour in Korea, Low was featured in a piece in Time magazine (January 5, 1953) in which he saw himself a "failure and a misfit" before becoming an ace, having spent the immediate post-war years as a professional gambler and failing in that. Low continued in the Air Force after Korea, eventually promoted to major and assigned to the 555th Tactical Fighter Squadron during the Vietnam War as an F-4D Phantom aircraft commander. In an irony that Cleve Saville might have found fitting, Low was shot down over North Vietnam by a MiG-21 on December 16, 1967, and made a prisoner of war. Low's status and celebrity were not noted in the press at the time, unlike the captures of his former flight mate Kasler (shot down in 1966 while trying to protect a downed wingman) and fellow 4th Wing jet ace Robinson Risner, both of whom were repeatedly and severely tortured. Low took great pains to conceal that he was also an ace. He spent only seven months as a POW and was offered an early release in July 1968 by his captors for propaganda value, making widely quoted statements praising his treatment as a POW and condemning United States participation in the war. For this Low was viewed by many of his fellow POWs as having broken faith with them (James Stockdale deemed it the "fink release program")—a violation of the Code of Conduct—and by extension, having once again abandoned his wingmen. In contrast, his back-seat pilot at the time of their capture, 1st Lt. Howard J. Hill, a 1965 Air Force Academy graduate, remained a prisoner until 1973 when other POWs were released.)

The character of Dutch Imil is more difficult to pigeonhole, and like many fictional characters with real-life counterparts, apparently a composite. While Thyng was superficially similar to Imil in combat experience, and the tone of Salter's recollections in Gods of Tin and Burning the Days indicates at least an ambivalence of feeling toward Thyng, Salter flew many of his missions with the wing commander and clearly respected him. Moreover, Thyng was a small man physically (Salter says he "looked like a fading jockey"), and not given to bombast. Descriptively, Imil was based largely on Major Zane S. Amell, commander of the 335th FIS when Salter arrived in Korea, with whom Salter flew his first missions and who accompanied Salter to Japan on leave in April in a manner similar to DeLeo. In addition to the similarity of their names, Amell/Imil share identical physical and personality characteristics in Salter's writings. Like Cleve Saville, Amell did not "make a great mark as a (combat) pilot" (Note: Amell did, however, achieve three MiG kills in early 1952.) but was well-liked and respected by his subordinates.

The largely sympathetic character of Monk Moncavage is superficially based on Col. Walker "Bud" Mahurin, a noted World War II ace who like Moncavage took over the job of group commander about the time of Salter's arrival in Korea. Like Moncavage he had no kills in the 4th FIW, and had recently transitioned into jet fighters after several years of staff work, but unlike Moncavage he had been transferred from the other F-86 wing, where he had shot down 3 MiGs. Salter liked Mahurin and regularly mentioned him in his reminiscences.

The communist ace Casey Jones (Note: The nickname arose because MiG formations were known as "bandit trains" and American radar controllers warned F-86s of their presence by stating that "the train has left the station." (Werrell, p. 292, note 75)) was an "urban legend" that sprang up among U.S. pilots in Korea: "an exceptional non-Asian pilot, perhaps a former Luftwaffe pilot, who attacked lone F-86s in a MiG painted with... fuselage stripes". A pair of top-scoring Soviet Air Force pilots, Nikolay Sutyagin and Yevgeny Pepelyaev, both finished their missions only weeks before Salter arrived in Korea.

== Adaptations ==
The Hunters was serialized in Collier's magazine in March 1956 before its first printing as a book.

In 1958 the novel was adapted with significant plot and character alterations as a film released by Twentieth Century Fox. In particular, the characters of Cleve and Abbott have their ages, experience, and inner demons transposed to accommodate the use of Mitchum in the protagonist's role, but the screenplay also renders Pell a more sympathetic character, Moncavage a less sympathetic one, merges the other wingmen in Cleve's flight into as a single composite character (Corona), and invents a romantic triangle love interest for Mitchum.

== Notes ==
Footnotes

Citations
