= Let Go My Hand =

2017 novel by Edward Docx

- First edition with praise by Hanif Kureishi
- Author: Edward Docx
- Cover artist: Katie Tooke
- Language: English
- Publisher: Picador
- Publication date: 2017
- Publication place: United Kingdom
- Media type: Print
- Pages: 417
- ISBN: 978-0-330-46352-2

Let Go My Hand is the fourth novel by British author Edward Docx.

== Plot introduction ==
Louis Lasker his father Larry is in his seventies and suffering from MND. Together they accompany in their VW camper from Dover to Dignitas in Switzerland. Louis older twin brothers Ralph and Jack join his father as they visit champagne-producing châteaux, ancient caves and go to concerts of classical music, but as they journey to Zürich to consider euthanasia...

== Reception ==
"This is surely one of the first novels to face squarely the issue of assisted dying, and it is equally unflinching in its examination of family dynamics. After a few days in his brothers’ company, Louis wonders: “Is it normal to love the idea of people more than their actuality?” It's a guilty thought that's probably not uncommon, but it takes a writer of Docx's eloquence to articulate it. His lucid prose makes the characters’ complex thoughts engaging, and there are times when the Laskers’ voices are so distinctive that you can almost hear them talking."
