= Lee Mirinae =

South Korean novelist

- Born: Seoul, South Korea
- Occupation: novelist
- Writing career
- Genre: Literary fiction
- Notable work: 8 Lives of a Century-Old Trickster (2023)
- Notable awards: William Saroyan International Prize for Writing
- Website: mirinaelee.com

Lee Mirinae (Korean: 이미리내) is a South Korean writer from Seoul. She is known for her debut novel 8 Lives of a Century-Old Trickster. It is the first novel by a Korean author to win the William Saroyan International Prize for Writing in fiction, and the first novel by a Korean author to be longlisted for the Women's Prize for Fiction.

== Writing ==
Lee is the author of 8 Lives of a Century-Old Trickster, published in 2023 by HarperCollins. The book is inspired by her great-aunt, one of the oldest women to have escaped alone from North Korea. It was originally written in English and has been published in more than 10 different countries.

== Awards and honors ==
Title	Year	Award	Result	Ref.
8 Lives of a Century-Old Trickster	2024	William Saroyan International Prize for Writing	Won	
8 Lives of a Century-Old Trickster	2024	Women's Prize for Fiction	Longlisted	
8 Lives of a Century-Old Trickster	2024	Wilbur Smith Adventure Writing Prize	Longlisted	
8 Lives of a Century-Old Trickster	2025	Prix du roman Fnac	Longlisted	

== Personal life ==
Lee lives in Hong Kong with her family.. Mirinae Lee was born and raised in South Korea. Mirinae lives in Hong Kong with her husband and children.
