= The Riddle of the Labyrinth =

Nonfiction book by Margalit Fox

The Riddle of the Labyrinth: The Quest to Crack an Ancient Code
- US cover
- Author: Margalit Fox
- Publisher: Ecco Press (US), Profile Books (UK)
- Publication date: May 14, 2013
- Pages: 363
- ISBN: 978-0-06-222883-3
- OCLC: 1023259609
- Website: HarperCollins.com

The Riddle of the Labyrinth: The Quest to Crack an Ancient Code is a 2013 nonfiction book by Margalit Fox, about the process of deciphering the Linear B script, and particularly the contributions of classicist Alice Kober. Fox, who has degrees in linguistics, relied on access to Kober's collected letters and papers.

== Synopsis ==
The Riddle of the Labyrinth recounts the history of Linear B, from its 1900 discovery in the Minoan ruins of Crete through its ultimate decipherment in the early 1950s, and describes the work of three people who attempted to solve the puzzle. The language in which the script was written, and most information about the society that produced it, was initially unknown. Predating the Greek alphabet by seven centuries, it represented the earliest known writing in Europe. With no known multilingual inscriptions like the Rosetta Stone, the task of decipherment was thought to be impossible.

Archaeologist Arthur Evans discovered the script on over a thousand clay tablets at Knossos. The tablets contained apparent inventories and palace records. Evans spent decades trying to decode them with little success, having made several erroneous assumptions about the structure of the writing. He also tightly restricted access to the tablets and their transcriptions, pending the publication of his efforts – which happened in 1941, after his death.

Alice Kober, a classics professor at Brooklyn College, worked to decipher the script throughout the 1930s and 40s, up until her death in 1950 at the age of 43. Following Evans' death, Kober helped prepare his work for publication. She learned Akkadian, Basque, Chinese, Hittite, Persian, and other languages to aid her efforts at decipherment, and assembled a system of over 180,000 index cards describing words and other elements of the script. Her discovery of triplets of words with a common root became key to the decipherment.

As a woman in academia in that era, Kober's position demanded that she spend a great deal of time teaching and performing other unpaid work, leaving her little time to work on Linear B. She was also hampered by having a working-class background, not being well-off and having to work to support her elderly mother. During this work, she had little or no social life. Post-war paper shortages led her to repurpose cigarette cartons and hymn sheets in her filing process.

Working at the same time as Kober, and relying on her methods and observations as well as his own theories, the amateur linguist Michael Ventris used place names identified on the tablets to determine that the underlying language was Greek (at a time when it was believed to be Etruscan or Phoenician), and he was ultimately able to decode the script in 1952, eighteen months after Kober's death. Fox suggests that had Kober lived, she may have beaten Ventris to the decipherment.

Kober has historically not garnered the level of recognition given to Evans and Ventris for their contributions, and Fox seeks to correct this oversight.

== Writing ==
While working on her first book, Fox turned to a random page in The Blackwell Encyclopedia of Writing Systems, which contained an entry for Linear B. Hoping to learn more about Ventris, an amateur linguist who was historically given near-total credit for the decipherment, Fox contacted the head of the Program in Aegean Scripts and Prehistory at the University of Texas. Coincidentally, the program had recently completed cataloging Kober's papers, including notebooks, index cards, and correspondence. Fox, previously unaware of Kober's work, traveled to the University to examine the catalogue, becoming the first researcher to have full access to Kober's papers.

== Reception ==
The Riddle of the Labyrinth was named to The New York Times Editor's Choice list in June 2013, and was named one of the Times 100 Notable Books of 2013. It was awarded the William Saroyan International Prize for Writing in 2014.

In his New York Times review, Matti Friedman called The Riddle of the Labyrinth a "gripping and tightly focused scholarly mystery", and wrote that "Fox makes the complexities of linguistic scholarship accessible". He declared her restoration of Kober's standing "an act of historical redemption akin to the one her subject accomplished."

Charlotte Higgins, chief culture writer for The Guardian, described Fox's work as having "the pace and tension of a detective story – [with] much of interest to say about language and writing systems along the way".

Author Patrick Skene Catling wrote that Fox presented the subject with "stylish clarity", and "has been able to portray this unglamorous, reticent academic in all her warm humanity and to give credit to the substantial foundation of scholarly work she left to posterity."

A Russian translation was published in 2016.
