= Richard Lange =

American writer (born 1961)

- Born: 1961 (age 64–65); Oakland, California, U.S.
- Occupation: Writer
- Writing career
- Genre: University of Southern California

Richard Lange (born 1961 in Oakland, California) is an American writer. After receiving a degree in film from the University of Southern California, he traveled to Europe and taught English for Berlitz in Barcelona, Spain. Returning to Los Angeles, he was hired as a copy editor at Larry Flynt Publications and eventually became managing editor of RIP, a heavy-metal music magazine. He later edited textbooks before becoming managing editor of Radio & Records, a radio-industry trade magazine.

Lange is the author of the novels Joe Hustle(Little, Brown/Mulholland 2024), Rovers (Little, Brown/Mulholland 2021), The Smack (Little, Brown/Mulholland 2017), Angel Baby (Little, Brown/Mulholland, 2013), which won the 2013 Hammett Prize, and This Wicked World (Little, Brown, 2009) and the short story collections Sweet Nothing (Little, Brown/Mulholland, 2015) and Dead Boys (Little, Brown, 2007). He has published short stories in various literary journals. "Bank of America" was selected for Best American Mystery Stories of 2004, "Baby Killer" for Best American Mystery Stories of 2011, and "Apocrypha" for Best American Mystery Stories of 2015. "Apocrypha" was awarded the 2015 Short Story Dagger by Great Britain's Crime Writers' Association. Lange was the 2008 recipient of the Rosenthal Family Foundation Award for Fiction from the American Academy of Arts and Letters and a finalist for the 2008 William Saroyan International Prize for Writing. He was awarded a Guggenheim Fellowship in 2009.

In 2023, the Japanese edition of Sweet Nothing, translated by Hiroto Yoshino, was nominated for the Mystery Writers of Japan Award for Mystery Fiction in Translation and won the Translation Mystery Grand Prize.

== Bibliography ==
- Dead Boys - stories (2007)
- This Wicked World - novel (2009)
- Angel Baby - novel (2013)
- Sweet Nothing - stories (2015)
- The Smack - novel (2017)
- Rovers - novel (2021)
- Joe Hustle - novel (2024)
