= Solacers =

2012 memoir by Arion Golmakani

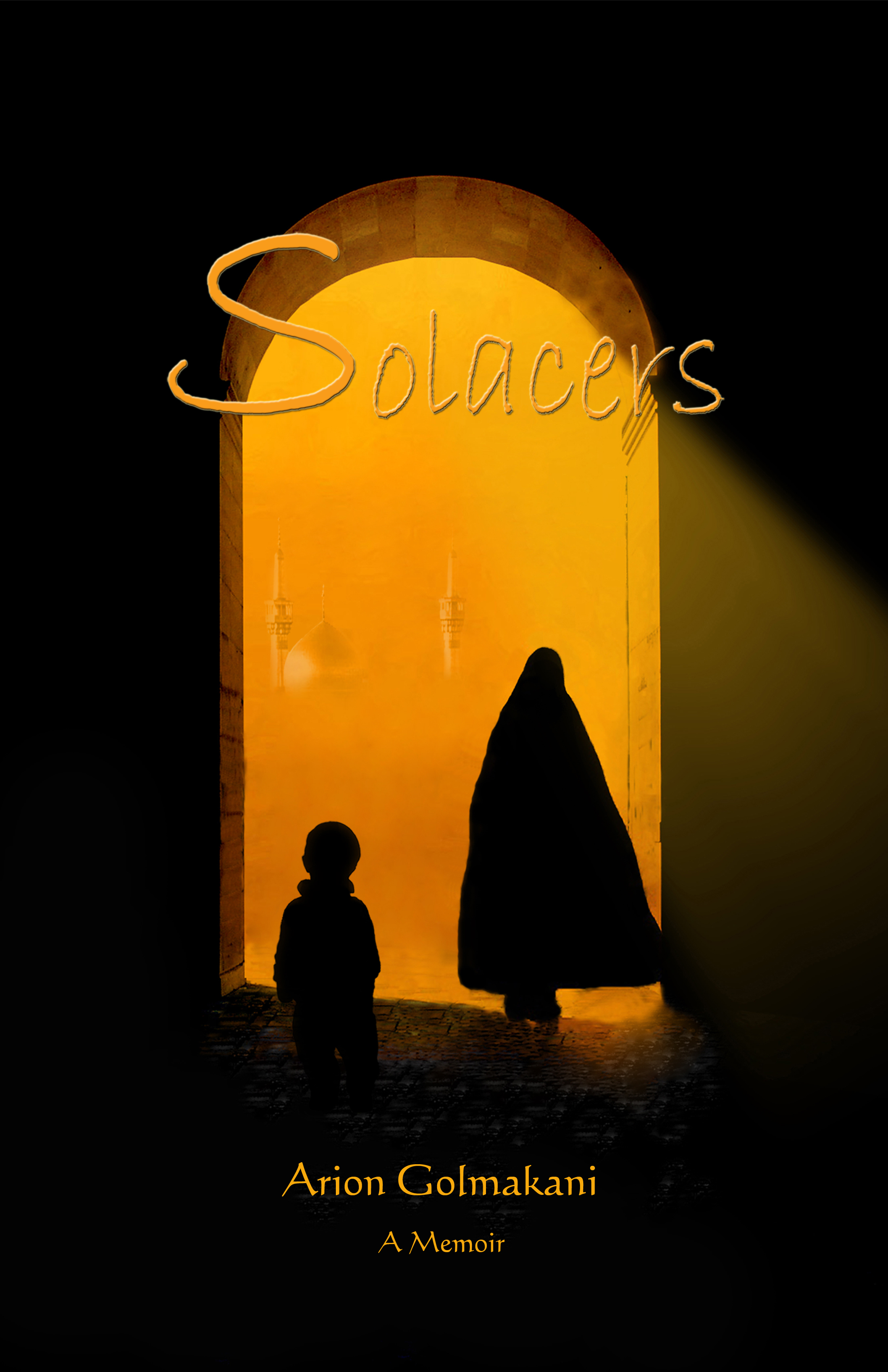
- First edition cover
- Author: Arion Golmakani
- Language: English
- Genre: fiction
- Publisher: RedCornPoppy Books
- Publication date: 2012
- Publication place: United States
- Media type: Print paperback Digital eBook
- Pages: 297 pp
- ISBN: 978-0-615-44526-7 (Paperback edition) ISBN 978-0-615-48042-8 (eBook edition)
- LC Class: LCCN: 2012903463

Solacers is a 2012 fiction written by Iranian author Arion Golmakani. The book is a first-person narrative about an abandoned boy growing up on the streets in 1960s Iran, before the Iranian Revolution of 1979.

== Awards ==
2012 Finalist Nonfiction, William Saroyan International Prize for Writing- Stanford University Libraries.

== Other editions ==
In 2013 Solacers was translated into Persian, by Shadi Hamedi, as Alireza and German as Beraubte Wut.

== Reception ==
While the story itself is often lauded, reviews of Golmakani's writing style are more mixed. Some say that “the story is stronger than the writing,” the work itself is “repetitious and clichéd.” Others meanwhile believe that the “breezy” style of storytelling allows the book to remain approachable despite the serious subject matter.
