= Margalit Fox =

American writer (born 1961)

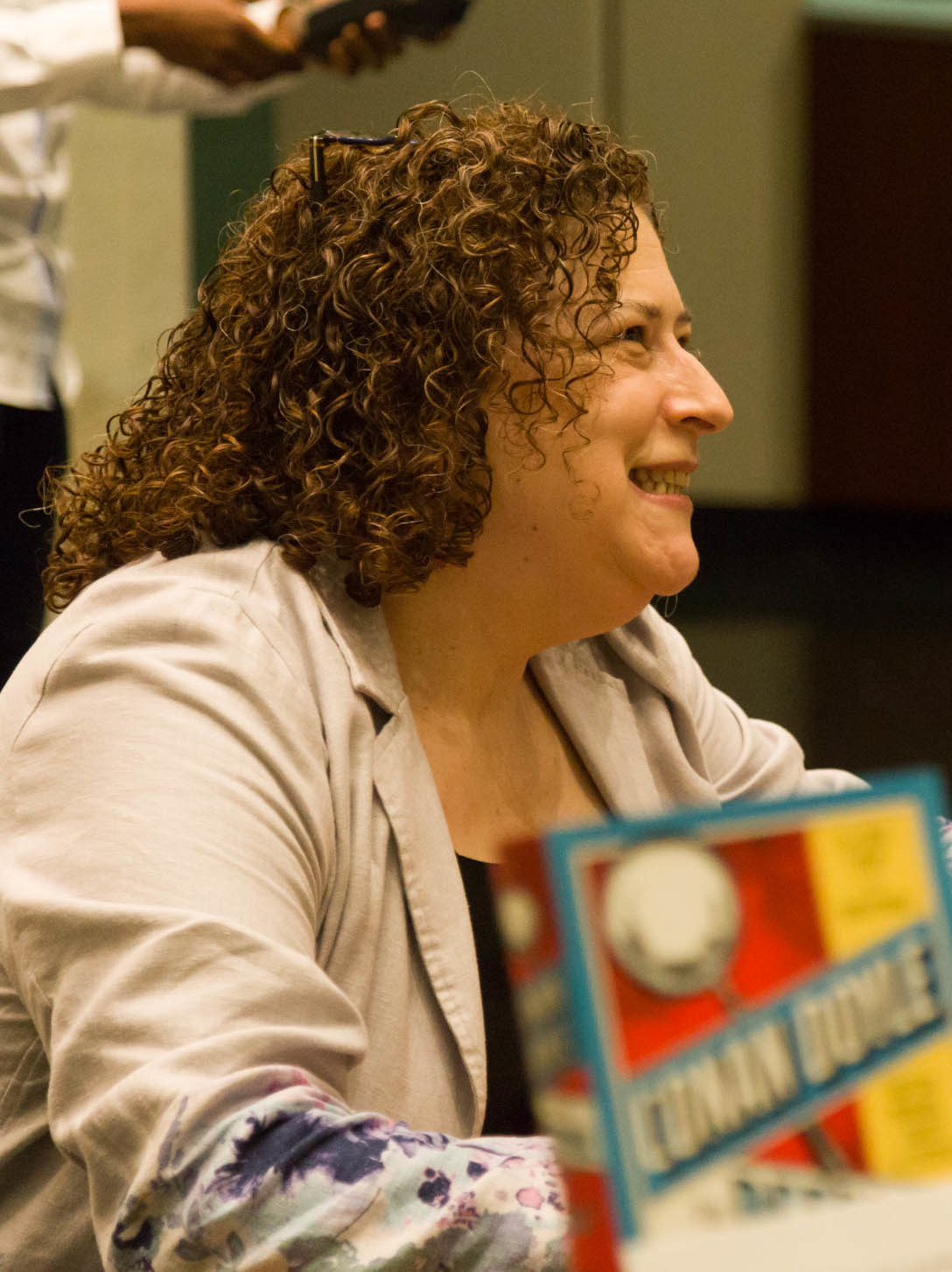
Fox in 2018

Margalit Fox (born April 25, 1961) is an American writer. After earning a master's degree in linguistics, she began her career in publishing in the 1980s. In 1994, she joined The New York Times as a copy editor for its Book Review and later wrote widely on language, culture and ideas for The New York Times, New York Newsday, Variety and other publications. She joined the obituary department of The New York Times in 2004 and authored more than 1,400 obituaries before her retirement from the staff of the paper in 2018. Since 2007, Fox has written several nonfiction books.

== Early life and education ==
Fox was born in Glen Cove, New York, one of three daughters of David (a physicist) and Laura née Garfield. She attended Barnard College in New York City and then Stony Brook University, where she completed her bachelor's degree (1982) and then a master's degree in linguistics in 1983. She received a master's degree from the Columbia University Graduate School of Journalism in 1991. Fox also studied the cello.

== Journalist ==
In the 1980s, before attending journalism school, Fox worked in book and magazine publishing. She joined The New York Times in 1994 as a copy editor for its Book Review. She has written widely on language, culture and ideas for The New York Times, New York Newsday, Variety and other publications. Her work was anthologized in Best Newspaper Writing, 2005. Fox moved to the obituary department of The New York Times in 2004. There she wrote more than 1,400 obituaries before retiring as a senior writer in 2018, penning an article for the paper about her own retirement. She left the newspaper with about 80 advance obituaries that continue to give her New York Times bylines years later. Since 2013, Fox has been a member of the usage panel of the American Heritage Dictionary.

The Newswomen's Club of New York awarded Fox its Front Page Award in 2011 for her collection of work at The New York Times and again in 2015 for "beat reporting". In 2014, she won Stanford University's William Saroyan International Prize for Writing for her book The Riddle of the Labyrinth: The Quest to Crack an Ancient Code. The New York Times also ranked the book as one of the "100 Notable Books of 2013." In 2014, The Paris Review called Fox "An instrumental figure in pushing the obituary past Victorian-era formal constraints". In its 2015 roundup of "Best journalism of 2015", Sports Illustrated referred to her as "The great NYT obit writer". In 2016, Atlantic Monthly described her as "the finest obituarist at The New York Times". Calling her "The Artist of the Obituary", Andrew Ferguson wrote in Commentary magazine: "Margalit Fox is one of those writers ... whose every paragraph carries an undercurrent of humor ... you're never more than a few sentences away from an ironic aside or wry observation or the sudden appearance of some cockeyed fact. ... Stranger still, Fox maintains her writerly bounce despite her regular subject, which is death. ...Fox is ... the best writer all around, at the New York Times. Jay Nordlinger, writing in the National Review, called her obit for Peter Schickele "virtuosic". Her writing is featured in The Sense of Style (2014), the writing guide by Steven Pinker. When asked who he would like to have write his life story, Steven Pinker replied: "Margalit Fox is a linguist, wordsmith, seasoned obituary writer and a bit of a wiseguy. Perfect!"

Fox has said: "In the course of an obit, you're charged with taking your subject from the cradle to the grave, which gives you a natural narrative arc. ... 98 percent of the obit has nothing to do with death, but with life. ... We like to say it's the jolliest department in the paper." She is featured in Vanessa Gould's 2016 documentary film Obit about the New York Times obituary staff.

== Author ==
Since 2007, Fox has published five books, and in 2018 she then began to pursue book writing full-time. She considers that her journalism work was the perfect training for book writing: "All of the structural devices that a book requires – the formal techniques that give a story its shape; keep it moving along nicely; and introduce the reader, bit by comfortable bit, to new concepts – are already fully present in any good newspaper article. It becomes, then, simply a question of magnitude … and endurance."

In their review of Conan Doyle for the Defense (2018), The Guardian said Fox "has worked hard to reshape a classic Edwardian murder case to make it fit with our times. In particular, she wants us to see that the racialisation of crime is nothing new: bad science and economic insecurity have long been responsible for creating 'out groups' on whom we dump our worst terrors." Reviewing the same book, The Wall Street Journal praised Fox's "eye for the telling detail, a forensic sense of evidence and a relish for research."

In 2022 her book, The Confidence Men: How Two Prisoners of War Engineered the Most Remarkable Escape in History, was nominated for the Edgar Award in the category of Best Fact Crime. The New York Times Book Review said that Fox "unspools the men's delightfully elaborate prison-break scheme in nail-biting episodes that advance like a narrative Rube Goldberg machine". Later that year, Thunder Road Films announced that it was developing a film adaptation of the book, with Fox writing the screenplay.

== Personal life ==
Fox is married to writer and critic George Robinson.

== Bibliography ==
=== Books ===
- Talking Hands: What Sign Language Reveals About the Mind, Simon & Schuster (2007) ISBN 978-0-7432-4712-2
- The Riddle of the Labyrinth: The Quest to Crack an Ancient Code, Ecco Press (2013) ISBN 978-0-0622-2883-3
- Conan Doyle for the Defense: The True Story of a Sensational British Murder, a Quest for Justice, and the World's Most Famous Detective Writer, Random House (2018) ISBN 978-0-3995-8945-4
- The Confidence Men: How Two Prisoners of War Engineered the Most Remarkable Escape in History, Random House (2021) ISBN 978-1-9848-5384-4
- The Talented Mrs. Mandelbaum: The Rise and Fall of an American Organized-Crime Boss, Random House, (2024) ISBN 978-0-593-24385-5

=== Selected obituaries ===
- Virginia Hamilton Adair
- Betty Allen
- Maya Angelou
- Emmett L. Bennett, Jr.
- Christine Brooke-Rose
- Joyce Brothers
- Helen Gurley Brown
- Robert N. Buck
- Diahann Carroll
- Robert L. Chapman
- Lili Chookasian
- Hugues Cuénod
- Leo Dillon
- Patty Duke
- Betty Friedan
- John Gardner
- Jim Gary
- Dorothy Gilman
- Crawford Hallock Greenewalt, Jr.
- Arthur Haggerty
- Seamus Heaney
- Katherine Johnson
- Fred Kilgour
- Alice Kober
- Eppie Lederer (Ann Landers)
- Kurt Masur
- Anne McCaffrey
- René A. Morel
- Toni Morrison
- Patricia Neway
- Pauline Phillips (Dear Abby)
- Ingrid Pitt
- Chaim Potok
- James Randi
- Adrienne Rich
- Anneliese Rothenberger
- Albert Schatz
- Jane Scott
- Tony Scott
- Maurice Sendak
- Peter Schickele
- Rudi Stern
- Kirtanananda Swami
- Keith Tantlinger
- Dave Tatsuno
- Marie Tharp
- Blanche Thebom
- Dolores Wilson
- Frances Yeend
