= Daniel James Brown =

American author (born 1951)

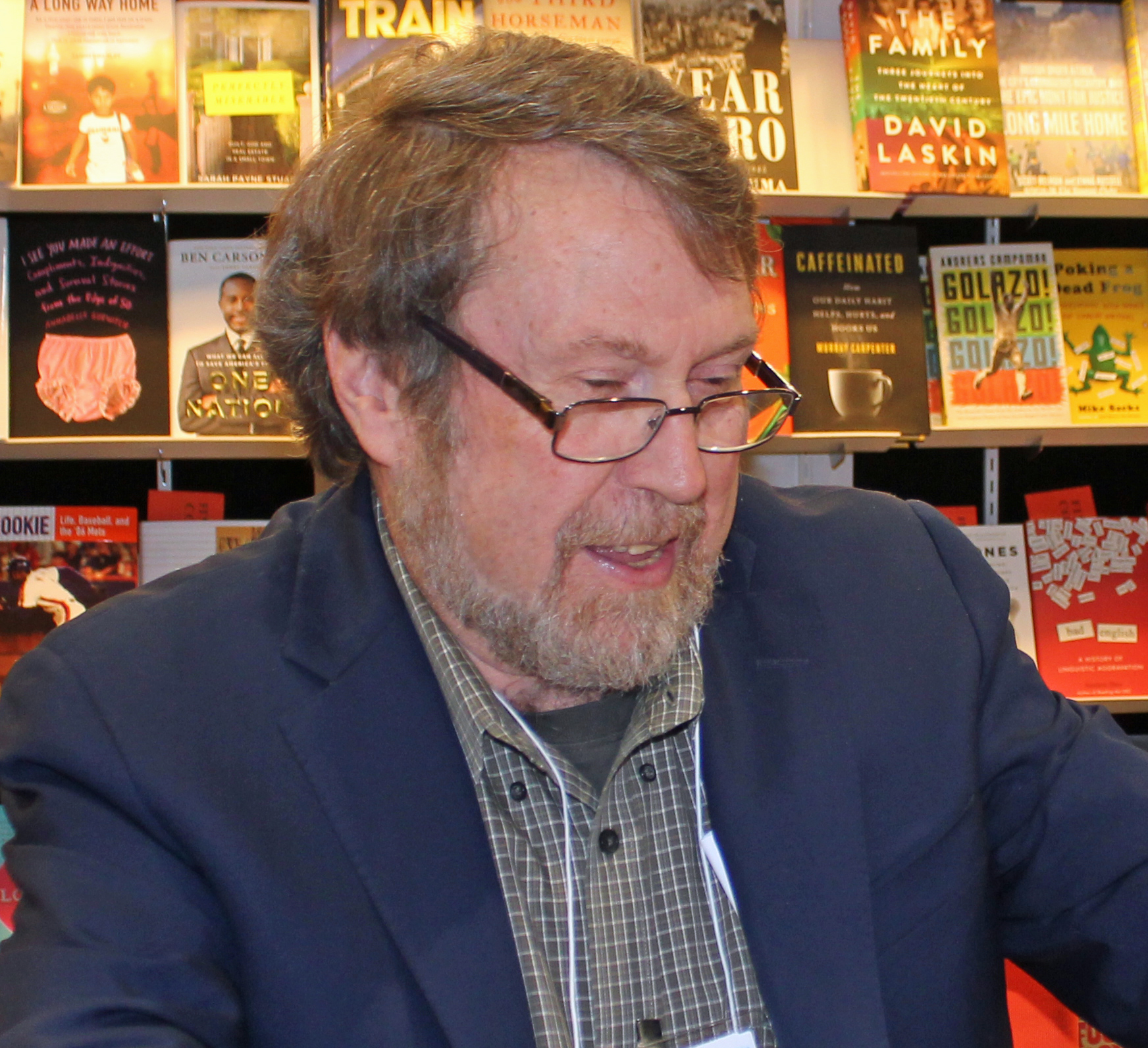
- Brown in 2014.
- Born: 1951 (age 74–75); Berkeley, California, U.S.
- Education: Diablo Valley College; University of California, Berkeley (BA); University of California, Los Angeles (MA)
- Occupation: Author
- Website: www.danieljamesbrown.com

Daniel James Brown (born 1951) is an American author of narrative nonfiction books.

== Biography ==
Brown was born in Berkeley, California. He grew up in the San Francisco Bay Area. He attended Diablo Valley College in Pleasant Hill, California, and earned a Bachelor of Arts degree in English at the University of California at Berkeley and a Master of Arts degree from the University of California at Los Angeles. Brown taught writing at San Jose State University and Stanford University before becoming a technical writer and editor. He now writes narrative nonfiction full-time.

== Career ==
Brown's debut book, Under a Flaming Sky: The Great Hinckley Firestorm of 1894 (2006), traces the personal stories and social, economic, and environmental causes of the Great Hinckley Fire of September 1, 1894, which burned an area of up to 250,000 acres (1,000 km^{2}; 390 sq mi), including the town of Hinckley, Minnesota. The fire killed hundreds, including Brown's great-grandfather.

Brown's second book, The Indifferent Stars Above: The Harrowing Saga of a Donner Party Bride (2009), traces the footsteps of Sarah Graves, a young bride who left her home in Illinois in the spring of 1846, bound for California. Sarah was one of a handful of the ill-fated Donner Party members who attempted to hike out of the Sierra Nevada to save herself and her family.

Brown's third book, The Boys in the Boat (2013), celebrates the 1936 U.S. men's Olympic eight-oar rowing team—9 working-class boys rowing for the University of Washington. It is also the story of one young man in particular, Joe Rantz. MGM and George Clooney's production company purchased the rights to adapt the book for a feature film directed by George Clooney.

Brown's fourth book, Facing the Mountain: A True Story of Japanese American Heroes in World War II (2021), covers the World War II patriotism and courage of the 442nd Regimental Combat Team, a special Japanese American Army unit that overcame brutal odds in Europe; their families, incarcerated behind barbed wire in the American West due to the American internment policy; and a young man who refused to surrender his constitutional rights, even if it meant imprisonment.

== Awards and recognition ==
Under a Flaming Sky, The Great Hinckley Firestorm of 1894 (2006)

- 2006 INDIE NEXT NOTABLE Selection by the American Bookseller's Association
- Barnes & Noble Discover Great New Writers, Summer 2006
- Notable Books of 2006 by Booklist magazine
- Finalist for the 2007 Washington State Book Award

The Indifferent Stars Above, The Harrowing Saga of a Donner Party Bride (2009)

- 2009 INDIE NEXT NOTABLE Selection (June) by the American Bookseller's Association
- New York Times Sunday Book Review Editor's Choice (May 10, 2009)
- Finalist for 2010 Washington State Book Award

The Boys in the Boat, Nine Americans and Their Epic Quest for Gold at the 1936 Olympics (2013)

- Was a finalist of 2014 William Saroyan International Prize for Writing in non-fiction category
- Shortlist for the William Hill Sports Book of the Year 2013
- Notable Books Online 2014 Notable Books
- Indie Next List for July 2013
- 2014 Indies Choice/Adult Nonfiction Book of the Year (American Booksellers Association)
- 2014 Washington State Book Award for Nonfiction
- 2014 Association des Ecrivains Sportifs, Prix Etranger Sport & Littérature
- 2015 One Maryland One Book

On June 8, 2024, the University of Washington awarded Brown with an honorary degree.
