= The Understory =

2007 novel by Pamela Erens

- First edition
- Author: Pamela Erens
- Cover artist: Michael Marquand
- Language: English
- Publisher: Ironweed Press
- Publication date: Sept 2007
- Publication place: United States
- Media type: Print
- Pages: 142
- ISBN: 1-931336-04-0

The Understory is the debut novel by American author Pamela Erens published in 2007 by Ironweed Press, and republished in 2014 by Tin House Books following the success of her second novel, The Virgins. It was a finalist for both the William Saroyan International Prize for Writing fiction prize and the Los Angeles Times Book Prize for First Fiction.

== Plot introduction ==
The story concerns Jack Gorse, a lonely unemployed lawyer with obsessive–compulsive traits whose life is controlled with routine and ritual. The narrative alternates between his past life in Manhattan, and his present life in a Buddhist monastery in Vermont where he attempts to restore neglected bonsai trees. His routine in Manhattan includes visiting the same diner and bookstore every day and walking the same route to Brooklyn Bridge and through Central Park whilst searching for identical twins. But his equilibrium is upset when he is threatened with eviction from his long-term Upper West Side apartment and he becomes attracted to Patrick, the architect planning its redevelopment.

== Title ==
As explained by the protagonist whilst considering the flora of Central Park:

What speaks to me most is close to the ground: the shrubs and vines, rather than the great elms, oaks, and maples. The understory, as botanists call it. In the decades after the war, when the city turned its back on the park—firing the groundskeepers, ceding greater and greater swaths of land to the muggers and drug dealers—it was not the big trees that began to disappear; it was the shrubs: the witch hazel and jetbead, black haw and sweet pepperbush. The park became like the city: skyscrapers, no texture. And that meant it was dying. The things that live at ground level are what hold the earth fast. . . . It is the shrubs that allow the park to survive.

== Reception ==
Vanessa Blakeslee in The Kenyon Review wrote a positive evaluation, noting that "Erens uses ancillary maneuvers to create a psychological study of disturbance, where thought, rhetorical questioning, atmosphere and theme imbue meaning over plot. From the beginning, Erens wisely sets up her quiet tension for escalation in chapters that cut back and forth." And later: "One of the most notable aspects of her fiction is the way she takes 'sensory snapshots' of her world and its inhabitants—honing in on details that may appear tertiary at the time, but which effectively build so that the novel feels like a living, breathing mural. [...] The result is a ruthlessly poignant depiction of a New York City steadily ceding to gentrification." She concluded that "By the book's ending, Erens' focus on a solitary, disturbed man plays as a lyrical sleight-of-hand. For as her themes seamlessly double back and unify, she provokes greater questions—of what happens to those leading quiet lives when they refuse to change, and are pushed to the brink."

== Publication history ==
- 2007, US, Ironweed Press, ISBN 1-931336-04-0, Pub date Sep 2007, Paperback
- 2014, US, Tin House Books, ISBN 1-935639-85-4, Pub date 15 Apr 2014, Paperback
