= Edward Docx =

English writer (born 1972)

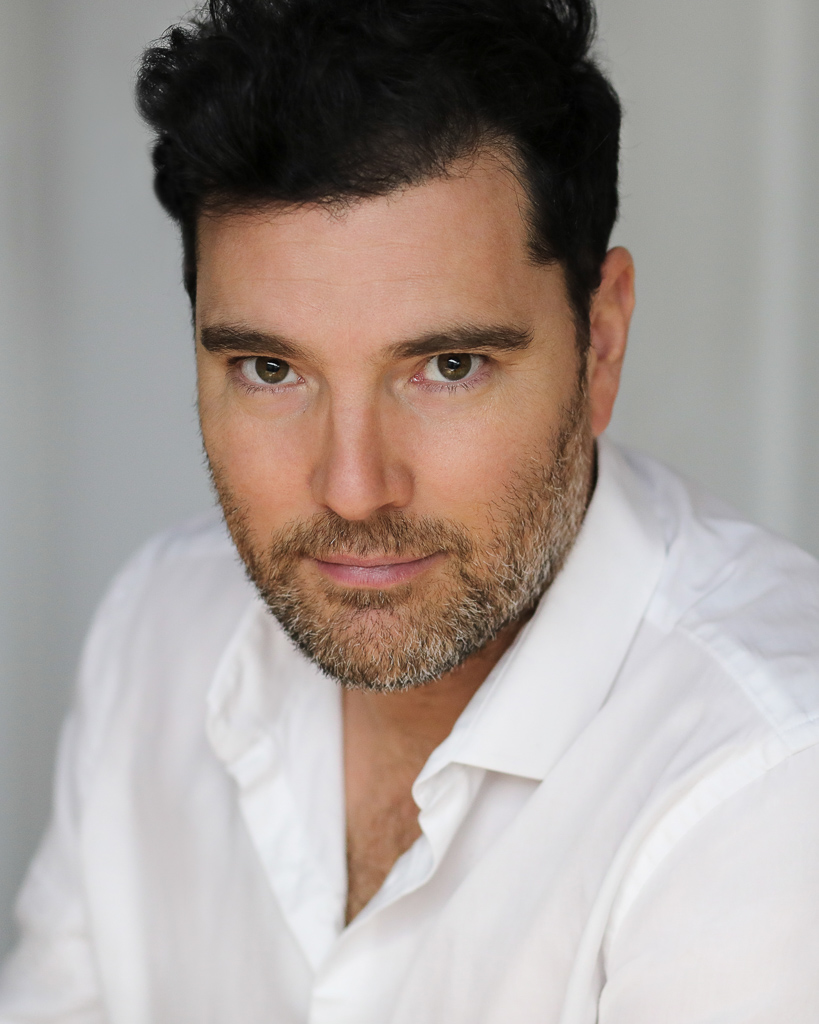
- Edward Docx in 2017
- Born: 1972 (age 53–54); Northern England
- Occupation: Writer
- Writing career
- Notable works: Novels: The Calligrapher, Pravda, The Devil's Garden, Let Go My Hand; Essays: Postmodernism is Dead, Walking with Karl, The Peak, The Clown.

Edward Docx (born 1972) is an English writer.

His first novel, The Calligrapher, was published in 2003. He is an associate editor of New Statesman Magazine.

== Biography ==
Docx was born in the north of England. He was educated at St Bede's College in Manchester and then at Christ's College, Cambridge, where he read English Literature and was President of the JCR.

His mother was a classical music agent and he has described his upbringing as eccentric. He is the eldest child of a family of seven children. He lives in London.

== Works ==
Docx's first novel, The Calligrapher (2003), was short-listed for both the William Saroyan prize and the Guilford Prize. The San Francisco Chronicle called it the best debut book of the year.

This was followed by Pravda (2007, entitled Self Help in the UK), which was long-listed for the Man-Booker Prize (2007) and won the Geoffrey Faber Memorial Prize (2007).

His third novel was The Devil's Garden (2011).

His fourth novel, Let Go My Hand, was published in April 2017 (also by Picador).

Docx's work is often extremely well received by critics in the UK and America. The New York Times has described him as 'fiendishly clever' and The Independent as a 'virtuoso phrasemaker' and one of the most humane writers of his generation. Docx was cited as one of the 21 most gifted young writers from around the world by The Hay Festival Committee (2008).

Docx also works as a screenwriter for television and film. He is a contributing writer on the television adaptation of Slow Horses. He has co-written several film scripts with the Australian director P.J. Hogan and has worked variously with Andrew Davies, Ringside Productions, Rainmark and Mandabach on television drama in the UK.

Docx co-writes the Swift and Hawk series of children's books with Matthew Plampin under the pen name Logan Macx. The first book in the series, Swift and Hawk: Cyberspies, was published in 2022.

== Themes and style ==
Docx has been compared to writers as diverse as Dickens, Dostoyevsky and Coetzee. His writing is often praised for its descriptive skill. His work is chiefly noted for its vitality and the attention given to character as well as style. A review in The New Yorker says "Docx has a gift for assessing “the exact shape and weight of other people’s inner selves, the architecture of their spirit” and even his most ancillary characters flare into being, vital and insistent."

== Journalism ==
Docx has contributed to British and American newspapers and magazines. In the UK, his journalism most often appears in The Guardian, the New Statesman or Prospect magazine. Docx was short-listed for The George Orwell Prize for Journalism in 2012. He was short-listed in 2014 for the Foreign Press Association Feature of the Year. In 2015, he was again long-listed for the George Orwell Rowntree Prize, and for a third time for the Orwell-Rowntree in 2021. He has worked in the House of Commons and has interviewed several British party political leaders.

== Newspaper, radio and television work ==
Docx reviews contemporary fiction for The Guardian. He has also worked extensively on television and radio. He presented his own show for BBC Television and BBC Radio. He has written widely on the cultural importance of literature and is a regular teacher of the Guardian's Masterclass series on fiction.

== Politics ==
During the leadup to the 2016 Brexit vote, Docx campaigned publicly for the UK to remain in the European Union.
