= A Sport and a Pastime =

1967 novel by James Salter

- Book cover
- Author: James Salter
- Language: English
- Genre: Erotic novel
- Set in: France
- Published: March 3, 1967
- Publisher: Doubleday
- Publication place: United States
- Media type: Print
- Pages: 191
- OCLC: 291893

A Sport and a Pastime (1967) is a novel by the American writer James Salter.

== Summary ==
Set in France in the early 1960s, the sad and tender story concerns the erotic affair of American middle-class college drop-out Phillip Dean and a young French girl, Anne-Marie, as witnessed by a self-consciously unreliable narrator. The unnamed narrator freely admits that much of his observation is in fact his own fantasy of the couple, and includes a number of sexually explicit descriptions of their day-to-day existence as he imagines it.

== Location ==
Many of the story's events take place in the town of Autun in Burgundy.

== Reception ==
The book is generally regarded by critics as a modern classic. In The New York Times Book Review, novelist and critic Reynolds Price wrote, "Of living novelists, none has produced a novel I admire more than A Sport and a Pastime ... it's as nearly perfect as any American fiction I know." The critic and biographer Adam Begley, in The New York Times Magazine, called it "extraordinary ... The book feels utterly true." After Salter's death in 2015, the novel has continued to receive critical attention. In 2017, Sarah Hall (writing for The Guardian) observed that:

"Since its publication in 1967, during the decade of sexual revolution, A Sport and a Pastime has set the standard not only for eroticism in fiction, but for the principal organ of literature – the imagination. What appears at first to be a short, tragic novel about a love affair in France is in fact an ambitious, refractive inquiry into the nature and meaning of storytelling, and the reasons we are compelled to invent, in particular, romances. That such a feat occurs across a mere 200 pages is breathtaking, and though its narrative choreography seems simple, the novel is anything but minor."
