= Pamela Erens =

American writer

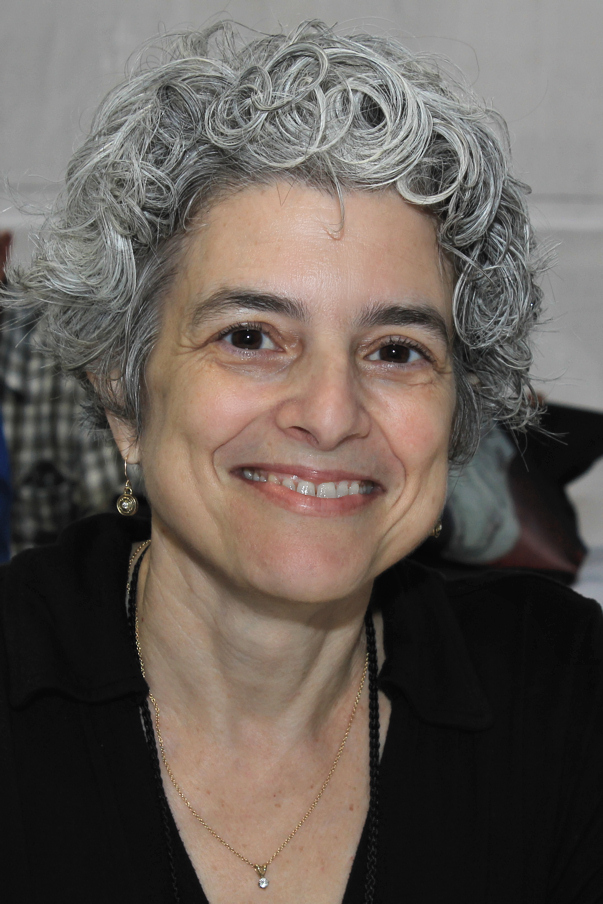
Erens at the 2016 Texas Book Festival.

Pamela Erens is an American writer who appeared on a list compiled by the Reader's Digest of "23 Contemporary Writers You Should Have Read by Now". She has written three critically acclaimed novels for adults, a highly praised novel for middle schoolers, and the memoir/critical hybrid Middlemarch and the Imperfect Life. Her debut novel, The Understory (2007), was a fiction finalist for the William Saroyan International Prize for Writing and the Los Angeles Times Book Prize,. Erens's second novel, The Virgins (2013), received accolades from many sources including The New York Times, The New Yorker and Vanity Fair. It was a finalist for the John Gardner Fiction Book Award. Her third novel, Eleven Hours, was published in May 2016. It was named a Best Book of 2016 by The New Yorker, NPR, and Kirkus. Erens's middle grade novel, Matasha, was published in June 2021. Erens has also written essays and critical articles for publications such as The New York Times, Vogue, Elle, Virginia Quarterly Review, and Los Angeles Review of Books.

== Biography ==
Pamela Erens was brought up in Chicago. Her mother Patricia lectured on film at Rosary College and her father was an attorney. Erens was educated at the Latin School of Chicago, and had a novel published at the age of 14 entitled Fight for Freedom: A Slave Girl's Escape; it was written when she was 10. It concerned the escape to the North of an Arkansas slave girl, accompanied by Harriet Tubman. She went on to study at Phillips Exeter Academy and Yale University. Erens has been a fellow at the Bread Loaf Writers' Conference and the Sewanee Writers' Conference. For many years she was an editor at Glamour magazine. She lives in Maplewood, New Jersey.
