= Self Help (novel) =

2007 book by Edward Docx

- First edition (UK)
- Author: Edward Docx
- Language: English
- Publisher: Picador (UK); Mariner Books (US)
- Publication date: 2007 (UK), 2008 (US)
- Publication place: United Kingdom
- Media type: Print & eBook
- Pages: 320
- ISBN: 0-330-43835-2

Self Help (published as Pravda in the US) is a novel by English author Edward Docx, published in 2007 by Picador; it won Geoffrey Faber Memorial Prize that year and was also long-listed for the Man Booker Prize. The novel has received positive reviews, his description of cities being compared to both Dickens and Dostoevsky.

== Plot introduction ==
"Alone in her native St. Petersburg, Maria Glover sends an urgent summons to London and New York. Her son and daughter arrive too late to see her". Their mother's death marks the beginning of the twins search for the truth about her...
