= The Hunters (1958 film) =

1958 film from the USA directed by Dick Powell

- Lobby card
- Directed by: Dick Powell
- Screenplay by: Wendell Mayes
- Based on: The Hunters; 1957 novel by James Salter
- Produced by: Dick Powell
- Starring: Robert Mitchum; Robert Wagner; Richard Egan; May Britt; Lee Philips
- Cinematography: Charles G. Clarke, A.S.C.
- Edited by: Stuart Gilmore, A.C.E.
- Music by: Paul Sawtell
- Color process: Color by DeLuxe
- Production company: 20th Century Fox
- Distributed by: 20th Century Fox
- Release date: September 1958
- Running time: 108 minutes
- Country: United States
- Language: English
- Budget: $2,440,000
- Box office: $2,100,000 (U.S. rentals)

The Hunters is a 1958 American CinemaScope war film adapted from the novel, The Hunters by James Salter. The picture was produced and directed by Dick Powell and starring Robert Mitchum and Robert Wagner as two very different United States Air Force fighter pilots during the Korean War. The cast also features Richard Egan and May Britt.

== Plot ==
During the Korean War, Major Cleve "Iceman" Saville, a veteran World War II ace, returns to combat, eager to fly the F-86 Sabre jet fighter. His commanding officer, Colonel "Dutch" Imil, assigns him command of a flight. Among his pilots is a new replacement, talented but brash Lieutenant Ed Pell. On his first mission, Pell abandons his element leader to go after a group of MiG-15s, and the other pilot is killed. As a result, Saville wants Pell assigned to someone else, but Imil overrules him. Pell was top of his class in flight school and Imil sees him as a younger version of Saville. If anyone can get Pell to grow up, it is the major.

Another pilot under Saville's command, Lieutenant Carl Abbott, poses a different problem. He lacks confidence in his abilities; his worried wife Kristina asks Saville to watch over him. Saville falls in love with her, and vice versa. Aware of the situation, Abbott offers Saville a deal: his wife in return for the opportunity, if they should run into him, to go one-on-one with "Casey Jones", the most feared enemy ace. A disgusted Saville turns him down. Nevertheless, on a mission soon afterward, Abbott tangles with Casey Jones and is shot down behind enemy lines. Saville shoots down the enemy ace, then searches for Abbott. When he spots Abbott's parachute, Saville deliberately crash-lands his aircraft nearby, disobeying standing orders. He cuts the injured Abbott down from a tree, but they are immediately attacked by an enemy patrol. Pell strafes the enemy infantrymen, but they shoot him down and he joins his comrades on the ground. The trio then set out through enemy territory toward friendly lines.

Along the way, they are assisted by a Korean Christian farmer and his family. When an enemy patrol happens by, the Americans hide. However, in their haste, they leave behind a flight jacket, which is spotted. As a result, the entire family is executed, including a young girl. Saville and Pell avenge them, ambushing and wiping out the patrol, but Saville is shot in the shoulder. Wounded, exhausted, and hungry, the three airmen finally reach the safety of UN lines.

Afterward, Saville and Abbott convalesce in a military hospital. Abbott is to be transferred back to the U.S. to recuperate. His brush with death has changed his priorities; he remorsefully asks Kristina for another chance at their marriage. She decides to go with him.

== Cast ==
- Robert Mitchum as Major Cleve Saville
- Robert Wagner as Lieutenant Ed Pell
- Richard Egan as Colonel Dutch Imil
- May Britt as Kristina "Kris" Abbott
- Lee Philips as 1st Lieutenant Carl Abbott
- John Gabriel as 1st Lieutenant Corona
- Stacy Harris as Colonel Monk Moncavage
- Victor Sen Yung as Korean farmers
- Candace Lee as Korean child

Uncredited:

- John Doucette as Sergeant
- Larry Thor as Captain Owynby
- Ralph Manza as Gifford
- Nobu McCarthy as Japanese clerk
- Kam Tong as Communist Chinese officer
- Rachel Stephens as Air Force nurse
- Nina Shipman as WAF lieutenant
- Robert Reed as Jackson
- Aki Aleong as MiG pilot

== Production ==
Wendell Hayes said the film "wasn't so good, except it had an interesting idea that we were not allowed to follow through.. It was about a man who loved war, but we had a problem trying to sell a hero who loved war... I was called in on it, actually, in desperation, because they had a starting date, and they really didn't have a script to shoot; and while we used the title, what I wrote was from start to finish an original screenplay. There wasn't anything else to do, because the novel could not be adapted. It was too internal. They do make mistakes in Hollywood in buying material. They will buy a novel that is terribly internal, and the only way you can really do it is if you have a voice-over explaining what the character is thinking. In doing a film, your characters can't think; they can only speak or move, and you've got to tell the story with their voice or their movements."

The flying scenes were principally filmed over the southwest United States in the vicinity of Luke and Williams Air Force Bases in Arizona. Ramp scenes were filmed at Luke while take-offs were staged from Gila Bend Air Force Auxiliary Field, which had the requisite primitive appearance, appropriate mountain backdrops, and where exteriors simulating rice paddies and a gate for Suwon Air Base could be erected.

Operational F-86 Sabre fighters, which were still front line aircraft at the time, were used in the aerial sequences. Although the group portrayed in the movie ("54th Fighter Group") is a fictitious amalgam of actual units in Korea, the unit markings displayed were those of the 51st Fighter-Interceptor Wing, which was based at Suwon until 1954. The crash footage of an F-100 Super Sabre was used in one scene to represent the attempted landing of an F-86. USAF F-84F Thunderstreak fighters were painted with North Korea paint schemes and insignia to portray enemy MiG-15s. A C-130A Hercules was used as an aerial photography platform. Palm Beach AFB, Florida was the main base where aircraft used in the film were parked and maintained during the production.

With this film, director Dick Powell completed his obligations to 20th Century Fox in his producing-directing contract, having already delivered The Enemy Below (1957) starring Mitchum.

== Reception ==
Considered a lackluster war drama, The Hunters did not fare well with critics, although most audiences saw it as a widescreen epic. Director Dick Powell strove to create an authentic "look" with carefully set up scenes focusing on military personnel and the jet fighter operations that underlined the main action scenes. Howard Thompson in his review for The New York Times, noted: "Performed well enough by a pretty good, predominantly male cast, headed by Robert Mitchum, and handsomely produced by Dick Powell, who also directed, the result is a respectable, rather neutrally flavored film that somehow only matters when aloft."

Likewise, reviewer Mark Hassan in a later review, opined, "The real star of the film is the extraordinary aerial cinematography".

According to Lt. Col. Charles D. Bright, himself an F-86 pilot in Korea, comparing and contrasting the novel and the film version in the Aerospace Historian, "The plot was changed greatly, and not for the better." (Note: In particular, the characters of Cleve and Abbott have their ages, experience, and inner demons reversed to accommodate the use of Mitchum in the protagonist's role. Moreover, Pell is also rendered as a more sympathetic character, Moncavage as a less sympathetic one, the other wingmen in Cleve's flight are merged into as a single composite character (Corona), and a romantic triangle love interest for Mitchum is invented.)

== See also ==
- List of American films of 1958
