= The Sound of a Wild Snail Eating =

2010 book by Elisabeth Tova Bailey

- Author: Elisabeth Tova Bailey
- Language: English
- Subject: Ecology
- Publisher: Algonquin Books
- Publication date: 2010
- Publication place: United States
- ISBN: 978-1565126060

The Sound of a Wild Snail Eating is a 2010 non-fiction book written by Elisabeth Tova Bailey.

== Summary ==
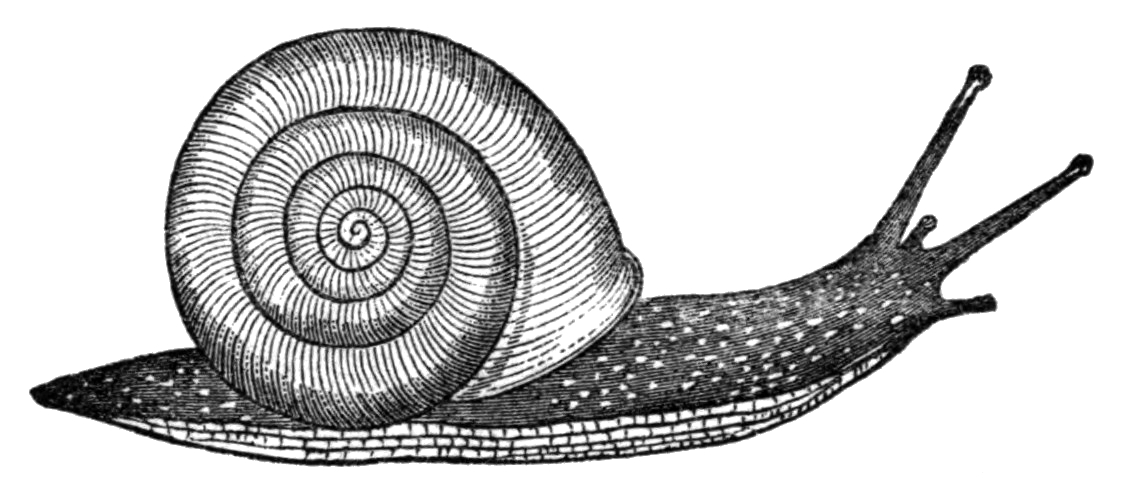
Drawing of live animal of Neohelix albolabris

The book describes the author's observations of an individual land snail in the species Neohelix albolabris, which lived in a terrarium next to her while she was confined to bed through dysautonomia, mitochondrial disease and chronic fatigue syndrome. The presence of the snail offered the author the opportunity to discover the peculiarities of its anatomy and behaviour, and helped her to cope with her own illness. She also deepened the scientific aspects of her small guest's natural history, and became aware of the richness of its existence. In the last page of the book Tova Bailey wishes terrestrial snails to survive to the ongoing Holocene extinction.

== Terraria and illness ==
In her essay A Green World Deep in Winter: The Bedside Terrarium, published in the Yale Journal for Humanities in Medicine, Bailey describes how Nathaniel Bagshaw Ward, inventor of the Wardian case, had published during the mid 19th century a report on the "Use of Closed Cases in Illness", explaining the benefit of a terrarium to bed-ridden patients in order to "beguile many a weary hour".

== Awards ==
- Winner of the 2010 John Burroughs Medal.
- Winner of the 2010 Natural History Literature category of the National Outdoor Book Award (joint award).
- Winner of the 2012 non-fiction category of the William Saroyan International Prize for Writing.

== Translations ==
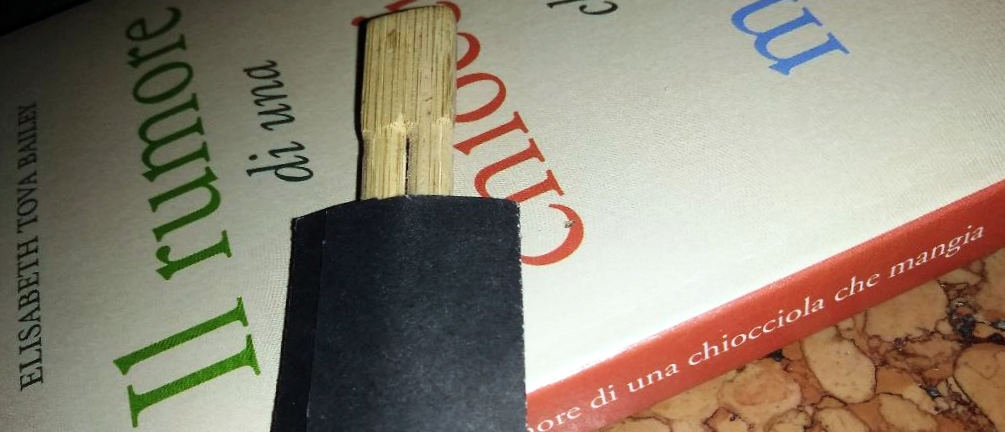
2018 Italian edition by Marsilio

As far as late 2019 The Sound of a Wild Snail Eating has been translated into eleven languages.

== Movie adaptation ==
A short movie (15'), inspired by the book and directed by Elisabeth Tova Bailey herself, was presented in 2019 at the 8th edition of the Brattleboro Film Festival and entered the official selection of the 2019 American Conservation Film Festival
