= The Calligrapher =

2003 novel by Edward Docx

- First edition (UK)
- Author: Edward Docx
- Language: English
- Publisher: Fourth Estate (UK); Houghton Mifflin Harcourt (US)
- Publication date: 2003
- Publication place: United Kingdom
- Media type: Print
- Pages: 368
- ISBN: 1-84115-543-8

The Calligrapher is the debut novel of Edward Docx, published in 2003. It was selected by both San Francisco Chronicle and San Jose Mercury as a 'Best Book of the Year'. It was also a finalist for the William Saroyan International Prize for Writing. As of 2012 it had been translated into eight languages.

== Plot introduction ==
Narrated by Jasper Jackson, an accomplished calligrapher and serial seducer living off Warwick Avenue, London, the story tells how his seemingly perfect life unravels when his most recent infidelity is discovered and his girlfriend Lucy leaves him. Jasper, though, is soon captivated by a new neighbour Madeleine Belmont, a travel-writer, whilst he is commissioned to transcribe the Songs and Sonnets of John Donne for a wealthy American businessman. The book describes his growing love and commitment to Madeleine, illuminated by observations from the sonnets he is transcribing. But will his relationship with Madeleine last?

== Reception ==
- Stephen Metcalf in the New York Times writes 'Docx, a columnist by trade, frequently writes like a columnist by habit, in terse editorial sound bites... Nonetheless, the pace is mostly brisk, the tone most often light, and there are a few streaks of fiendish cleverness.'
- Diane White of The Boston Globe describes it as 'a delight, a witty, deftly written, honest comedy of manners', 'a novel that is as intelligent and sophisticated as it is light and funny'.
- Mark Rozzo of the Los Angeles Times warns "At times, you wonder whether Docx isn't almost too fluent. Like his sure-handed hero, he has a flair for flourishes and curlicues. Yet there's something undeniably winning about a novel that dares to use the randy love poems of John Donne as a running thread (each chapter corresponds to a song or sonnet that Jasper is transcribing) and yet somehow manages to come off as a Fox Searchlight Pictures comedy coming to a theater near you.
- The Economist concludes with "The beauty of Donne's words provides a satisfyingly crisp contrast to the book's laddish, laugh-aloud dialogue and strong characterisation is maintained throughout. Charmer and philanderer he may be, but Jasper's optimism and zest for life give him the appeal of a man ruled by both his head and his heart. If readers can suspend disbelief at the painfully shocking double-whammy served up at the end of the story, then this stylishly written, pacy novel is a sexy, satisfying read."
