= Light Years (novel) =

1975 novel by James Salter

Light Years, published in 1975, is the fourth novel by American writer James Salter.

== Plot summary ==
The story begins in 1958. Viri and Nedra live an idyllic life with their children, Franca and Danny, in the Hudson River Valley. Viri works as an architect in the city, and the couple enjoy hosting dinner for a variety of friends. The first set of friends while leaving the house after dinner with the couple are divided in their opinion of the pair, with Peter admiring their semi-bohemian lifestyle, and Catherine sees Nedra as selfish. Around this same time, the family misplace their new pet tortoise.

While on the outside it seems like family have the perfect life, both Viri and Nedra conduct affairs, and imagine themselves traveling to Europe and expanding their circle of friends.

Nedra's father gets sick and dies, with his daughter traveling back to her home town, Altoona, Pennsylvania, to say goodbye shortly before his death, and to clear out his belongings and sell his house. Nedra vows to herself to never return.

With their children now teenagers and young adults, the pair finally travels to England. Though appearing content, Nedra indicates that things will change for the couple when they return from their vacation.

The following year the couple divorces, and Nedra leaves again for Europe, having a number of encounters with other single men. Viri is left stunned, remaining in the house with his children, who have started to make lives of their own.

Nedra returns to the United States for Danny's wedding, renting an apartment in the city and trying to enter the arts world, encountering a disciplined theater troupe that she tries to join, and is rejected for being too old. She continues to conduct affairs.

Peter gets sick with a rare terminal illness, bringing both Viri and Nedra to see Peter and Catherine more frequently before he finally dies.

Both in their late forties, both reflect on their lives, separately concluding that the biggest confirmation of their identity and that they have made their mark, are their children.

To everyone's surprise, Viri sells the house.

Nedra dies in the same manner as her father. After her funeral, Viri travels back to where the house was and in the field adjoining, finds the tortoise lost so long previously, still alive. He comes to understand his place in his life, and feels ready to face the rest of his life.

== Characters ==
- Viri - an architect, married to Nedra.
- Nedra - married to Viri. Her character often feel like she has somehow missed out, and is always in search for more.
- Franca - eldest daughter of Viri and Nedra.
- Danny (Karen) - youngest daughter of Viri and Nedra.
- Jivan - younger man with whom Nedra conducts an affair.
- Peter and Catherine - couple who dine with Viri and Nedra at intermittent points of the story. Catherine is dubious about Nedra's motivations and behaviour.
- Eva - a counterpoint character to Nedra, who is divorced and independent, but treated in some ways like an outlier.

Salter based the character of Nedra on Barbara Rosenthal, wife of composer Laurence Rosenthal, who were neighbors of Salter in New City, New York.

== Reception ==
Although the novel received mixed reviews when it was released, Salter's novel is now highly regarded, with his work revived after his death in 2015.
