= James Salter =

American writer (1925–2015)

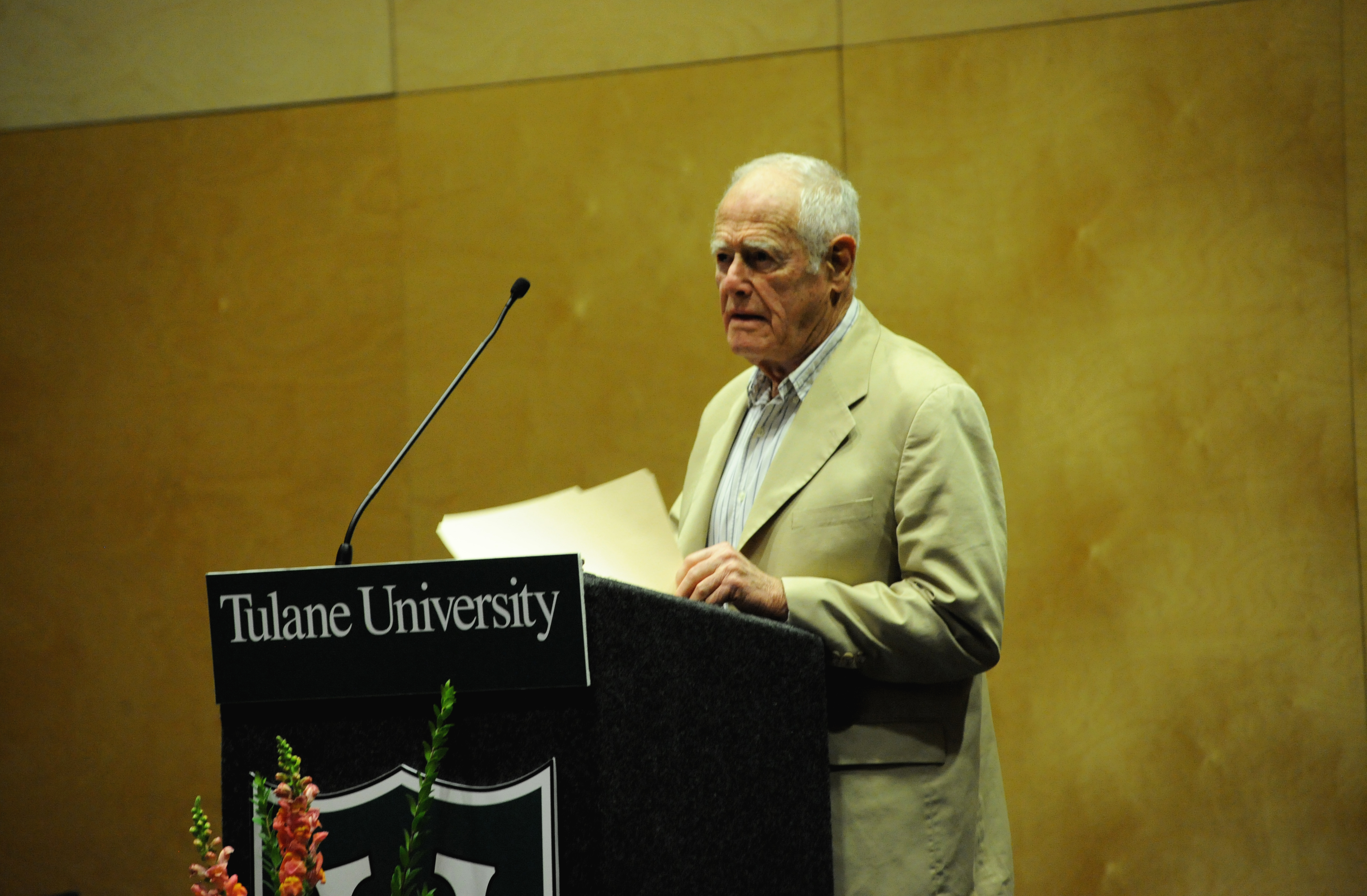
- Salter in 2010
- Born: James Arnold Horowitz; June 10, 1925; Passaic, New Jersey, U.S.
- Died: June 19, 2015 (aged 90); Sag Harbor, New York, U.S.
- Occupation: Writer
- Spouses: Ann Altemus (m. 1951; div. 1975); Kay Eldridge (m. 1998)
- Children: 5
- Writing career
- Pen name: James Salter
- Notable works: A Sport and a Pastime, All That Is

James Arnold Horowitz (June 10, 1925 – June 19, 2015), better known as James Salter, his pen name and later-adopted legal name, was an American novelist and short-story writer. Originally a career officer and pilot in the United States Air Force, he resigned from the military in 1957 following the successful publication of his first novel, The Hunters.

After a brief career in film writing and film directing, in 1979 Salter published the novel Solo Faces. He won numerous literary awards for his works, including belated recognition of works that were criticized at the time of their publication.

== Biography ==
On June 10, 1925, Salter was born and named James Arnold Horowitz, the son of Mildred Scheff and George Horowitz. His father was a real estate broker and businessman who had graduated from West Point in November 1918 and served in the Corps of Engineers with both Army and Army Reserve. The elder Horowitz attained the rank of colonel and was a recipient of the Legion of Merit.

Horowitz grew up in Manhattan, where he attended P.S.6, and the Horace Mann School – his classmates included Julian Beck. While he intended to study at Stanford University or MIT, he entered West Point on July 15, 1942, at the urging of his father – who had rejoined the Corps of Engineers in July 1941, in anticipation of war breaking out. (With others from his original Class of 1919, George Horowitz was called back to West Point after a month of duty to complete a post-graduate officer's course.) Like his father, Horowitz's time at West Point was shortened due to wartime class sizes being greatly increased and the curriculum drastically shortened. He graduated in 1945 after just three years, ranked 49th in general merit in his class of 852.

He completed flight training during his first class year, with primary flight training at Pine Bluff, Arkansas, and advanced training at Stewart Field, New York. On a cross-country navigation flight in May 1945, his flight became scattered and, low on fuel, he mistook a railroad trestle for a runway, crash-landing his T-6 Texan training craft into a house in Great Barrington, Massachusetts. Possibly as a result, he was assigned to multi-engine training in B-25s until February 1946. He received his first unit assignment with the 6th Troop Carrier Squadron, stationed at Nielson Field, the Philippines; Naha Air Base, Okinawa; and Tachikawa Air Base, Japan. He was promoted to 1st lieutenant in January 1947.

Horowitz was transferred in September 1947 to Hickam AFB, Hawaii, then entered post-graduate studies at Georgetown University in August 1948, receiving his master's degree in January 1950. He was assigned to the headquarters of Tactical Air Command at Langley AFB, Virginia, in March 1950, where he remained until volunteering for assignment in the Korean War. He arrived in Korea in February 1952 after transition training in the F-86 Sabre with the 75th Fighter-Interceptor Squadron at Presque Isle Air Force Base, Maine. He was assigned to the 335th Fighter-Interceptor Squadron, 4th Fighter-Interceptor Wing, a renowned MiG-hunting unit. He flew more than 100 combat missions between February 12 and August 6, 1952, and was credited with a MiG-15 victory on July 4, 1952.

Horowitz subsequently was stationed in Germany and France, promoted to major, and assigned to lead an aerial demonstration team; he became a squadron operations officer, in line to become a squadron commander. Inspired by Under Milk Wood, in his off-duty time he wrote his first novel, The Hunters, publishing it in 1956 under the pen name "James Salter". The film rights to the novel allowed Salter to leave active duty with the US Air Force in 1957 to write full-time. He also legally changed his name to Salter. Having served twelve years in the US Air Force, the last six as a fighter pilot, Salter found the transition to full-time writer difficult.

The 1958 film adaptation, The Hunters starring Robert Mitchum, was honored with acclaim for its powerful performances, moving plot, and realistic portrayal of the Korean War. Although an excellent adaptation by Hollywood standards, it was very different from the original novel, which dealt with the slow self-destruction of a 31-year-old fighter pilot, who had once been thought a hot shot but only found frustration in his first combat experience while others around him achieved glory, some of it perhaps invented.

His 1961 novel The Arm of Flesh drew on his experiences flying with the 36th Fighter-Day Wing at Bitburg Air Base, Germany, between 1954 and 1957. An extensively revised version of the novel was reissued in 2000 as Cassada. Salter however, later disdained both of his "Air Force" novels as products of youth "not meriting much attention". After several years in the Air Force Reserve, he severed his military connection completely in 1961 by resigning his commission after his unit was called up to active duty for the Berlin Crisis.

He moved back to New York with his family. Salter and his first wife Ann divorced in 1975, having had four children: daughters Allan (1955–1980) and Nina (born 1957), and twin children Claude and James (born 1962). Starting in 1976 he lived with journalist and playwright Kay Eldredge. They had a son, Theo Salter, born in 1985, and Salter and Eldredge married in Paris in 1998. Eldredge and Salter co-authored a book entitled Life Is Meals: A Food Lover's Book of Days, in 2006.

== Writing career ==
Salter took up film writing, first as a writer of independent documentary films, winning a prize at the Venice Film Festival in collaboration with television writer Lane Slate (Team, Team, Team). He also wrote for Hollywood, although disdainful of it. His last script, commissioned and then rejected by Robert Redford, became his novel Solo Faces.

A writer of modern American fiction, Salter was critical of his own work, having said that only his 1967 novel A Sport and a Pastime comes close to living up to his standards. Set in post-war France, A Sport and a Pastime is a piece of erotica involving an American student and a young Frenchwoman, told as flashbacks in the present tense by an unnamed narrator who barely knows the student, also yearns for the woman, and freely admits that most of his narration is fantasy. Many characters in Salter's short stories and novels reflect his passion for European culture and, in particular, for France, which he describes as a "secular holy land".

Critic Jeffrey Meyers describes Salter's style as located between “the lush romanticism of Scott Fitzgerald and the stoic realism of Ernest Hemingway”. In interviews with his biographer, William Dowie, Salter described his enthusiasm for Isaac Babel, André Gide and Thomas Wolfe. He once described his own writing (in A Sport and a Pastime) as "succinct" and "compressed". Salter often used short sentences and sentence fragments, switching between first and third persons, as well as between the present and past tenses. His dialogue is attributed only when necessary to keep clear who is speaking, otherwise he allows the reader to draw inferences from tone and motivation.

His 1997 memoir Burning the Days uses this prose style to chronicle the impact his experiences at West Point, in the Air Force, and as a celebrity pseudo-expatriate in Europe had on the way he viewed his life-style changes. Although it appears to celebrate numerous episodes of adultery, in fact, Salter is reflecting on what has transpired and the impressions of him it has left, just as does his poignant reminiscence on the death of his daughter. A line from The Hunters expresses these feelings: "They knew nothing of the past and its holiness."

Salter published a collection of short stories, Dusk and Other Stories in 1988. The collection received the PEN/Faulkner Award, and one of its stories ("Twenty Minutes") became the basis for the 1996 film Boys. He was elected to The American Academy of Arts and Letters in 2000. In 2012, PEN/Faulkner Foundation selected him for the 25th PEN/Malamud Award saying that his works show the readers "how to work with fire, flame, the laser, all the forces of life at the service of creating sentences that spark and make stories burn".

His final novel, All That Is, was published to excellent reviews in 2013.

Salter's writings—including correspondence, manuscripts, and heavily revised typescript drafts for all of his published works including short stories and screenplays—are archived at the Harry Ransom Center in Austin, Texas.

In the fall of 2014 Salter became the first Kapnick Writer-in-Residence at the University of Virginia.

He died on June 19, 2015, in Sag Harbor, New York.

== Awards and honors ==
- 2014 Awarded the Fitzgerald Award for Achievement in American Literature award which is given annually in Rockville Maryland, the city where Fitzgerald, his wife, and his daughter are buried as part of the F. Scott Fitzgerald Literary Festival.
- 2013 Windham–Campbell Literature Prize
- 2012 PEN/Malamud Award
- 2010 Rea Award for the Short Story
- 1989 PEN/Faulkner Award

== Reception ==
His friend and fellow author, the Pulitzer Prize-winner Richard Ford, said, "It is an article of faith among readers of fiction that James Salter writes American sentences better than anybody writing today," in his Introduction to Light Years for Penguin Modern Classics. Michael Dirda of the Washington Post is reported to have said that with a single sentence, he could break one's heart. In an introduction to the final interview he gave before his death, Guernica described Salter as having "a good claim to being the greatest living American novelist".

Writer Vivian Gornick had an altogether different take on his most recent writing. In her review of All That Is for Bookforum, she wrote "Certainly, it is true that most writers have only one story in them.... Then again, it is also true that it is the writer's obligation to make the story tell more the third or fourth time around than it did the first. For this reviewer, Salter's work fails on this score. In his eighties he is telling the story almost exactly as he told it in his forties." She also wrote that he was "so out of touch with the life we are actually living".

== Works ==
=== Novels ===
- The Hunters (1957)
- The Arm of Flesh (1961)
- A Sport and a Pastime (1967)
- Light Years (1975)
- Solo Faces (1979)
- Cassada (2012)
- All That Is (2013)

=== Story collections ===
- Dusk and Other Stories (1988)
- Last Night (2005)
- Collected Stories (2013)

=== Screenplays ===
- Downhill Racer (1969)
- The Appointment (1969)
- Three (1969; also directed)
- Threshold (1981)

=== Other works ===
- Still Such (1988)
- Burning the Days (1997)
- Gods of Tin: The Flying Years (2004)
- There and Then: The Travel Writing of James Salter (2005)
- Life Is Meals: A Food Lover's Book of Days (with Kay Eldredge, 2006)
- Memorable Days: The Selected Letters of James Salter and Robert Phelps (2010)
- The Art of Fiction (2016)
- Don't Save Anything (2017)

=== Stories ===
Title	Publication	Collected in
"Sundays"	The Paris Review 36 (Summer 1966)	from A Sport and a Pastime
"Am Strande von Tanger"	The Paris Review 44 (Fall 1968)	Dusk and Other Stories
"The Cinema"	The Paris Review 49 (Summer 1970)	Dusk and Other Stories
"The Destruction of the Goetheanum"	The Paris Review 51 (Winter 1971)	Dusk and Other Stories
"Dirt" aka "Cowboys"	The Carolina Quarterly 23.2 (1971)	Dusk and Other Stories
"Via Negativa"	The Paris Review 55 (Fall 1972)	Dusk and Other Stories
"Line of Ascent"	Esquire (June 5, 1979)	from Solo Faces
"Akhnilo"	Grand Street 1.1 (Autumn 1981)	Dusk and Other Stories
"Lost Sons"	Grand Street 2.2 (Winter 1983)	Dusk and Other Stories
"Foreign Shores"	Esquire (September 1983)	Dusk and Other Stories
"Dusk" aka "The Fields at Dusk"	Esquire (August 1984)	Dusk and Other Stories
"Twenty Minutes"	Grand Street 7.2 (Winter 1988)	Dusk and Other Stories
"American Express"	Esquire (February 1988)	Dusk and Other Stories
"Comet"	Esquire (July 1993)	Last Night
"My Lord You"	Esquire (September 1994)	Last Night
"Last Night"	The New Yorker (November 18, 2002)	Last Night
"Bangkok"	The Paris Review 166 (Summer 2003)	Last Night
"Give"	Tin House 17 (Fall 2003)	Last Night
"Arlington"	Hartford Courant (October 12, 2003)	Last Night
"Such Fun"	Tin House 22 (Winter 2004)	Last Night
"Eyes of the Stars"	Zoetrope: All-Story (Winter 2004)	Last Night
"Platinum"	Last Night (2005)	Last Night
"Palm Court"	Last Night (2005)	Last Night
"Virginia"	The Paris Review 203 (Winter 2012)	from All That Is
"Charisma"	Collected Stories (2013)	Collected Stories

== Miscellaneous ==
- James Salter's literature has been featured in the 2014 NSW Higher School Certificate.
- He is the subject of the closing section of Katie Roiphe's 2016 book The Violet Hour: Great Writers at the End.
