= Manu (name) =

Male given name

Manu is a given name which may be derived from Manuel, or an unrelated name of Hindu origin. It can also be a surname. Notable people with the name include:

== As a given name ==
=== Actors ===
- Manu Bennett (born 1969), New Zealand actor, best known as "Crixus" on the television series Spartacus: Blood and Sand
- Manu Narayan (born 1973), American actor, and lead singer of the band DARUNAM
- Manu Payet (born 1975), French actor, comedian, radio and television presenter
- Manu Rishi (born 1971), Indian actor
- Manu Tupou (1935–2004), American actor

=== Musicians ===
- Manu Chao (born 1961), French-born singer and musician of Spanish origin
- Manu Cornet (born 1981), French musician and writer
- Manu Delago (born 1984), Austrian composer
- Manu Dibango (1933–2020), Cameroonian musician
- Manu Gavassi (born 1993), Brazilian recording artist, singer, actress
- Manu Guix (born 1979), Spanish composer
- Manu Katché (born 1958), French musician
- Manu Koch (born 1972), Swiss pianist, keyboardist, and composer
- Manu-L (born 1983), Swiss singer and guitarist
- Manu Lanvin (born 1973), French singer
- Manu Limbu, Nepali singer
- Manu Louis, Belgian musician
- Manu Militari (born 1979), Canadian singer
- Manu Manzo (born 1994), American singer-songwriter
- Manu Shrine (1987–2015), Russian electronic musician

=== Sports ===
- Manu (para athlete) (born 1999), Indian Paralympian in shot put F37
- Manú (Portuguese footballer) (born 1982), Portuguese footballer Emanuel Jesus Bonfim Evaristo
- Manu (footballer, born 1984) (born 1984), Spanish footballer
- Manuela Lareo (born 1992), Spanish footballer
- Manu Ahotaeiloa (born 1986), Tongan rugby union player
- Manu Attri (born 1992), Indian badminton player
- Manu Barreiro (born 1986), Spanish association football player
- Manu Balda (born 1992), Ecuadorian footballer
- Manu Bhaker (born 2002), Indian sport shooter
- Manu Bhardwaj (born 1975), Indian cricketer
- Manu Busto (born 1980), Spanish footballer
- Manu Dagher (born 1984), Liberian-Dutch footballer
- Manu Fernández (footballer, born 1986), Spanish football goalkeeper
- Manu Fernández (footballer, born 2001), Spanish football defender
- Manu Ferrera (born 1958), Belgian association football player
- Manu Garba (born 1965), Nigerian association football manager
- Manu Ginóbili (born 1977), Argentine basketball player
- Manu Herrera (born 1981), Spanish footballer
- Manu Hervás (born 1986), Spanish association football player
- Manu Honkanen (born 1996), Finnish ice hockey player
- Manu Lecomte (born 1995), Belgian basketball player
- Manu Leiataua (born 1986), Samoan rugby player
- Manu Maniapoto (1935–2017), New Zealand rugby union player
- Manu Ma'u (born 1988), New Zealand rugby league player
- Manu Molina (born 1991), Spanish footballer
- Manu del Moral (born 1984), Spanish footballer
- Manu Morlanes (born 1999), Spanish association football player
- Manu Nayyar (born 1964), Indian cricketer
- Manu Pal, Indian bowler
- Manu Quijera (born 1998), Spanish javelin thrower
- Manu Rodríguez (basketball) (born 1991), Spanish basketball player
- Manu Rodríguez (footballer) (born 2005), Spanish footballer
- Manu Sánchez (footballer, born 1979), Spanish footballer
- Manu Sánchez (footballer, born 1996), Manuel Sánchez García, Spanish footballer
- Manu Sánchez (footballer, born 2000), Manuel Sánchez de la Peña, Spanish footballer
- Manu Shlomovich (1927–2000), Israeli association football player
- Manu Snellinx (1948–2017), Belgian cyclist
- Manu Sunu (born 1966), Togolese footballer
- Manu Torres (born 1989), Spanish footballer
- Manu Trigueros (born 1991), Spanish footballer
- Manu Tuiasosopo (born 1957), National Football League defensive lineman
- Manu Tuilagi (born 1991), Samoan-born rugby player for England
- Manu Vallejo (born 1997), Spanish footballer
- Manu Vatuvei (born 1986), New Zealand rugby league player
- Manu Vunipola (rugby union, born 1967), Tongan rugby union footballer and coach
- Manu Vunipola (rugby union, born 2000), New Zealand-born English rugby union footballer

=== Other ===
- Afa Anoa'i Jr. (born 1984), American professional wrestler who used the ring name Manu
- Manu (Kannada author) (1951–2011), Kannada author
- Manu Anand, Indian film director and screenwriter
- Manu Ayerdi (born 1967), Basque economist
- Manu Baligar, Indian writer
- Manu Bhandari (1931–2021), Indian author
- Manu Bhattathiri, Indian author
- Manuhuia Bennett, New Zealand bishop
- Manu Beuselinck (born 1970), Belgian politician
- Manu Brabo (born 1981), Spanish photographer
- Manu Chandaria (born 1929), Kenyan businessman
- Manu Chhabria (1946–2002), Indian businessman
- Manu Crooks (born 1993), Ghanaian-Australian artist
- Manu Daftary, American money manager
- Manu V. Devadevan (born 1977), Indian historian
- Manu Diericx (born 1994), Belgian politician
- Manu Farrarons (born 1967), French artist
- Manu Feildel, French-born chef living in Australia
- Manu Fernandes (born 1944), Indian politician
- Manu Herbstein, South African author of Ama, a Story of the Atlantic Slave Trade
- Manu Joseph (born 1974), Indian journalist and writer
- Manu Korovulavula, Fijian political leader and civil servant
- Manu Leumann, German philologist
- Manu Majumdar, Bangladeshi politician
- Manu Manek (died 1996), Indian stock broker
- Manu Manjith (born 1986), Indian lyricist and poet
- Manu Munsi (1924–2009), Indian painter
- Manu Parekh (born 1939), Indian painter
- Manu Patel (born 1962), Indian politician
- Manu S. Pillai (born 1990), Indian historian and author
- Manu Pineda, Spanish politician
- Manu Platt (born 1980), American biomedical engineer
- Manu Pluton (born 1942), French bodybuilder
- Manu Prakash, Indian biophysicist
- Manu Raju (born 1980), American-Indian journalist
- Manu Ramesan, Malayalee film composer
- Manu Sareen (born 1968), Indian social worker
- Manu Sharma (born 1977), Indian criminal
- Manu Singh (born 1983), Indian activist
- Manu Toigo (born 1969), Australian television personality

== As a surname ==
- Elvis Manu (born 1993), Dutch footballer
- Gabriel Manu (born 1981), Romanian footballer
- Gheorghe Manu (1833–1911), Romanian army general and politician
- Ioan Manu (1803–1874), Romanian boyar and politician
- Jacob Manu (born 2003), American football player
- Puiu Manu (born 1928), Romanian graphic designer
