= History of Greek =

Greek is an Indo-European language, the sole surviving descendant of the Hellenic sub-family. Although it split off from other Indo-European languages around the 3rd millennium BCE (or possibly before), it is first attested in the Bronze Age as Mycenaean Greek. During the Archaic and Classical eras, Greek speakers wrote numerous texts in a variety of dialects known collectively as Ancient Greek. In the Hellenistic era, these dialects underwent dialect levelling to form Koine Greek which was used as a lingua franca throughout the eastern Roman Empire, and later grew into Medieval Greek. For much of the period of Modern Greek, the language existed in a situation of diglossia, where speakers would switch between informal varieties known as Dimotiki and a formal one known as Katharevousa. Present-day Modern Standard Greek is largely an outgrowth of Dimotiki, with some features retained from Katharevousa.

== Proto-Greek ==
The Proto-Greek language was the most recent common ancestor of all Greek dialects. Proto-Greek split off from its nearest Indo-European relatives sometime during the European Bronze Age (c. 3rd millennium BC) and possibly even earlier, though it is unknown whether the characteristic Greek sound-changes occurred within the Greek peninsula or if Proto-Greek speakers themselves migrated into Greece.

=== Estimates ===
Estimates for the introduction of the Proto-Greek language into prehistoric Greece have changed over the course of the 20th century. Since the decipherment of Linear B, searches were made "for earlier breaks in the continuity of the material record that might represent the 'coming of the Greeks'". A Middle Bronze Age estimate, originally presented by C. Haley and J. Blegen in 1928, was altered to an estimate spanning the transition from Early Helladic II to Early Helladic III (c. 2400 – c. 2200/2100 BCE). However, the latter estimate, accepted by the majority of scholars, was criticized by John E. Coleman as being based on stratigraphic discontinuities at Lerna that other archaeological excavations in Greece demonstrated were the product of chronological gaps or separate deposit-sequencing instead of cultural changes.

=== Models ===
In modern scholarship, different settlement models have been proposed regarding the development of Proto-Greek speakers in the Greek peninsula.

- Paul Heggarty et al. (2023), advances a mixed steppe-farmer model of Indo-European origins via Bayesian statistics, and places Greek south of the Caucasus as an already diverged branch of Indo-European at around 7000 years before present (ca. 5000 BCE).
- Panayiotis Filos (2014) states that the term Proto-Greek "does not necessarily refer to a fully homogeneous Indo-European language of the (late) Early/Middle Bronze periods (ca. 2200/2000-1700 BCE, but estimates vary)". He argues that Proto-Greek developed "during a long, continuous linguistic process [...], as a migrating population of (soon-to-become) Greek speakers were en route to/on the outskirts of Greece, i.e., somewhere to the north(-west) of the Greek peninsula proper" and amalgamating with Pre-Greek speakers."
- Nancy Demand (2012) argues that speakers of what would become Proto-Greek migrated from their homeland (which could have been northeast of the Black Sea) throughout Europe and reached Greece in a date set around the transition of the Early Bronze Age to the Middle Bronze Age.
- David Anthony (2010) argues that Proto-Greek emerged from the diversification of the Proto-Indo-European language (PIE), the last phase of which gave rise to the later language families having occurred in c. 2500 BCE; its formation in Greece occurred during the beginning and end of the Early Helladic III period (~2200–2000 BC). Specifically, Pre-Proto-Greek, the Indo-European dialect from which Proto-Greek originated, emerged c. 2400 – c. 2200 BCE in an area which bordered pre-Proto-Indo-Iranian to the east and pre-Proto-Armenian and pre-Proto-Phrygian to the west, at the eastern borders of southeastern Europe.
- Asko Parpola and Christian Carpelan (2005) date the arrival of Proto-Greek speakers from the Eurasian steppe into the Greek peninsula to 2200 BCE.
- John E. Coleman (2000) estimates that the entry of Proto-Greek speakers into the Greek peninsula occurred during the late 4th millennium BC (c. 3200 BC) with pre-Greek spoken by the inhabitants of the Late Neolithic II period.
- A. L. Katona (2000) places the beginning of the migration of the Proto-Greek speakers from Ukraine towards the south c. 2400 – c. 2300 BCE. Their proposed route of migration passed through Romania and the eastern Balkans to the Evros river valley from where their main body moved west. As such, Katona, agreeing with M. V. Sakellariou, argues that the main body of Greek-speakers settled in a region that included southwestern Illyria, Epirus, northwestern Thessaly and western Macedonia."
- Thomas V. Gamkrelidze and Vjaceslav V. Ivanov (1995) date the separation of Greek from the Greek-Armenian-Aryan clade of Proto-Indo-European to around the 3rd millennium BCE. The Greek clade afterwards split into independently developed dialects (i.e., eastern: Arcado-Cyprian, Aeolic, Ionic; western: Doric) during the end of the 3rd or beginning of the 2nd millennium BCE.
- Robert Drews (1994) dates the coming of chariot-riding Greeks into the Aegean in c. 1600 BC viewing earlier estimates as "deeply flawed". Drews' model, however, is rejected by modern Mycenologists on the grounds that it is both historically and linguistically inaccurate.
- An older model by Bulgarian linguist Vladimir I. Georgiev (1981) placed Proto-Greek in northwestern Greece and adjacent areas (approximately up to Aulon river to the north including Parauaea, Tymphaia, Athamania, Dolopia, Amphilochia, and Acarnania as well as west and north Thessaly (Histiaeotis, Perrhaibia, Tripolis) and Pieria in Macedonia during the Late Neolithic period. However, the dating of Proto-Greek in Bronze Age Greece is compatible with the inherited lexicon from the common Proto-Indo-European language which excludes any possibility of it being present in Neolithic Greece.
Proto-Greek area of settlement (2200/2100–1900 BC) suggested by Katona (2000), Sakellariou (2016, 1980, 1975) and Phylaktopoulos (1975).

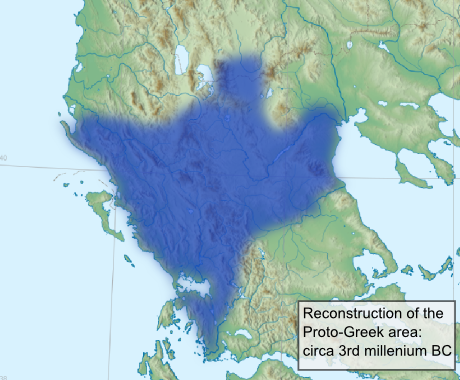
View of "Proto-Greek area" in the 3rd millennium BCE, reconstructed by Vladimir I. Georgiev (1973 and 1981). The boundaries are based on the high concentration of archaic Greek place-names in the region in contrast to southern Greece which preserves many pre-Greek ones.

=== Diversification ===
Ivo Hajnal dates the beginning of the diversification of Proto-Greek into the subsequent Greek dialects to a point not significantly earlier than 1700 BC. The conventional division of the Greek dialects prior of 1955 differentiated them between a West Greek (consisting of Doric and Northwest Greek) and an East Greek (consisting of Aeolic, Arcado-Cypriot, and Attic-Ionic) group. However, after the decipherment of the Linear B script, Walter Porzig and Ernst Risch argued for a division between a Northern (consisting of Doric, Northwest Greek, and Aeolic) and a Southern (consisting of Mycenaean, Arcado-Cypriot, and Attic-Ionic) group, which remains fundamental through today.

== Mycenaean Greek ==
Map of Greece as described in Homer's Iliad. The geographical data is believed to refer primarily to Bronze Age Greece, when Mycenaean Greek would have been spoken, and so can be used as an estimator of the range.

The first known script for writing Greek was the Linear B syllabary, used for the archaic Mycenaean dialect. Linear B was not deciphered until 1952. After the fall of the Mycenaean civilization during the Bronze Age collapse, there was a period of about five hundred years when writing was either not used or nothing has survived to the present day. Since early classical times, Greek has been written in the Greek alphabet.

== Ancient Greek dialects ==
Distribution of Greek dialects in the classical period

In the archaic and classical periods, there were three main dialects of the Greek language: Aeolic, Ionic, and Doric, corresponding to the three main tribes of the Greeks, the Aeolians (chiefly living in the islands of the Aegean and the west coast of Asia Minor north of Smyrna), the Ionians (mostly settled in the west coast of Asia Minor, including Smyrna and the area to the south of it), and the Dorians (primarily the Greeks of the coast of the Pelopennesus, for example, of Sparta, Crete and the southernmost parts of the west coast of Asia Minor). Homer's Iliad and Odyssey were written in a kind of literary Ionic with some loan words from the other dialects. Ionic, therefore, became the primary literary language of ancient Greece until the ascendancy of Athens in the late 5th century. Doric was standard for Greek lyric poetry, such as Pindar and the choral odes of the Greek tragedians.

=== Attic Greek ===
Attic Greek, a subdialect of Ionic, was for centuries the language of Athens. Most surviving classical Greek literature appears in Attic Greek, including the extant texts of Plato and Aristotle, which were passed down in written form from classical times.

== Koine Greek ==
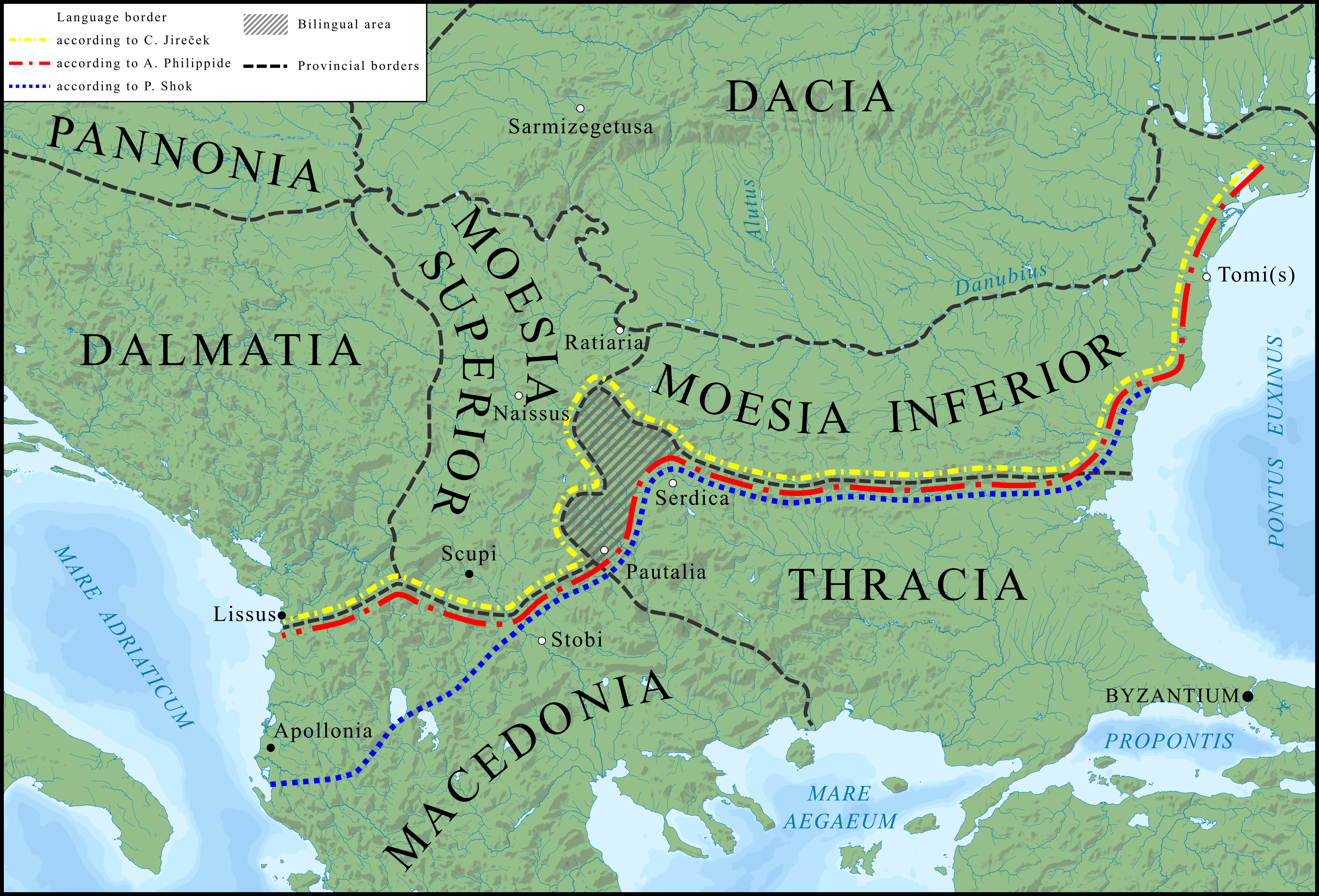
The language border between Latin- and Greek-influenced regions of the Roman Empire according to various linguists

For centuries, the Greek language had existed in multiple dialects. As Greek culture under Alexander the Great (356–323 BC) and his successors spread from Asia Minor to Egypt and the border regions of India the Attic dialect became the basis of the Koiné (Κοινή; "common"). The language was also learned by the inhabitants of the regions that Alexander conquered, turning Greek into a world language. The Greek language continued to thrive after Alexander, during the Hellenistic period (323 BC to 31 BC). During this period the Septuagint, a Greek translation of the Hebrew Bible, appeared. For many centuries Koine Greek was the lingua franca of the eastern half of the Roman Empire. It was during Roman times that the Greek New Testament appeared, and Koiné Greek is also called "New Testament Greek" after its most famous work of literature.

== Medieval Greek ==
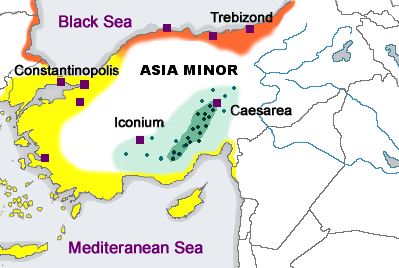
Distribution of Greek dialects in Asia Minor after the fall of the Byzantine Empire. Demotic in yellow. Pontic in orange. Cappadocian Greek in green.

Medieval Greek, also known as Byzantine Greek, is the stage of the Greek language between the beginning of the Middle Ages around 600 and the Ottoman conquest of the city of Constantinople in 1453. The latter date marked the end of the Middle Ages in Southeast Europe. From 620 onwards, Greek was the only language of administration and government in the Byzantine Empire, due to the reforms of Heraclius. This stage of language is thus described as Byzantine Greek. The study of the Medieval Greek language and literature is a branch of Byzantine Studies, or Byzantinology, the study of the history and culture of the Byzantine Empire.

The beginning of Medieval Greek is occasionally dated back to as early as the 4th century, either to 330, when the political centre of the monarchy was moved to Constantinople, or to 395, the division of the Empire. However, this approach is rather arbitrary as it is more an assumption of political as opposed to cultural and linguistic developments. It is only after the Eastern Roman-Byzantine culture was subjected to such massive change in the 7th century that a turning point in language development can be assumed. Medieval Greek is the link between the ancient and modern forms of the language because on the one hand, its literature is still strongly influenced by Ancient Greek, while on the other hand, many linguistic features of Modern Greek were already taking shape in the spoken language.

== Modern Greek ==
The distribution of major modern Greek dialect areas

The beginning of the "modern" period of the language is often symbolically assigned to the fall of the Byzantine Empire in 1453, even though that date marks no clear linguistic boundary and many characteristic modern features of the language had already been present centuries earlier, from the 4th to the 15th century. During most of the period, the language existed in a situation of diglossia, with regional spoken dialects existing side by side with learned, archaic written forms.

After the establishment of Greece as an independent state in 1829, the Katharévusa (Καθαρεύουσα) form – Greek for "purified language" – was sanctioned as the official language of the state and the only acceptable form of Greek in Greece. The whole attempt led to a linguistic war, along with the creation of literary factions: the Dhimotikistés (Δημοτικιστές), who supported the common (Demotic) dialect, and the Lóyii (Λόγιοι), or Katharevusyáni (Καθαρευουσιάνοι), who supported the "purified dialect". Up to that point, use of Dhimotikí in state affairs was generally frowned upon. Use of the Demotic dialect in state speech and paperwork was forbidden.

The fall of the Junta of 1974 and the end of the era of Metapolítefsi 1974–1976 brought the acceptance of the Demotic dialect as both the de facto and de jure forms of the language for use by the Greek government, though the Katharevousa movement has left marks in the language.

Today, standard modern Greek, based on Demotic, is the official language of both Greece and Cyprus. Greek is spoken today by approximately 12–15 million people, mainly in Greece and Cyprus, but also by minority and immigrant communities in many other countries.

== See also ==
- History of the Latin language
