= Proto-Greek language =

Common ancestor of all varieties of Greek

Proto-Greek
- Proto-Hellenic
- Reconstruction of: Hellenic languages / Ancient Greek dialects
- Region: Southern Balkan Peninsula
- Era: c. 2200–1900 BC (appearance in the Greek peninsula); c. 1700 BC (diversification)
- Reconstructed ancestor: Proto-Indo-European

The Proto-Greek language, also known as Proto-Hellenic, is the Indo-European language which was the last common ancestor of all varieties of Greek, including Mycenaean Greek, the subsequent ancient Greek dialects (i.e., Attic, Ionic, Aeolic, Doric proper, Arcadocypriot, Northwest Greek, ancient Macedonian—either a dialect or a closely related Hellenic language) and, ultimately, Koine, Byzantine and Modern Greek (along with its variants). Proto-Greek speakers entered Greece sometime during the European Bronze Age (c. 2200–1900 BC) with the diversification into a southern and a northern group beginning by approximately 1700 BC.

== Origins ==
=== Context ===
The evolution of Proto-Greek could be considered within the context of an early Paleo-Balkan sprachbund that makes it difficult to delineate exact boundaries between individual languages. The characteristically Greek representation of word-initial laryngeals by prothetic vowels is shared, for one, by the Armenian language, which also seems to share some other phonological and morphological peculiarities of Greek; this has led some linguists to propose a hypothetically closer relationship between Greek and Armenian, although evidence remains scant.

=== Estimates ===
Estimates for the introduction of the Proto-Greek language into prehistoric Greece have changed over the course of the 20th century. Since the decipherment of Linear B, searches were made "for earlier breaks in the continuity of the material record that might represent the 'coming of the Greeks'". A Middle Bronze Age estimate, originally presented by C. Haley and J. Blegen in 1928, was altered to an estimate spanning the transition from Early Helladic II to Early Helladic III (c. 2400 – c. 2200/2100 BCE). However, the latter estimate, accepted by the majority of scholars, was criticized by John E. Coleman as being based on stratigraphic discontinuities at Lerna that other archaeological excavations in Greece demonstrated were the product of chronological gaps or separate deposit-sequencing instead of cultural changes.

=== Models ===
In modern scholarship, different settlement models have been proposed regarding the development of Proto-Greek speakers in the Greek peninsula.

- Paul Heggarty et al. (2023), advancing a mixed steppe-farmer model of Indo-European origins via Bayesian statistics, places Greek south of the Caucasus as an already diverged branch of Indo-European at around 7000 years before present (c. 5000 BCE). Heggarty's hybrid model was critiqued by Kassian and Starostin (2025).
- Panayiotis Filos (2014) states that the term Proto-Greek "does not necessarily refer to a fully homogeneous Indo-European language of the (late) Early/Middle Bronze periods (ca. 2200/2000-1700 BCE, but estimates vary)". He argues that Proto-Greek developed "during a long, continuous linguistic process [...], as a migrating population of (soon-to-become) Greek speakers were en route to/on the outskirts of Greece, i.e., somewhere to the north(-west) of the Greek peninsula proper" and amalgamating with Pre-Greek speakers."
- Radoslav Katičić (2012|1976) states that the lack of any traces of pre-Greek toponymy in Epirus and western Thessaly makes the region the most probable concentration site of Greek-speakers at around c. 1950 BC before their descent southwards.
- Nancy Demand (2012) argues that speakers of what would become Proto-Greek migrated from their homeland (which could have been northeast of the Black Sea) throughout Europe and reached Greece in a date set around the transition of the Early Bronze Age to the Middle Bronze Age.
- David Anthony (2010) argues that Proto-Greek emerged from the diversification of the Proto-Indo-European language (PIE), the last phase of which gave rise to the later language families having occurred in c. 2500 BCE; its formation in Greece occurred during the beginning and end of the Early Helladic III period (~2200–2000 BC). Specifically, Pre-Proto-Greek, the Indo-European dialect from which Proto-Greek originated, emerged c. 2400 – c. 2200 BCE in an area which bordered pre-Proto-Indo-Iranian to the east and pre-Proto-Armenian and pre-Proto-Phrygian to the west, at the eastern borders of southeastern Europe.
- Asko Parpola and Christian Carpelan (2005) date the arrival of Proto-Greek speakers from the Eurasian steppe into the Greek peninsula to 2200 BCE.
- John E. Coleman (2000) estimates that the entry of Proto-Greek speakers into the Greek peninsula occurred during the late 4th millennium BC (c. 3200 BC) with pre-Greek spoken by the inhabitants of the Late Neolithic II period.
- A. L. Katona (2000) places the beginning of the migration of the Proto-Greek speakers from Ukraine towards the south c. 2400 – c. 2300 BCE. Their proposed route of migration passed through Romania and the eastern Balkans to the Evros river valley from where their main body moved west. As such, Katona, agreeing with M. V. Sakellariou, argues that the main body of Greek-speakers settled in a region that included southwestern Illyria, Epirus, northwestern Thessaly and western Macedonia."
- Thomas V. Gamkrelidze and Vjaceslav V. Ivanov (1995) date the separation of Greek from the Greek-Armenian-Aryan clade of Proto-Indo-European to around the 3rd millennium BCE. The Greek clade afterwards split into independently developed dialects (i.e., eastern: Arcado-Cyprian, Aeolic, Ionic; western: Doric) during the end of the 3rd or beginning of the 2nd millennium BCE.
- Robert Drews (1994) dates the coming of chariot-riding Greeks into the Aegean in c. 1600 BC viewing earlier estimates as "deeply flawed". Drews' model, however, is rejected by modern Mycenologists on the grounds that it is both historically and linguistically inaccurate.
- An older model by Bulgarian linguist Vladimir I. Georgiev (1981) placed Proto-Greek in northwestern Greece and adjacent areas (approximately up to Aulon river to the north including Parauaea, Tymphaia, Athamania, Dolopia, Amphilochia, and Acarnania as well as west and north Thessaly (Histiaeotis, Perrhaibia, Tripolis) and Pieria in Macedonia during the Late Neolithic period. The boundaries are based on the high concentration of archaic Greek place-names in the region, in contrast to southern Greece which preserves many pre-Greek place-names. However, the dating of Proto-Greek in Bronze Age Greece is compatible with the inherited lexicon from the common Proto-Indo-European language which excludes any possibility of it being present in Neolithic Greece.
Hypothetical Proto-Greek area of settlement (2200/2100–1900 BC) suggested by Katona (2000), Sakellariou (2016, 1980, 1975) and Phylaktopoulos (1975).

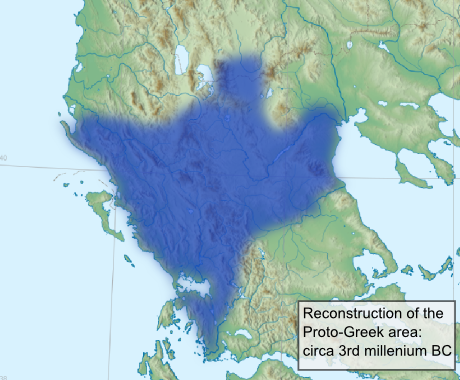
View of "Proto-Greek area" in the 3rd millennium BCE, reconstructed by Vladimir I. Georgiev (1973 and 1981). The boundaries are based on the high concentration of archaic Greek place-names in the region in contrast to southern Greece which preserves many pre-Greek ones.

== Diversification ==
Ivo Hajnal dates the beginning of the diversification of Proto-Greek into the subsequent Greek dialects to a point not significantly earlier than 1700 BC. The conventional division of the Greek dialects prior to 1955 differentiated them between a West Greek (consisting of Doric and Northwest Greek) and an East Greek (consisting of Aeolic, Arcado-Cypriot, and Attic-Ionic) group. However, after the decipherment of the Linear B script, Walter Porzig and Ernst Risch argued for a division between a Northern (consisting of Doric, Northwest Greek, and Aeolic) and a Southern (consisting of Mycenaean, Arcado-Cypriot, and Attic-Ionic) group, which remains fundamental until today.

In Lucien van Beek's diversification scenario, South Greek-speaking tribes in c. 1700 BC spread to Boeotia, Attica, and the Peloponnese, while North Greek was spoken in Epirus, Thessaly, parts of Central Greece, and perhaps also Macedonia.

For Christina Skelton, "[t]he state of the Greek dialects in the second millennium BCE is still controversial."

== Phonology ==
=== Phonemes ===
Proto-Greek is reconstructed with the following phonemes:

==== Consonants ====
Type	Labial	Alveolar	Palatal	Velar	Labiovelar	Glottal
Nasal	m [m]	n [n]	ň [ɲ] (Note: Occurs geminated only as the result of palatalization ČČ < Cy; t͏̌ also occurs in the combination pt͏̌ < py)			
Plosive	p [p] b [b] pʰ [pʰ]	t [t] d [d] tʰ [tʰ]	t͏̌ [c] d͏̌ [ɟ]	k [k] g [ɡ] kʰ [kʰ]	kʷ [kʷ] gʷ [ɡʷ] kʷʰ [kʷʰ]	
Affricate		ts [ts] (Note: Exact phonetic value uncertain) dz [dz]				
Fricative		s [s]				h [h]
Liquid		l [l] r [r]	l͏̌ [ʎ] ř [rʲ]			
Semivowel			y [j]		w [w]	

==== Vowels ====
Type	Front	Center	Back
Close	i [i] ī [iː]		u [u] ū [uː]
Mid	e [e] ē	ə [ə]	o [o] ō
Open		a [a] ā [aː]	

- Diphthongs are ai ei oi ui, au eu ou, āi ēi ōi, and possibly āu ēu ōu; all are allophonic with the corresponding sequences of vowel and semivowel.
- Exactly one vowel in each word bears a pitch accent (equivalent to the Attic Greek acute accent).

=== Proto-Greek changes ===
The primary sound changes separating Proto-Greek from the Proto-Indo-European language include the following.

==== Consonants ====
- Delabialization of labiovelars next to /u/, the "boukólos rule". This was a phonotactic restriction already in Proto-Indo-European, and continued to be productive in Proto-Greek. It ceased to be in effect when labiovelars disappeared from the language in post-Proto-Greek.
- Centumization: Merger of palatovelars and velars.
- Merging of sequences of velar + *w into the labiovelars, perhaps with compensatory lengthening of the consonant in one case: PIE *h₁éḱwos > PG *híkkʷos > Mycenaean i-qo /híkkʷos/, Attic híppos, Aeolic íkkos.
- Debuccalization of /s/ to /h/ in intervocalic and prevocalic positions (between two vowels, or if word-initial and followed by a vowel). Loss of prevocalic *s was not completed entirely, evidenced by sȳ́s ~ hȳ́s "pig" (from PIE *suh₁-), dasýs "dense" and dásos "dense growth, forest"; *som "with" is another example, contaminated with PIE *ḱom (Latin cum; preserved in Greek kaí, katá, koinós) to Mycenaean ku-su /ksun/, Homeric and Old Attic ksýn, later sýn. Furthermore, sélas "light in the sky, as in the aurora" and selḗnē/selā́nā "moon" may be more examples of the same if it derived from PIE *swel- "to burn" (possibly related to hḗlios "sun", Ionic hēélios < *sāwélios).
- Strengthening of word-initial y- to dy- > dz- (note that Hy- > Vy- regularly due to vocalization of laryngeals).
- Two dentals next to each other become *st.
- Filos argues for a "probable" early loss of final non-nasal stop consonants: compare Latin quid and Sanskrit cid with Greek ti; however, Mycenaean texts are inconclusive in offering evidence on this matter, as the Linear B script did not explicitly mark final consonants. However, it appears that these stops were preserved word finally for unstressed words, reflected in ek "out of".
- Final /m/ > /n/.
- Initial /mC/ > /bC/.
- Syllabic resonants *m̥, *n̥, *l̥ and *r̥ that are not followed by a laryngeal are resolved to vowels or combinations of a vowel and consonantal resonant. This resulted in an epenthetic vowel of undetermined quality (denoted here as *ə). This vowel then usually developed into a but also o in some cases. Thus:
  - *m̥, *n̥ > *ə, but > *əm, *ən before a sonorant. *ə appears as o in Mycenaean after a labial: pe-mo (spérmo) "seed" vs. usual spérma < *spérmn̥. Similarly, o often appears in Arcadian after a velar, e.g. déko "ten", hekotón "one hundred" vs. usual déka, hekatón < *déḱm̥, *sem-ḱm̥tóm.
  - *l̥, *r̥ > *lə, *rə, but *əl, *ər before sonorants and analogously. *ə appears as o in Mycenaean, Aeolic and Arcadocypriot. Example: PIE *str̥-tos > usual stratós, Aeolic strótos "army"; post-PIE *ḱr̥di-eh₂ "heart" > Attic kardíā, Homeric kradíē, Pamphylian korzdia.

===== Changes to the aspirates =====
Major changes included:

- Devoicing of voiced aspirates *bʰ, *dʰ, *ɡʰ, *ɡʷʰ to *pʰ, *tʰ, *kʰ, *kʷʰ. This change preceded and fed both stages of palatalization.
- Loss of aspiration before *s, e.g. heksō "I will have" < Post-PIE *seǵʰ-s-oh₂.
- Loss of aspiration before *y, detailed under "palatalization".

Grassmann's law was a process of dissimilation in words containing multiple aspirates. It caused an initial aspirated sound to lose its aspiration when a following aspirated consonant occurred in the same word. It was a relatively late change in Proto-Greek history, and must have occurred independently of the similar dissimilation of aspirates (also known as Grassmann's law) in Indo-Iranian, although it may represent a common areal feature; the change may have even been post-Mycenaean.

1. It postdates the Greek-specific de-voicing of voiced aspirates.
2. It postdates the change of /s/ > /h/, which is then lost in the same environment: ékhō "I have" < *hekh- < PIE *seǵʰ-oh₂, but future heksō "I will have" < *heks- < Post-PIE *seǵʰ-s-oh₂.
3. It postdates even the loss of aspiration before *y that accompanied second-stage palatalization (see below), which postdates both of the previous changes (as well as first-stage palatalization).
4. On the other hand, it predates the development of the first aorist passive marker -thē- since the aspirate in that marker has no effect on preceding aspirates.

===== Laryngeal changes =====
Greek is unique among Indo-European languages in reflecting the three different laryngeals with distinct vowels. Most Indo-European languages can be traced back to a dialectal variety of late Proto-Indo-European (PIE) in which all three laryngeals had merged (after colouring adjacent short /e/ vowels), but Greek clearly cannot. For that reason, Greek is extremely important in reconstructing PIE forms.

Greek shows distinct reflexes of the laryngeals in various positions:

- Most famously, between consonants, where original vocalic *h₁, *h₂, *h₃ are reflected as /e/, /a/, /o/ respectively (the so-called triple reflex). All other Indo-European languages reflect the same vowel from all three laryngeals (usually /a/, but /i/ or other vowels in Indo-Iranian):

Proto-Indo-European	Greek	Vedic Sanskrit	Latin
*dʰh₁s "sacred, religious"	θέσφατος (thésphatos) "decreed by God"	धिष्ण्य (dhíṣṇya-) "devout"	fānum "temple" < *fasnom < *dʰh̥₁s-no-
*sth₂-to- "standing, being made to stand"	στατός (statós)	स्थित (sthíta-)	status
*dh₃-ti- "gift"	δόσις (dósis)	दिति (díti-)	datiō

- An initial laryngeal before a consonant (a *HC- sequence) leads to the same triple reflex, but most IE languages lost such laryngeals and a few reflect them initially before consonants. Greek vocalized them (leading to what are misleadingly termed prothetic vowels): Greek érebos "darkness" < PIE *h₁regʷos vs. Gothic riqiz- "darkness"; Greek áent- "wind" < *awent- < PIE *h₂wéh₁n̥t- vs. English wind, Latin ventus "wind", Breton gwent "wind".
- The sequence *CRHC (C = consonant, R = resonant, H = laryngeal) becomes CRēC, CRāC, CRōC from H = *h₁, *h₂, *h₃ respectively. (Other Indo-European languages again have the same reflex for all three laryngeals: *CuRC in Proto-Germanic, *CiRˀC/CuRˀC with acute register in Proto-Balto-Slavic, *CRHC (with merger of the laryngeals) in Proto-Indo-Iranian, *CRāC in Proto-Italic and Proto-Celtic.) Sometimes, CeReC, CaRaC, CoRoC are found instead: Greek thánatos "death" vs. Doric Greek thnātós "mortal", both apparently reflecting *dʰn̥h₂-tos. It is sometimes suggested that the position of the accent was a factor in determining the outcome.
- The sequence *CiHC tends to become *CyēC, *CyāC, *CyōC from H = *h₁, *h₂, *h₃ respectively, with later palatalization (see below). Sometimes, the outcome CīC is found, as in most other Indo-European languages, or the outcome CiaC in the case of *Cih₂C.

All of the cases may stem from an early insertion of /e/ next to a laryngeal not adjacent to a vowel in the Indo-European dialect ancestral to Greek (subsequently coloured to /e/, /a/, /o/ by the particular laryngeal in question) prior to the general merger of laryngeals:

- *CHC > *CHeC > CeC/CaC/CoC.
- *HC- > *HeC- > eC-/aC-/oC-.
- *CRHC > *CReHC > CRēC/CRāC/CRōC; or, *CRHC > *CeRHeC > *CeReC/CeRaC/CeRoC > CeReC/CaRaC/CoRoC by assimilation.
- *CiHC > *CyeHC > CyēC/CyāC/CyōC; or, *Cih₂C > *Cih₂eC > *CiHaC > *CiyaC > CiaC; or, *CiHC remains without vowel insertion > CīC.

A laryngeal adjacent to a vowel develops along the same lines as other Indo-European languages:

- The sequence *CRHV (C = consonant, R = resonant, H = laryngeal, V = vowel) passes through *CR̥HV, becoming CaRV.
- The sequence *CeHC becomes CēC/CāC/CōC.
- The sequence *CoHC becomes CōC.
- In the sequence *CHV (including CHR̥C, with a vocalized resonant), the laryngeal colours a following short /e/, as expected, but it otherwise disappears entirely (as in most other Indo-European languages but not Indo-Iranian whose laryngeal aspirates a previous stop and prevents the operation of Brugmann's law).
- In a *VHV sequence (a laryngeal between vowels, including a vocalic resonant R̥), the laryngeal again colours any adjacent short /e/ but otherwise vanishes early on. That change appears to be uniform across the Indo-European languages and was probably the first environment in which laryngeals were lost. If the first V was *i, *u or a vocalic resonant, a consonantal copy was apparently inserted in place of the laryngeal: *CiHV > *CiyV, *CuHV > *CuwV, *CR̥HV possibly > *CR̥RV, with R̥ always remaining as vocalic until the dissolution of vocalic resonants in the various daughter languages. Otherwise, a hiatus resulted, which was resolved in various ways in the daughter languages, typically by converting i, u and vocalic resonants, when it directly followed a vowel, back into a consonant and merging adjacent non-high vowels into a single long vowel.

===== Palatalization =====
Consonants followed by consonantal *y were palatalized, producing various affricate consonants (still represented as a separate sound in Mycenaean) and geminated palatal consonants. Any aspiration was lost in the process. The palatalized consonants later simplified, mostly losing their palatal character. Palatalization occurred in two separate stages. The first stage affected only dental consonants, and the second stage affected all consonants.

====== First palatalization ======
The first palatalization replaced post-PIE sequences of dental stop + *y with alveolar affricates:

Before	After
*ty, *tʰy	*t͡s
*dy	*d͡z

The affricate derived from the first palatalization of *ty and *tʰy merged with the outcome of the inherited clusters *ts, *ds and *tʰs, all becoming *t͡s.

====== Restoration ======
After the first palatalization changed *ty and *tʰy into *t͡s, the consonant *y was restored after original *t or *tʰ in morphologically transparent formations. The initial outcome of restoration may have been simply *ty and *tʰy, or alternatively, restoration may have yielded an affricate followed by a glide, *t͡sy, in the case of both original *t and original *tʰ. Either way, restored *t(ʰ)y would go on to merge via the second palatalization with the reflex of *k(ʰ)y, resulting in a distinct outcome from the *t͡s derived from the first palatalization. There may also have been restoration of *y after original *d in the same circumstances, but if so, it apparently merged with the *d͡z that resulted from the first palatalization before leaving any visible trace.

However, restoration is not evident in Mycenaean Greek, where the reflex of original *t(ʰ)y (which became a consonant transcribed as ⟨s⟩) is consistently written differently from the reflex of original *k(ʰ)y (which became a consonant transcribed as ⟨z⟩ via the second palatalization).

====== Second palatalization ======
The second palatalization took place following the resolution of syllabic laryngeals and sonorants, and prior to Grassmann's law. It affected all consonants followed by the palatal glide *y. The following table, based on American linguist Andrew Sihler, shows the outcomes of the second palatalization:

Before (post-PIE)	After
*py, *pʰy	*pt͏̌
*ty, *tʰy (or *t͡sy)	*t͏̌t͏̌
*ky, *kʰy	*t͏̌t͏̌
*kʷy, *kʷʰy	*t͏̌t͏̌
(*d͡zy)	*d͏̌d͏̌
*gy	*d͏̌d͏̌
*gʷy	*d͏̌d͏̌
*ly	*l͏̌l͏̌
*my, *ny	*ňň
*ry	*řř
*sy > *hy	*yy
*wy	*ɥɥ > *yy

Sihler reconstructs the palatalized stops (shown in the above table as *t͏̌ *d͏̌) with a degree of assibilation and transcribes them as *č *ǰ.

The resulting palatal consonants and clusters of Proto-Greek were resolved in varying ways prior to the historical period.

Proto-Greek		Homeric	Attic	West Ionic	Other Ionic	Boeotian, Cretan	Arcadian	Cypriot	Lesbian, Thessalian	Other
*pt͏̌		pt								
*t͡s	final, initial, after *n, after long vowel or diphthong	s								
*t͡s	after short vowel	s, ss	s			tt	s		ss	
*t͏̌t͏̌	medial intervocalic	ss	tt		ss	tt	ss			
*d͡z, *d͏̌d͏̌		zd				dd	zd			
*l͏̌l͏̌		ll						i̯l	ll	
*ňň	after α, ο	i̯n						unattested	i̯n	
*ňň	after ε, ι, υ	ːn						unattested	nn	ːn
*řř	after α, ο	i̯r								
*řř	after ε, ι, υ	ːr						unattested	rr	ːr
*yy		i̯								

The restoration of *y after original *t or *tʰ (resulting in *t͏̌t͏̌) occurred only in morphologically transparent formations, by analogy with similar formations in which *y was preceded by other consonants. In formations that were morphologically opaque, the restoration did not take place and the *t͡s that resulted from the first palatalization of *ty and *tʰy remained. Hence, depending on the type of formation, the pre-Proto-Greek sequences *ty and *tʰy have different outcomes in the later languages. In particular, medial *t(ʰ)y becomes Attic -s- in opaque formations but -tt- in transparent formations.

The outcome of PG medial *ts in Homeric Greek is s after a long vowel, and vacillation between s and ss after a short vowel: tátēsi dat. pl. "rug" < tátēt-, possí(n)/posí(n) dat. pl. "foot" < pod-. This was useful for the composer of the Iliad and Odyssey, since possí with double s scans as long-short, while posí with single s scans as short-short. Thus the writer could use each form in different positions in a line.

Examples of initial *t͡s:

- PIE *tyegʷ- "avoid" > PG *t͡segʷ- > Greek sébomai "worship, be respectful" (Ved. tyaj- "flee")
- PIE *dʰyeh₂- "notice" > PG *t͡sā- > Dor. sā́ma, Att. sêma "sign" (Ved. dhyā́- "thought, contemplation")

Examples of medial *t͡s (morphologically opaque forms, first palatalization only):

- PreG *tótyos "as much" > PG *tót͡sos > Att. tósos, Hom. tósos/tóssos (cf. Ved. táti, Lat. tot "so much/many")
- PIE *médʰyos "middle" > PG *mét͡sos > Att. mésos, Hom. mésos/méssos, Boeot. méttos, other dial. mésos (cf. Ved. mádhya-, Lat. medius)

Examples of medial *t͏̌t͏̌ (morphologically transparent forms, first and second palatalization):

- PIE *h₁erh₁-t-yoh₂ "I row" > PG *erét͏̌t͏̌ō > Attic eréttō, usual non-Attic eréssō (cf. erétēs "oarsman")
- PIE *krét-yōs > PreG *krétyōn "better" > PG *krét͏̌t͏̌ōn > Attic kreíttōn, usual non-Attic kréssōn (cf. kratús "strong" < PIE *kr̥tús)

For comparison, examples of initial *t͏̌ from *k(ʰ)y by the second palatalization:

- PreG *ki-āmerom > PG *t͏̌āmeron > Attic tḗmeron, Ionic sḗmeron, Doric sā́meron
- PreG *kyā-wetes > Attic têtes, Ionic sêtes, Mycenaean za-we-te

For words with original *dy, no distinction is found in any historically attested form of Greek between the outcomes of the first and second palatalizations, and so there is no visible evidence of an opposition between *d͡z and a secondary restored cluster *d͡zy > *d͏̌d͏̌. However, it is reasonable to think that words with *dy originally underwent parallel treatment to words with original *ty and *tʰy. The reflex of *dy also merged with the reflex of *g(ʷ)y, with one of the two word-initial reflexes of PIE *y-, and with original *sd, as in PIE *h₃esdos/osdos > όζος 'branch' or PIE *si-sd- > ἵζω 'take a seat'. The merger with *sd was probably post-Mycenaean, but occurred before the introduction of the Greek alphabet.

==== Vowels ====
- Osthoff's law: Shortening of long vowels before a sonorant in the same syllable. E.g. *dyēws, "skyling, sky god" > Attic Greek Zeús /dzeús/.
- Cowgill's law: Raising of /o/ to /u/ between a resonant and a labial.

===== Cowgill's law =====
In Proto-Greek, Cowgill's law states that a former /o/ vowel becomes /u/ between a resonant (/r/, /l/, /m/, /n/) and a labial consonant (including labiovelars), in either order. Examples include:

- Greek: νύξ, "night" < PIE *nokʷts (cf. Latin: nox, Ved. nák < *nakts, Gothic: nahts, gen. sg. Hittite: nekuz /nekʷts/)
- Greek: φύλλον, "leaf" < PIE *bʰolyom (cf. Latin: folium)
- Greek: μύλη, "mill" < PIE *mol-eh₂- (cf. Latin: molīna)
- Greek: ὄνυξ, "nail" (stem Greek: ónukh-) < early PG *onokʷʰ- < PIE h₃nogʷʰ- (cf. Old English: nægl < PGerm *nag-laz)

Note that when a labiovelar adjoins an /o/ affected by Cowgill's law, the new /u/ will cause the labiovelar to lose its labial component (as in Greek: núks and Greek: ónuks/ónukh-, where the usual Greek change */kʷ/ > /p/ has not occurred).

==== Prosody ====
Proto-Greek retained the Indo-European pitch accent, but developed a number of rules governing it:

- The law of limitation, also known as the trisyllabicity law, confined the freedom of the accents to the final three syllables. Alternatively, it can be analyzed as restraining the accent to be within the last four morae of the word.
- Wheeler's law, which causes oxytone words to become paroxytone when ending in a syllable sequence consisting of heavy-light-light (ex. *poikilós > poikílos).
- Loss of accent in finite verb forms. This probably began in verbs of independent clauses, a development also seen in Vedic Sanskrit, where they behave as clitics and bear no accent. The accentless forms later acquired a default recessive accent, placed as far left as the law of limitation allowed.
  - Certain imperative forms, such as idé "see!", regularly escaped this process and retained their accent.
- Many Proto-Greek suffixes bore lexical stress. Accentuation rules applied post-Proto-Greek such as Vendryes's law and Bartoli's law modified how and if this would surface.

=== Post-Proto-Greek changes ===
Sound changes that postdate Proto-Greek, but predate the attested dialects, including Mycenaean Greek, include:

- Loss of s in consonant clusters, with compensatory lengthening of the preceding vowel (Attic, Ionic, Doric) or of the consonant (Aeolic): *ésmi "I am" > ḗmi, eîmi or émmi.
- Creation of secondary s from earlier affricates, *nty > *nts > ns. This was, in turn, followed by a change similar to the one described above, loss of the n with compensatory lengthening: *apónt-ya > apónsa > apoûsa, "absent", feminine.
- In southern dialects (including Mycenaean, but not Doric), -ti- > -si- (assibilation).

The following changes are apparently post-Mycenaean because early stages are represented in Linear B:

- Loss of /h/ (from original /s/), except initially, e.g. Doric níkaas "having conquered" < *níkahas < *níkasas.
- Loss of /j/, e.g. treîs "three" < *tréyes.
- Loss of /w/ in many dialects (later than loss of /h/ and /j/). Example: étos "year" from *wétos.
- Loss of labiovelars, which were converted (mostly) into labials, sometimes into dentals (or velars next to /u/, as a result of an earlier sound change). See below for details. It had not yet happened in Mycenaean, as is shown by the fact that a separate letter ⟨q⟩ is used for such sounds.
- Contraction of adjacent vowels resulting from loss of /h/ and /j/ (and, to a lesser extent, from loss of /w/); more in Attic Greek than elsewhere.
- Rise of a distinctive circumflex accent, resulting from contraction and certain other changes.
- Loss of /n/ before /s/ (incompletely in Cretan Greek), with compensatory lengthening of the preceding vowel.
- Raising of ā to ē /ɛː/ in Attic and Ionic dialects (but not Doric). In Ionic, the change was general, but in Attic it did not occur after /i/, /e/ or /r/. (Note Attic kórē "girl" < *kórwā; loss of /w/ after /r/ had not occurred at that point in Attic.)
- Vendryes's Law in Attic, where a penultimate circumflex accent was retracted onto a preceding light syllable if the final syllable was also light: light-circumflex-light > acute-heavy-light. For example, hetoîmos > Attic hétoimos.
- Analogical prosodic changes that converted a penultimate heavy acute accent to circumflex (retraction by one mora) if both the final and (if present) the preceding syllable were light. This produced alternations within a paradigm, for example Attic oînos "wine" nominative singular, but genitive singular oínou.

Note that /w/ and /j/, when following a vowel and not preceding a vowel, combined early on with the vowel to form a diphthong and so were not lost.

Loss of /h/ and /w/ after a consonant was often accompanied by compensatory lengthening of a preceding vowel.

The development of labiovelars varies from dialect to dialect:

- Due to the PIE boukólos rule, labiovelars next to /u/ had already been converted to plain velars: boukólos "herdsman" < *gʷou-kʷólos (cf. boûs "cow" < *gʷou-) vs. aipólos "goatherd" < *ai(g)-kʷólos (cf. aíks, gen. aigós "goat"); elakhús "small" < *h₁ln̥gʷʰ-ús vs. elaphrós "light" < *h₁ln̥gʷʰ-rós.
- In Attic and some other dialects (but not, for example, Aeolic), labiovelars before some front vowels became dentals. In Attic, kʷ and kʷʰ became t and th, respectively, before /e/ and /i/, while gʷ became d before /e/ (but not /i/). Cf. theínō "I strike, kill" < *gʷʰen-yō vs. phónos "slaughter" < *gʷʰón-os; delphús "womb" < *gʷelbʰ- (Sanskrit garbha-) vs. bíos "life" < *gʷih₃wos (Gothic qius "alive"), tís "who?" < *kʷis (Latin quis).
- All remaining labiovelars became labials, original kʷ kʷʰ gʷ becoming p ph b respectively. That happened to all labiovelars in some dialects like Lesbian; in other dialects, like Attic, it occurred to all labiovelars not converted into dentals. Many occurrences of dentals were later converted into labials by analogy with other forms: bélos "missile", bélemnon "spear, dart" (dialectal délemnon) by analogy with bállō "I throw (a missile, etc.)", bolḗ "a blow with a missile".
- Original PIE labiovelars had still remained as such even before consonants and so became labials also there. In many other centum languages such as Latin and most Germanic languages, the labiovelars lost their labialisation before consonants. (Greek pémptos "fifth" < *pénkʷtos; compare Old Latin quinctus.) This makes Greek of particular importance in reconstructing original labiovelars.

The results of vowel contraction were complex from dialect to dialect. Such contractions occur in the inflection of a number of different noun and verb classes and are among the most difficult aspects of Ancient Greek grammar. They were particularly important in the large class of contracted verbs, denominative verbs formed from nouns and adjectives ending in a vowel. (In fact, the reflex of contracted verbs in Modern Greek, the set of verbs derived from Ancient Greek contracted verbs, represents one of the two main classes of verbs in that language.)

== Morphology ==
=== Nouns ===
Proto-Greek preserved the gender (masculine, feminine, neuter) and number (singular, dual, plural) distinctions of the nominal system of Proto-Indo-European. However, the evidence from Mycenaean Greek is inconclusive with regard to whether all eight cases continued to see complete usage, but this is more secure for the five standard cases of Classical Greek (nominative, genitive, dative, accusative and vocative) and probably also the instrumental in its usual plural suffix -pʰi and the variant /-ṓis/ for o-stem nouns. The ablative and locative are uncertain; at the time of Mycenaean texts they may have been undergoing a merger with the genitive and dative respectively. It is thought that the syncretism between cases proceeded faster for the plural, with dative and locative already merged as -si (the Proto-Indo-European locative plural having been *-su-.) This merger may have been motivated by analogy to the locative singular -i-. Nevertheless, seven case distinctions are securely attested in Mycenaean in some domain, with the status of the ablative unclear.

Significant developments attributed to the Proto-Greek period include:

- the replacement of PIE nominative plural *-ās and *-ōs by *-ai and *-oi.
- the genitive and dative dual suffix *-oi(i)n (Arcadian -oiun) appears to be exclusive to Greek.
- the genitive singular Proto-Indo-European *-āsyo, if reconstructed as such, is reflected as -āo.

The Proto-Greek nominal system is thought to have included cases of gender change according to number, heteroclisy and stem alternation (ex. genitive form húdatos for húdōr "water").

The peculiar oblique stem gunaik- ("women"), attested from the Thebes tablets, is probably Proto-Greek.

==== Examples of noun declension ====
*agrós, agrójjo (field), m.
Case	Singular	Dual	Plural
Nom.	*agrós < PIE *h₂éǵros	*agrṓ < PIE *h₂éǵroh₁	*agrói < PIE *h₂éǵroes
Gen.	*agróyyo < *h₂éǵrosyo	*agróyyun < ?	*agrṓn < *h₂éǵroHom
Dat.	*agrṓi < *h₂éǵroey	*agróyyun < ?	*agróis < *h₂éǵromos
Acc.	*agrón < *h₂éǵrom	*agrṓ < *h₂éǵroh₁	*agróns < *h₂éǵroms
Voc.	*agré < *h₂éǵre	*agrṓ < *h₂éǵroh₁	*agrói < *h₂éǵroes
Loc.	*agrói, -éi < *h₂éǵroy, -ey	?	*agróihi < *h₂éǵroysu
Instr.	*agrṓ < *h₂éǵroh₁	?	*agrṓis < *h₂éǵrōys

*pʰugā́, pʰugā́s (flight), f.
Case	Singular	Dual	Plural
Nom.	*pʰugā́ < PIE *bʰugéh₂	*pʰugáe < PIE *bʰugéh₂h₁(e)	*pʰugái < PIE *bʰugéh₂es
Gen.	*pʰugā́s < *bʰugéh₂s	*pʰugáyyun < ?	*pʰugā́ōn < *bʰugéh₂oHom
Dat.	*pʰugā́i < *bʰugéh₂ey	*pʰugáyyun < ?	*pʰugáis < *bʰugéh₂mos
Acc.	*pʰugā́n < *bʰugā́m	*pʰugáe < *bʰugéh₂h₁(e)	*pʰugáns < *bʰugéh₂m̥s
Voc.	*pʰugā́ < *bʰugéh₂	*pʰugáe < *bʰugéh₂h₁(e)	*pʰugái < *bʰugéh₂es
Loc.	*pʰugā́i? < *bʰugéh₂i	?	*pʰugā́hi < *bʰugéh₂su
Instr.	*pʰugā́ < *bʰugéh₂h₁	?	*pʰugā́is < *bʰugéh₂mis

*dzugón, dzugójjo (yoke), n.
Case	Singular	Dual	Plural
Nom.	*dzugón < PIE *yugóm	*dzugṓ < PIE *yugóy(h₁)	*dzugá < PIE *yugéh₂
Gen.	*dzugóyyo < *yugósyo	*dzugóyyun < ?	*dzugṓn < *yugóHom
Dat.	*dzugṓi < *yugóey	*dzugóyyun < ?	*dzugóis < *yugómos
Acc.	*dzugón < *yugóm	*dzugṓ < *yugóy(h₁)	*dzugá < *yugéh₂
Voc.	*dzugón < *yugóm	*dzugṓ < *yugóy(h₁)	*dzugá < *yugéh₂
Loc.	*dzugói, -éi < *yugóy, *-éy	?	*dzugóihi < *yugóysu
Instr.	*dzugṓ < *yugóh₁	?	*dzugṓis < *yugṓys

("Yoke" in later Proto-Greek and both Classical and Modern Greek is masculine due to a gender shift from *-ón to *-ós).

=== Pronouns ===
The pronouns hoûtos, ekeînos and autós are created. The use of ho, hā, to as articles is post-Mycenaean.

Pronoun	Proto-Greek < PIE
I	*egṓ < PIE *éǵh₂; (Homeric Greek egṓn < variant *eǵh₂óm)
You	*tú < *túh₂
He	*autós < *h₂ewtos (from *h₂ew, "again", and *to, "that")
She	*autā́ < *h₂ewtéh₂
It	*autó < *h₂ewtó
We two	*nṓwi < ?
You two	*spʰṓwi < ?
They (two)	*spʰо̄é < ?
We	*əhmé(e)s < *n̥smé (accusative of *wéy)
You (all)	*uhmé(e)s < *usmé (accusative of *yúHs)
They (m.)	? (Attic Greek: autoí)
They (f.)	? (Attic Greek: autaí)
They (n.)	? (Attic Greek: autá)

=== Verbs ===
Proto-Greek inherited the augment, a prefix e-, to verbal forms expressing past tense. That feature is shared only with Indo-Iranian and Phrygian (and to some extent, Armenian), lending some support to a "Graeco-Aryan" or "Inner Proto-Indo-European" proto-dialect. However, the augment down to the time of Homer remained optional and was probably little more than a free sentence particle, meaning 'previously' in Proto-Indo-European, which may easily have been lost by most other branches. Greek, Phrygian, and Indo-Iranian also concur in the absence of r-endings in the middle voice, in Greek apparently already lost in Proto-Greek.

The verbal desinence -mai for the first person singular present is from the middle voice that, according to Suzanne Kemmer, "appears to have been, diachronically, a form of *-i-". The expected third singular ending *-ti is continued in athematic forms such as Doric Greek φατί ("phatí") and τίθητι ("títhēti"). However, the expected outcome for thematic verbs, which would be *-εσι ("-esi"), was instead replaced by -ει ("-ei"). This development has been explained as the result of analogy with the primary second-person singular ending -εις ("-eis"), which is analyzable as the secondary second-person singular ending -ες ("-es") combined with -ι- ("-i-"). According to this theory, the third-singular ending would have been reshaped into -ει ("-ei") via the addition of an iota to the secondary third-singular ending -ε ("-e"). However, Sihler argues that such a theory is problematic as it fails to explain the lack of such remodeling in the athematic verbs, and also because the second-person singular ending is itself often explained as the result of secondary analogical remodeling. Alternatively, Sihler suggests that PIE already had a separate t-less thematic third-person singular ending *-ey, which would have regularly yielded Proto-Greek *-ei and eventually Greek -ει ("-ei"). This would have been homophonous with the expected second-person singular ending *-ει ("*-ei"), itself from Proto-Greek *-ehi, from PIE *-esi. Consequently, as Sihler argues, the primary second-person singular ending was reshaped into -εις ("-eis") according to the pattern of the primary third-singular form -ει ("-ei") beside the secondary third-singular ending -ε ("-e"). However, if this theory were accepted, it would necessitate that Greek showcase unusually divergent morphology when compared with other related Indo-European branches, many of which clearly attest to an earlier ending *-eti. Thus, according to the philologists Jesse Lundquist and Anthony Yates, it is better to adopt the more economic approach that the Greek third-person singular ending emerged from metathesis *-eti to *-eit at word-boundaries, followed by the subsequent regular loss of word-final stops in Greek.

The future tense is created, including a future passive as well as an aorist passive. The future passive paradigm in Ancient Greek was marked by a suffix -θή- (-thḗ-), which may relate to the Proto-Indo-European suffix *dʰ-. The aorist passive in -ή- (-ḗ-) ("ἐχάρην," "ekhárēn") may have emerged from the Proto-Indo-European stative morpheme *-eh₁, with aorist passives in -θή- developing as a later innovation.

The suffix -ka- is attached to some perfects and aorists.

Infinitives in -ehen, -enai and -men are created.

==== Examples of verb conjugation ====
*ágō (I drive), thematic
Pronoun	Verb (present)
I	*ágō < PIE *h₂éǵoh₂
You	*ágehi < *h₂éǵesi
He, she, it	*ágei < *h₂éǵeti
We two	*ágowos < *h₂éǵowos (*ágowes, *ágowen)
You two	*ágetes < *h₂éǵetes (*ágetos, *ágeton)
They (two)	*ágetes < *h₂éǵetes (*ágetos, *ágeton)
We	*ágomes < *h₂éǵomos (*ágomen)
You (all)	*ágete < *h₂éǵete
They	*ágonti < *h₂éǵonti

*ehmí (to be), athematic
Pronoun	Verb (present)
I	*ehmí < PIE *h₁ésmi
You	*ehí < *h₁ési
He, she, it	*estí < *h₁ésti
We two	*eswén? < *h₁swós
You two	*estón < *h₁stés
They (two)	*estón < *h₁stés
We	*esmén < *h₁smós
You (all)	*esté < *h₁sté
They	*ehénti < *h₁sénti

==== Examples of adjectives ====
*néwos, -ā, -on (new)
Case (plural)	PIE (plural)	Proto-Greek (plural)
Nom.	*néwos, néweh₂, néwom	*néwos, néwā, néwon
Gen.	*néwosyo, néweh₂s, néwosyo	*néwoyyo, néwās, néwoyyo
Dat.	*néwoey, néweh₂ey, néwoey	*néwōi, néwāi, néwōi
Acc.	*néwom, néwām, néwom	*néwon, néwān, néwon
Voc.	*néwe, néweh₂, néwom	*néwe, néwa, néwon
Loc.	*néwoy/ey, néweh₂i, néwoy/ey	*néwoi/ei, néwai, néwoi/ei
Instr.	*néwoh₁, néweh₂h₁, néwoh₁	*néwō, néwā, néwō

Case (singular)	PIE (singular)	PE (singular)
Nom.	*néwoes, néweh₂es, néweh₂	*néwoi, néwai, néwa
Gen.	*néwoHom, néweh₂oHom, néwoHom	*néwōn, néwāōn, néwōn
Dat.	*néwomos, néweh₂mos, néwomos	*néwois, néwais, néwois
Acc.	*néwoms, néweh₂m̥s, néweh₂	*néwons, néwans, néwa
Voc.	*néwoes, néweh₂es, néweh₂	*néwoi, néwai, néwa
Loc.	*néwoysu, néweh₂su, néwoysu	*néwoihi, néwāhi, néwoihi
Instr.	*néwōys, néweh₂mis, néwōys	*néwois, néwais, néwois

== Numerals ==
Proto-Greek numerals were derived directly from Indo-European.

- "one": *héns (masculine), *hmía (feminine) (> Myc. e-me /heméi/ (dative); Att./Ion. εἷς (ἑνός), μία, heîs (henos), mía)
- "two": *dúwō (> Myc. du-wo /dúwoː/; Hom. δύω, dúō; Att.-Ion. δύο, dúo)
- "three": *tréyes (> Myc. ti-ri /trins/; Att./Ion. τρεῖς, treîs; Lesb. τρής, trḗs; Cret. τρέες, trées)
- "four": nominative *kʷétwores, genitive *kʷeturṓn (> Myc. qe-to-ro-we /kʷétroːwes/ "four-eared"; Att. τέτταρες, téttares; Ion. τέσσερες, tésseres; Boeot. πέτταρες, péttares; Thess. πίτταρες, píttares; Lesb. πίσυρες, písures; Dor. τέτορες, tétores)
- "five": *pénkʷe (> Att.-Ion. πέντε, pénte; Lesb., Thess. πέμπε, pémpe)
- "six": *hwéks (> Att. ἕξ, héks; Dor. ϝέξ, wéks)
- "seven": *heptə́ (> Att. ἑπτά, heptá)
- "eight": *oktṓ (> Att. ὀκτώ, oktṓ)
- "nine": *ennéwə (> Att. ἐννέα, ennéa; Dor. ἐννῆ, ennê)
- "ten": *dékə (> Att. δέκα, déka)
- "hundred": *hekətón (> Att. ἑκατόν, hekatón)
- "thousand": *kʰéhliyoi (> Att. χίλιοι, khílioi)

=== Examples of numerals ===
Number	PH	PIE
One (1)	*óynos	*h₁óynos
Two (2)	*dúwō	*dwóh₁
Three (3)	*tréyes	*tréyes
Four (4)	*kʷétwores	*kʷetwóres
Five (5)	*pénkʷe	*pénkʷe
Six (6)	*hwéks	*swéḱs
Seven (7)	*heptə́	*septḿ̥
Eight (8)	*oktṓ	*(h₁)oḱtṓw
Nine (9)	*ennéwə	*h₁néwn̥
Ten (10)	*dékə	*déḱm̥
One hundred (100)	*hekətón	*heḱm̥tóm or *h₁ḱm̥tóm (*ḱm̥tóm: "100")
One thousand (1000)	*kʰehliyoi	*ǵʰesliyoy (< *ǵʰéslom, "1000")

== See also ==
- Greeks
