= Michael Meier-Brügger =

Swiss linguist (born 1948)

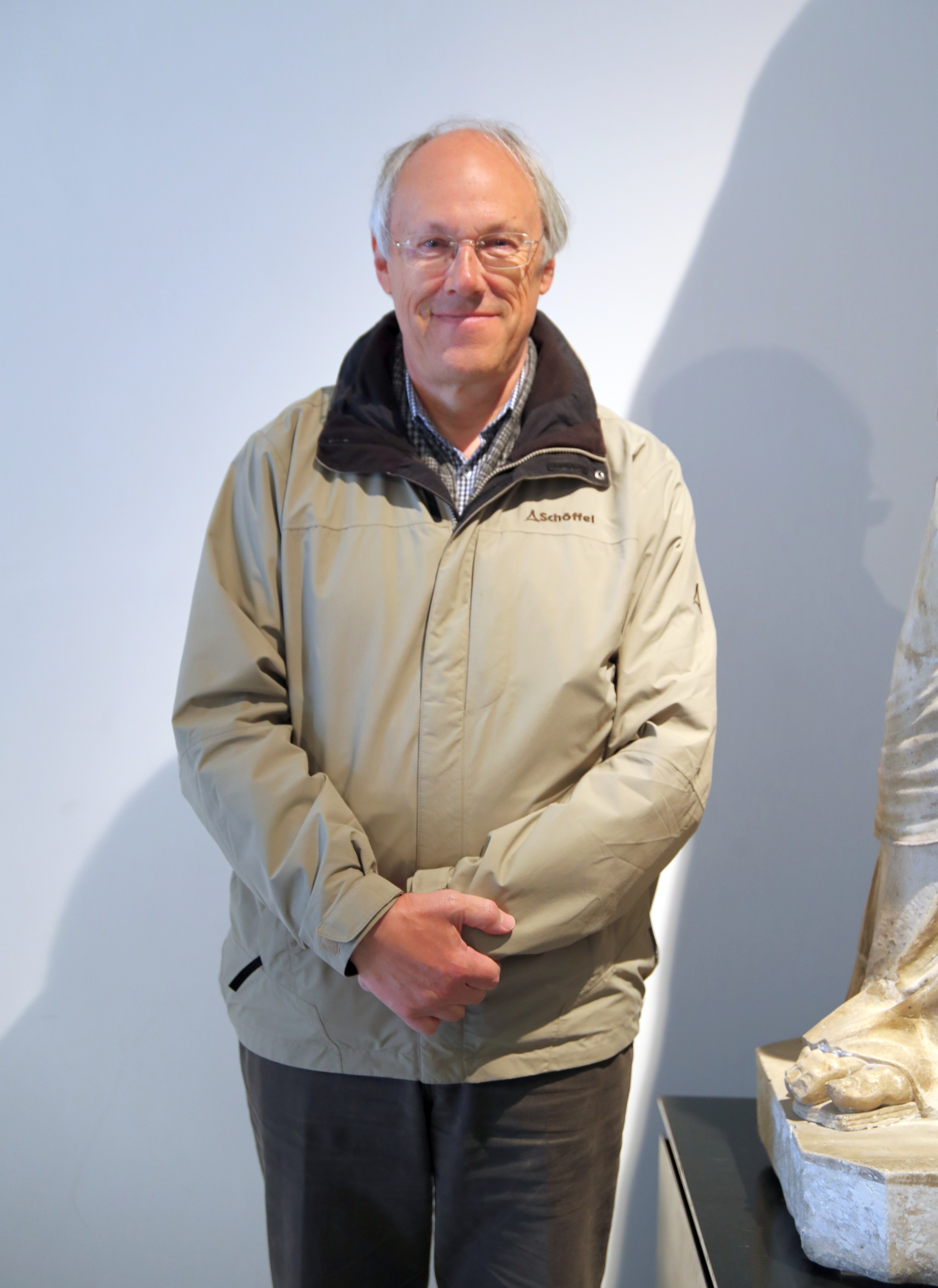
„MMB“ in March 2018 at the National Archaeological Museum, Naples.

Michael Meier-Brügger (Swiss Standard German: [maɪərˈbrʏɡər]; born 13 August 1948) is a Swiss linguist and Indo-Europeanist.

He was professor of comparative and Indo-European linguistics at the Free University of Berlin in 1996–2013. After receiving his Ph.D. from the University of Zurich in 1973, he became Ernst Risch's assistant there before going on to postdoctoral research in Erlangen, Paris, and Harvard. Afterward, he spent three years as a lecturer at Zürich and Fribourg. In 1984, he joined the editorial team of the Lexikon des frühgriechischen Epos, becoming verantwortlicher Redaktor in 1987 (responsible for fascicles 12 (1987) - 20 (2004)).

Amongst his notable publications are the Griechische Sprachwissenschaft (2 vols., 1992) and Indogermanische Sprachwissenschaft (9th edn. 2010; English version, Indo-European Linguistics, 2003).
