= Daftary =

Daftary is a surname. Notable people with the surname include:

- Farhad Daftary (born 1938), Belgian-born Iranian-British Islamic scholar
- Manu Daftary, American money manager
- Sharayu Daftary, Indian industrialist
- Spandan Daftary (born 1981), American television producer
- Leyly Matine-Daftary (1937–2007), Iranian artist
- Ali Mumtaz al-Daftary, Iraqi politician
