= Proto-Indo-European reduplicated presents =

Ancient class of verbs

Proto-Indo-European reduplicated presents, being an ancient class of Proto-Indo-European verbs, probably existed as there a variety of such forms in the daughter languages.

There is evidence to support the reconstruction of separate classes of athematic and thematic presents in Proto-Indo-European (PIE). The exact structure of any reduplicated present class in PIE is uncertain, as there are a variety of different accentuation patterns in Vedic and there also inconsistencies regarding the choice of the initial reduplicant between languages such as Ancient Greek and Sanskrit. In general, the class of thematic reduplicated presents may be reconstructed with a fixed ablaut grade and initial i-reduplication, whereas the athematic type shows varying e- and i-reduplication and a more dynamic ablaut.

== Reduplicated athematic ==
=== Ablaut ===
The root is prefixed with a copy of the initial consonant(s) of the root, separated by a vowel. The accent was perhaps fixed on this prefix, but the root grade alternates as in root athematic verbs. The vowel can be either e or i:

1. e-reduplication: *(é)-(e)-ti ~ *(é)-(∅)-nti
2. i-reduplication: *(í)-(e)-ti ~ *(í)-(∅)-nti

The *(e) ~ (Ø) ablaut of the reduplicated athematic type is possibly preserved in archaic Vedic formations, such as dádhāti ~ dhatté, perhaps from PIE *dʰédʰeh₁ti ~ *dʰédʰh₁n̥ti.

=== Reduplicant ===
There is a cognate verb in ancient Greek, τίθημι ("títhēmi"), which showcases initial i-reduplication. According to Beekes it is likely that the initial reduplication syllable of the Greek form is more archaic, as he suggests that the Sanskrit form could have adopted the initial dá- from the third-plural form dádhati. The majority of Indo-European languages exclusively utilized i-reduplication, with examples such as Ancient Greek ἵστημι ("hístēmi") and Latin sistō, both of which perhaps derive from *stísteh₂ti. Indo-Iranian, in contrast, utilizes both reduplicants alongside an innovative type of u-reduplication that is confined to roots containing u. Ultimately, based on this evidence, it has been suggested that there existed two separate Proto-Indo-European paradigms, one of which contained i-reduplication and the other e-reduplication. If this theory is accepted, then it is possible that Ancient Greek generalized the i-reduplication to all such presents, whereas Indo-Iranian preserved both formations.

There is an attested Hittite verb kukušzi ("to taste"), which perhaps parallels an attested Young Avestan form āzūzušte, perhaps hinting at a u-reduplicated Proto-Indo-European form of the shape *ǵu-ǵews-. However, the reconstruction of this term is disputed: The LIV, for instance, tentatively suggests an alternative derivation of the Avestan form from a reduplicated perfect. Another Vedic form, jujuṣan, has been varyingly interpreted as a reduplicated present connected to the aforementioned Hittite and Avestan forms or as a perfect subjunctive, though the other attested Rigvedic perfect forms of this root show the full-grade. Moreover, the philologist Alexander Lubotsky considers it unlikely that jujuṣan is an archaic form.

Alternatively, it has been proposed that Proto-Indo-European only formed i-reduplicated athematic presents and that the additional reduplicants were an Indo-Iranian innovation. It is possible that the a-reduplication in Indo-Iranian resulted from the adaptation of the reduplicant syllable to the root vowel, yielding forms such as dádāti, which belongs to the root dā. However, Sihler critiques this theory, noting the i-reduplication also occurs in Vedic terms with roots containing a, such as in mímāti, which belongs to the root mā. Another theory, postulated by the linguist Manu Leumann, maintains that a-reduplication in verbs such as dádhāti stems from the perfect, though Kortlandt argues that this proposal is premised upon a weak justification. The linguist Jeremy Rau proposes that there were two classes of athematic e-reduplicated presents and thematic i-reduplicated presents. According to Rau, the Ancient Greek language generalized the i-reduplicant to athematic present on the model of forms such as μίμνω ("mímnō").

According to Yates and Lundquist, the existence of two distinct types of reduplicated present in PIE is possible, though they argue that this theory does not adequately explain the differences in the initial reduplicant between seemingly cognate terms, such as the aforementioned Sanskrit dádhāti and Ancient Greek τίθημι ("títhēmi"). Moreover, there are certain Sanskrit roots that appear to showcase both types of reduplication. For instance, the root sac, which forms the i-reduplicated verb síṣakti, also is connected with the attested third-person plural form sáścati. (Note: Synchronically, within Sanskrit, the reduplicant vowel for many such presents is a) According to the linguist Ryan Sandell, the reconstruction of one PIE paradigm with both i- and e-reduplication better explains this Sanskrit phenomenon, whereas the assumption of two separate verbal formations in PIE necessitates that these Sanskrit reduplicated presents be explained through analogical remodeling. The linguists Eugen Hill and Michael Frotscher further argue that unifying these forms under one singular verbal class is inherently more economical and requires fewer assumptions than the reconstruction of two separate formations.

=== Accentuation ===
Regarding the accentuation, Ringe reconstructs the forms with fixed accent on the reduplicated syllable. However, the Lexikon der indogermanischen Verben (LIV) instead reconstructs an alternating pattern *(i)-(é)- ~ *(i)-(∅)- for the i-reduplicated present and *(é)-(e)- ~ *(é)-(Ø)- for the e-reduplicated present, in which case the placement of the accent on the initial syllable would correspond to e-reduplication whereas the lack of an such an accent would relate to i-reduplication. The relation between the accent and the reduplicant is perhaps reflected in Vedic forms such as dádhāti, which has an accented full-grade reduplicant, and Greek forms such as τιθέναι ("tithénai"), which has i-reduplication and an accented root. Sandell instead argues that the i-reduplication emerged as an anaptyctic vowel designed to prevent a geminate sequence, which were otherwise avoided in PIE phonology.

There is evidence in Sanskrit for multiple types of accentuation. For instance, the Sanskrit verb juhóti, which presents a first-person plural form juhumás, may demonstrate a type of hysterodynamic accent. Hill and Frotscher note that this hysterodynamic class is confined to presents that showcase u-reduplication, and it is likely a secondary development. Additionally, Vedic Sanskrit also contains a static type of accentuation. The roots hā ("to abandon") and hā ("to spring forth"), both of which were probably once the same root, also form the exclusively active verb jáhāti ("to abandon") and the exclusively mediopassive verb jíhīte ("to move"), instead of expected *jihīté. According to Hill and Frotscher, it is possible that an earlier paradigm jáhāti ~ *jihīté split, allowing for the active and mediopassive forms to be reanalyzed as separate verbs, which itself led to the remodeling of *jihīté into jíhīte according to the influence of other Sanskrit deponent verbs such as cáyate. Hill and Frotscher suggest that this remodeling affected all other reduplicated presents in Sanskrit that showcase static accent, given that the others (i.e. mímīte, ī́ṭṭe) are also deponents.

Certain i-reduplicated verbs, such as bíbharti, also showcase amphidynamic accent, such as in the first-person plural form bibhṛmási. Uniquely, these forms also do not place the accent on the inflectional ending, unlike other Sanskrit athematic presents, such as yuñjánti. This irregularity could reflect a pre-form with accent on the reduplicant, perhaps indicating that the term dádāti derives from *dédh₃n̥ti. Hill and Frotscher consider the amphidynamic accentuation to be the most archaic pattern, as they argue that it is the only type that—within Vedic—cannot be explained by secondary processes. Another Indo-Europeanist scholar, Calvert Watkins, has suggested that the unusual accent of these forms emerged due to the influence of the intensive verbs such as várvartti. Hill and Frotscher reject this interpretation, arguing that the partial reduplication and mobile accent of the reduplicated presents in contrast to the full reduplication and static accent of the intensive militates against this proposal.

Hill and Frotscher reconstruct a singular paradigm with alternating *e ~ *i. They describe a supposed pattern of a-reduplication in the strong stem, perhaps reflected by jáhāti, but i-reduplication in the weak stem, possibly demonstrated by the mediopassive form jíhīte. Ultimately, these linguists reconstruct a PIE pattern *(é)-(e)- ~ *(i)-(∅)- and propose that a preform *bʰé-bʰe/or-mi ~ *bʰi-bʰr̥-mé may have served as the source for Sanskrit bíbharti. They do, however, suggest that the third-person plural form probably retained the *(é)-(e)- ablaut, as they argue that this irregularity is present in Vedic forms such as júhvati. The philologist Jens Rasmussen instead reconstructs the ablaut sequence *(i)-(é)-ti ~ *(e)-(e)-énti as the most ancient form of the paradigm, though he suggests that—in the third-person plural—the accent retracted. Thus, regarding the development of Sanskrit dádhāti, Rasmussen reconstructs a form *dʰi-dʰéh₁-ti ~ dʰe-dʰeh₁-énti, the third-person plural of which perhaps developed into *dʰé-dʰh₁-n̥ti. Sandell is, however, critical of this reconstruction, arguing that the appearance of two e-grades in a singular word is not consistent with PIE phonology.

There several examples of a unique type of amphidynamic accentuation with the accent—in the strong stem—placed upon the root syllable. For instance, the verb bíbharti also, in some Vedic scriptures, is seemingly replaced by the term bibhárti. Hill and Frotscher dismiss these readings, arguing that the root accentuation is reserved for prose, whereas the reduplicant accentuation is present in the more archaic Vedic mantras. Furthermore, they state that the alternative form bibhárti also appears in passages of the Śrīmad-Bhāgavatam that are not connected to sections of the Rigveda or Yajurveda, which may imply—according to Hill and Frotscher—that the root accent is a late Vedic development. Within the Yajurveda, the term bibhárti appears in a section that is equivalent to a sample from the Atharvaveda, where the term bíbharti is used instead. This interpretation has been met with criticism—Sandell argues that terms such as bibhárti are lectiones difficiliores and that they probably reflect an archaic pattern of root accentuation. He instead reconstructs an ablaut paradigm of *(i)-(é)- ~ *(i)-(∅)-, though he proposes the sequence *(é)-(∅)- specifically for the third-person plural form and the participle. Thus, according to this theory, forms such as sáścati and jágat- reflect Proto-Indo-European *sé-skʷ-n̥ti and *gʷé-gʷh₂-n̥t- respectively. When laryngeal-final roots were shifted into the zero-grade, the laryngeal would have become the vowel i by the time of Vedic Sanskrit. According to Sandell, the i-reduplication then became synchronically associated with the i-vowel of the root, and thus roots marked by the vowels u and a analogically developed u- and a-reduplication.

== Reduplicated thematic ==
*(í)-(∅)-eti ~ *(í)-(∅)-onti. Like the athematic equivalent, but the vowel is i and the root is in zero-grade.

The *(i)-(∅) ablaut pattern exists in Sanskrit, where all four roots that exclusively show thematic reduplicated presents, such as tíṣṭhati, are always characterized by i-reduplication and the zero-grade of the root. Likewise, Latin reveals multiple examples possible demonstrating this ablaut type, such as bibō (< *píph₃eti) and sīdō (< *sísdeti). Throughout the Indo-European languages, there are certain thematic reduplicated forms that are seemingly cognate with athematic reduplicated verbs. For instance, the term ἵστημι ("hístēmi") is cognate with sistō and the aforementioned Sanskrit tíṣṭhati, both of which are thematic and may thus attest to an originally thematic paradigm in PIE. According to the linguist Michael Weiss, it is possible that the Greek form represents a process of secondary thematicization. The Ancient Greek verb μίμνω ("mímnō") may parallel the Hittite *h₂e-conjugation verb mimmai, perhaps indicating an ancestral connection between the reduplicated thematic type and *h₂e-conjugation. The connection between the Greek and Hittite form is, however, not uncontroversial: Beekes explicitly rejects the etymology, and Kloekhorst suggests that the Hittie term more probably derives from Proto-Indo-European *mi-móh₁-ei.
