= Anand Jain =

Indian business executive (born 1957)

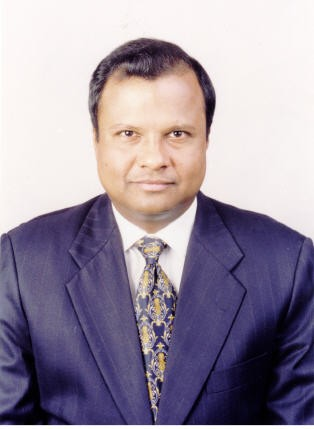
- Passport Photo
- Born: 1957 (age 68–69)
- Occupation: Business executive
- Known for: Expertise in financial services and real estate;
- Title: Chairman of Jai Corp Ltd.
- Spouse: Sushma Jain
- Children: Neha, Harsh

Anand Jain (born 1957) is an Indian business executive. He is the Chairman of Jai Corp. Limited.

Anand Jain was No. 11 on the Forbes India's 40 Richest list in 2007. His son, Harsh Jain, is the co-founder and CEO of the Indian fantasy sports company Dream11.

== Business career ==
According to an article published in The Economic Times in 2005, Anand Jain was first noted in Reliance in the mid-1980s, when he crushed the bear cartel led by Manu Manek, the then kingpin of Bombay Stock Exchange. Later, he emerged as a key figure in the running of the day-to-day operations of the Reliance Group, particularly its telecom venture Reliance Infocomm. In January 2005, Anil Ambani (brother of Mukesh Ambani) resigned as vice chairman and director of IPCL, citing his differences with Anand Jain. In June 2005, media reported that Jain would step down from the IPCL board after a settlement was announced between the two Ambani brothers. However, in July 2005, it was reported that he has stayed on the IPCL board.

Anand Jain has been closely associated with the Fortune 500 Reliance Group for over 25 years. He served as the vice-chairman of Reliance Capital and also on the Reliance group company Indian Petro Chemicals Ltd. (IPCL).

Anand Jain served on the board of trustees of Mumbai Port Trust twice for two years each and also on the Jawaharlal Nehru Port from April 1994 to March 1995. He is also a director of Rewas Port Limited. He is an adviser to the Urban Infrastructure Real Estate Fund, which has raised US$500 million from international investors, and along with the local participation of US$60 million, the total fund size is US$560 million.

Anand Jain is also the Chairman of Urban Infrastructure Venture Capital Limited, which manages the Urban Infrastructure Venture Capital Fund. He is also a director of the following ventures:

Presently a senior executive with the Reliance Group, Anand Jain, is involved in the first greenfield Special Economic Zone (SEZ) at Mumbai.

Anand Jain is a member of the Managing Council of Sir H. N. Reliance Foundation Hospital and Research Centre. He has been appointed by the Government of Maharashtra as a member of the "Empowered Committee for Transformation of Mumbai into a World-Class City." He is also a member of the "Citizens Action Group," dedicated to bringing Mumbai on the international map.
