= Kafkania pebble =

Alleged archaeological artifact

The front and rear views of the stone.

The Kafkania pebble is a small rounded river pebble about 5 centimetres (2.0 in) long, with marks resembling Linear B and a double axe inscribed on it. It was found in Kafkania, some 7 km (4.3 mi) north of Olympia, on 1 April 1994 in a 17th-century BC archaeological context. If it were genuine, it would be the earliest writing on the Greek mainland, and by far the earliest document in Linear B. The Kafkania Pebble would also have had to exist two or more centuries before the earliest of the Linear B Documents. However, it is in all probability a modern forgery and a hoax.

== Inscription ==
The pebble bears a short inscription of eight signs apparently from the Linear B syllabary, possibly reading a-so-na / qo-ro-qa / qa-jo. The reverse side shows a double-axe symbol. The inscription is identified by some to be in Mycenean Greek, but that identification remains disputed. It has been suggested that such an isolated example of Linear B script indicates, at best, an early stage of Mycenaean writing at the time of origin.

G. Owens suggests that the inscription is Minoan in origin rather than Mycenaean. Then, a Minoan could have written the text for a Mycenaean. No evidence exists that the Mycenaean Greeks wrote before the Linear B archive of Knossos.

== Forgery ==
Several specialists in Mycenaean epigraphy have expressed serious doubts about the authenticity of the inscription; indications that it is a modern forgery include:

- Inscriptions on pebbles are otherwise unknown in Mycenaean and Minoan epigraphy.
- The "rays" surrounding the axe have no parallels in Mycenaean or Minoan iconography.
- Most of the symbols are "carefully executed" but one appears to be a "random graffito".
- Its context, imbedded in a wall, is peculiar and unprecedented.
- Linear B is otherwise consistently written left-to-right, but the inscription is apparently written in boustrophedon.
- The writing style appears anachronistic.
- It is unlikely on historical grounds that Linear B writing then existed in the northwest Peloponnese.
- Finally, the pebble was apparently discovered on the morning of April Fool's Day. If it is indeed a forgery, the symbols spelling a-so-na may spell out the name Iasonas, the first name of the son of Xeni Arapojanni and Jörg Rambach, the alleged discoverers of the pebble.

== See also ==
- Psychro or Epioi inscription, a modern forgery involving characters resembling Linear A characters

== Sources ==
- Arapojanni, Xeni; Rambach, Jörg; Godart, Louis (2002). Kavkania: Die Ergebnisse der Ausgrabung von 1994 auf dem Hügel von Agrilitses. Mainz: von Zabern. ISBN 3-8053-2934-2.
