= Hermann Mittelberger =

Austrian linguist (1935–2004)

Hermann Mittelberger (24 January 1935 in Klagenfurt – 13 May 2004 in Treibach-Althofen) was an Austrian Indo-Europeanist.

After spending childhood and youth in Klagenfurt, Mittelberger studied Indo-European linguistics, classical philology, and Indology (Sanskrit) at the University of Vienna. In 1962, he finished his studies with a PhD in Indo-European linguistics and passed the final teachers' exam for Latin and [Greek].

From 1957 until 1962, Mittelberger was an assistant at the Institute of Indology in Vienna. In 1963, he became a scientific clerk for Indo-European linguistics and the Hittite language at the Institut voor Osterse Talen at the University of Utrecht.

From 1964 until 1971, he was assistant at the Institute of Linguistics at the University of Würzburg, where in 1969, he passed his habilitation for Comparative (Indo-European) linguistics.

From December 1971 onwards, Mittelberger was professor for Comparative (Indo-European) linguistics at the University of Graz, and from 1973-1988 also director of the Institute for translation studies ("Institut für Übersetzer- und Dolmetscherausbildung").

His research centered on the proto-Indo-European language, the Indo-European languages of (old) Anatolia, Indo-Aryan languages (Sanskrit, Middle Indic), Iranian (Old Persian, Avestic, Middle Iranian), Greek (including Linear B), Latin and languages of old Italy, as well as Germanic with special interest in Gothic.

Mittelberger was a very knowledgeable scholar and earlier known as a brilliant Indo-Europeanist. In his last years, he was much less active, which turned out to be the effect of an unrecognized serious illness.
