= Eduard Schwyzer =

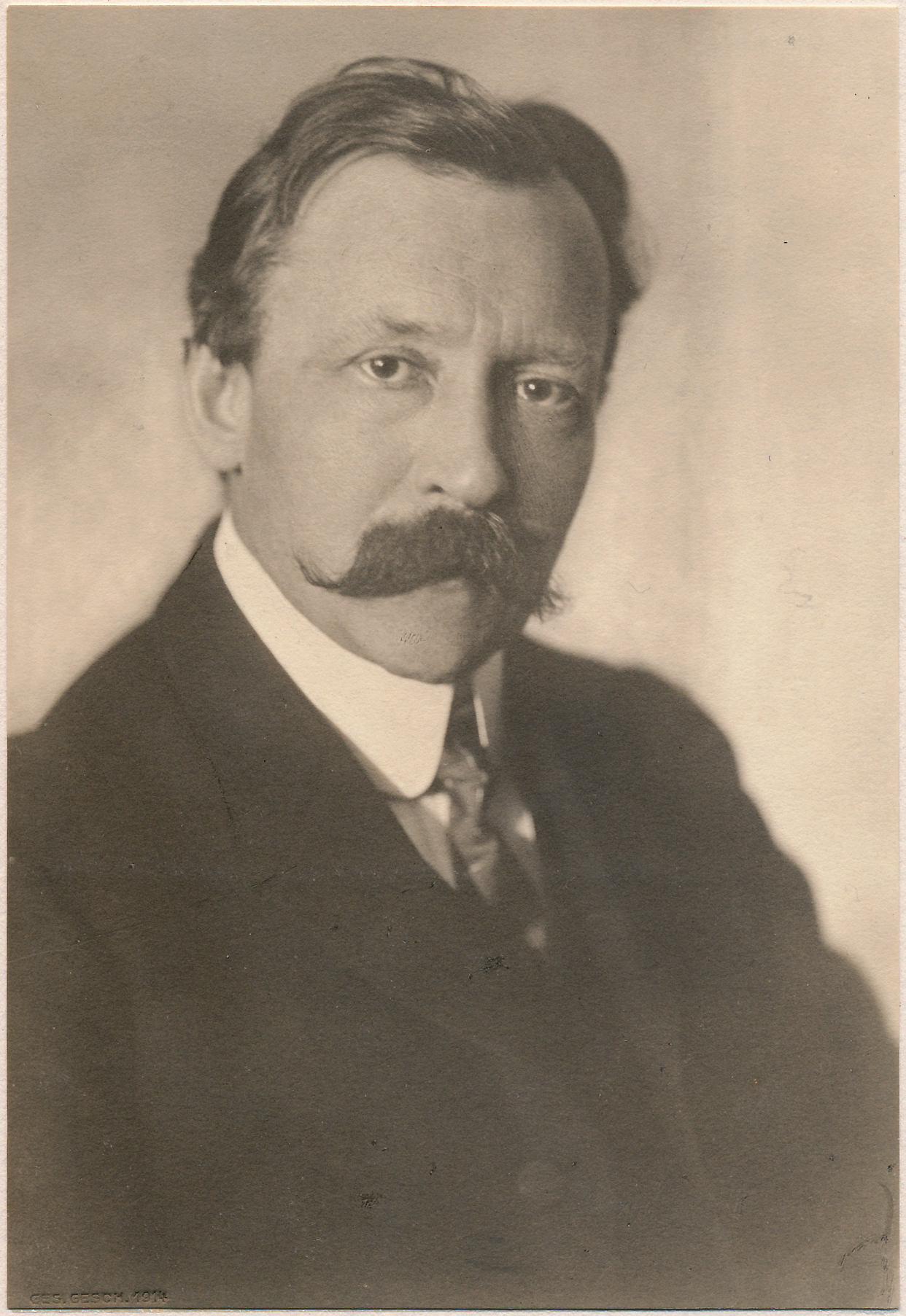
- Born: 15 February 1874; Zürich
- Died: 3 May 1943 (aged 69); Berlin, Germany
- Occupations: Linguist, professor

Eduard Schwyzer (15 February 1874, Zürich – 3 May 1943, Berlin) was a Swiss classical philologist and Indo-European linguist, specializing in Ancient Greek and Greek dialects.

He was a professor in Zürich 1912–1926, in Bonn from 1927 and in Berlin from 1932. 1898–1927 and 1934–1943 he also worked for the Schweizerisches Idiotikon, first as an editor, later reading all correction sheets.

== Works ==
- Grammatik der Pergamenischen Inschriften 1898
- Dialectorum graecarum exempla epigraphica potiora 1923
- Griechische Grammatik I 1939, II 1950
- Kleine Schriften, 1983, ed. R. Schmitt
