= Leiden Studies in Indo-European =

Leiden Studies in Indo-European (ISSN 0926-5856) is an academic book series on Indo-European studies.
The series was founded in 1991 and is published by Rodopi.

== Editors ==
- R.S.P. Beekes
- A. Lubotsky
- J.J.S. Weitenberg

== Volumes ==
Volumes include:

- #20. The Germanic loanwords in Proto-Slavic. By Saskia Pronk-Tiethoff. ISBN 978-90-420-3732-8 E-ISBN 978-94-012-0984-7
- #19. The Vedic -ya-presents. Passives and intransitivity in Old Indo-Aryan., by Leonid Kulikov. ISBN 978-90-420-3522-5 E-ISBN 978-94-012-0797-3
- #18. The Proto-Germanic n-stems., by Guus Kroonen. ISBN 978-90-420-3292-7 E-ISBN 978-90-420-3293-4
- #17. Studies in Germanic, Indo-European and Indo-Uralic, by Frederik Kortlandt. ISBN 978-90-420-3135-7
- #16. Baltica & Balto-Slavica, by Frederik Kortlandt. ISBN 978-90-420-2652-0
- #15. Variation and Change in Tocharian B, by Michaël Peyrot. ISBN 978-90-420-2401-4
- #14. Italo-Celtic Origins and Prehistoric Development of the Irish Language, by Frederik Kortlandt. ISBN 978-90-420-2177-8
- #13. Le désidératif en védique, by François Heenen. ISBN 978-90-420-2091-7
- #12. The Avestan Vowels, by Michiel de Vaan. ISBN 978-90-420-1065-9
- #11. Description of the Greek Individual Verbal Systems, by Henri M.F.M. van de Laar. ISBN 90-420-0669-2
- #10. A Dictionary of Tocharian B. Revised and Greatly Enlarged., by Douglas Q. Adams. ISBN 90-420-3671-0 E-BOOK 978-94-012-0936-6
