= Manu Platt =

American biomedical engineer and researcher

- Born: 1979 (age 46–47)
- Education: Morehouse College; Georgia Institute of Technology
- Scientific career
- Workplaces: Massachusetts Institute of Technology; Georgia Institute of Technology; NIH Intramural Research Program
- Thesis: Role of shear stress in the differential regulation of endothelial cathepsins and cystatin C (2006)

Manu Omar Platt (born 1980) is an American biomedical engineer serving as the director of the NIH Biomedical Engineering Technology Acceleration (BETA) center. He also serves as NIBIB Associate Director for Scientific Diversity, Equity and Inclusion.

He was previously a professor at the Georgia Institute of Technology Wallace H. Coulter Department of Biomedical Engineering. He served as Diversity Director of the Center on Emergent Behaviors of Integrated Cellular Systems.

== Early life and education ==
Platt is the son of a veteran of the United States Air Force. He spent his high school years in Dover, Delaware. As a high school student, Platt took part in science enrichment programmes at Delaware State University. He earned his undergraduate degree at Morehouse College, where he studied biology as an ARCS Foundation scholar. At Morehouse, Platt was mentored by Robert M. Nerem, and he took part in the Morehouse SPACE scholar programme. On Nerem's advice Platt moved to the Georgia Institute of Technology for his graduate studies, where he worked with Hanjoong Jo on endothelial cell biology. His doctoral research was performed in collaboration with Emory University School of Medicine, as one of the first students to be part of the newly established biomedical engineering program. After earning his doctoral degree he joined Massachusetts Institute of Technology (MIT).

== Research and career ==
In 2009 Platt was appointed to the faculty of the Coulter Department of Biomedical Engineering at Georgia Tech, where he investigated the proteolytic mechanisms of disease, with a focus on conditions that impact Black communities. He has concentrated on reducing the occurrence of stroke in patients with sickle cell disease.

Platt has investigated how scientific discoveries have impacted the governmental response to HIV/AIDS. He studied the various bills introduced by the United States Congress, and found that whilst the number of bills was related to breakthroughs in scientific research, it did not impact the passage of laws.

Platt is the founding director of Engaging New Generations at Georgia Tech through Engineering and Science (ENGAGES), a biotechnology and engineering research scheme for African American high school students. He delivered the 2017 Biomedical Engineering Society lecture, where he spoke about being from an underrepresented group in science, "Often, if you are the first or the only of a particular demographic category, the path is neither well paved, nor well lit,". He remarked that scientists can feel like they are waiting for the "perfect time", to be impactful in promoting diversity and inclusion. In 2019 he was selected as a Keystone Symposia Fellow. In response to the George Floyd protests, universities released statements that called out racism within their research institutions. Platt wrote a perspective piece for Nature Reviews Materials on racism within academia, in which he wrote, "It is said that science is a meritocracy; however, that only holds true if Black professors' existence is accepted."

Platt was chosen, after a nationwide search, to become inaugural director for the NIBIB Biomedical Engineering Technology Acceleration (BETA) center, which works on translational, cross-disciplinary projects.

== Awards and honours ==
- NIH/International AIDS Society Scholarship
- National Institutes of Health Director's New Innovator Award
- Georgia Tech Biomedical Engineering Society Diversity Award
- Georgia Distinguished Cancer Scientist Award
- Emerging Scholar, Diverse: Issues in Higher Education magazine

== Selected publications ==
- Barabino, Gilda A.; Platt, Manu O.; Kaul, Dhananjay K. (2010-08-15). "Sickle Cell Biomechanics". Annual Review of Biomedical Engineering. 12 (1): 345–367. doi:10.1146/annurev-bioeng-070909-105339. ISSN 1523-9829. PMID 20455701.
- Sorescu, George P.; Sykes, Michelle; Weiss, Daiana; Platt, Manu O.; Saha, Aniket; Hwang, Jinah; Boyd, Nolan; Boo, Yong C.; Vega, J. David; Taylor, W. Robert; Jo, Hanjoong (2003-08-15). "Bone Morphogenic Protein 4 Produced in Endothelial Cells by Oscillatory Shear Stress Stimulates an Inflammatory Response". Journal of Biological Chemistry. 278 (33): 31128–31135. doi:10.1074/jbc.M300703200. ISSN 0021-9258. PMID 12766166. S2CID 37233984.
- Sorescu George P.; Song Hannah; Tressel Sarah L.; Hwang Jinah; Dikalov Sergey; Smith Debra A.; Boyd Nolan L.; Platt Manu O.; Lassègue Bernard; Griendling Kathy K.; Jo Hanjoong (2004-10-15). "Bone Morphogenic Protein 4 Produced in Endothelial Cells by Oscillatory Shear Stress Induces Monocyte Adhesion by Stimulating Reactive Oxygen Species Production From a Nox1-Based NADPH Oxidase". Circulation Research. 95 (8): 773–779. doi:10.1161/01.RES.0000145728.22878.45. PMID 15388638. S2CID 1016941.

== Personal life ==
Platt is one of six sons, including political science researcher Matthew B. Platt. He is a master of origami.
