= Manu Diericx =

Belgian politician (born 1994)

Member of the Senate
- Incumbent
- Assumed office 13 December 2024
- Appointed by: Flemish Parliament
- Preceded by: Sander Loones

Personal details
- Born: 30 September 1994 (age 31)
- Party: New Flemish Alliance

Manu Diericx (born 30 September 1994) is a Belgian politician serving as a member of the Senate and the Flemish Parliament since 2024. He has been a substitute member of the Parliamentary Assembly of the Council of Europe since 2025.
