= Manu (Kannada author) =

Indian scientist and Kannadiga author (1951–2011)

- Born: P. N. Rangan; 1951; Mysore, Karnataka, India
- Died: 8 November 2011 (aged 59–60)
- Education: Postgraduate in Kannada literature and Psychology; Postgraduate Diploma holder in Epigraphy and Ancient History and Archaeology.
- Occupations: Scientist; Assistant director to Senior Deputy Director; Engineer; Technical advisor; Author
- Writing career
- Pen name: Manu
- Language: Kannada, Telugu, English
- Genres: Biography, fiction, Juvenile and Paraphrases

P. N. Rangan (1951– 8 November 2011, known by his pen name Manu) was an Indian scientist and Kannadiga author.

== Career ==
Manu wrote more than 9 books in 9 publications in Kannada, Telugu and English languages.

"The incidents, anecdotes and themes delineated in the Rigveda, Purusha Sookta, Upanishads, and the Mahabharata involving immortals, mortals and demons with varied landscape and ambience emphasised by magical realism and the undercurrent of political realities disturbed me to the core. Being a student of science and culture, I struggled to find a balanced answer. Established scientific theories and several interpretations of Rigveda helped me discern a method of understanding the relative relationship between the two great texts."

"I am too small a person to speak authoritatively and affirmatively on the issues involved. I am aware it demands hard work from great scholars and scientists as Rigveda can only be understood by complete scientific approach. Complete scientific approach means authentic and comprehensive understanding of innumerable faculties of science. Maha Samparka is a humble attempt in this direction. Now I am all set to devote the rest of my life to work on Bruhad Bharata, a logical extension of Maha Samparka. I feel I am blessed if my work stands the test of the time."

— P.N. Rangan, Sharing his thoughts with The Hindu, about the notion and purpose of his book Maha Samparka, a day before its release.

== Bibliography ==
Book	Language	Year	Publisher	Ref
*Śrī Vēdavyāsa Praṇīta Mahābhārata (Meaning: Veda Vyāsa written Mahabharata)	Kannada	2011	Bhāratī Prakāśana, Mysūru	
*Makkaḷigāgi- Ījiptna Kathegaḷu (Meaning: For children – Stories of Egypt)	Kannada	2008	Vasanta Prakāśana, Beṅgaḷūru	
*Manu Kathālōka : Samagra Sampuṭa (Meaning: Manu story world – Complete volume)	Kannada	2007	Ōṅkāra Prakāśana, Beṅgaḷūru	
*Karṇā (Meaning: Karna of Mahabharata)	Kannada	2006	Prakāśa Sāhitya, Beṅgalūru	
*Katheyoḷagina Kathe : Ondu Sāhityaka ātmakathana (Meaning: Story inside a story – One literary autobiography)	Kannada	2003	Bhāratī Prakāśana, Mysūru	
*Kasadinda Rasa : Śrī Ji.Vi.Dāmōdara Nāyuḍu Avara ātmakathe (Meaning: Juice from garbage – G.V.Damodar Naydu's autobiography)	Kannada	2003	Bhāratī Prakāśana, Mysūru	
*Mahā Samparka (Meaning: Great connection) (viz. between Mahabharata and Science)	Kannada	2002	Vimal Books, Navadehali	
*Ayana	Kannada	-NA-	-NA-	
*Prācīna Ījipt : Saṃskr̥tiya Mūlakkondu Payaṇa (Meaning: Ancient Egypt – Journey to a cultural root)	Telugu	2007	Aṅkita Pustaka, Beṅgaḷūru	
*Methodological Frame of the Field	English	2005	New age Books, New Delhi	

== Awards ==
Year	Award	Film	Credits	Category	Result
1987–88	Karnataka State Film Award	Aasphota	Story writer	Best Story	Won

== See also ==
- List of people from Karnataka
