= Manu Shrine =

- Born: Sergey Deulin; February 12, 1987
- Origin: Yekaterinburg, Russia
- Died: July 5, 2015 (aged 28)
- Genres: Future garage, post-dubstep, ambient
- Years active: 2013–2015
- Website: manushrine.bandcamp.com

Sergey Deulin (February 12, 1987 – August 2, 2015), better known as Manu Shrine, was a future garage, post-dubstep and ambient producer born in Yekaterinburg, Russia. He self-released a full-length album and several EPs. His moody emotional compositions gained online popularity through SoundCloud and SomaFM's Fluid radio.

Manu Shrine composed the music for the mobile app Let's Twist.

== Discography ==
=== Studio albums ===
- Annutara Ash (2013)

=== Extended plays ===
- Last Works (2014)
- Blame Us (2014)
- Inmate (2013)
