= Ivo Hajnal =

Swiss–Austrian philologist (born 1961)

- Born: 1961 (age 64–65); Zürich, Switzerland

Academic background
- Education: University of Zurich (PhD)

Academic work
- Discipline: Linguist
- Sub-discipline: Philology; Indo-European languages
- Institutions: University of Innsbruck

Ivo Hajnal (born 1961 in Zürich) is a Swiss–Austrian philologist and linguist, specialized in Indo-European studies and Mycenaean Greek.

Hajnal studied Indo-European linguistics and philology at the University of Zurich, and received his PhD in 1990 for a dissertation on the Mycenaean Greek case system. His Habilitation (completed in 1995) focused on ancient Lycian.

Following positions in Berlin and Münster, Hajnal was appointed a full professor in ancient linguistics at the University of Innsbruck in 2001. He was later made Chairman of the Senate in 2004.

Hajnal is a member of the Luwian Studies foundation board.
