= Manu Shlomovich =

Israeli footballer

Emanuel "Manu" Shlomovich 'עמנואל "מנו" שלומוביץ
Personal information
- Full name: Emanuel "Manu" Shlomovich
- Date of birth: 1927
- Place of birth: Botoroaga, Teleorman County, Romania
- Date of death: 2000 (aged 72–73)
- Place of death: Rishon LeZion, Israel

Senior career*
Years	Team	Apps	(Gls)
1946–1947	Juventus	0	(0)
1948–1950	Maccabi Netanya		
1951	Beitar Netanya		
- Hapoel Kfar Yona
- * Club domestic league appearances and goals

Manu Shlomovich (Hebrew: 'מנו שלומוביץ; 1927–2000) was an Israeli footballer who played for Juventus and Maccabi Netanya.

Both of his sons Eliezer and Moshe also played football, both played together in Maccabi Netanya.
