= Mycenaean Greek =

Earliest attested form of the Greek language

- Native to: Mycenean Greece
- Region: Southern Balkans/Crete
- Era: 16th–12th century BC
- Language family: Indo-European: Hellenic; (disputed); Achaean; Mycenaean Greek
- Writing system: Linear B

Language codes
- ISO 639-3: gmy
- Glottolog: myce1242
- Map of Greece as described in Homer's Iliad. The geographical data is believed to refer primarily to Bronze Age Greece, when Mycenaean Greek would have been spoken, and so can be used as an estimator of the range.

Mycenaean Greek is the earliest attested form of the Greek language. It was spoken on the Greek mainland and Crete in Mycenaean Greece (16th to 12th centuries BC). The language is preserved in inscriptions in Linear B, a script first attested on Crete before the 14th century BC. Most inscriptions are on clay tablets found in Knossos, in central Crete, as well as in Pylos, in the southwest of the Peloponnese. Other tablets have been found at Mycenae itself, Tiryns and Thebes and at Chania, in Western Crete. The language is named after Mycenae, one of the major centres of Mycenaean Greece.

The tablets long remained undeciphered, and many languages were suggested for them, until Michael Ventris, building on the extensive work of Alice Kober, deciphered the script in 1952.

The texts on the tablets are mostly lists and inventories. No prose narrative survives, much less myth or poetry. Still, much may be gleaned from these records about the people who produced them and about Mycenaean Greece, the period before the so-called Greek Dark Ages.

== Corpus ==
The corpus of Mycenaean-era Greek writing consists of some 6,000 tablets and potsherds in Linear B, from LMII to LHIIIB. No Linear B monuments or non-Linear B transliterations have yet been found.

The so-called Kafkania pebble has been claimed as the oldest known Mycenaean inscription, with a purported date to the 17th century BC. However, its authenticity is widely doubted, and most scholarly treatments of Linear B omit it from their corpora.

The earliest generally-accepted date for a Linear B tablet belongs to the tablets from the 'Room of the Chariot Tablets' at Knossos, which are believed to date to the LM II-LM IIIA period, between the last half of the 15th century BCE and the earliest years of the 14th.

== Variations and possible dialects ==
While the Mycenaean dialect is relatively uniform at all the centres where it is found, there are also a few traces of dialectal variants:

- i for e in the dative of consonant stems
- a instead of o as the reflex of ṇ (e.g. pe-ma instead of pe-mo < *spermṇ)
- the e/i variation in e.g. te-mi-ti-ja/ti-mi-ti-ja

Based on such variations, Ernst Risch (1966) postulated the existence of some dialects within Linear B. The "Normal Mycenaean" would have been the standardized language of the tablets, and the "Special Mycenaean" represented some local vernacular dialect (or dialects) of the particular scribes producing the tablets.

Thus, "a particular scribe, distinguished by his handwriting, reverted to the dialect of his everyday speech" and used the variant forms, such as the examples above.

It follows that after the collapse of Mycenaean Greece, while the standardized Mycenaean language was no longer used, the particular local dialects reflecting local vernacular speech would have continued, eventually producing the various Greek dialects of the historic period.

Such theories are also connected with the idea that the Mycenaean language constituted a type of a special koine representing the official language of the palace records and the ruling aristocracy. When the 'Mycenaean linguistic koine' fell into disuse after the fall of the palaces because the script was no longer used, the underlying dialects would have continued to develop in their own ways. That view was formulated by Antonin Bartonek. Other linguists like Leonard Robert Palmer and Yves Duhoux also support this view of the 'Mycenaean linguistic koine'. (The term 'Mycenaean koine' is also used by archaeologists to refer to the material culture of the region.) However, since the Linear B script does not indicate several possible dialectical features, such as the presence or absence of word-initial aspiration and the length of vowels, it is unsafe to extrapolate that Linear B texts were read as consistently as they were written.

The evidence for "Special Mycenaean" as a distinct dialect has, however, been challenged. Thompson argues that Risch's evidence does not meet the diagnostic criteria to reconstruct two dialects within Mycenaean. In particular, more recent paleographical study, not available to Risch, shows that no individual scribe consistently writes "Special Mycenaean" forms.

=== Survival ===
The prevailing dialect spoken in southern Greece (including Achaea, the Argolid, Laconia, Crete, and Rhodes) at the end of the Bronze Age, was Proto-Arcadocypriot. The Mycenaean and Arcadocypriot dialects belong to the same group, known as Achaean. Certain common innovations of Arcadian and Cypriot, as attested in the first millennium BC, indicate that they represent vernaculars that had slightly diverged from the Mycenaean administrative language, sometime before a migration to Cyprus; possibly during the 13th or 12th century BC.

Ancient Pamphylian also shows some similarity to Arcadocypriot and to Mycenaean Greek.

== Greek features ==
Mycenaean had already undergone the following sound changes particular to the Greek language and so is considered to be Greek:

=== Phonological changes ===
- Initial and intervocalic *s to /h/.
- Voiced aspirates devoiced.
- Syllabic liquids to /ar, al/ or /or, ol/; syllabic nasals to /a/ or /o/.
- *kj and *tj to /s/ before a vowel.
- Initial *j to /h/ or replaced by z (exact value unknown, possibly [dz]).
- *gj and *dj to /z/.
- *-ti to /-si/ (also found in Attic-Ionic, Arcadocypriot, and Lesbian, but not Doric, Boeotian, or Thessalian).

=== Morphological changes ===
- The use of -eus to produce agent nouns
- The third-person singular ending -ei
- The infinitive ending -ein, contracted from -e-en

=== Lexical items ===
- 𐀣𐀯𐀩𐀄, qa-si-re-u, *gʷasiléus (later Greek: βασιλεύς, basiléus, "king")
- 𐀏𐀒, ka-ko, *kʰalkós (later Greek: χαλκός, chalkos, "bronze")
- 𐀷𐀙𐀏, wa-na-ka, *wánaks (later Greek: ἄναξ, ánax, "overlord, king, leader")
- 𐀷𐀙𐀭, wa-na-sa, *wánassa (later Greek: ἄνασσα, ánassa, "queen")
- 𐀁𐀨𐀺, e-ra-wo or 𐀁𐁉𐀺, e-rai-wo, *élaiwon (later Greek: ἔλαιον, élaion, "olive oil")
- 𐀳𐀃, te-o, *tʰehós (later Greek: θεός, theos, "god")
- 𐀴𐀪𐀡, ti-ri-po, *tripos (later Greek: τρίπους, tripous, "tripod")

=== Comparison with Ancient (Homeric) Greek ===
Modern translation by Wiseman (2010) of the first five lines of the Iliad into reconstructed Mycenaean Greek
Line	Mycenaean Greek (Linear B script)	Transliteration of Mycenaean Greek	Homeric Greek (Greek alphabet: modern orthography)	Transliteration of Homeric Greek
1	𐀗𐀛𐄁𐀀𐀸𐀆𐄁𐀳𐀀𐄁𐀟𐀩𐀷𐀆𐀃𐀍𐄁𐀀𐀑𐀩𐀺𐄁	Monin aweyde Tʰeha Pelewadeohyo Akʰilēwos	Μῆνιν ἄειδε θεᾱ̀ Πηληϊάδεω Ἀχιλῆος	Mênin áeide theā̀ Pēlēïádeō Akhilêos
2	𐀃𐀫𐀕𐀙𐄁𐁀𐀘𐀹𐀊𐄁𐀀𐀏𐀺𐄁𐀀𐀑𐀊𐄁𐀁𐀳𐀐𐄁	olomenān, hā=murwia Akʰaywoys algya etʰēke,	οὐλομένην, ἣ μῡρί᾽ Ἀχαιοῖς ἄλγε᾽ ἔθηκε,	ouloménēn, hḕ mūrí' Akhaioîs álge' éthēke,
3	𐀡𐀩𐀷𐀆𐄁𐀂𐀠𐀴𐀗𐄁𐀢𐀱𐀏𐄁𐀀𐀹𐀅𐄁𐀡𐀫𐀊𐀟𐀮𐄁	polewas=de ipʰtʰimons psūkʰans Awidāy proyapse	πολλᾱ̀ς δ᾽ ἰφθῑ́μους ψῡχᾱ̀ς Ἄϊδι προΐαψεν	pollā̀s d' iphthī́mous psūkhā̀s Áïdi proḯapsen
4	𐀁𐀫𐀺𐄁𐁂𐀵𐀆𐄁𐀸𐀫𐀨𐄁𐀳𐀄𐀐𐄁𐀓𐀯𐄁	hērōwōn, awtons=de welōra tewkʰe kunsi	ἡρώων, αὐτοὺς δὲ ἑλώρια τεῦχε κύνεσσιν	hērṓōn, autoùs dè helṓria teûkhe kúnessin
5	𐀃𐀺𐀜𐀂𐀤𐄁𐀞𐀯𐄁𐀇𐀺𐀆𐄁𐀁𐀤𐀩𐀁𐀵𐄁𐀦𐀨𐄁	oywonoyhi=kʷe pansi, Diwos=de ekʷeleeto gʷōlā,	οἰωνοῖσί τε πᾶσι, Διὸς δ᾽ ἐτελείετο βουλή,	oiōnoîsí te pâsi, Diòs d' eteleíeto boulḗ,

== Phonology ==
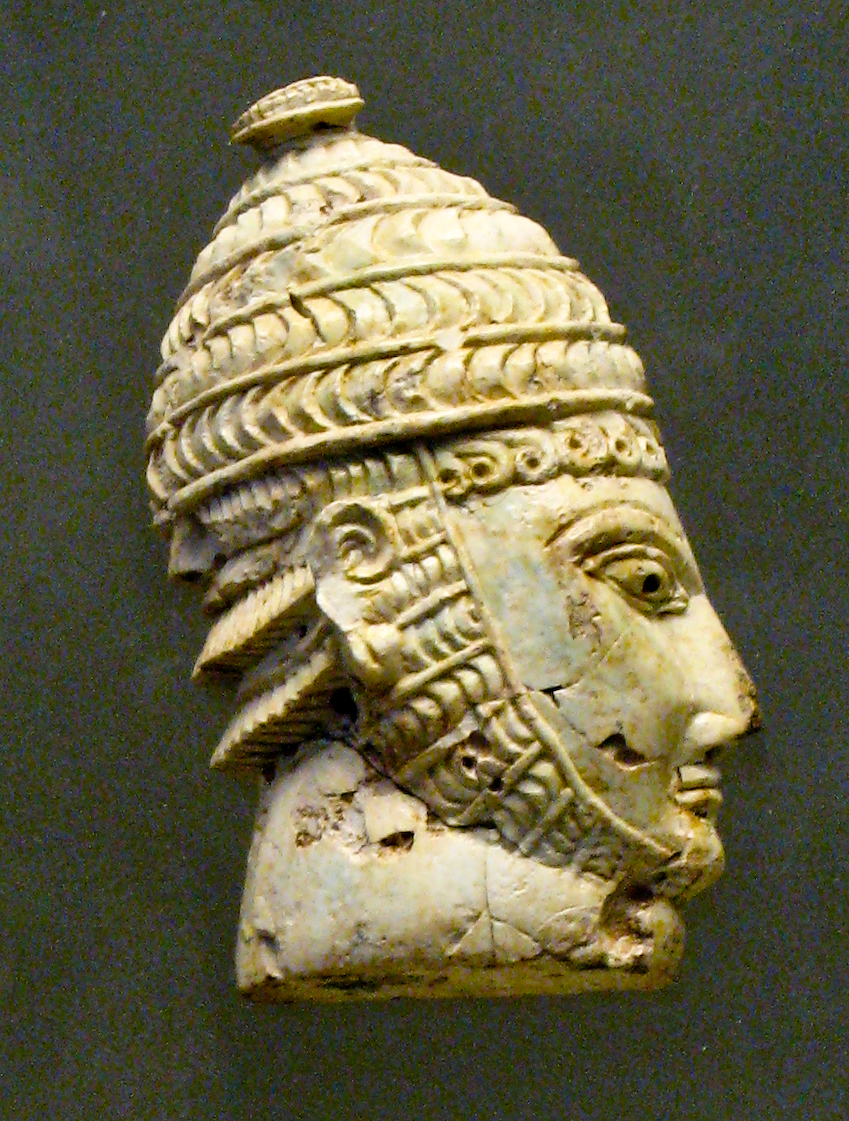
Warrior wearing a boar's tusk helmet, from a Mycenaean chamber tomb in the Acropolis of Athens, 14th–13th century BC.

Type		Bilabial	Dental	Palatal	Velar		Glottal
Type		Bilabial	Dental	Palatal	central	lab.	Glottal
Nasal		m	n				
Stop	voiceless	p	t	ts*	k	kʷ	
Stop	voiced	b	d	dz*	ɡ	ɡʷ	
Stop	aspirated	pʰ	tʰ		kʰ	kʰʷ	
Fricative			s				h
Approximant				j		w	
Trill			r				
Lateral			l				

Mycenaean preserves some archaic Proto-Indo-European and Proto-Greek features not present in later ancient Greek:

- labialized velar consonants [ɡʷ, kʷ, kʷʰ], written as ⟨q⟩ in transcriptions of the Mycenaean spelling system. In other ancient Greek varieties, labialized velars were replaced with labials /b, p, pʰ/, dentals /d, t, tʰ/, or velars /ɡ k kʰ/, depending on the context and the dialect. For example, Mycenaean 𐀦𐀄𐀒𐀫 (qo-u-ko-ro), pronounced gʷoukoloi, corresponds to classical Greek βουκόλοι boukóloi, "cowherds".
- The semivowels /j w/. Both were lost in standard Attic Greek, although /w/ was preserved in some Greek dialects and written as digamma ⟨ϝ⟩ or beta ⟨β⟩.
- The glottal fricative /h/ between vowels.

The voiceless and voiced affricates /ts/ and /dz/ (marked with asterisks in the table above), are hypothesized to have been used in the pronunciation of words written with ⟨z⟩ in transcriptions of the Mycenaean spelling system. Voiced /dz/ developed from Pre-Greek clusters of a voiced dental or velar stop + *y (*dy, *gy, *ɡʷy), or in certain instances from word-initial *y, and corresponds to ζ in the Greek alphabet. For example, the Mycenaean words 𐀕𐀿, 𐀵𐀟𐀼 (me-zo, to-pe-za), pronounced medzōs, torpedza, correspond to classical Greek μέζων, τράπεζα. Voiceless /ts/ developed from Pre-Greek clusters of a voiceless or voiceless aspirated velar stop + *y (*ky, *kʰy, *kʷy, kʷʰy) and corresponds to -ττ- or -σσ- in Greek varieties written in the Greek alphabet. The exact pronunciation of these consonants in Mycenaean is uncertain.

There were at least five vowels /a e i o u/, which could be both short and long.

As noted below, Mycenaean was written in a syllabic script called Linear B, which is extremely defective; meaning it does not represent all phonemic distinctions of the spoken language. Multiple consonants are represented by the same series of signs; the script only distinguishes semivowels ⟨j w⟩, the sonorants ⟨m n r⟩, the stops ⟨p t d k q⟩, the affricate ⟨z⟩, the sibilant fricative ⟨s⟩, and (marginally) the glottal fricative ⟨h⟩. In general, voiced, voiceless and aspirate occlusives are not distinguished in writing: for example, the Linear B character 𐀒, transcribed ⟨ko⟩, could represent any of the sequences /ɡo/, /ko/, and /kʰo/. The one exception to this principle is the use of a separate series of characters for the voiced dental stop /d/, transcribed ⟨d⟩, as opposed to the voiceless dental stops /t/ and /tʰ/ (both written with the same series of characters and transcribed as ⟨t⟩). Both /r/ and /l/ are written ⟨r⟩; /h/ is only inconsistently marked when followed by /a/, absent otherwise.

The length of vowels and consonants is not notated. In most circumstances, the script is unable to notate a consonant not followed by a vowel. Either an extra vowel is inserted (often echoing the quality of the following vowel), or the consonant is omitted. (See above for more details.)

Thus, determining the actual pronunciation of written words is often difficult, and using a combination of the PIE etymology of a word, its form in later Greek and variations in spelling is necessary. Even so, for some words the pronunciation is not known exactly, especially when the meaning is unclear from context, or the word has no descendants in the later dialects.

== Orthography ==
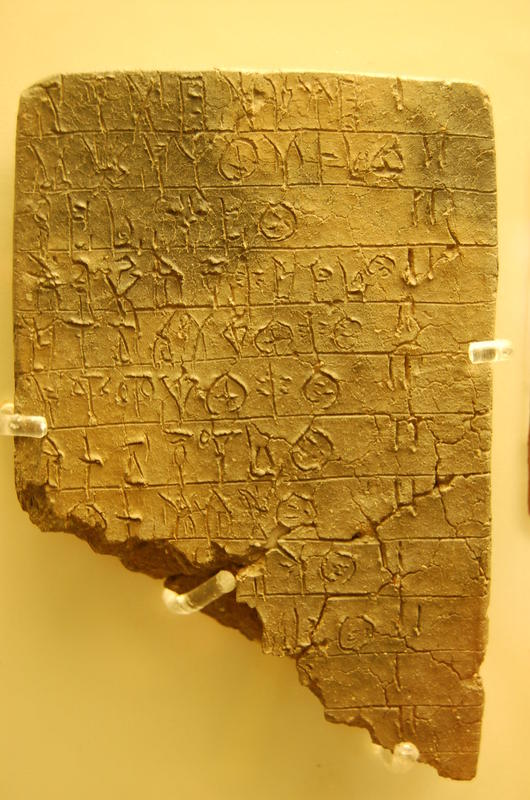
Mycenaean Greek inscription written in Linear B, Archaeological Museum of Mycenae

The Mycenaean language is preserved in Linear B writing, which consists of about 200 syllabic characters and ideograms. Since Linear B was derived from Linear A, the script of the undeciphered Minoan language, the sounds of Mycenaean are not fully represented. A limited number of syllabic characters must represent a much greater number of syllables used in spoken speech: in particular, the Linear B script only fully represents open syllables (those ending in vowel sounds), where Mycenaean Greek frequently used closed syllables (those ending in consonants).

Orthographic simplifications therefore had to be made:

- Contrasts of voice and aspiration were not marked for any consonants except the dentals d, t. For example, 𐀁𐀒, e-ko may be either egō ("I") or ekhō 'I have'.
- r and l are not distinguished: 𐀣𐀯𐀩𐀄, qa-si-re-u is gʷasileus (classical βασιλεύς basileús 'king').
- The rough breathing /h/ is generally not indicated: 𐀀𐀛𐀊, a-ni-ja is hāniai 'reins'. However, 𐁀, a_{2} is optionally used to indicate ha at the beginning of a word.
- The consonants l, m, n, r, s are omitted at the end of a syllable or before another consonant (including word-initial s before a consonant): 𐀞𐀲, pa-ta is panta 'all'; 𐀏𐀒, ka-ko is khalkos 'copper', 𐀲𐀵𐀗, ta-to-mo is σταθμός stathmós 'station, outpost'.
- Double consonants are not represented: 𐀒𐀜𐀰, ko-no-so is Knōsos (classical Knossos).
- Other consonant clusters are dissolved orthographically, creating apparent vowels: 𐀡𐀵𐀪𐀚, po-to-ri-ne is ptolin (Ancient Greek: πόλιν pólin or πτόλιν ptólin 'city (acc.)').
- Length of vowels is not marked.

Certain characters can be used alternately: for example, 𐀀, a, can always be written wherever 𐁀, a_{2}, can. However, these are not true homophones (characters with the same sound) because the correspondence does not necessarily work both ways: 𐁀, a_{2} cannot necessarily be used in place of 𐀀, a. For that reason, they are referred to as 'overlapping values': signs such as 𐁀, a_{2} are interpreted as special cases or "restricted applications" of signs such as 𐀀, a, and their use as largely a matter of an individual scribe's preference.

== Morphology ==
Nouns likely decline for 7 cases: nominative, genitive, accusative, dative, vocative, instrumental and locative; 3 genders: masculine, feminine, neuter; and 3 numbers: singular, dual, plural. Dative, locative and instrumental were already in the process of merging, which was completed by Classical Greek; however, a distinct instrumental plural ending -phi still remained. In Modern Greek, only nominative, accusative, genitive and vocative remain as separate cases with their own morphological markings.

Adjectives agree with nouns in case, gender, and number. The comparative degree is formed with the suffix -yos; the superlative is not attested.

Verbs probably conjugate for 3 tenses: past, present, future; 3 aspects: perfect, perfective, imperfective; 3 numbers: singular, dual, plural; 4 moods: indicative, imperative, subjunctive, optative; 3 voices: active, middle, passive; 3 persons: first, second, third; infinitives, and verbal adjectives. However, the attested forms include only 3rd person indicatives, with a majority of forms in the present tense, only a limited number of future and aorist attestations, and one perfect form. Infinitives in -hen, as well as active and passive participles are also attested.

The verbal augment is almost entirely absent from Mycenaean Greek with only one known exception, 𐀀𐀟𐀈𐀐, a-pe-do-ke (PY Fr 1184), but even that appears elsewhere without the augment, as 𐀀𐀢𐀈𐀐, a-pu-do-ke (KN Od 681). The augment is sometimes omitted in Homer.

== Sources ==
- Aura Jorro, Francisco (1985–1993). Diccinario micénico (in Spanish). Madrid: Consejo Superior de Investigaciones Cientificas, Instituto de Filología. 2 vols.
- Aura Jorro, Francisco (2017). "Reflexiones sobre el léxico micénico". In de la Villa, Jesús; Falque Rey, Emma; González Castro, José Francisco; Muñoz Jiménez, María José (eds.). Conuentus Classicorum: temas y formas del Mundo Clásico. Vol. 1. Sociedad Española de Estudios Clásicos. pp. 289–320. ISBN 978-84-697-8214-9.
- Bakker, Egbert J., ed. (2010). A companion to the Ancient Greek language. Oxford: Wiley-Blackwell.
- Bartoněk, Antonin (2003). Handbuch des mykenischen Griechisch. Heidelberg: Carl Winter. ISBN 3-8253-1435-9.
- Chadwick, John (1958). The decipherment of Linear B. Cambridge: Cambridge University Press.
- Chadwick, John (1990) [1958]. The Decipherment of Linear B (2nd ed.). Cambridge University Press. ISBN 0-521-39830-4.
- Chadwick, John (1976). The Mycenaean World. Cambridge University Press. ISBN 0-521-29037-6.
- Chadwick, John; Baumbach, Lydia (1963). "The Mycenaean Greek Vocabulary". Glotta. 41 (3/4): 157–271. JSTOR 40265918.
- Christidis, Anastasios-Phoivos, ed. (2007). A History of Ancient Greek: From the Beginnings to Late Antiquity. Cambridge: Cambridge University Press.
- Colvin, Stephen C. (2007). A Historical Greek Reader: Mycenaean to the Koiné. Oxford: Oxford University Press.
- Colvin, Stephen (2006). "Autosegmental Phonology and Word-Internal -h- in Mycenaean Greek". Glotta. 82: 36–54. JSTOR 40288084.
- Easterling, P. E.; Handley, Carol (2001). Greek Scripts: An Illustrated Introduction. London: Society for the Promotion of Hellenic Studies.
- Fox, Margalit (2013). The Riddle of the Labyrinth: The Quest to Crack an Ancient Code (1st ed.). New York: Ecco Press.
- Hooker, J. T. (1980). Linear B: An introduction. Bristol: Bristol Classical Press.
- Horrocks, Geoffrey (2010). Greek: A history of the language and its speakers (2nd ed.). Oxford: Wiley-Blackwell.
- Ittzés, Máté (December 2004). "The Augment in Mycenaean Greek". Acta Antiqua Academiae Scientiarum Hungaricae. 44 (2–4): 143–150. doi:10.1556/aant.44.2004.2-4.1.
- Janko, Richard (2018). "The Greek Dialects in the Palatial and Post-Palatial Late Bronze Age". Studies in Ancient Greek Dialects: From Central Greece to the Black Sea. De Gruyter. pp. 107–130. doi:10.1515/9783110532135-007. ISBN 978-3-11-053081-0.
- Jiménez Delgado, José Miguel (January 2009). "La situación de *h en griego micénico". Kadmos. 47 (1–2). doi:10.1515/KADMOS.2008.008. S2CID 161823908.
- Morpurgo Davies, Anna; Duhoux, Yves, eds. (1985). Linear B: A 1984 survey. Louvain, Belgium: Peeters.
- Morpurgo Davies, Anna; Duhoux, Yves, eds. (2008). A companion to Linear B: Mycenaean Greek texts and their world. Vol. 1. Louvain, Belgium: Peeters.
- Palaima, Thomas G. (1988). "The development of the Mycenaean writing system". In Olivier, J. P.; Palaima, T. G. (eds.). Texts, tablets and scribes. Suplementos a "Minos". Vol. 10. Salamanca: Consejo Superior de Investigaciones Científicas. pp. 269–342.
- Palaima, Tom (1988). The Scribes of Pylos. Incunabula Graeca. Vol. 87. Rome: Edizioni dell'Ateneo.
- Palmer, Leonard R. (1980). The Greek language. London: Faber & Faber.
- Risch, Ernst. Grammatik des mykenischen Griechisch. Ed. & expanded by Ivo Hajnal. Berlin: Walter de Gruyter, 2006. online here and here.
- Smodlaka Vitas, Sanja (7 January 2019). "Indoeuropsko naslijeđe u mikenskoj pomorskoj onomastici" [Indo-European Heritage in Mycenaean Maritime Onomastics]. Miscellanea Hadriatica et Mediterranea (in Croatian and English). 5: 9–30. doi:10.15291/misc.2744.
- Thompson, Rupert (2006). "Special vs. Normal Mycenaean Revisited". Minos. 37–38: 337–369.
- Thompson, Rupert (2024). "The Mycenaean Language". In Killen, John (ed.). The New Documents in Mycenaean Greek. Cambridge: Cambridge University Press. pp. 232–254. doi:10.1017/9781139029049.009. ISBN 978-1-139-02904-9.
- van Beek, Lucien (2022). "Greek" (PDF). In Olander, Thomas (ed.). The Indo-European Language Family: A Phylogenetic Perspective. Cambridge University Press. pp. 173–201. doi:10.1017/9781108758666. ISBN 978-1-108-49979-8. S2CID 161016819.
- Ventris, Michael; Chadwick, John (1953). "Evidence for Greek dialect in the Mycenaean archives". Journal of Hellenic Studies. 73: 84–103. doi:10.2307/628239. JSTOR 628239. S2CID 163873642.
- Ventris, Michael; Chadwick, John (1973) [1956]. Documents in Mycenaean Greek (2nd ed.). Cambridge University Press. ISBN 0-521-08558-6.
- Wiseman, Rob (2010). A Mycenaean Iliad: A linguistic reconstruction of the opening one hundred lines of the Iliad in Normal Mycenaean. London, United Kingdom.
