= Mycenology =

Linguistic study

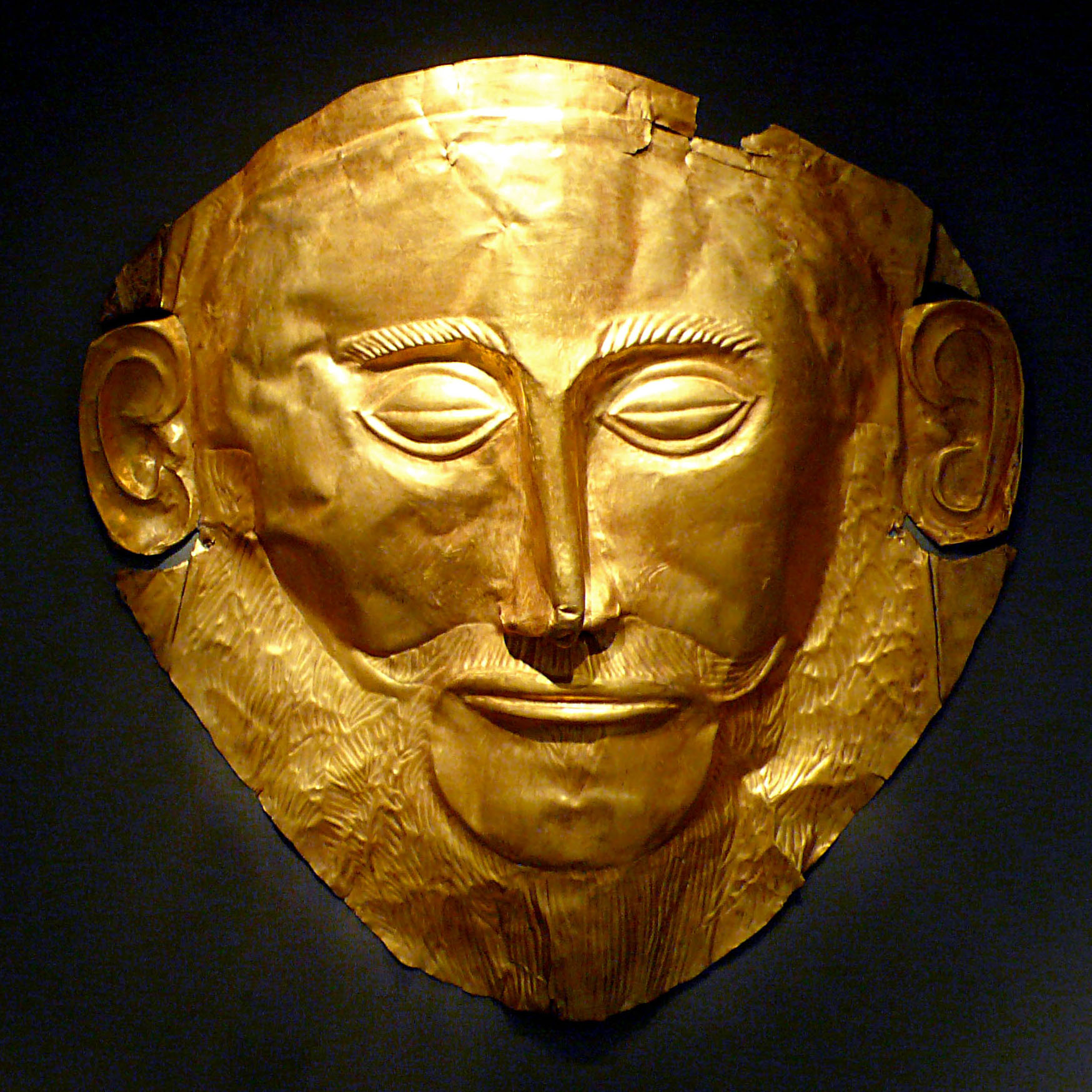
Death mask, known as the Mask of Agamemnon, Grave Circle A, Mycenae, 16th century BC, probably the most famous artifact of Mycenaean Greece.

Mycenology is the study of the Mycenaean Greek language and the culture and institutions recorded in that language. It emerged as a discipline auxiliary to classical philology in 1953, following the deciphering of Minoan Linear B script by Alice Kober, Michael Ventris and John Chadwick.
