= Manu Leumann =

Swiss Indo-Europeanist

Manu Leumann (1889–1977) was a Swiss Indo-Europeanist, son of Indologist Ernst Leumann. He was Reader at the Ludwig-Maximilians-Universität München from 1922 to 1926, and professor for Indo-European studies at the University of Zurich from 1927 to 1959.

== Publications ==
- Lateinische Laut- und Formenlehre 1927; 2nd ed. 1977
- Homerische Wörter 1950
- Morphologische Neuerungen im altindischen Verbalsystem 1952
- Kleine Schriften 1959, eds. H. Haffter, E. Risch, W. Rüegg
