= Manu Manek =

Indian stock broker (d. 1996)

Manu Manek was an Indian stock broker.

He earned the nickname "Black cobra", and was noted for his ability to uplift or break a stock.He was the one to compete with Harshad Mehta and Dhirubhai Ambani as a bear.

He died in 1996 due to liver dysfunction, leukemia and acute diabetes.

== See also ==
- Bombay Stock Exchange
