= Manu Daftary =

American money manager

- Education: University of Mumbai (BA); California State University, Long Beach (BS, MBA)
- Occupation: Money manager

Manu Daftary is an American money manager who manages the Quaker Strategic Growth Fund. In the ten years from 1997 to 2006, the fund beat the S&P 500 by an average of nine percent per year.

== Career ==
He began his investment management career at the University of Southern California in 1985 where he was Assistant Treasurer of Investments. In 1988, he joined Geewax, Terker & Company as a portfolio manager in 1988, where he co-managed the firm's institutional accounts and managed equity short selling for the firm's hedge fund assets. While at GT&C, he designed an option overlay program for its institutional accounts. He then worked at Hellman, Jordan Investment Management Company as a senior vice-president/portfolio manager, and had lead responsibility for $500 million in institutional assets. There, he also participated in the management of $150 million in hedge fund assets. Daftary started his own investment firm in 1996, DG Capital Management, of which he is president and CEO

== Education ==
Daftary has a Bachelor of Arts in economics from the University of Mumbai, India. He is also a graduate of California State University, Long Beach., where he received both a Bachelor of Science and Master of Business Administration.
