= Tripolis Larisaia =

Coordinates: 39°36′54″N 22°33′18″E

Tripolis (Ancient Greek: Τρίπολις, lit. 'three cities') or Tripolis Larisaia (Τρίπολις Λαρισαῖα), also called Scaea (Τρίπολις Σκαιὰ), was an ancient city in the Pelasgiotis in Thessaly, Greece, on the Peneus (Peneios) river, situated approximately 5 km to the east of Larissa.

During the Third Macedonian War, the Romans under Publius Licinius camped here on the march to Larissa (171 BCE).

Its site is tentatively located near Platykampos.

== See also ==
- List of Ancient Greek cities
