= Ernst Risch =

Swiss hellenist and philologist

Ernst Risch (1911–1988) was a Swiss hellenist and philologist.

He was professor of Indo-European studies at the University of Zurich.
