= List of New Amsterdam episodes =

Episode list for a medical drama television series

New Amsterdam is an American medical drama television series, based on the book Twelve Patients: Life and Death at Bellevue Hospital by Eric Manheimer, that premiered on NBC on September 25, 2018. The series was created by David Schulner and stars Ryan Eggold, Freema Agyeman, Janet Montgomery, Jocko Sims, Anupam Kher, Tyler Labine and Sandra Mae Frank.

During the course of the series, 89 episodes of New Amsterdam aired over five seasons, between September 25, 2018, and January 17, 2023.

== Series overview ==
Season	Episodes	Originally released	
Season	Episodes	First released	Last released
1	22	September 25, 2018	May 14, 2019
2	18	September 24, 2019	April 14, 2020
3	14	March 2, 2021	June 8, 2021
4	22	September 21, 2021	May 24, 2022
5	13	September 20, 2022	January 17, 2023

== Episodes ==
=== Season 1 (2018–19) ===
No. overall	No. in season	Title	Directed by	Written by	Original release date	U.S. viewers (millions)
1	1	"Pilot"	Kate Dennis	David Schulner	September 25, 2018	8.39
Dr. Maximus Goodwin, the new Medical Director at New Amsterdam hospital, begins his job by meeting with all of the staff. He fires the whole cardiothoracic surgical department and asks how he could help. The head of emergency department, Dr. Lauren Bloom, asks to eliminate the waiting room and send patients straight to beds. Dr. Iggy Frome, chief of psychiatry, asks for better food. Dr. Goodwin asks Dr. Bloom to take a biopsy of his throat. He hires Dr. Floyd Reynolds back, asking him to create a new Department of Cardiothoracic Surgery, and butts heads with the chief of oncology, Dr. Helen Sharpe. Dr. Bloom recognizes that a woman brought into ED is still alive. Neurosurgeon Dr. Kapoor focuses on talking to the patient and her husband. Dr. Bloom recognizes that a child from Africa may be presenting with Ebola. Dr. Frome is dealing with Jemma, a teenage patient who has been repeatedly abused.
2	2	"Rituals"	Peter Horton	David Schulner	October 2, 2018	7.44
Dr. Goodwin finds out that he has cancer and looks to Dr. Sharpe for help, although, every time she tries to explain things to him, he can't seem to make time for her. Dr. Frome and Dr. Kapoor attempt to help a pediatric patient. Dr. Bloom tries to convince Dr. Reynolds that they might have something that is worthwhile and that not dating her for her skin color is not right. Dr. Goodwin must deal with a crisis after his pregnant wife is admitted to the hospital with their unborn child's life in danger. As Dr. Sharpe continues to try to convince Dr. Goodwin to make a plan about his cancer diagnosis, he continues to try to convince her that, although bringing money into the hospital is important, they're in the business of saving lives and that is more important.
3	3	"Every Last Minute"	Jonas Pate	Shaun Cassidy	October 9, 2018	7.04
Dr. Fulton is unhappy with all the changes that Dr. Goodwin has been making at New Amsterdam. Dr. Frome and Dr. Kapoor try to diagnose a patient who believes he is dead and invisible, but they accidentally lose the patient, who wanders off. Dr. Bloom treats a patient that is an inmate at Rikers. The young inmate is pregnant and is desperate not to give birth while in prison. Dr. Goodwin gives the widow of a wealthy donor a tour of the hospital in hopes of convincing her to donate 10 million dollars to New Amsterdam, but instead convinces her to donate the money to fund a new nursery and a kangaroo care unit at Rikers Island for babies born to inmates in the prison.
4	4	"Boundaries"	Kate Dennis	David Foster	October 16, 2018	6.27
Dr. Frome is excited that his community garden has been funded, but is horrified that it is sponsored by Volt Cola. It is the annual cardiothoracic surgeon conference and Baptist's cardiothoracic surgeon suffers a medical emergency, forcing New Amsterdam to pick up the overflow, as Baptist cannot accept ambulances without a cardiothoracic surgeon. Dr. Bloom works to keep the ED running smoothly as they receive the additional patients. One of the residents accidentally takes her Adderall, which was hidden in an ibuprofen bottle. Dr. Sharpe deals with a young girl whose cancer has returned and is now terminal. Dr. Goodwin finds a homeless woman with an infected foot who at first rejects medical treatment, but then also asks Dr. Goodwin to help her brother.
5	5	"Cavitation"	Darnell Martin	Erika Green Swafford	October 23, 2018	6.37
A journalist visits New Amsterdam and is given full access to shadow Dr. Goodwin for the entire day. Dr. Goodwin's voice is hoarse and Dr. Sharpe agrees to run a test to see if his cancer has spread. Dr. Kapoor's son comes to visit him at the hospital. Dr. Sharpe visits a fertility doctor and learns that she is unlikely to have children without medical intervention. Two young boys come in with gunshot wounds. Initially, only one of them seems to be in critical condition but, as time progresses, the second boy's condition worsens. Despite their best efforts, the second boy dies. The journalist writes his article, which praises how hard the doctors worked to save the two boys' lives.
6	6	"Anthropocene"	Michael Slovis	Aaron Ginsburg	October 30, 2018	6.66
The doctors at New Amsterdam prepare for their annual fundraising gala. Dr. Frome's parents are in town and his daughter is excited to see them, but they end up not showing up, again, leaving Frome and his husband to explain to their daughter about how family can be the people you choose. Dr. Kapoor tries to give his gala tickets to Ella, but she misunderstands and believes he is inviting her to go with him. When she shows up later, he explains that he hadn't attended any of the galas since his wife passed, and he just needed a friend. Ella is touched and they enjoy the gala together. Dr. Fulton preps Dr. Goodwin for the gala and reiterates the importance of raising money for the hospital. Dr. Goodwin assures Fulton that he has a secret weapon to will get them the donations. Dr. Reynolds treats a Rikers inmate of an overdose. However, the inmate swears he doesn't do drugs and that the guards are drugging them. Dr. Reynolds and Dr. Goodwin are able to prove that one of the senior guards is drugging inmates she deems troublemakers without any regard to their safety. The warden fires her and notifies the police. Dr. Bloom, Dr. Kapoor, and Dr. Sharpe treat a father and son who begin displaying strange symptoms and later both the father and son have seizures. In the end it is determined that they contracted an unmutated version of a simple illness that had been released due to the melting icecaps where the father and son had vacationed. Once treated, both make full recovery. Georgia surprises Dr. Goodwin and attends the gala, managing to secure large donations, revealing to be the secret weapon that Dr. Goodwin told Dr. Fulton about. At the end of the night, Dr. Goodwin reveals his cancer diagnosis to her.
7	7	"Domino Effect"	Laura Belsey	Y. Shireen Razack	November 13, 2018	6.02
Dr. Goodwin and his wife Georgia talk to Dr. Sharpe about his cancer treatment. He has been putting off having his back molars removed, as they are in the way of the radiation that will be used. All of the doctors work to coordinate a domino surgery with two other hospitals. When the first donor pulls out, the entire domino surgery is put in jeopardy. A man and his daughter come in, with the daughter needing new lungs. However, since both are undocumented, UNOS can't accept her. Just when all hope seems lost, it's discovered the father is a match with the patient who would have received the first donor's kidney. With the father's willingness to donate to a complete stranger, they are able to go through with the domino surgery and also save his daughter's life as another family member of the recipients donates a part of their lung. Dr. Goodwin finally has his oral surgery to have his molars removed.
8	8	"Three Dots"	Jamie Payne	Cami Delavigne	November 20, 2018	5.82
Dr. Kapoor is handling a patient named Amy, a young Asian-American that has been suffering from migraines. He refers her to Dr. Frome after medication does not help, saying that the migraines may be stress induced. Her mother, however refuses, saying that Amy's headaches are not due to stress. Amy ends up jumping in front of an F train as they leave to go home and ends up back at the ER. Dr. Kapoor, Dr. Frome, and Dr. Goodwin work to try to figure out a way to get Amy the help she needs. Dr. Goodwin faces his own fears about his cancer when he becomes close to a patient that is a Rabbi. The Rabbi initially refuses his high risk surgery, but decides to move forward with it after Dr. Goodwin reveals to him that he has cancer. After Dr. Goodwin informs Dr. Sharpe that he wants to find a clinical trial instead of moving forward with the planned chemo and radiation, she says there are complications which would hurt his quality of life.
9	9	"As Long As It Takes"	Andrew McCarthy	Graham Norris	November 27, 2018	6.26
Dr. Sharpe looks into getting Dr. Goodwin in a clinical trial for his cancer. The trial director accepts Dr. Goodwin as a patient, but also asks her out on a date after they hit it off well with each other. Dr. Frome deals with a trans teen that is eager to have surgery to complete his transition, but his parents refuse. Meanwhile, Dr. Bloom is confronted about her exhaustion and the errors she has been making in the ER. Sarah, the woman that received Luna Goodwin's heart, is admitted to the hospital and it is determined she needs a new heart. Dr. Goodwin ends up becoming emotionally invested in her case. Out in a remote location to scatter the cremated remains of his sister's heart, Dr. Goodwin ends up collapsing while alone with Georgia.
10	10	"Six or Seven Minutes"	Stephen Kay	Laura Valdivia	January 8, 2019	5.35
Georgia performs a tracheotomy on Dr. Goodwin with Dr. Sharpe's guidance over telephone and Dr. Goodwin is taken to New Amsterdam. We see flashbacks to when Dr. Goodwin and Georgia met, their engagement, and what happened right before he took his new job at New Amsterdam. Everyone is informed by Dr. Sharpe of Dr. Goodwin's cancer diagnosis. Dr. Bloom hands Dr. Goodwin's case off to another ER doctor and eventually admits to Dr. Sharpe that she is exhausted from overworking and had planned to ask Dr. Goodwin for some time off. Meanwhile, Dr. Fulton takes over as temporary Medical Director. Dr. Reynolds performs a surgery that Dr. Fulton originally denied and offers to pay for it himself. The doctors realize how much Dr. Goodwin has impacted them and the hospital. Dr. Goodwin wakes up and decides to step down and go through with chemo, but all the doctors, including Dr. Fulton, want him to remain as Medical Director while receiving treatment and agree to help pick up the slack.
11	11	"A Seat at the Table"	So Yong Kim	Jiréh Breon Holder	January 15, 2019	5.61
Dr. Goodwin begins chemo, but refuses to sit for the three hour sessions, instead taking his IV pole with him as he continues to work. After a few days, he starts to feel fatigued from the chemo and finally admits to Dr. Sharpe that he doesn't want people to see him in a weakened state. At the same time, he tries to help save the hospital money by providing a homeless patient, whose frequent hospital visits have costs New Amsterdam over a million dollars in one year, an apartment. He realizes, though, that the patient simply likes being in the hospital and gives him a job. Dr. Frome works with a father whose son experiences hallucinations of a wolf attacking him. Dr. Sharpe tries to confront Dr. Bloom about her admission of being overworked. Dr. Reynolds is forced to admit to something that happened to him while he was an intern in Connecticut that a reporter digs up.
12	12	"Anima Sola"	Michael Slovis	Aaron Ginsburg	January 22, 2019	5.76
Dr. Frome reports a veteran surgeon at New Amsterdam who he believes is no longer capable of performing surgery. He and Dr. Goodwin end up having him stay on in a consulting role. Dr. Sharpe struggles with Dr. Bloom, who is still practicing even after admitting to abusing Adderall. They work on treating a group of vineyard workers that come in with similar symptoms. Dr. Sharpe has trouble putting faith in Dr. Bloom because of her admission and realizes that the relationship and work environment are no longer sustainable. She ends up reporting her to Dr. Goodwin. Dr. Kapoor and Dr. Reynolds work together to treat a mother who became blind after spending 9 months in the ICU as a result of giving birth to her daughter. Dr. Goodwin begins to feel nausea caused by his chemo and struggles to keep up with his day-to-day responsibilities. He has his first round of radiation and immediately feels soreness in his throat.
13	13	"The Blues"	Nick Gomez	David Foster	February 12, 2019	5.69
Dr. Bloom is required to be evaluated by Dr. Frome and eventually opens up about her family and how she left behind her struggling mother and younger sister to go to school in Washington instead of staying behind in New York to care for them. She reveals that her sister is in rehab and that she feels responsible for what happened. Dr. Goodwin tries to find employees at the hospital that are doing obsolete jobs, not to fire them, but to find them new jobs at the hospital. Dr. Kapoor struggles to figure out what is going on between his son and the woman at the coffee stand he likes. He ends up making the situation worse and breaks down in tears.
14	14	"The Forsaken"	Michael Slovis	Y. Shireen Razack	February 19, 2019	5.58
Dr. Bloom is on leave, so Dr. Candelario takes charge of the ED and implements new rules including a 10 minute limit to consult and diagnose for efficiency. Dr. Reynolds learns what happened to Dr. Bloom and goes to visit her. Dr. Sharpe finds a drug addict mother and her baby outside the hospital. The mother ends up giving up the baby, who is in withdrawal. Dr. Sharpe becomes attached to the baby girl and even considers adopting her, believing it's a sign from the universe as she is desperate to have children, but would have difficulty conceiving. However, the baby's father comes to claim his daughter, explaining that he only found out about her and his ex after it was too late. Dr. Sharpe learns that Dr. Panthaki has two children from a previous relationship. Dr. Goodwin works to save Dr. Fulton's job as Dean but, in the end, is unsuccessful. Dr. Fulton tells Dr. Goodwin that hiring him as Medical Director was the best thing he ever did and hopes that Dr. Goodwin can save the hospital.
15	15	"Croaklahoma"	Laura Belsey	Cami Delavigne	March 5, 2019	5.82
Dr. Goodwin finds it difficult to listen to his fellow chemo patients cracking jokes about their cancer and realizes that the reality of his diagnosis and prognosis has hit him hard. This spills over into the birthing class he attends with Georgia, as well as criticizing Dr. Sharpe after one of the chemo patients gets an infection. The Pope is at United Nations Headquarters giving an address, with New Amsterdam designated as the hospital to prepare in case of a papal health crisis, and the staff butts heads with his staff and security. Dr. Kapoor and Dr. Frome are detained after their actions and comments are accidentally interpreted as death threats to the Pope. Dr. Reynolds and Dr. Goodwin work to help a family that is struggling to pay for their son's anti-rejection medication after receiving a heart transplant. Dr. Sharpe finds herself overly involved in one of her patients after his legal guardian attempts to protect him from his girlfriend, who he believes does not have his best interests at heart.
16	16	"King of Swords"	Darnell Martin	Laura Valdivia	March 12, 2019	5.98
A historic blizzard hits New York City, crippling the infrastructure. Dr. Goodwin discovers that a nearby accident is making it impossible for ambulances to reach New Amsterdam and decides to send doctors and nurses, dispatched in teams of two, to the patients instead. Dr. Reynolds tries to save a man who slipped and impaled himself on a fence spike while rushing home to deliver his husband's insulin. Dr. Frome gets stuck on the roof with a suicidal patient while attempting to fix his weather antenna. Dr. Kapoor's patient ends up in critical condition and most likely won't survive through the night; he goes out in the blizzard to retrieve her husband. Dr. Goodwin and Dr. Sharpe help a woman who claims to be psychic and says things to both Dr. Goodwin and Dr. Sharpe which cause them to evaluate their relationship with each other. As they return to the hospital and Dr. Sharpe begins telling Dr. Goodwin how she feels, the hospital's power goes out. Meanwhile, Dr. Bloom struggles at rehab, dodging requests to help a patient that has overdosed and stealing medication.
17	17	"Sanctuary"	Jamie Payne	Shaun Cassidy & Erika Green Swafford	April 9, 2019	4.61
During a power outage, Dr. Goodwin and Dr. Sharpe attempt to calm patients. Their one maintenance worker activates a backup battery that will provide a floor of the hospital for a few hours and attempts to fix the backup generator, but is electrocuted. Dr. Reynolds with assistance from Dr. Candelario attempts open heart surgery without aid from machines while the power is out. Dr. Kapoor and Dr. Hartman are stuck in an elevator and attempt to help Agnes treat a new mother. Dr. Frome suggests asking a Rikers inmate that used to work for DWP who is at the hospital to help fix the generator. The inmate is reluctant at first, but eventually succeeds in getting the generator back up. Dr. Sharpe confronts Dr. Goodwin and admits that she cannot be his friend, doctor, and Deputy Medical Director, finding the combination of the duties too difficult to manage. She tells him that she will be passing his cancer treatment to another doctor.
18	18	"Five Miles West"	Kristi Zea	Graham Norris	April 16, 2019	4.47
Dr. Goodwin meets his new oncologist, Dr. Stauton, a no-nonsense woman that is not pleased at his inconsistent chemo and radiation schedule. She immediately schedules his next radiation treatment. Dr. Goodwin learns that the hospital plans to sell medical debt off and, to help, he instead has the former patients work off their bills by providing services to the hospital. He reschedules his radiation session and receives a rude awakening from Dr. Stauton about the reality of his situation. Dr. Sharpe and Dr. Reynolds attempt to diagnose a patient with cystic fibrosis, but soon discover she has stopped taking one of her medications. Dr. Frome and Dr. Goodwin try to reunite a father whose son was born unexpectedly at New Amsterdam after the surrogate mother required an emergency C-section and entered a coma. Their surrogacy contract that was signed in New Jersey is not recognized in New York and the mother's parents initially refuse to hand the child over, even though the child is not biologically their daughter's.
19	19	"Happy Place"	Ellen S. Pressman	Josh Carlebach & Jiréh Breon Holder	April 23, 2019	5.18
Dr. Stauton wants Dr. Goodwin to have a feeding tube inserted since he has lost weight because of the nausea resulting from his chemo and his throat being raw from radiation. He reluctantly agrees. An NYPD officer who was run over during a traffic stop arrives in the ED along with her partner and many of her colleagues. It is initially thought that the man who struck her was drunk behind the wheel, but Dr. Sharpe learns that he suffered a stroke and is ill. Dr. Reynolds performs the officer's surgery, but she doesn't make it. The officers decide to donate money their fallen comrade would've received to help pay for his treatment so he can recover. Dr. Kapoor and Dr. Frome work with a deaf patient who just received a cochlear implant. Dr. Frome faces the fact that Jemma no longer needs him.
20	20	"Preventable"	Thomas Carter	Aaron Ginsburg	April 30, 2019	5.24
The side effects of Dr. Goodwin's chemo worsen and he starts developing mood swings. Dr. Reynolds leads a morbidity and mortality (M&M) conference about the police officer that died in the previous episode, but Dr. Goodwin ends up insulting Dr. Reynolds in front of his colleagues and staff, causing a rift between the two. Dr. Sharpe sees Dr. Goodwin's mood has changed; she talks to Dr. Stauton and learns that Dr. Goodwin's cancer is not responding to the chemo or radiation. Dr. Reynolds realizes that Dr. Goodwin is having difficulty accepting that people can die for no reason and the two reconcile. He tells Dr. Goodwin to fight for his life and Dr. Goodwin agrees to do an experimental treatment that involves a double dosage of chemo. Dr. Kapoor deals with a patient leaving him poor reviews. Dr. Frome works with a patient whose mother has taken a new job in Missouri and is very reluctant to move back with her. The social worker assigned to the case believes that Dr. Frome's relationships with the boy and his other patients cross a line and files a formal complaint and investigation against him.
21	21	"This is Not the End"	Michael Slovis	David Foster	May 7, 2019	5.19
Dr. Goodwin has begun his new treatment and his tumor has begun to shrink, but he is gravely weakened by the double dose of chemo. He also creates a New Amsterdam family insurance plan, much to the dismay of Karen Brantley. Dr. Kapoor helps a mother and son both diagnosed with tuberculosis stay connected to their family. Dr. Sharpe and Ms. Dobbs begin their review of Dr. Frome and it becomes clear that his relationships with his patients go beyond normal therapeutic relationships. Dr. Frome admits that he is causing patients to only want to talk to him about such issues, making him rethink the way he treats his patients. Dr. Sharpe is taken aback by Dr. Goodwin's state and decides to find another means of treatment for him and send him home. Her re-commitment to Dr. Goodwin puts a strain on her relationship with Dr. Panthaki. Dr. Bloom returns with the intent of resigning and looks for Dr. Goodwin. She finally tracks him down to his apartment, where she finds him covered in blood.
22	22	"Luna"	Peter Horton	David Schulner	May 14, 2019	5.54
Georgia is bleeding out after her placenta ruptures, so Dr. Bloom and Dr. Goodwin work quickly to try to save her life as well as the unborn baby. Dr. Bloom is forced to perform a C-section before the ambulance arrives. Dr. Sharpe and the paramedics arrive in the nick of time to save Georgia's life. Dr. Frome and Dr. Kapoor are treating a man with severe PTSD from a pipe bomb explosion at a club. Dr. Frome struggles with not crossing any ethical barriers after accusations were brought against him, with Dr. Kapoor providing him with support and counsel. Dr. Reynolds brings Evie home for a family dinner with the intent of proposing with the family ring, but his mother questions the match. Without the support of his family, he proposes without a ring in the middle of the street. Nurse Acosta deals with an uncooperative lawyer who has ingested a balloon of cocaine. He realizes too late that the lawyer has escaped from police custody and commandeered an ambulance, which he crashes into the ambulance that was bringing Dr. Goodwin, Georgia, Luna, Dr. Sharpe, and Dr. Bloom to New Amsterdam. Dr. Goodwin appears to have survived the crash, simply dazed holding Luna. Someone is shown getting covered by a white sheet, but it's unknown who that person is.

=== Season 2 (2019–20) ===
No. overall	No. in season	Title	Directed by	Written by	Original release date	U.S. viewers (millions)
23	1	"Your Turn"	Michael Slovis	David Schulner	September 24, 2019	5.91
Three months since the accident, Dr. Goodwin goes to the hospital with Luna. Through flashbacks, the full aftermath of the accident is gradually shown. Dr. Sharpe survived after being thrown from the vehicle and has returned to fundraising. She reluctantly rehires her former colleague, Dr. Castro, who has been treating Dr. Goodwin. Dr. Bloom also survived and returns to work as the head of the ED, but is shown to be in extreme pain. Dr. Kapoor tries to overcome the stigma of being a senior doctor and successfully diagnoses a patient. Dr. Frome struggles with work-life balance and tells his husband that he wants to adopt another child. Dr. Reynolds attempts to keep in touch with his fiancée and mentors an intern. Dr. Goodwin throws himself back into work and helps a patient struggling to afford insulin. At the end, it is shown that, although Georgia survived the initial crash, there was a bleed in her brain and she fell unconscious, later dying on the operating table.
24	2	"The Big Picture"	Don Scardino	Jiréh Breon Holder	October 1, 2019	5.29
Dr. Goodwin continues to plow ahead forward and decides to hold a hospital wide census to get to know the staff and learn how to help them. He discovers that a majority of the staff are lacking time for themselves and their families, so he helps them to pool funds together to charter a bus that will cut down on commute time for the staff. Dr. Kapoor is worried that Dr. Goodwin is not grieving properly after losing Georgia, but realizes that he is in his own way. Dr. Sharpe hesitantly works with Dr. Castro to identify patients that can receive targeted therapy and reconnects with her Euchre patients after none of them are found to be eligible. Dr. Bloom struggles to deal with her leg pain without medication and ends up sleeping with her PT doctor. Dr. Reynolds works with one of his interns who makes a critical error while distracted in the ER. Dr. Frome attempts to start a class for Rikers inmates to improve their quality of life.
25	3	"Replacement"	Jamie Payne	Aaron Ginsburg	October 8, 2019	5.27
Dr. Goodwin interviews candidates to replace his former assistant, Dora, who left for a new job. He ends up hiring a veteran Todd, who desperately needs a job, over other qualified candidates. Dr. Reynolds finds himself performing a repeat surgery on a patient who injured herself. Dr. Goodwin attempts to start a visiting nurse service, but is shot down by the board. He then attempts to nominate a new board member who would side with him. He ends up successfully nominating Todd to the board. Dr. Frome and Dr. Kapoor deal with a unit outbreak, which seems to be caused by mass hysteria, but the original patient does not get better; it is revealed she had a benign brain tumor. Dr. Sharpe takes on a medical device company and their metal coated hip prosthetics, which can cause poisoning. Dr. Kapoor learns that his son has abandoned his pregnant girlfriend, Ella.
26	4	"The Denominator"	Michael Slovis	David Foster	October 15, 2019	4.95
Dr. Goodwin attempts to help the neighborhood after an African American man collapses from undiagnosed hypertension. He is met with resistance from the African American community when he tries to set up in a local barber shop to take blood pressure readings for the customers. He instead chooses to teach the barber how to take blood pressures and when to prescribe medication under his remote supervision. Dr. Bloom struggles with her pain management while still having sex with her physical therapist. Dr. Sharpe helps one of Dr. Castro's cancer patients take control of her life again. Dr. Frome and Dr. Kapoor take on the city after it ended up poisoning an entire neighborhood with lead paint. Dr. Kapoor is thrilled with the prospect of becoming a grandfather, but Ella reveals to him that she might not keep the baby.
27	5	"The Karman Line"	Nick Gomez	Laura Valdivia	October 22, 2019	5.13
Dr. Sharpe works with a patient who was diagnosed with cancer, but would like to have a baby. Her insurance, however, stopped covering surrogacy three weeks ago. Dr. Goodwin attempts to appeal to the insurance company, but has trouble finding the right person to talk to about the case. He finally connects with an appeals agent that helps him get the patient's surrogacy covered. Dr. Reynolds treats a patient that is about to be launched to the International Space Station and is desperate not to get grounded. Dr. Frome encounters a girl with psychopathic tendencies and tries to prevent her from being sent to corrections. Dr. Bloom finally has a breakthrough and decides to attend an NA meeting, only to run into Dr. Ligon.
28	6	"Righteous Right Hand"	Peter Horton	Erika Green Swafford	October 29, 2019	5.16
A church van is involved in a car accident right near New Amsterdam and the majority of the passengers are not seriously injured, but all of them seem to have other pre-existing conditions that the hospital proceeds to treat. Dr. Goodwin is suspicious and the driver of the van confesses that she took out the extra accident insurance with the intent of crashing the van to provide much needed health care to members of the congregation. Dr. Kapoor and Dr. Sharpe work to help mend relationships between two sisters, one of them needing a kidney from the other. Dr. Frome works with a young girl who is pregnant and desires an abortion, but her guardian opposes the procedure.
29	7	"Good Soldiers"	Rachel Leiterman	Shaun Cassidy	November 5, 2019	4.96
Dr. Sharpe realizes one of her patients, who is paralyzed due to what they believe was a tumor on her spine, was actually paralyzed by surgeon error, which was then covered up. Dr. Goodwin's investigation leads him to Dr. Fulton, who admits to the cover up. The patient threatens to sue the hospital, but is satisfied with the offered settlement. Dr. Bloom learns that she will need to take painkillers after her next surgery and struggles with the idea of relapsing. Dr. Reynolds decides to invite his father to his wedding after treating a young girl with leukemia who does not know her father is alive. Dr. Kapoor has one of his patients join Dr. Frome's group for veterans with PTSD.
30	8	"What the Heart Wants"	Don Scardino	Y. Shireen Razack	November 12, 2019	5.06
Dr. Sharpe is put in hot water when she tries to help a patient who has turned to heroin to ease her pain. A pregnant woman is forced to deliver her stillborn baby. Dr. Goodwin tries to comfort her and to get her to hold the child as an effort to say goodbye and grieve over the loss. Martin discovers Iggy's plans to try to adopt another child and an argument ensues. Dr. Goodwin finally lets go of his hallucinations of his dead wife.
31	9	"The Island"	Michael Slovis	Graham Norris	November 19, 2019	5.46
The team heads to Rikers Island to help prisoners and they have tough decisions to make as they deal with every situation on The Island. Dr. Goodwin and Dr. Sharpe diagnose a prisoner in solitary as not mentally ill, but under the effects of an illness. A brawl starts up and some prisoners end up hurt and headed to New Amsterdam. One of the prisoners says she was turning state's witness and that people want her dead. The episode ends with prisoners plotting.
32	10	"Code Silver"	Craig Zisk	Leah Nanako Winkler	January 14, 2020	4.98
Dr. Goodwin and Dr. Sharpe do whatever they can to help the hospital when the prisoners escape and cause a lockdown. Dr. Sharpe is taken off co-director duties and off the Chair of the Oncology for helping a patient access a safe site to inject. Ella is supported by Dr. Kapoor after she experiences panic attacks about being without her OCD meds while pregnant. Dr. Frome questions himself after an argument with his husband and is forced to see himself for what he is, ironically, by the therapist who he has just fired. Dr. Bloom has her surgery and, during the lockdown, must cut out a patient's appendix, even though standing will hurt her leg. Her physical therapist admits to taking her meds and she breaks up with him. The prisoners set out to try and kill the other prisoner turning state's witness. Dr. Reynolds is stabbed trying to protect her. Dr. Reynolds makes a decision about his girlfriend and mentions that maybe San Francisco would be a good place to live.
33	11	"Hiding Behind My Smile"	Lucy Liu	David Foster	January 21, 2020	4.71
Dr. Goodwin takes Luna in for her six-month well-child checkup and bonds with a fellow single parent. Right before going in for the appointment, he implements a new plan to not use any screens while talking to and treating patients, favoring active listening and earnest dialoguing. Dr. Sharpe struggles with having been demoted from her prior roles as department head and Dr. Goodwin's deputy director, but is still looked to by the other doctors as someone who can do as Dr. Goodwin would have done had he been present, which also impresses the head of the hospital's board of directors. Dr. Frome struggles with another psychiatrist's evaluation of him and his self-loathing by eating an unhealthy amount of snack cakes. Dr. Reynolds manages to tell Dr. Goodwin that he plans to leave New Amsterdam to be with his fiancée, with Dr. Goodwin only understanding enough to agree to work around his situation. Dr. Bloom finds a good use for her family's money after meeting an elderly fellow named Eli (guest star Austin Pendleton). With the help of Dr. Sharpe, Dr. Reynolds operates on a marine who has a very unusual blood type that doesn't accept normal blood transfusions. Dr. Kapoor offers his house for Ella to stay in instead of going to Idaho with her parents. It doesn't go well at the start and Dr. Kapoor must makes changes.
34	12	"14 Years, 2 Months, 8 Days"	Seith Mann	Aaron Ginsburg	January 28, 2020	4.87
Dr. Goodwin takes strides with having a playdate, not a real date, for Luna. We see flashbacks of Dr. Kapoor treating a patient who has been in a coma for 14 years and how the family deals with that. The ED is in chaos when the system is being updated and they resort to using paper and pen instead. A young honors kid has a brush with death because of vaping. Dr. Castro is a little too selective in her new trial which upsets Dr. Sharpe, who Castro reminds has no voice, as she was demoted. A woman with colitis mentions self harm and Dr. Frome and Dr. Sharpe tweak the facts to help her.
35	13	"In the Graveyard"	Darnell Martin	Josh Carlebach	February 11, 2020	4.47
Upon discovering hospitals tend to shunt dying patients around to keep their mortality rates down, Dr. Goodwin creates a palliative care wing in New Amsterdam, humorously dubbed the graveyard.
36	14	"Sabbath"	Ryan Eggold	Teleplay by : David Schulner; Story by : Marc Gaffen & David Schulner	February 18, 2020	4.71
A woman comes in after hitting her head and her mysterious disease moves at a rapid speed. Dr. Goodwin is forced to cut $2 million from the hospital budget. Dr. Frome and Dr. Sharpe work to figure out the cause of a young boy's tumors.
37	15	"Double Blind"	Allison Liddi-Brown	Shaun Cassidy	February 25, 2020	5.16
Dr. Goodwin tries to find a way to end the opioid crisis at the behest of the Head Board Chair. Dr. Frome meets with an engaged couple who recently discovered that they were related. Dr. Sharpe believes that Dr. Castro is skewing the results of her drug study. Dr. Goodwin takes a step towards something more with Alice. Dr. Bloom confronts her mother about being horrible for the last 15 years, but it does not end well. Vejay tries to fix an elderly fellow, but his symptoms don't check out with his personality.
38	16	"Perspectives"	Craig Zisk	Y. Shireen Razack	March 10, 2020	4.44
Dr. Goodwin's relationship with Alice steps up. Dr. Frome speaks with a girl who is traumatized by a "school shooting drill." Dr. Bloom deals with her past regarding her mother's alcoholism and worries that her drug use may have the same effect. Dr. Bloom, Dr. Reynolds, and Dr. Goodwin are all served and have pre-disposition meetings through Evie which, even though they are not guilty, makes them seem like they are. Vejay gets superstitious about Ella's new black cat. Valentina's trial goes badly and Dr. Sharpe gives her an out from New Amsterdam.
39	17	"Liftoff"	Kristi Zea	Graham Norris	March 17, 2020	5.20
People are surprised that Dr. Reynolds is still there, as they assumed he had left already. He discovers, and is inadvertently trapped in, an elevator shaft with a young man who is bleeding out. Dr. Goodwin looks for an alternative to crowdfunding, as he believes it is unfair. Dr. Sharpe prepares for a "Fight Cancer" charity event and discovers how the young cancer survivors feel. In the end, everyone bids a fond farewell to Dr. Reynolds as he leaves New Amsterdam for San Francisco.
40	18	"Matter of Seconds"	Dinh Thai	Aaron Ginsburg	April 14, 2020	6.03
This episode opens with a message from actors Ryan Eggold and Daniel Dae Kim, explaining that "Matter of Seconds" replaced the scheduled episode "Pandemic," because its events were too similar to the actual COVID-19 pandemic. Scenes featuring Kim's character Dr. Cassian Shin from "Pandemic" were shown to introduce viewers to the character ahead of his appearance in this episode. Drs. Sharpe, Shin, and Bloom try to figure out why the heart rates of multiple ED patients keep suddenly dropping. Dr. Frome undertakes a psychological assessment under New York's red flag law, but his patient accuses him of letting his own feelings about gun control cloud his judgement. Dr. Goodwin helps a couple whose son has Duchenne muscular dystrophy; watching how they interact as a family leads him to break up with Alice, saying it's unfair to their kids to keep pretending that they're a real family.

=== Season 3 (2021) ===
No. overall	No. in season	Title	Directed by	Written by	Original release date	U.S. viewers (millions)
41	1	"The New Normal"	Peter Horton	David Schulner	March 2, 2021	4.19
New Amsterdam returns amidst the COVID-19 pandemic and the staff must act quickly to save who they can. In the pandemic, life is determined by social distancing, intensive protection measures and online meetings. Dr. Kapoor is hanging in the balance and no one knows if he's going to make it. Dr. Goodwin calls Dr. Reynolds for cardiological support, who asks "How can I help?" An airplane makes an emergency landing on the nearby East River and the staff of New Amsterdam needs to treat multiple victims.
42	2	"Essential Workers"	Michael Slovis	David Foster	March 9, 2021	4.23
The staff of New Amsterdam struggles with the various effects of the COVID-19 pandemic. Dr. Reynolds comes back to New Amsterdam to do the surgery of Dr. Kapoor after his COVID infection. Dr. Bloom takes care of Dr. Frome, who hasn't been eating to suppress his eating disorder. Ella is nervous about her pregnancy, as the birth plan is suddenly brought up two weeks. Dr. Goodwin wants to provide pain patients with painkillers and encounters resistance because of the opioid crisis and he has to balance the risk of opioid abuse with the needs of the patients. Dr. Frome undergoes a zero diet and Dr. Bloom is worried. She wants to help him. Ella, carrying the child of Dr. Kapoor's son, goes into labor three weeks before due date. This troubles her deeply.
43	3	"Safe Enough"	Michael Slovis	Shaun Cassidy	March 16, 2021	3.64
Dr. Goodwin clamors about bringing Luna home. He shows everyone videos of her "not walking." Dr. Sharpe breaks down while filming a PSA. Dr. Reynolds' mother is treated at New Amsterdam for diabetes. He deals with family issues, which later results in Evie ending their engagement. Dr. Frome struggles with online conferences in the New Amsterdam system glitching. He helps a young girl whose overprotective parents believe she should never go outside during the ongoing pandemic. A woman is brought into the ED with a broken wrist by her female taxi driver, who turns out to know a bit about medicine.
44	4	"This is All I Need"	Nick Gomez	Aaron Ginsburg	March 23, 2021	3.96
Dr. Goodwin slowly comes to accept the death of Georgia. Dr. Sharpe gets devastating news and tries to heal. Cassian eventually helps her grieve. Dr. Kao struggles with taking over the neurology department after Dr. Kapoor's departure. After a patient goes rogue in the ED, Dr. Bloom feels forced to strengthen security there. Her first attempt, hiring police officers, causes backlash with the staff, who believe that having officers as security will cause problems regarding various patients. In the end, she comes up with a solution when a former bouncer helps stop another rogue patient. She has New Amsterdam hire former bouncers who lost their jobs during COVID. Dr. Frome helps a woman who disbelieves a young man that claims to be her son. It is sadly revealed that the woman suffered a brain injury while her son was at a camp, resulting in her no longer being able to recognize him as her son. Dr. Bloom hides Leyla in a closet. Dr. Goodwin is finally able to bring Luna home.
45	5	"Blood, Sweat & Tears"	Nick Gomez	Y. Shireen Razack	March 30, 2021	3.44
Dr. Frome gets treated for his eating disorder and struggles with effectively participating. Dr. Goodwin deals with an acute shortage of blood reserves. For support he hires Sandra Fall from billing who was fired. A creative initiative to attract blood donors is started. Dr. Bloom keeps hiding Leyla Shinwari in the ED closet and "talks jazz" with Dr. Reynolds as she is storing medicine in unusual places. They find further opportunities for improvisation. Dr. Frome gathers veterans to talk about their issues in a group session. Chance, a patient from this group, is accused to fake his identity as a soldier. Dr. Kao takes care of an Asian patient who suddenly has turned blind. Dr. Sharpe treats a girl who has a different blood type than her mother.
46	6	"Why Not Yesterday"	Darnell Martin	Laura Valdivia	April 6, 2021	3.60
Dr. Frome is pushed to his limits while dealing with a kid who seems to be hurt. He later confronts two girls who are friends and tries to make sense of it. Meanwhile, Max tries to make the hospital a better place for everyone and hands the Medical Director position to Dr. Sharpe, who is dealing with a family matter. The staff tends to several people who were in an accident and one of the people involved is a man who only goes by the name "Superman." Also, Dr. Reynolds deals with an issue involving his mom and tries to keep everything under control.
47	7	"The Legend of Howie Cournemeyer"	Darnell Martin	Graham Norris	April 13, 2021	3.37
Dr. Goodwin gives a eulogy for a former medical director of New Amsterdam, Dr. Helms. Dr. Helms had some secrets in his past, though. Luna gets banned from daycare because she bites and Dr. Goodwin needs to look for alternatives. Dr. Kapoor is expected to come back to New Amsterdam after his COVID sickness and Dr. Frome organizes a "Welcome Back" party, but Dr. Kapoor does not show up. Dr. Sharpe's Iranian niece comes to live with her, one day early. A Mormon missionary comes in and receives a positive HIV test result. This upsets him.
48	8	"Catch"	Shiri Appleby	Erika Green Swafford	April 20, 2021	3.73
Dr. Sharpe and her Iranian niece Mina have different views on daily life. Several pregnant women from Southwest hospital transfer to New Amsterdam. Dr. Bloom is still accommodating Leyla in the ED closet. She later has to deal with a woman who keeps denying her obvious pregnancy. A pregnant lawyer, famous for forcing obstetrics departments to close down in court, comes to New Amsterdam requesting a VBAC.
49	9	"Disconnected"	Lisa Robinson	Allen L. Sowelle	April 27, 2021	3.10
Dr. Shinwari has moved in with Dr. Bloom. Dr. Frome meets a new patient who pretends to have served in the military. A father brings in his daughter with a gunshot wound and claims that she was shot from a car. Dr. Reynolds has serious doubts about that story. Dr. Goodwin has to deal with fake coronavirus cures, as a number of patients that live in the same building arrive with the same symptoms. After talking to the one tenant who didn't take the fake cure, as her son researched it for her and told her it was fake, Goodwin realizes that the patients' lack of access to the internet is causing them to fall prey to scammers. A happy couple wants to take a trip on Route 66. Dr. Sharpe explains how they can do this with his cancer coming back.
50	10	"Radical"	Darnell Martin	Shanthi Sekaran	May 4, 2021	3.02
Dr. Shinwari is living with Dr. Bloom. She passes the medical board examination and happily kisses Dr. Bloom over this news. Dr. Lucille starts her work as the new Chair of Neurology and overturns everything Dr. Kapoor implemented. Dr. Kao has second thoughts about hiring Dr. Lucille. Dr. Sharpe's niece is living with her and Dr. Sharpe looks for a job for Mina. A history professor with a native American background (namely the Lenape tribe) criticizes the naming of New Amsterdam and refuses to get treated, so Dr. Goodwin makes a proposal to the board of directors. Dr. Reynolds gets closer with Dr. Malvo and exchanges music playlists with her. Dr. Bloom treats a patient with lung problems and very unusual relationships.
51	11	"Pressure Drop"	Michael Slovis	Josh Carlebach	May 11, 2021	3.27
New York is in an intense heatwave. Dr. Goodwin is worried about climate change and wants to implement effective actions, not only in his private life, but also at New Amsterdam. He is surprised to discover the amount of garbage New Amsterdam produces. Dr. Bloom spends a week off with Dr. Shinwari and returns to New Amsterdam with a changed attitude. Dr. Sharpe and Mina, her niece, struggle with their relationship. Dr. Frome confronts Chance and wants him to stop contacting him or his husband. Dr. Bloom gets a patient who claims he can control the weather and Dr. Frome, whose hobby is weather analysis, enthusiastically takes over. Dr. Bloom also treats a nun who, in the heatwave, keeps feeling cold. Dr. Reynolds takes a child that was forgotten by his father in a closed car to the hospital.
52	12	"Things Fall Apart"	Darnell Martin	Graham Norris & Y. Shireen Razack	May 18, 2021	3.09
Dr. Frome keeps struggling with Chance contacting his family. Dr. Bloom treats a woman who accidentally impaled herself on her pruning shears, when suddenly the roof of the ED bursts, causing a lot of debris and liquid to hit everyone. The liquid is a chemical that harms the skin and lungs and also causes blindness. Dr. Goodwin finds the source of the liquid and gets into a precarious situation. Dr. Frome meets with a group of parents who visit their children at the psychiatric ward. He consults with two women who struggle with the aggressive behavior of their child.
53	13	"Fight Time"	Michael Slovis	Shaun Cassidy & Laura Valdivia	June 1, 2021	3.95
Max comes into conflict with his in-laws over custody of his daughter Luna. Dr. Frome has caught a cold and stays at home in bed. He gets an unwelcome visit. Dr. Reynolds opens up to Dr. Bloom about his relationship with Dr. Malvo. He then treats a young heart transplant recipient with a very special condition whom he has known since her birth. Another patient in the ED has dioxin poisoning and is behaving suspiciously, fascinating Casey. Dr. Goodwin fights to get 1,000 COVID vaccines applied which threaten to become unusable.
54	14	"Death Begins in Radiology"	Peter Horton	David Foster & Aaron Ginsburg	June 8, 2021	4.10
Dr. Goodwin and Dr. Sharpe intensify their relationship. All of a sudden, he misplaces his wedding ring. Dr. Bloom and Dr. Reynolds treat a patient stabbed with a toy sword. After the surgery, he gets promoted by Dr. Baptiste to deputy chair of surgery, only to learn that Dr. Baptiste and Dr. Malvo are married. Dr. Shinwari gets a spot on the residency match list and plans to move to Spokane, Washington. Dr. Bloom is devastated. Dr. Frome takes his whole family hiking and they have some meaningful talks. Before leaving London, Dr. Sharpe has a talk with her mother and brings her to the hospital where Dr. Sharpe volunteered during medical school to treat her severe cough. Eventually, Dr. Sharpe and Dr. Goodwin walk together from New Amsterdam.

=== Season 4 (2021–22) ===
No. overall	No. in season	Title	Directed by	Written by	Original release date	U.S. viewers (millions)
55	1	"More Joy"	Michael Slovis	David Schulner	September 21, 2021	3.72
Max and Helen sleep together and then have to navigate their new relationship. Things get complicated when Helen decides that her future is in London, but the two agree to try. In the hospital, an arsonist blows up two rooms and Iggy has to enlist the aid of an inmate to help him profile the unknown criminal. However, the inmate pushes Iggy to the limit during the investigation and he has to realize some truths about himself. Bloom welcomes some new interns to the ED, one of whom is Leyla, who resents her preferential treatment. Floyd and Lyn have to redefine their relationship as Floyd continues to work with Lyn's husband, Dr. Baptiste.
56	2	"We're in This Together"	Darnell Martin	David Foster	September 28, 2021	3.55
The new relationship of Dr. Sharpe and Dr. Goodwin is discovered by Casey Acosta, but he is not believed. Dr. Bloom and Leyla face envy from the other interning doctors in the ED over Dr. Bloom's treatment of Leyla. Dr. Frome is training his resident doctors by letting them simulate interaction with patients. He monitors them very closely. They eventually run out on him. The ICU is suddenly without doctors and Dr. Goodwin jumps in. Dr. Sharpe treats a patient who had an accident while climbing a mountain. Dr. Malvo restates that she does not see her relationship with Dr. Reynolds as adultery. Dr. Goodwin and Dr. Sharpe eventually announce that they will be leaving New Amsterdam together for London.
57	3	"Same as It Ever Was"	Nick Gomez	Aaron Ginsburg	October 5, 2021	2.86
New Amsterdam staff contemplate Dr. Goodwin and Dr. Sharpe going to London. Dr. Goodwin encourages a young student pursuing an amazing invention. This triggers some serious complications. One of Dr. Frome's residents has to deal with a patient committing suicide. Dr. Bloom and Dr. Reynolds treat several gun shot victims. A mysterious person is walking through New Amsterdam and keeps asking the department heads questions.
58	4	"Seed Money"	Nestor Carbonell	Erika Green Swafford	October 12, 2021	3.30
Dr. Goodwin is appalled by Dr. Fuentes becoming the new medical director at New Amsterdam. Karen Bruntley wants them to decide together about an empty piece of land that was donated to New Amsterdam. He and Dr. Sharpe want to use the five weeks remaining for them at New Amsterdam to leave a lasting impression before they leave for London. Dr. Sharpe notices that women get letters after a mammogram that do not encourage follow up. Dr. Reynolds treats a girl from a dance group who had sudden kidney pain during rehearsal.
59	5	"This Be the Verse"	Lisa Robinson	Graham Norris	October 19, 2021	3.42
Dr. Fuentes starts rearranging several things that Dr. Goodwin previously installed, including the new logo for the hospital: "NAH." Dr. Bloom's mother (guest star Gina Gershon) shows up at New Amsterdam for the treatment of her pain and meets her very reluctant daughter. Dr. Fuentes organizes an exhibition of Burmese cultural objects in the entrance lobby. It contains a Burmese music instrument which is claimed by a lady from Burma. Dr. Sharpe has a confrontation with Dr. Frome about the reliability of recovered memories.
60	6	"Laughter and Hope and a Sock in the Eye"	Darnell Martin	Laura Valdivia	October 26, 2021	3.53
In the absence of Dr. Fuentes, Dr. Goodwin lives out a positive mood, allowing anything that is requested of him. It's his "day of yes." Dr. Malvo and Dr. Reynolds confess their relationship to her husband, Dr. Baptiste. A comedian duo is admitted to the emergency room and Dr. Bloom helps them organize care. Dr. Frome deals with two patients wanting to get married while their families object. An old friend of Dr. Sharpe's is treated for pancreatic cancer at New Amsterdam. It is a very complicated surgery for which talented, deaf Dr. Wilder is invited to perform. She organizes a big team with people of her own and Dr. Goodwin, Dr. Reynolds, and Dr. Sharpe supporting.
61	7	"Harmony"	Dinh Thai	Shaun Cassidy	November 2, 2021	2.81
Dr. Malvo, Dr. Baptiste, and Dr. Reynolds try to find a way to move forward with their triangle relationship. Dr. Fuentes wants Dr. Frome to see patients again, which makes him panic. Dr. Goodwin tells Dr. Sharpe that he does not want her to meet his parents. A New Amsterdam ambulance is traveling at excessive speeds and causes an accident. The cause is related to Dr. Fuentes. Dr. Sharpe and Dr. Kao treat a girl who had a stroke because of her sickle cell anemia.
62	8	"Paid in Full"	Shiri Appleby	Aaron Ginsburg	November 9, 2021	3.07
The department heads feel pressure from Dr. Fuentes. Dr. Sharpe and Dr. Goodwin are preparing to depart for London. Dr. Fuentes asks Dr. Goodwin to co-sign a budget that will lead to the dismissal of many employees, including some department heads. Dr. Frome struggles with meeting patients face to face again. New Amsterdam is attacked with a ransomware virus and Dr. Goodwin and Dr. Fuentes need to solve the issue together, as the computer controlled departments are hit hard and patients start suffering.
63	9	"In a Strange Land"	Michael Slovis	Shanthi Sekaran	November 16, 2021	3.23
After several nurses and assistants are laid off because of Dr. Fuentes' cost-cutting measures, doctors struggle with things they had not had to take care of previously. Dr. Bloom's emergency department treats several patients from a church fire who are all undocumented immigrants. Nurse Brunstetter and Dr. Sharpe help a transgender man who was traumatized by disrespectful treatment. Dr. Frome meets a young woman who tells him about her talks with God.
64	10	"Death is the Rule. Life is the Exception"	Allison Liddi-Brown	Teleplay by : Marc Gaffen & David Schulner; Story by : Marc Gaffen	November 23, 2021	3.33
Dr. Max Goodwin and Dr. Helen Sharpe work their last day at New Amsterdam Medical Center. The tension between Reynolds and Baptiste gets even more complicated when Malvo reveals she is pregnant. Ten patients die after being exposed to antibiotic-resistant bacteria, and Dr. Frome works with a couple who lost their son to the bacteria. Leyla confronts Bloom over her bribe, which leads to the end of their relationship.
65	11	"Talkin' Bout A Revolution"	Nick Gomez	Graham Norris	January 4, 2022	3.27
Dr. Bloom treats a patient who seems to be haunted by bad luck, as if he were cursed. Dr. Fuentes presents to the heads of department her new programs for cost reduction. Nevertheless, she installs a new department: holistic medicine. Dr. Wilder wants to start a clandestine "résistance" of the department heads against Dr. Fuentes, but she gets little support. Dr. Sharpe and Dr. Goodwin have arrived in London and start to get comfortable in their apartment. Dr. Sharpe starts her work as medical director at NHS Hampstead Hospital. Dr. Goodwin cannot yet work as a doctor in the UK and so starts as a receptionist.
66	12	"The Crossover"	Rachel Leiterman	Mona Mansour	January 11, 2022	3.13
Dr. Goodwin tries to find a job as a doctor in London, but keeps getting refused. Dr. Reynolds and Dr. Baptiste take care of the pregnant Dr. Malvo. Dr. Bloom struggles getting over the separation from Dr. Shinwari. Dr. Castries is transferred to the oncology department of Dr. Wilder and enters the "résistance." Dr. Frome accompanies a police officer on her tour, as she is required to do a check-in with him. Dr. Bloom treats a very passionate football fan. Dr. Wilder treats Willow, a former cancer patient of Dr. Sharpe's, who does not trust her new doctor.
67	13	"Family"	Olenka Denysenko	David Foster	January 18, 2022	3.45
Dr. Goodwin helps a soccer player and taxi drivers in London with their itches and finger problems. Dr. Frome meets a man in the ED who tries to pick up the reception desk. The man turns out to be Dr. Wilder's younger, psychotic brother. She explains the background to Dr. Frome. Dr. Sharpe struggles with the differences she has with her mother and organizes a lunch with herself, Dr. Goodwin, and her mother. Dr. Bloom is worried about Dr. Shinwari, as she cannot reach her. A man with a badly injured leg is brought into the ED together with his wife and their incessantly crying baby.
68	14	"...Unto the Breach"	Stephen Kay	Allen L. Sowelle	January 25, 2022	3.31
The doctors learn that Dr. Kapoor has passed and hold a memorial. Dr. Goodwin participates and learns about the changes Dr. Fuentes has initiated. The surgeons are forced to do routine surgeries; Dr. Reynolds starts to blur all the patients together. Dr. Wilder tells him and Dr. Sharpe about her "vive la résistance" against Dr. Fuentes and eventually they do a clandestine surgery together. It does not end well, though. Dr. Frome has an 8 year old patient who wants to be emancipated from his parents. Dr. Bloom and Dr. Shinwari talk back and forth about their relationship. Rohan, the son of Dr. Kapoor, is brought into the ED and Dr. Bloom treats him for overdose.
69	15	"Two Doors"	Ryan Eggold	Aaron Ginsburg	February 22, 2022	2.83
Dr. Goodwin and chairwoman Brantley try to get leverage on Dr. Fuentes to make her leave New Amsterdam. Dr. Goodwin tries to get hired at a company doing medical services for New Amsterdam. He asks his former close colleagues to join him, but they are reluctant. Dr. Frome consults with a father and son, at whose job there was a shooting that the father thinks was a hoax. Dr. Reynolds treats a woman driving long haul truck transports. She has cancer that needs a specialist surgeon. It turns out that Dr. Fuentes is just such a surgeon and we learn about her past. Dr. Sharpe is working in London and maintains her long distance relationship with Dr. Goodwin. Dr. Wilder treats a man with terminal cancer and tries to make his wish come true to keep living until the wedding ceremony of his daughter.
70	16	"All Night Long"	Nestor Carbonell	Laura Valdivia	April 19, 2022	3.04
The crew of New Amsterdam meets for a karaoke night. They have a lot of fun, sing many songs together, and have a lot of drinks. The episode tells what each of them experiences at the party and after leaving. Dr. Wilder wants the party to continue and looks for a companion. Dr. Frome and Trevor leave together. Dr. Castries leaves alone on her bicycle and goes to her favorite spot on the Hudson River. Dr. Goodwin and Dr. Sharpe go to her place. The next day, some of them do not show up at the hospital. Dr. Goodwin and Dr. Frome treat a patient who keeps changing his name.
71	17	"Unfinished Business"	Andrew Voegeli	David Foster	April 26, 2022	3.29
Everyone searches for the colleagues who did not show up the day after the party. Dr. Goodwin finds Dr. Sharpe on the floor in her apartment and gets her back to the hospital; she has several blood clots. Dr. Frome eventually manages to contact Trevor, who is in Baptist hospital. He is worried about what may have happened between them, leading to hard discussions with his husband Martin. Dr. Castries is found unconscious at the Hudson River below the place where she went from the party. Dr. Reynolds and Dr. Walsh argue about how to revitalize her. Dr. Bloom and Dr. Shinwari go outside to find Casey. Dr. Shinwari opens up to Lauren that she is having trouble with her immigration status and needs money for a lawyer. They eventually find Casey in a small alley with a screwdriver stuck in his neck. Dr. Wilder is found in her apartment on the floor, unconscious. She goes back to the bar to confront the bartender. Dr. Reynolds and Dr. Malvo talk about the future of their relationship.
72	18	"No Ifs, Ands or Buts"	Rachel Leiterman	Graham Norris	May 3, 2022	3.41
After her embolic stroke, Dr. Sharpe struggles to recover, visiting a speech therapist. Dr. Frome wants to reconcile with Martin, so he suggests they meet a couples' counselor. Dr. Reynolds finds his father's old car. A patient of his refuses to get follow-up surgery for his cancer, because it is not covered by his insurance. Dr. Shinwari repays Dr. Bloom's loan. Dr. Bloom asks Casey for a consult on her situation. She later gets a patient with strong stomach pains who runs a calzone restaurant. Dr. Frome deals with a sociopathic girl and her involvement with the other kids in the psychiatric ward.
73	19	"Truth Be Told"	Jean E. Lee	Shaun Cassidy & Brandy E. Palmer	May 9, 2022	2.43
Dr. Sharpe is worried about the health of her mother, who is very reluctant to let her daughter care for her. Dr. Reynolds struggles with his relationship with Dr. Malvo and Dr. Baptiste and opens up about it to his sister. A woman is treated for a liver malfunction and her magician brother accompanies her. She needs a transplant, but her brother cannot help her for a secret reason. Two boys are brought in with severe symptoms. It turns out that their school's nurse has mixed up their medications, so Dr. Goodwin investigates. Dr. Frome consults a woman whose cancer is in remission and has only now learned what her family actually thinks about her.
74	20	"Rise"	Don Scardino	Laura Valdivia	May 10, 2022	2.98
Dr. Fuentes assigns some doctors to new positions. Dr. Goodwin eventually gives up, admitting he cannot get Dr. Fuentes out of New Amsterdam. He discovers some janitors' problems with cheap rubber gloves and helps them out with steroid cream. Dr. Frome has a patient who does not leave his apartment. They meet in an online game, but the patient does not know he is playing with a shrink. Dr. Walsh is promoted to chair of the ED. At first, he is enjoying it and implements methods he thinks improve the efficiency of the emergency process. A woman pregnant with twins is treated by Dr. Wilder and Dr. Reynolds. The unborn children have lung cancer. Dr. Sharpe in London is struggling with the laws concerning prolonging the life of a terminally ill boy.
75	21	"Castles Made of Sand"	Darnell Martin	Josh Carlebach	May 17, 2022	2.92
Dr. Sharpe wants her wedding with Dr. Goodwin to happen in a beautiful English castle, so she visits one with her mother. Dr. Goodwin is surprised by the large number of elderly people coming into New Amsterdam because an elder care facility has shut down. All the departments take care of this influx of new patients, many of whom have a gonorrhea infection. Dr. Goodwin takes care of a former pianist. Dr. Reynolds orders many surgeries to be done simultaneously, surgeries for which the patients have waited a long time. This becomes a capacity problem. Dr. Frome helps a nurse whose job is his calling, but also a danger to his health. Eventually, Dr. Bloom lets all these patients put their questions about sex on pieces of paper and answers them.
76	22	"I'll Be Your Shelter"	Michael Slovis	David Schulner & Erika Green Swafford	May 24, 2022	3.45
Dr. Sharpe prepares to leave London in order to meet Dr. Goodwin for their marriage ceremony. Dr. Frome and his husband Martin are at odds about their relationship. A strong hurricane is about to hit New York City. The interim medical director Dr. Langford is not able to deal with the situation and eventually Dr. Frome takes charge. He brings the patients into the stairwell, where suddenly people cannot breathe anymore. The hurricane hits the city and New Amsterdam hard. Dr. Reynolds meets his father; they brace for the storm and need to save a woman after an accident. A man brings a wounded woman into the ED. He seems to be very possessive about her and the doctors in the ED wonder if she needs a different kind of help. Dr. Goodwin finds a coffee seller in the street being crushed by his trolley; he is in need of dialysis. When the storm is over, Dr. Goodwin is worried about Dr. Sharpe's flight. Their colleagues prepare a wedding ceremony on the roof of New Amsterdam hospital. However, Dr. Sharpe reveals on the phone she has never left London and breaks up with Dr. Goodwin.

=== Season 5 (2022–23) ===
No. overall	No. in season	Title	Directed by	Written by	Original release date	U.S. viewers (millions)
77	1	"TBD"	Ryan Eggold	David Schulner	September 20, 2022	3.22
Dr. Goodwin tries to come to terms with his breakup with Dr. Sharpe and his friends at New Amsterdam do their best to console him. He keeps remembering scenes from his time with Dr. Sharpe, wondering if he missed any hints. Dr. Bloom lets Dr. Shinwari stay at her apartment without her there, forcing Dr. Bloom to couch surf at her colleagues' places. Dr. Frome and Martin take turns looking after their children. Dr. Wilder treats a terminally ill boy who has a wish before he dies: he wants to star in a Bollywood musical! Dr. Bloom later treats a group of sex workers who have been attacked and injured. Karen Brantley delivers the great news to Dr. Goodwin that the hospital has received a huge donation from a company whose name does not exactly stand for what Dr. Goodwin considers to be the spirit of New Amsterdam.
78	2	"Hook, Line, and Sinker"	Olenka Denysenko	Aaron Ginsburg	September 27, 2022	2.66
Dr. Frome records a video for his dating app, but nobody contacts him. Horace Reynolds, father of Dr. Floyd Reynolds, wants to go fishing with his son. When they eventually do, they start fishing in a drinking water reservoir and get chased by a security guard. Dr. Bloom remarks that some patients are not able to pay for their medication and tells this to Dr. Goodwin. He then has a great cost-saving idea that he proposes to the board of directors. Dr. Wilder treats a famous baseball star who got his arm badly injured in an accident. A decision about an amputation has to be made but, when the patient refuses surgery, Dr. Wilder and Dr. Frome come into conflict.
79	3	"Big Day"	Nestor Carbonell	Laura Valdivia	October 4, 2022	2.81
Dr. Goodwin starts learning American Sign Language in order to better communicate with Dr. Wilder. A wedding party is admitted to the New Amsterdam emergency room after a suspected explosion and all the doctors get busy. One patient requires the donation of an extremely rare type of blood, but several attempts to obtain such a blood supply fail. Dr. Wilder, Dr. Goodwin, and Ben Meyer embark on a journey to find a donor. Dr. Bloom and Dr. Reynolds find a peculiar oblong object in the back of one of the party members. His wife suddenly coughs blood. Dr. Frome treats a young catatonic girl who has a secret.
80	4	"Heal Thyself"	Darnell Martin	David Foster	October 11, 2022	2.61
Dr. Goodwin forces the department heads to take care of their own health for one day. Dr. Reynolds gets a heart condition treated. When he enters surgery, he first tries to micromanage it himself. Dr. Wilder undergoes surgery for carpal tunnel syndrome in her wrists. Dr. Frome comes to terms with dating again and gets analyzed by a homosexual colleague. Dr. Bloom's weight is too low, so she can't get her Adderall back until she puts on some pounds. She gets, among other items, a big pizza delivered to her ED. Later, she notices she might be okay without her medication.
81	5	"Grabby Hands"	Lisa Robinson	Graham Norris	October 18, 2022	2.60
Dr. Bloom stays with her younger sister Vanessa. Luna Goodwin has a small cut on her finger and gets treated by Dr. Bloom as a large group of people with sodium nitrate poisoning are wheeled into the ED. They all come from the same house, so Dr. Reynolds investigates. Dr. Frome drives some young patients into the woods and wants them to concentrate on nature; he takes their smartphones away. Dr. Wilder treats a woman who suddenly speaks pig Latin. A nurse gets arrested because she accidentally administered a lethal dose of medication to a patient. Now, New Amsterdam's nurses are overly cautious in administering medications.
82	6	"Give Me a Sign"	Jean E. Lee	Gisselle Legere	October 25, 2022	2.86
Dr. Frome tries to discover who he wants to be and experiments with various hobbies. Nurse Casey is back in the ED. Dr. Goodwin and Dr. Wilder help an elderly lady and her grandchild after an accident at a dangerous road crossing. The boy is asked to make a tough decision about his grandmother's surgery. Dr. Goodwin wants to get the crossing fixed and contacts an energetic lawyer. Dr. Frome meets a little boy who cannot be calmed down and turns out to be deaf.
83	7	"Maybe Tomorrow"	Shiri Appleby	Shanthi Sekaran	November 1, 2022	2.80
The staff of New Amsterdam struggles with the effects of the US Supreme Court's overruling of Roe v Wade. Dr. Wilder treats a patient whose cervical cancer requires chemotherapy which would terminate her pregnancy, but the woman refuses treatment. Dr. Goodwin tries to find a solution for women wanting an abortion and turns to Todd Benson and a ship line for help. Dr. Frome gets between the sides of a protest in front of the hospital and hits a man, but cannot bring himself to apologize. Dr. Bloom and Dr. Reynolds lead a group of students interested in medicine through the hospital, being distracted by discussions of their past relationship.
84	8	"All the World's a Stage..."	Rachel Leiterman	Brandy E. Palmer	November 15, 2022	2.35
Dr. Goodwin confronts New Amsterdam's bequest department, which attends to elderly patients when their families are not, convincing the patients to pass their wealth to the hospital. Dr. Frome meets a psychic janitor who miraculously helps patients, bringing them together with deceased relatives. Dr. Bloom, Dr. Wilder, and Dr. Reynolds treat a group of beauty pageant participants with injuries from a collapsing stage. The mother of one of the candidates has been providing her daughter with marijuana, resulting in the girl having dangerous hallucinations.
85	9	"The Empty Spaces"	Nick Gomez	Allen L. Sowelle	November 22, 2022	3.18
Dr. Reynolds' father is living with him and they try to get along. After the death of their mother, Lauren and Vanessa Bloom struggle with adjusting their relationship with each other. Dr. Wilder and Dr. Goodwin develop their professional and private relationship further. Dr. Goodwin receives the patient satisfaction scores and discusses the results with the department heads. Dr. Frome cannot cope with high scores being seen as bad. Dr. Bloom treats siblings after a severe bicycle accident. Dr. Reynolds helps a young drug addict overcome fears about her pregnancy. Dr. Wilder meets one of her cancer patients who seems to miraculously be healed. Dr. Wilder and Dr. Goodwin have a clarifying talk about their relationship.
86	10	"Don't Do This for Me"	Andrew Voegeli	David Foster & Graham Norris	November 22, 2022	2.73
Dr. Reynolds wants to get together with travel nurse Gabrielle, but his father invites him to a fishing convention. Dr. Frome is back together with his husband Martin and their children are delighted. He later deals with a man who hallucinates gruesome things going on in New Amsterdam. Dr. Goodwin needs to fill in as head of the ICU and helps an attending doctor deal with a traumatic event in her past. Dr. Wilder gets a visit from her former mentor Dr. Clemons (guest star Oscar-winning actress Marlee Matlin) who needs her cancer treated. She plans to open a hospital by and for deaf people and she wants Dr. Wilder strongly involved. Dr. Bloom's sister is brought into the ED with an overdose of narcotics.
87	11	"Falling"	Peter Horton	Mona Mansour & Laura Valdivia	January 3, 2023	2.37
After Dr. Goodwin sees Dr. Sharpe on TV being back in New York, he is shaken and insecure about how to deal with both this situation and his relationship with Dr. Wilder. He takes Dr. Wilder, Dr. Bloom, and Dr. Frome on a hiking trip to a rocky forest. The trip starts out fun, but develops dramatically. At the hospital, Dr. Reynolds organizes the difficult brain surgery of the son of a friend from medical school. A search team struggles to find a missing radioactive substance in New Amsterdam and intrudes all departments. Eventually, Dr. Goodwin has to make a decision about the future of his private relationships.
88	12	"Right Place"	Don Scardino	Josh Carlebach	January 17, 2023	3.47
Dr. Wilder and Dr. Goodwin live their relationship right in New Amsterdam hospital. Dr. Frome wants to take care of a homeless woman. Dr. Bloom is looking for a new apartment and wants to visit an ideal candidate, but keeps being distracted by emergencies. Dr. Reynolds treats a patient who has received an illegal lung transplant. Dr. Goodwin is happy to present an effective medication against cancer, but Dr. Wilder has to notify him about a flaw in the trial procedure, one that Dr. Sharpe caused. Dr. Frome tries to revitalize his relationship with Martin.
89	13	"How Can I Help?"	Michael Slovis	Aaron Ginsburg & David Schulner	January 17, 2023	2.83
Dr. Goodwin tells the New Amsterdam staff that he will be leaving the hospital and going to the WHO in Geneva, Switzerland. A woman who fled from war-torn Ukraine with her son is brought into the ED with heavy illness symptoms and the doctors need to find out the cause. Dr. Goodwin organizes her complicated surgery with a huge team of doctors. Dr. Frome tries to make contact with the boy, who does not speak. Dr. Goodwin eventually hands over the key to his office and the post of medical director to Dr. Wilder. He then makes a farewell tour through the hospital with Luna on his arm. Through periodic flashforwards, it is revealed that Luna returns to New Amsterdam many years later as the hospital's new medical director. The episode ends with her repeating the same words her father spoke during his first meeting with the hospital: "How can I help?"

== Ratings ==
=== Season 1 ===
Viewership and ratings per episode of List of New Amsterdam episodes
No.	Title	Air date	Rating/share (18–49)	Viewers (millions)	DVR (18–49)	DVR viewers (millions)	Total (18–49)	Total viewers (millions)
1	"Pilot"	September 25, 2018	1.8/9	8.39	1.3	5.70	3.1	14.10
2	"Rituals"	October 2, 2018	1.5/7	7.44	1.4	5.42	2.9	12.86
3	"Every Last Minute"	October 9, 2018	1.4/6	7.04	1.4	5.43	2.8	12.47
4	"Boundaries"	October 16, 2018	1.2/5	6.27	1.3	5.34	2.5	11.61
5	"Cavitation"	October 23, 2018	1.4/6	6.37	1.2	5.14	2.6	11.51
6	"Anthropocene"	October 30, 2018	1.3/6	6.66	1.2	5.10	2.5	11.76
7	"Domino Effect"	November 13, 2018	1.1/5	6.02	1.3	5.27	2.4	11.29
8	"Three Dots"	November 20, 2018	1.1/5	5.82	1.3	5.40	2.4	11.22
9	"As Long As It Takes"	November 27, 2018	1.1/5	6.26	1.2	5.13	2.3	11.39
10	"Six or Seven Minutes"	January 8, 2019	1.0/4	5.35	1.2	5.17	2.2	10.52
11	"A Seat at the Table"	January 15, 2019	1.0/5	5.61	1.3	5.46	2.3	11.07
12	"Anima Sola"	January 22, 2019	1.0/5	5.76	1.2	5.40	2.2	11.17
13	"The Blues"	February 12, 2019	1.0/4	5.69	1.2	5.41	2.2	11.10
14	"The Foresaken"	February 19, 2019	1.0/5	5.58	1.2	5.30	2.2	10.88
15	"Croaklahoma"	March 5, 2019	1.0/5	5.82	1.2	5.44	2.2	11.26
16	"King of Swords"	March 12, 2019	1.0/5	5.98	1.2	5.22	2.2	11.20
17	"Sanctuary"	April 9, 2019	0.7/3	4.61	1.0	4.77	1.7	9.38
18	"Five Miles West"	April 16, 2019	0.6/3	4.47	1.0	4.92	1.6	9.39
19	"Happy Place"	April 23, 2019	0.8/4	5.18	0.9	4.58	1.7	9.76
20	"Preventable"	April 30, 2019	0.8/4	5.24	0.9	4.53	1.7	9.77
21	"This is Not the End"	May 7, 2019	0.8/4	5.19	0.8	4.21	1.6	9.40
22	"Luna"	May 14, 2019	0.9/4	5.54	1.0	4.57	1.9	10.11

=== Season 2 ===
Viewership and ratings per episode of List of New Amsterdam episodes
No.	Title	Air date	Rating/share (18–49)	Viewers (millions)	DVR (18–49)	DVR viewers (millions)	Total (18–49)	Total viewers (millions)
1	"Your Turn"	September 24, 2019	1.0/5	5.91	1.2	5.80	2.2	11.71
2	"The Big Picture"	October 1, 2019	0.8/4	5.29	1.0	4.73	1.8	10.03
3	"Replacement"	October 8, 2019	0.8/4	5.27	1.0	4.59	1.8	9.87
4	"The Denominator"	October 15, 2019	0.8/4	4.95	0.9	4.43	1.7	9.39
5	"The Karman Line"	October 22, 2019	0.9/4	5.14	0.9	4.42	1.8	9.56
6	"Righteous Right Hand"	October 29, 2019	0.8/4	5.16	0.8	4.25	1.6	9.42
7	"Good Soldiers"	November 5, 2019	0.7/4	4.96	0.9	4.70	1.6	9.66
8	"What the Heart Wants"	November 12, 2019	0.7/4	5.06	0.9	4.42	1.6	9.48
9	"The Island"	November 19, 2019	0.8/4	5.46	0.9	4.26	1.7	9.73
10	"Code Silver"	January 14, 2020	0.8/5	4.98	0.9	4.78	1.7	9.76
11	"Hiding Behind My Smile"	January 21, 2020	0.7/4	4.71	0.9	4.73	1.6	9.44
12	"14 Years, 2 Months, 8 Days"	January 28, 2020	0.7/4	4.87	0.9	4.53	1.6	9.40
13	"In the Graveyard"	February 11, 2020	0.6	4.47	0.9	4.64	1.5	9.12
14	"Sabbath"	February 18, 2020	0.6	4.71	1.0	4.76	1.6	9.47
15	"Double Blind"	February 25, 2020	0.7	5.16	0.9	4.55	1.6	9.71
16	"Perspectives"	March 10, 2020	0.7	4.44	0.8	4.60	1.5	9.04
17	"Liftoff"	March 17, 2020	0.8	5.20	0.9	4.72	1.7	9.92
18	"Matter of Seconds"	April 14, 2020	0.9	6.03	0.8	3.98	1.7	10.01

=== Season 3 ===
Viewership and ratings per episode of List of New Amsterdam episodes
No.	Title	Air date	Rating (18–49)	Viewers (millions)	DVR (18–49)	DVR viewers (millions)	Total (18–49)	Total viewers (millions)
1	"The New Normal"	March 2, 2021	0.6	4.19	0.6	4.23	1.2	8.43
2	"Essential Workers"	March 9, 2021	0.6	4.23	0.6	3.73	1.2	7.96
3	"Safe Enough"	March 16, 2021	0.4	3.64	—N/a	—N/a	—N/a	—N/a
4	"This is All I Need"	March 23, 2021	0.5	3.96	—N/a	—N/a	—N/a	—N/a
5	"Blood, Sweat & Tears"	March 30, 2021	0.4	3.44	—N/a	—N/a	—N/a	—N/a
6	"Why Not Yesterday"	April 6, 2021	0.4	3.60	0.5	3.29	0.9	6.89
7	"The Legend of Howie Cournemeyer"	April 13, 2021	0.4	3.37	0.5	3.24	0.9	6.61
8	"Catch"	April 20, 2021	0.5	3.73	0.5	3.25	0.9	6.98
9	"Disconnected"	April 27, 2021	0.4	3.10	0.5	3.33	0.9	6.43
10	"Radical"	May 4, 2021	0.4	3.02	0.4	2.89	0.8	5.91
11	"Pressure Drop"	May 11, 2021	0.4	3.27	0.4	2.79	0.8	6.06
12	"Things Fall Apart"	May 18, 2021	0.4	3.09	0.4	3.03	0.8	6.11
13	"Fight Time"	June 1, 2021	0.5	3.95	0.4	3.09	0.9	7.04
14	"Death Begins in Radiology"	June 8, 2021	0.5	4.10	0.4	2.98	0.9	7.08

=== Season 4 ===
Viewership and ratings per episode of List of New Amsterdam episodes
No.	Title	Air date	Rating (18–49)	Viewers (millions)	DVR (18–49)	DVR viewers (millions)	Total (18–49)	Total viewers (millions)
1	"More Joy"	September 21, 2021	0.5	3.72	—N/a	—N/a	—N/a	—N/a
2	"We're in This Together"	September 28, 2021	0.4	3.55	—N/a	—N/a	—N/a	—N/a
3	"Same as It Ever Was"	October 5, 2021	0.3	2.86	—N/a	—N/a	—N/a	—N/a
4	"Seed Money"	October 12, 2021	0.4	3.30	0.3	2.62	0.7	5.92
5	"This Be the Verse"	October 19, 2021	0.3	3.42	0.4	2.58	0.7	6.00
6	"Laughter and Hope and a Sock in the Eye"	October 26, 2021	0.4	3.53	—N/a	—N/a	—N/a	—N/a
7	"Harmony"	November 2, 2021	0.3	2.81	—N/a	—N/a	—N/a	—N/a
8	"Paid in Full"	November 9, 2021	0.4	3.07	—N/a	—N/a	—N/a	—N/a
9	"In a Strange Land"	November 16, 2021	0.4	3.23	0.4	2.94	0.7	6.16
10	"Death is the Rule. Life is the Exception."	November 23, 2021	0.4	3.33	0.3	2.73	0.7	6.07
11	"Talkin' Bout A Revolution"	January 4, 2022	0.4	3.27	—N/a	—N/a	—N/a	—N/a
12	"The Crossover"	January 11, 2022	0.5	3.13	—N/a	—N/a	—N/a	—N/a
13	"Family"	January 18, 2022	0.4	3.45	—N/a	—N/a	—N/a	—N/a
14	"...Unto the Breach"	January 25, 2022	0.4	3.31	—N/a	—N/a	—N/a	—N/a
15	"Two Doors"	February 22, 2022	0.3	2.83	—N/a	—N/a	—N/a	—N/a
16	"All Night Long"	April 19, 2022	0.4	3.04	—N/a	—N/a	—N/a	—N/a
17	"Unfinished Business"	April 26, 2022	0.4	3.29	—N/a	—N/a	—N/a	—N/a
18	"No Ifs, Ands or Buts"	May 3, 2022	0.4	3.41	—N/a	—N/a	—N/a	—N/a
19	"Truth Be Told"	May 9, 2022	0.3	2.43	—N/a	—N/a	—N/a	—N/a
20	"Rise"	May 10, 2022	0.4	2.98	—N/a	—N/a	—N/a	—N/a
21	"Castles Made of Sand"	May 17, 2022	0.4	2.92	—N/a	—N/a	—N/a	—N/a
22	"I'll Be Your Shelter"	May 24, 2022	0.5	3.45	—N/a	—N/a	—N/a	—N/a

=== Season 5 ===
Viewership and ratings per episode of List of New Amsterdam episodes
No.	Title	Air date	Rating (18–49)	Viewers (millions)	DVR (18–49)	DVR viewers (millions)	Total (18–49)	Total viewers (millions)
1	"TBD"	September 20, 2022	0.4	3.22	0.3	2.59	0.7	5.81
2	"Hook, Line, and Sinker"	September 27, 2022	0.3	2.66	0.3	2.34	0.6	5.00
3	"Big Day"	October 4, 2022	0.3	2.81	0.3	2.53	0.6	5.34
4	"Heal Thyself"	October 11, 2022	0.2	2.61	0.3	2.36	0.5	4.97
5	"Grabby Hands"	October 18, 2022	0.3	2.60	0.2	2.37	0.5	4.97
6	"Give Me a Sign"	October 25, 2022	0.3	2.86	0.3	2.32	0.5	5.18
7	"Maybe Tomorrow"	November 1, 2022	0.3	2.80	0.3	2.20	0.5	5.00
8	"All the World's a Stage..."	November 15, 2022	0.3	2.35	0.3	2.50	0.5	4.85
9	"The Empty Spaces"	November 22, 2022	0.4	3.18	—N/a	—N/a	—N/a	—N/a
10	"Don't Do This for Me"	November 22, 2022	0.3	2.73	—N/a	—N/a	—N/a	—N/a
11	"Falling"	January 3, 2023	0.3	2.37	0.3	2.51	0.6	4.88
12	"Right Place"	January 17, 2023	0.4	3.47	0.3	2.19	0.7	5.66
13	"How Can I Help?"	January 17, 2023	0.3	2.83	0.3	2.43	0.6	5.26

New Amsterdam : U.S. viewers per episode (millions)

Season	Episode number																					
Season	1	2	3	4	5	6	7	8	9	10	11	12	13	14	15	16	17	18	19	20	21	22
1	8.39	7.44	7.04	6.27	6.37	6.66	6.02	5.82	6.26	5.35	5.61	5.76	5.69	5.58	5.82	5.98	4.61	4.47	5.18	5.24	5.19	5.54
2	5.91	5.29	5.27	4.95	5.13	5.16	4.96	5.06	5.46	4.98	4.71	4.87	4.47	4.71	5.16	4.44	5.20	6.03	–			
3	4.19	4.23	3.64	3.96	3.44	3.60	3.37	3.73	3.10	3.02	3.27	3.09	3.95	4.10	–							
4	3.72	3.55	2.86	3.30	3.42	3.53	2.81	3.07	3.23	3.33	3.27	3.13	3.45	3.31	2.83	3.04	3.29	3.41	2.43	2.98	2.92	3.45
5	3.22	2.66	2.81	2.61	2.60	2.86	2.80	2.35	3.18	2.73	2.37	3.47	2.83	–								

Audience measurement performed by Nielsen Media Research
