= Alexander Hodge =

Australian actor

- Born: Sydney, New South Wales, Australia
- Occupation: Actor
- Known for: Insecure

Alexander Hodge is an Australian actor. He is best known for portraying Andrew on the HBO series Insecure. Hodge has acted on Black Lightning, Resort to Love, and Joy Ride.

== Early life and education ==
Hodge was born and raised in Sydney, Australia. His father is Irish and was raised in Australia; his mother is Chinese and was raised in Singapore. He described his environment as predominantly white. Hodge stated that he struggled with shame about his Chinese ancestry during childhood, which he attributed to internalized ideas about Asian men that he saw in mainstream media. He began acting in school at age 13 after being kicked out of a woodworking class. Hodge played rugby competitively and began to pursue it as a career. He severely injured his knee during a game when he was 21 and used a wheelchair during rehabilitation for the injury. Shortly after, Hodge moved to New York to attend acting school at the American Academy of Dramatic Arts, and relocated to Los Angeles after graduation in 2016.

== Career ==
Hodge auditioned for the role of Andrew on season 3 of Insecure, a love interest to Molly. He was cast in the role, for which he gained wider prominence. The character was nicknamed "Asian Bae" by the show's viewers on social media. He was promoted to a member of the regular cast on season 4 of the show. Hodge has spoken about the significance of an Asian character who is shown as "confident" and "outspoken" because it challenges stereotypes about Asian men.

Hodge has acted in Modern Family, High Maintenance, Law & Order, and Tommy.

In 2021, Hodge guest starred as Philky on The CW series Black Lightning. He reprised the role in the backdoor spin-off series Painkiller, which the network did not pick up. That year he played a supporting role in the Netflix movie, Resort to Love.

In 2022 it was announced that Hodge was cast in a supporting role in the film Which Brings Me To You. He is a supporting character in the Adele Lim film Joy Ride.

Hodge is a main cast member in the 2025 NBC series Grosse Pointe Garden Society.

== Personal life ==
Hodge resides in Los Angeles.

== Filmography ==
=== Television ===
Year	Title	Role	Notes
2017	Law & Order: Special Victims Unit	Trent Dillion	
2017	Bull	DJ Oculus	
2017	Woe Is She	Steven	
2018	High Maintenance	"Friendly Guy"	
2018	Modern Family	"Attendant"	
2018–2020	Insecure	Andrew Tan	Recurring season 3; main cast season 4
2019	#LifeOnAir	Evan	
2020	Tommy	Eric Decker	Recurring role
2021	Black Lightning	Philky	Recurring role
2023	Wellmania	Isaac Huang	
2025	Grosse Pointe Garden Society	Doug	Main cast

=== Film ===
Year	Title	Role	Notes
2019	Abe	Chef Roy Wang	
2020	Milkwater	Kaz	
2021	Resort to Love	Christian	
2023	Joy Ride	Todd	
2024	Which Brings Me to You	Elton	
