= Which Brings Me to You =

2024 film by Peter Hutchings

- Theatrical release poster
- Directed by: Peter Hutchings
- Screenplay by: Keith Bunin
- Based on: Which Brings Me to You by: Julianna Baggott; Steve Almond
- Produced by: Claude Dal Farra; Brian Keady
- Starring: Lucy Hale; Nat Wolff; Britne Oldford; Genevieve Angelson; Alexander Hodge; John Gallagher Jr.
- Cinematography: Karina Silva
- Edited by: Jason Nicholson
- Music by: Spencer Hutchings
- Production companies: BCDF Pictures; Anonymous Content; Mister Smith Entertainment; Three Point Capital
- Distributed by: Decal
- Release date: January 19, 2024
- Running time: 98 minutes
- Country: United States
- Language: English

Which Brings Me to You is a 2024 American romantic comedy film directed by Peter Hutchings and starring Lucy Hale and Nat Wolff. It is an adaptation by Keith Bunin of Steve Almond and Julianna Baggott's novel of the same name.

Which Brings Me to You was released in theaters on January 19, 2024.

== Plot ==
Photographer Will and journalist Jane meet at a wedding in The Hamptons when his extreme tardiness catches her attention. He approaches her at the reception, they chat briefly on the nearby beach, and then Jane proposes they have sex in a closet.

Just as they are about to have sex, Will decides he wants to talk first. Jane storms out and he follows, insisting she not drive drunk. Then Will tells her about his most embarrassing sexual encounter and about his first love, who he lost when he paid her a surprise visit and found her cheating on him.

In a diner, Jane then tells her first heartbreak story. Bad boy Michael had attracted her when she was a Catholic school student, introducing her to graffiti and petty theft. One day when he was late picking her up, she went to his home and discovered his father had died. When Jane offered emotional support, Michael broke ties.

Will next talks about Eve, whom he met as a senior when she visited his college campus. She convinced him to skip class, they had sex, then she lured him to her NYC apartment. Soon he was skipping classes and spending most of his time with Eve. One day, when Will warned he would not be able to visit for a month due to exams, she suggests he not bother. Eve declared that she was in love with him. He then did an Irish exit, something she had taught him.

Jane, in turn, tells Will about Elton, a man who charmingly bought her a drink in a bar while she was underage. He had displayed a lot of eccentricities but she had not realized he was mentally ill until one evening when he shouted his feelings for her from the edge of a rooftop. Jane visited Elton in the institution where he was placed, but ended the relationship because of his instability.

Both reveal that their parents are split. Jane admits she recently broke off an engagement with a lawyer and asks Will if he currently has any significant relationships. He assures her that although he has had flings in the past, he has been single for a year.

Jane's most heartbreaking relationship story happened when, as a grad student, she got involved with a professor who was agoraphobic and a recovering alcoholic. She soon moved in with him and accepted his non-existent social life. After months together, they tried to attend a party but he backed out at the last moment; upon returning home later, she found him drunk on the porch.

In the morning, desperate to not lose her, he proposed, but she decided to leave him. When Will asks whether she has seen the professor since, she is shown visiting his grave in a flashback and she admits she feels responsible for his death.

Will starts to tell Jane about the singer Audrey but does not finish the story as they passionately make love in his motel room. When they finish, he goes to the bathroom and Jane sees a card in his bag on which he has written "I love you, I love you, I love you." Will explains that he and Audrey had gotten serious and moved in together, but he soon broke up with her and at that time Audrey revealed she was pregnant. The card is for their almost five-year-old daughter, Juliet.

Jane, upset that Will did not tell her about this "significant relationship", abruptly gets dressed to leave. Will begs her to stay but she insists he is incapable of commitment. While a distraught Will drives to a beach, phones Juliet, and then jumps into the ocean, Jane walks along the highway and calls a Lyft. Emotionally torn, she asks the driver to pull over.

Just as Jane is about to go back, Will drives by, so they follow him. They end up at a beach where they had talked earlier and he excitedly tells her all about Juliet, showing he adores her. They both admit that as they've talked, they've become increasingly interested in each other and motivated to share more. They promise to take a leap of faith to be together, and seal it with a kiss.

== Cast ==
- Lucy Hale as Jane
- Nat Wolff as Will
- John Gallagher Jr. as Wallace
- Genevieve Angelson as Eve
- Alexander Hodge as Elton
- Britne Oldford as Audrey
- Erin Ruth Walker as Jodi
- Chase Liefeld as Michael
- Ward Horton as Mark
- Reilly Walters as Todd
- Michael Mulheren as Eddie
- Marceline Hugot as Olivia
- Shannon O'Neill as a Lyft driver

== Production ==
An adaptation of Steve Almond and Julianna Baggott's novel Which Brings Me to You by Keith Bunin was announced in May 2022 from director Peter Hutchings and BCDF Pictures. The film is produced by Claude Dal Farra and Brian Keady, and was executive produced by Lucy Hale and Nat Wolff along with Decal Releasing’s Sara Castillo and Ayo Kepher-Maat. Decal Releasing secured distribution rights in December 2023.

In September 2022, Nat Wolff joined Lucy Hale in the cast. That month John Gallagher Jr., Britne Oldford, Genevieve Angelson, Alexander Hodge, and Chase Liefeld joined the cast. Filming took place in New Jersey in September 2023.

== Release ==
Which Brings Me to You was released in theatres in the United States on January 19, 2024.

== Reception ==
On the review aggregator website Rotten Tomatoes, 70% of 30 critics' reviews are positive, with an average rating of 6.1/10.

Lisa Kennedy in The New York Times described the film as "cleverly structured". Arezou Amin for Collider praised the lead pair's chemistry and described the premise as "cute and clever" but said the film gets "bogged down". Elizabeth Bray in The Guardian praised the characterisation of the lead characters, who are "recognisably rounded, flawed and mostly charming".
