= Jennifer Betit Yen =

American lawyer

- Born: New York City, New York
- Occupations: Actor, Lawyer, Producer, and Writer

Jennifer Betit Yen (born in New York City, New York) is an actor, lawyer, producer, and writer.

As an actor, Betit Yen has performed for East West Players and The Manhattan Theatre Source. She was cast in New Amsterdam, Royal Pains, Search Party, and America's Most Wanted, among others. She also completed voiceover work for Reading Rainbow and Beacon Street Girls.

Since 2012, she has been president of The Film Lab, a non-profit dedicated to the promotion of diversity in media and launched its first production arm, AAFL TV. Her work at The Film Lab has been covered by HuffPost, Backstage (magazine), and other media outlets.

Her screenplay, The Opposite of a Fairy Tale, received grant funding from the Ms. Foundation for Women.

Betit Yen writes the blog Ethical is Beautiful. Be Beautiful.

== Film ==
Betit Yen wrote and starred in the 2009 Accolade Award-winning web series La La Land in 2009. She also starred in the web series My Not So Subonscious.

Betit Yen’s feature film debut, Interrogation, was an official selection of the Boston International Film Festival.

== Television ==
She created the television series Mirror Mirror, a sitcom about corporate sexual harassment.

Betit Yen launched the television series Film Lab Presents "to re-shape perceptions of people of color in the mainstream media in a genuine, positive and meaningful manner.” The municipal network NYC Media broadcast the series.

== Theater ==
Betit Yen appeared in the Manhattan Theatre Source’s Paper Dragon in the role of Bot. She also created the IWATTAU ("Immigrants: We Are Them. They Are Us") project, utilizing interactive live theatre and story telling to address issues of racism and xenophobia.
