= Resort to Love =

2021 film by Steven Tsuchida

- Release poster
- Directed by: Steven Tsuchida
- Screenplay by: Tabi McCartney; Dana Schmalenberg
- Story by: Tabi McCartney
- Produced by: Alicia Keys; Maggie Malina; Jeremy Kipp Walker
- Starring: Christina Milian; Jay Pharoah; Sinqua Walls
- Cinematography: Greg Gardiner
- Edited by: Emma E. Hickox
- Music by: Laura Karpman
- Production companies: AK Worldwide; The Malina Yarn Company; Story Ink
- Distributed by: Netflix
- Release date: July 29, 2021
- Running time: 101 minutes
- Country: United States
- Language: English

Resort to Love is a 2021 American romantic comedy film directed by Steven Tsuchida, from a screenplay by Tabi McCartney and Dana Schmalenberg.

The plot follows Erica (Christina Milian), an aspiring pop star in the midst of a career standstill, who ends up landing a gig as the entertainment lead at a luxurious island resort where, unbeknownst to her, her ex-fiancé is having his wedding.

The film was released on Netflix on July 29, 2021.

== Plot ==
Aspiring pop star Erica Wilson's dreams are crushed when her musical partner and producer bails on his album release party, which would have started her career. Down the street, the devastated Erica is crying in disarray with her best friend, Amber, when a couple of buskers begins to play "No One" by Alicia Keys. This causes Erica to remember when Jason, her ex-fiancé of four years, pulled the rug out from under her, breaking up with her right before their wedding. The song makes Erica all the more hysterical as it was supposed to play during the first dance at her wedding.

Tired of seeing her friend let go of her romantic and professional life Amber, a social media influencer, books Erica a gig working as an entertainer at an upscale resort in Mauritius. It takes a while for Erica to accept Amber's offering, but after a bit of convincing, she takes the job.

There, Erica is greeted by the resort's jack-of-all-trades, Barrington, who is also in her band. She is hopeful the island will be paradise and a nice way to leave all her troubles behind. However she soon has a change of heart after learning that she has been hired as a wedding singer.

Erica's first performance is subpar and she doubts her ability to keep her job. Advised by Barrington to sing something that makes her happy, Erica sings Gloria Gaynor's "I Will Survive". She then embraces her surroundings and makes the best of her time on the island.

Erica runs into Jason and learns that he is there for his wedding weekend. Shocked at knowing she is going to have to sing at their wedding, she tries to avoid running into him until then. Later, Erica meets Caleb, a retired Navy SEAL who saves her from drowning. She also learns that he is Jason's brother (whom she had not met previously), there for the wedding.

Erica meets the bride-to-be, Beverly, and the rest of the wedding party. Although Erica and Jason try to avoid each other as much as possible at the resort, Erica winds up spending a good chunk of time with them. As Beverly thinks Erica is just an old friend, unaware that she is Jason's ex, she invites her to do activities with them. Erica spends a lot of her time with Caleb, with them getting to know each other and connecting romantically.

The morning of Jason and Beverly's wedding, Beverly and Jason's mother see Jason and Erica on the beach together. Naomi reveals that Erica and Jason were engaged. This causes Beverly to run away from the wedding in Barrington's van. However, this is soon resolved after Erica explains herself in Beverly's high-speed getaway van. After making up, Beverly and Jason get married and Erica sings "No One" at the reception. At the end of the song, Erica acknowledges her new love Caleb by planting a kiss on him.

== Cast ==
- Christina Milian as Erica Wilson
- Jay Pharoah as Jason King
- Sinqua Walls as Caleb King
- Tymberlee Hill as Amber
- Christiani Pitts as Beverly Strattford
- Karen Obilom as Janelle Strattford
- Alexander Hodge as Christian
- Kayne Lee Harrison as Cre
- Ruth Nadler-Nir as Teen girl
- Christophe St-Lambert as Travis
- Jeremy Boado as Instagrammer
- Jeryl Prescott Sales as Naomi King
- Pope Jerrod as Francis King
- TJ Power as Barrington

== Production ==
The film was directed by Steven K. Tsuchida, who has directed other popular works like Cobra Kai, On My Block, Grown-ish, Haters Back Off, and Crazy Ex-Girlfriend. It was produced by Maggie Malina, Jeremy Kipp Walker, and Alicia Keys. Filming took place at the Constance Prince Maurice resort on the island of Mauritius in late 2020.

== Reception ==
On review aggregator Rotten Tomatoes, 65% of 17 reviews are positive. On Metacritic it has a weighted average score of 46 out of 100, based on reviews from 5 critics, indicating "mixed or average reviews".

Lisa Kennedy of Variety wrote: "To say that Resort to Love is slight would be akin to snatching a romance novel out of your closest friend's hands while she sits reading and sipping a margarita on a beach. Why would you do that? It's summer. Leave the girl her pleasures."
