= Grosse Pointe Garden Society =

American drama television series

- Genre: Drama
- Created by: Jenna Bans & Bill Krebs
- Starring: Melissa Fumero; Aja Naomi King; Ben Rappaport; AnnaSophia Robb; Matthew Davis; Alexander Hodge; Nancy Travis; Felix Wolfe
- Music by: Sofia Hultquist; Ian Hultquist
- Country of origin: United States
- Original language: English
- No. of seasons: 1
- No. of episodes: 13

Production
- Executive producers: Maggie Kiley; Casey Kyber; Bill Krebs; Jenna Bans
- Producers: Kris Baugom; Michele Greco; Louis Shaw Milito
- Cinematography: Brian Burgoyne; Mike Karasick
- Editors: Tony Orcena; Chris Guiral; Todd Gerlinger
- Production companies: Minnesota Logging Company; Dark Chocolate Bunny Inc.; Universal Television

Original release
- Network: NBC
- Release: February 23 – May 16, 2025

Grosse Pointe Garden Society is an American drama television series written and created by Jenna Bans and Bill Krebs. It premiered on NBC on February 23, 2025. In June 2025, the series was canceled after one season.

== Premise ==
Four members of a suburban gardening club in Grosse Pointe, Michigan, near Detroit, share a murderous secret.

== Cast and characters ==
=== Main ===
- Melissa Fumero as Birdie, the newest member of the garden society
- Aja Naomi King as Catherine, a married real-estate agent
- Ben Rappaport as Brett, a divorced father who gave up his career dreams for his wife's legal career and now works as a manager of the Gardening club
- AnnaSophia Robb as Alice, a teacher at Grosse Pointe North High School married to Doug
- Matthew Davis as Joel, a police officer and the adoptive father of Birdie's son
- Alexander Hodge as Doug, Alice's husband
- Nancy Travis as Patty, Doug's mother
- Felix Wolfe as Ford, Birdie's biological son

=== Recurring ===
- Daniella Alonso as Misty, the adoptive mother of Ford
- Jennifer Irwin as Marilyn, the president of the garden society and wife of the mayor
- Saamer Usmani as Gary, a realtor who is having an affair with Catherine
- Ron Yuan as Keith, Doug's dad and Patty's husband
- Nora Zehetner as Melissa, Brett's ex-wife
- Jocko Sims as Tucker, Catherine's husband
- Heiress Harris as Addie, Tucker's daughter
- Josh Ventura as Connor, Melissa's new husband
- Frederick Stuart as Charlie, Birdie's wealthy ex-husband who she still has a friendship with

=== Guest ===
- Ginger Gonzaga as Cricket, Brett's new girlfriend
- Artemis Pebdani as Olga, Birdie's housekeeper who looks out for Birdie

== Episodes ==
| No. | Title | Directed by | Written by | Original release date | U.S. viewers (millions) |
|---|---|---|---|---|---|
| 1 | "Pilot" | Maggie Kiley | Jenna Bans & Bill Krebs | February 23, 2025 | 1.79 |
In Grosse Pointe, Alice, Brett, Catherine, and Birdie work at the Grosse Pointe Garden Club. Alice, a high-school teacher, feels dissatisfied with her career, especially since her dog Molly has gone missing. Brett, the garden club's manager, is a divorced father striving to maintain a relationship with his children, due to butting heads with his wife's new husband. Catherine is a real estate agent trapped in a loveless marriage; seeking affection elsewhere, she becomes involved with her coworker Gary. Birdie is a socialite doing community service in Grosse Pointe. To improve her image, she creates a college scholarship for a kid in need. Unbeknownst to him, she chooses the son she gave up for adoption. Catherine later discovers Gary has been simultaneously having sex with multiple women, including Birdie. Together, Catherine and Birdie work together to reveal his infidelity. Six months later, the core group of four have become entangled in a murder, and are working together to cover up the crime. Throughout the episode, they bury the body at the Garden Club, burn the victim's car, dispose of the victim's phone, and visit a diner to create an alibi. They then discover that, due to the success of the garden party, the garden is set to be torn up and replaced by a koi pond.
| 2 | "Pests" | Phil Traill | Jenna Bans & Bill Krebs | March 2, 2025 | 1.02 |
| 3 | "Companion Planting" | Phil Traill | Jenna Bans & Bill Krebs | March 9, 2025 | 1.06 |
| 4 | "Force of Nature" | Michael Weaver | Jenna Bans & Bill Krebs | March 16, 2025 | 1.03 |
| 5 | "Pollination" | Erin Feeley | Bridget Bedard | March 23, 2025 | 0.85 |
| 6 | "Plant Parenthood" | Alexandra Cunningham | Alexandra Cunningham | March 30, 2025 | 1.00 |
| 7 | "Germination" | Millicent Shelton | Nicki Renna | April 4, 2025 | 1.21 |
| 8 | "The Frost" | Sara Zandieh | Justin W. Lo | April 11, 2025 | 1.34 |
| 9 | "The Cup" | Pete Chatmon | Brook Sitgraves Turner | April 18, 2025 | 1.28 |
| 10 | "Seasons" | Michael Weaver | Samantha Taylor Pickett & Steve Rubinshteyn | April 25, 2025 | 1.24 |
| 11 | "Monaco Under the Stars" | Maggie Kiley | Kris Baucom | May 2, 2025 | 1.38 |
| 12 | "The Fallow Period" | Eric Galileo Tignini | Kaylon Kennedy & Jason Sheradsky | May 9, 2025 | 1.40 |
| 13 | "Bad Seeds" | Maggie Kiley | Jenna Bans & Bill Krebs | May 16, 2025 | 1.27 |

== Production ==
NBC began developing Grosse Pointe Garden Society in 2022, and opened a writers' room for the show in 2023. The project received a series order from the network in July 2024. The series was created by Jenna Bans and Bill Krebs—who, with Casey Kyber, act as showrunners and executive producers—and is produced by Universal Television. The pilot was directed by executive producer Maggie Kiley.

The main cast includes Melissa Fumero, Aja Naomi King, Ben Rappaport, AnnaSophia Robb, Alexander Hodge, Nancy Travis, Matthew Davis, and Felix Wolfe. In January 2025, Jocko Sims, Saamer Usmani, Josh Ventura, and Nora Zehetner were cast in recurring roles. On June 27, 2025, the series was canceled after one season.

== Broadcast ==
The series premiered on NBC on February 23, 2025. In Canada, the series airs on Citytv, and streams the next day on Citytv+.

== Reception ==
=== Critical response ===
The review aggregator website Rotten Tomatoes reported a 71% approval rating with an average rating of 6.6/10, based on 24 critic reviews. The website's critics consensus reads, "Naughty and not so nice with its salacious tour through the suburbs, Grosse Pointe Garden Society's twists aren't the sharpest shears in the shed but a game cast keeps the series watchable." Metacritic, which uses a weighted average, assigned a score of 58 out of 100 based on 12 critics, indicating "mixed or average" reviews.

=== Ratings ===
Viewership and ratings per episode of Grosse Pointe Garden Society
| No. | Title | Air date | Rating/share (18–49) | Viewers (millions) | DVR (18–49) | DVR viewers (millions) | Total (18–49) | Total viewers (millions) | Ref. |
|---|---|---|---|---|---|---|---|---|---|
| 1 | "Pilot" | February 23, 2025 | 0.2/3 | 1.79 | 0.1 | 1.01 | 0.3 | 2.80 | |
| 2 | "Pests" | March 2, 2025 | 0.1/1 | 1.02 | 0.1 | 0.83 | 0.2 | 1.86 | |
| 3 | "Companion Planting" | March 9, 2025 | 0.1/1 | 1.06 | 0.1 | 0.70 | 0.2 | 1.77 | |
| 4 | "Force of Nature" | March 16, 2025 | 0.1/2 | 1.03 | 0.1 | 0.71 | 0.2 | 1.74 | |
| 5 | "Pollination" | March 23, 2025 | 0.1/1 | 0.85 | 0.1 | 0.74 | 0.2 | 1.60 | |
| 6 | "Plant Parenthood" | March 30, 2025 | 0.1/2 | 1.00 | 0.1 | 0.71 | 0.2 | 1.71 | |
| 7 | "Germination" | April 4, 2025 | 0.1/2 | 1.21 | —N/a | —N/a | —N/a | —N/a | |
| 8 | "The Frost" | April 11, 2025 | 0.1/2 | 1.34 | —N/a | —N/a | —N/a | —N/a | |
| 9 | "The Cup" | April 18, 2025 | 0.1/2 | 1.28 | —N/a | —N/a | —N/a | —N/a | |
| 10 | "Seasons" | April 25, 2025 | 0.1/1 | 1.24 | —N/a | —N/a | —N/a | —N/a | |
| 11 | "Monaco Under the Stars" | May 2, 2025 | 0.1/2 | 1.38 | —N/a | —N/a | —N/a | —N/a | |
| 12 | "The Fallow Period" | May 9, 2025 | 0.1/2 | 1.40 | —N/a | —N/a | —N/a | —N/a | |
| 13 | "Bad Seeds" | May 16, 2025 | 0.2/2 | 1.27 | —N/a | —N/a | —N/a | —N/a | |
