= New Amsterdam (2018 TV series) =

American medical drama television series

- Genre: Medical drama
- Created by: David Schulner
- Based on: Twelve Patients: Life and Death at Bellevue Hospital by Eric Manheimer
- Starring: Ryan Eggold; Janet Montgomery; Freema Agyeman; Jocko Sims; Tyler Labine; Anupam Kher; Sandra Mae Frank
- Composer: Craig Wedren
- Country of origin: United States
- Original language: English
- No. of seasons: 5
- No. of episodes: 89 (list of episodes)

Production
- Executive producers: Peter Horton; David Schulner; Kate Dennis; David Foster; Michael Slovis; Shaun Cassidy; Aaron Ginsburg
- Producers: Graham Norris; Eric Manheimer; David Declerque; Mark A. Baker; Ryan Eggold
- Production location: New York City
- Cinematography: Stuart Dryburgh; Andrew Voegeli
- Camera setup: Single-camera
- Running time: 43 minutes
- Production companies: Mount Moriah; Pico Creek Productions; Universal Television

Original release
- Network: NBC
- Release: September 25, 2018 – January 17, 2023

Related
- Hayat Bugün - Turkish adaptation (Turkish remake)

New Amsterdam is an American medical drama television series, based on the book Twelve Patients: Life and Death at Bellevue Hospital by Eric Manheimer. The series aired on NBC from September 25, 2018, to January 17, 2023, with 89 episodes over five seasons. The series was created by David Schulner and stars Ryan Eggold, Freema Agyeman, Janet Montgomery, Jocko Sims, Anupam Kher, Tyler Labine, and Sandra Mae Frank.

== Premise ==
New Amsterdam follows Dr. Max Goodwin as he becomes the medical director of one of the United States' oldest public hospitals, aiming to reform the neglected facility by tearing up its bureaucracy to provide exceptional care to patients.

== Cast and characters ==
=== Main ===
- Ryan Eggold as Dr. Maximus "Max" Goodwin, MD, the medical director at New Amsterdam Medical Center
- Freema Agyeman as Dr. Helen Sharpe, MD, Head of the Oncology Department (seasons 1–4; guest season 5) (Note: Agyeman is not credited for her guest appearance in season five.)
- Janet Montgomery as Dr. Lauren Bloom, MD, Head of the Emergency Department
- Jocko Sims as Dr. Floyd Reynolds, MD, Head of the Cardiothoracic Surgery Division
- Tyler Labine as Dr. Ignatius "Iggy" Frome, MD, Head of the Psychiatry Department
- Anupam Kher as Dr. Vijay Kapoor, MD, former Head of the Neurology Department (seasons 1–3)
- Sandra Mae Frank as Dr. Elizabeth Wilder, MD, a deaf surgeon and the newest Chief of Oncology (season 5; recurring season 4)

=== Recurring ===
- Michael Basile as Paramedic Robert Moreland
- Megan Byrne as Gladys Miller, Dr. Frome's secretary
- Christopher Cassarino as Dr. Edward Nottingham, a Senior Resident (later, Chief Resident) in Cardiothoracic Surgery
- Christine Chang as Dr. Agnes Kao, a neurologist who is later promoted to succeed Dr. Kapoor as Head of Neurology
- Mike Doyle as Dr. Martin McIntyre, Dr. Frome's husband who works as an at-home therapist
- Em Grosland as Kai Brunstetter, an ED nurse
- Alejandro Hernandez as Casey Acosta, the Head Nurse of the ED
- Matthew Jeffers as Dr. Mark Walsh, an ED Senior Resident who is later promoted to Chief Resident
- Olivia Khoshatefeh as Dr. Yasmin Turan, an ED Resident
- Keren Lugo as Dr. Diana Flores, an Attending Physician in Cardiothoracic Surgery
- Debra Monk as Karen Brantley, the chairwoman of New Amsterdam's Board of Directors
- Teresa Patel as Paramedic Harvell
- Stacey Raymond as Kerry Whitaker, a paramedic
- Anna Suzuki as Sandra Fall, a billing associate
- Vandit Bhatt as Rohan, Dr. Kapoor's son (seasons 1–2, guest season 4)
- Margot Bingham as Evie Garrison, the associate director of the Legal Department (seasons 1–3)
- Lizzy DeClement as Jemma, psychiatric patient (seasons 1–2)
- Michelle Federer as Millie Tamberlay (seasons 1–3)
- Dierdre Friel as Ella, the mother of Dr. Kapoor's grandchild. She has OCD. (seasons 1–3, guest season 4)
- Zabryna Guevara as Dr. Dora Williams, Dr. Goodwin's assistant (seasons 1–3)
- Nana Mensah as Dr. Camila Candelario (seasons 1–2)
- Lisa O'Hare as Georgia Goodwin, Dr. Goodwin's wife (seasons 1–2)
- Sendhil Ramamurthy as Dr. Akash Panthaki, an oncologist (season 1)
- Emma Ramos as Mariana, an ED resident (seasons 1-3)
- Ron Rifkin as Dr. Peter Fulton, former dean of the hospital (seasons 1–2)
- Jennifer Betit Yen as Aimee Kamoe, an OR nurse (seasons 2–5)
- JJ Feild as Dr. Zach Ligon, a physical therapist (season 2)
- Gina Gershon as Jeanie Bloom (seasons 2–5)
- Daniel Dae Kim as Dr. Cassian Shin, a trauma surgeon (season 3, guest seasons 2 and 5)
- Alison Luff as Alice Healy (season 2)
- Ana Villafañe as Dr. Valentina Castro, the new co-head of the Oncology Department with Helen (season 2)
- Nora and Opal Clow as Luna Goodwin, the daughter of Dr. Goodwin (season 3–5)
- Shiva Kalaiselvan as Dr. Leyla Shinwari (seasons 3–5)
- John McGinty as Dr. Liam Sertic (seasons 3–5)
- Gemma McIlhenny as Maintenance Crew Janice (seasons 3–4)
- Frances Turner as Dr. Linda "Lyn" Malvo, the Head of the OB/GYN Department (seasons 3–5)
- Genevieve Angelson as Dr. Mia Castries, the newly appointed Head of the Holistic Medicine Department (seasons 4–5)
- Michelle Forbes as Dr. Veronica Fuentes, the "New" Medical Director (season 4)
- Conner Marx as Ben Meyer, ASL interpreter who works with Dr. Elizabeth Wilder (seasons 4–5)
- Jackie Roth as Dana Milliner, ASL teacher (season 5, episode 10)

=== Notable guest stars ===
- Frankie J. Alvarez as Carl Jiminez ("Croaklahoma", S1/E15)
- André De Shields as Dale Rustin ("The Legend of Howie Cournemeyer", S3/E7)
- Janet Hubert as Dr. Palpa ("Two Doors", S4/15)
- Bill Irwin as Calvin Bennett
- Peter Jacobson as Bob ("The Empty Spaces", S5/E9)
- Marlee Matlin as Dr. Bev Clemons ("Don't Do This for Me", S5/E10)
- Frankie Muniz as Jace ("Truth Be Told", S4/19)
- Mercedes Ruehl as Grace ("TBD", S5/E1)
- John Douglas as Pizza Guy ("A Seat at the Table", S1/E11)

== Episodes ==
Season	Episodes	Originally released	
Season	Episodes	First released	Last released
1	22	September 25, 2018	May 14, 2019
2	18	September 24, 2019	April 14, 2020
3	14	March 2, 2021	June 8, 2021
4	22	September 21, 2021	May 24, 2022
5	13	September 20, 2022	January 17, 2023

== Production ==
=== Development ===
On September 25, 2017, NBC announced that it had given the production, then titled Bellevue, a put pilot commitment. The pilot was written by David Schulner, who was also set to executive produce alongside Peter Horton. Eric Manheimer, the former medical director at New York City's Bellevue Hospital, was expected to serve as a producer. Universal Television was the production company involved with the pilot. New Amsterdam Hospital is a fictional facility based on Bellevue Hospital in NYC. Bellevue opened in 1736 and thus the oldest hospital in the US. New York was founded as New Amsterdam in the 17th-century.

On January 12, 2018, it was reported that NBC had given the production an official pilot order. It was further reported that Horton was expected to direct the pilot episode. On May 4, 2018, it was announced that NBC had given the production a series order. It was also reported that Pico Creek Productions and Mount Moriah Productions would serve as additional production companies. On October 10, 2018, it was announced that NBC had ordered an additional nine episodes of the series, bringing the first season total up to twenty-two episodes. On February 4, 2019, it was announced during the Television Critics Association's annual winter press tour that the series had been renewed for a second season. In January 2020, NBC renewed New Amsterdam for a third, fourth, and fifth season. On March 14, 2022, it was announced that the series would end after its fifth season, which consisted of 13 episodes.

=== Casting ===
In February 2018, it was announced that Freema Agyeman, Anupam Kher, Janet Montgomery, and Tyler Labine had been cast in lead roles in the pilot. In March 2018, it was reported that Ryan Eggold and Jocko Sims had also joined the main cast. On September 26, 2018, it was announced that Margot Bingham had joined the cast in a recurring role. On November 6, 2018, it was reported that Sendhil Ramamurthy had been cast in a recurring role. On April 19, 2021, it was reported that Frances Turner had been cast in a recurring role for the third season. In August 2021, it was announced that Michelle Forbes, Sandra Mae Frank, and Chloe Freeman, were cast in recurring roles for the fourth season. In May 2022, Frank was promoted to series regular for the fifth and final season.

=== Filming ===
Filming for the series took place at New York City area hospitals including Bellevue Hospital and its surrounding area, Metropolitan Hospital Center, Woodhull Hospital, and Kings County Hospital Center. By October 2018, Universal Television had paid NYC Health + Hospitals, the corporation that oversees New York City's public hospitals, US$665,000 to film in the hospitals. Robert de Luna, a spokesman for Health + Hospitals, said certain areas that are "unoccupied and unstaffed... presents a great opportunity for a production company and a welcome source of revenue for our health system."

On March 12, 2020, production of New Amsterdam and other Universal Television series was halted due to the COVID-19 pandemic. A supply of personal protective equipment used by the series was donated to the New York State Department of Health.

== Release ==
New Amsterdam premiered on NBC on September 25, 2018, at 10 p.m. The second season premiered on September 24, 2019.

The second season's eighteenth episode, "Our Doors Are Always Open" (originally titled "Pandemic"), that was scheduled to air on April 7, 2020, was shelved by NBC, as its subject matter (dealing with a flu pandemic in New York City) was considered sensitive due to the severity of the COVID-19 pandemic in New York state. Schulner felt that "the world needs a lot less fiction right now, and a lot more facts". The final episode completed before the suspension of production would be designated as the season finale, and aired on April 14. The third season premiered on March 2, 2021. The fourth season premiered on September 21, 2021. The fifth and final season premiered on September 20, 2022. The series finale aired on January 17, 2023.

=== Marketing ===
On May 13, 2018, NBC released the first official trailer for the series. On June 22, 2018, a screening of the series was held during SeriesFest, an annual international television festival, at the Denver Art Museum's Lewis I. Sharp Auditorium in Denver, Colorado. The screening was followed by a question-and-answer session with series lead Ryan Eggold and executive producers David Schulner and Peter Horton. It was moderated by Vanity Fair's executive West Coast editor, Krista Smith. On September 10, 2018, the series took part in the 12th Annual PaleyFest Fall Television Previews, which featured a preview screening of the series.

=== Distribution ===
In the United Kingdom, the series premiered its first half of Season 1 on Amazon Video on February 8, 2019. Amazon Video releases the series in binge-ready batches, with further episodes released in May 2019 and November 2019.

It was announced on June 1, 2021, that the show was moving from the Prime Video streaming service to the channel Sky Witness, where it premiered in July 2021.

== Reception ==
=== Critical response ===
On the review aggregation website Rotten Tomatoes, the series holds an approval rating of 34% based on reviews from 32 critics, with an average rating of 5.83 out of 10. The website's critical consensus reads, "Overcrowded, overwrought, and overly familiar, New Amsterdam plays more like an exquisite corpse of pre-existing shows than a breakthrough for the genre – though that may be enough for medical drama devotees." On Metacritic, the series has a weighted average score of 47 out of 100 based on 14 critics, indicating "mixed or average reviews".

Michael Starr of the New York Post wrote: "New Amsterdam will satisfy fans of the genre. It's somewhat predictable, with a moderate dose of prime-time soapiness. But with Eggold's strong performance and an interesting supporting cast, this show could be the right prescription to attract a following." Robert Lloyd of the Los Angeles Times wrote: "It is as baldly manipulative and corny as heck—the pilot ends with a Coldplay song—and even a little ridiculous. But the actors sell it, and the fact that the action can seem so unlikely oddly just makes it more compelling." Caroline Framke of Variety gave the series a negative review, and was critical of Ryan Eggold in particular: "The problem is that no matter how many side characters and plots the series adds into the mix—and it adds a lot—the doctor who's supposed to be its main catalyst for change is so irritating that he ends up overshadowing the more promising elements."

=== Ratings ===
Viewership and ratings per season of New Amsterdam
Season	Timeslot (ET)	Episodes	First aired		Last aired		TV season	Viewership rank	Avg. viewers (millions)
Season	Timeslot (ET)	Episodes	Date	Viewers (millions)	Date	Viewers (millions)	TV season	Viewership rank	Avg. viewers (millions)
1	Tuesday 10:00 p.m. (Note: The season two finale episode aired outside of its regular timeslot at Tuesday 9:00 pm. The nineteenth episode of the fourth season aired on Monday at 10:00 pm.)	22	September 25, 2018	8.39	May 14, 2019	5.54	2018–19	21	10.65
2	Tuesday 10:00 p.m.	18	September 24, 2019	5.91	April 14, 2020	6.03	2019–20	18	9.70
3	Tuesday 10:00 p.m.	14	March 2, 2021	4.19	June 8, 2021	4.10	2020–21	33	6.96
4	Tuesday 10:00 p.m.	22	September 21, 2021	3.72	May 24, 2022	3.45	2021–22	38	6.09
5	Tuesday 10:00 p.m.	13	September 20, 2022	3.22	January 17, 2023	2.83	2022–23	43	5.16

== Home media ==
DVD name	Ep #	Release date
New Amsterdam: Season One	22	August 13, 2019
New Amsterdam: Season Two	18	September 1, 2020
New Amsterdam: Season Three	14	October 26, 2021
New Amsterdam: Season Four	22	TBA
New Amsterdam: Season Five	13	TBA

The first season titled "New Amsterdam: Season One" was released in Australia (Region 4) on August 14, 2019. Region 2 (UK) was released on November 19, 2019. The region 2 release is a five-disc set and the Region 4 release is a six-disc set.

The second season was released in Region 1, via Amazon's Manufacture on Demand (MOD) service, on September 1, 2020.

== Potential spin-off ==
In January 2020, NBC Entertainment chairman Paul Telegdy said, "There is a potential for a spinoff. I can imagine a whole world around New Amsterdam." At that time, Nellie Andreeva of Deadline Hollywood added that no conversations were happening, but members of the production were open to the possibility because of the depth of New Amsterdam characters and stories that could be explored with a spin-off.

On March 19, 2024, it has reported that NBC was pursuing a spin-off medical drama television series for New Amsterdam featuring Max Goodwin's daughter, Luna Goodwin, and the drama was titled New Amsterdam: Tomorrow.

== International versions ==
In 2022, a Turkish adaptation titled Hayat Bugün ("Life Today"), was produced by O3 Medya in association with Universal International Studios. It premiered on the Turkish network Show TV on October 19, 2022, and aired for 8 episodes.
