= Genevieve Angelson =

American TV actress

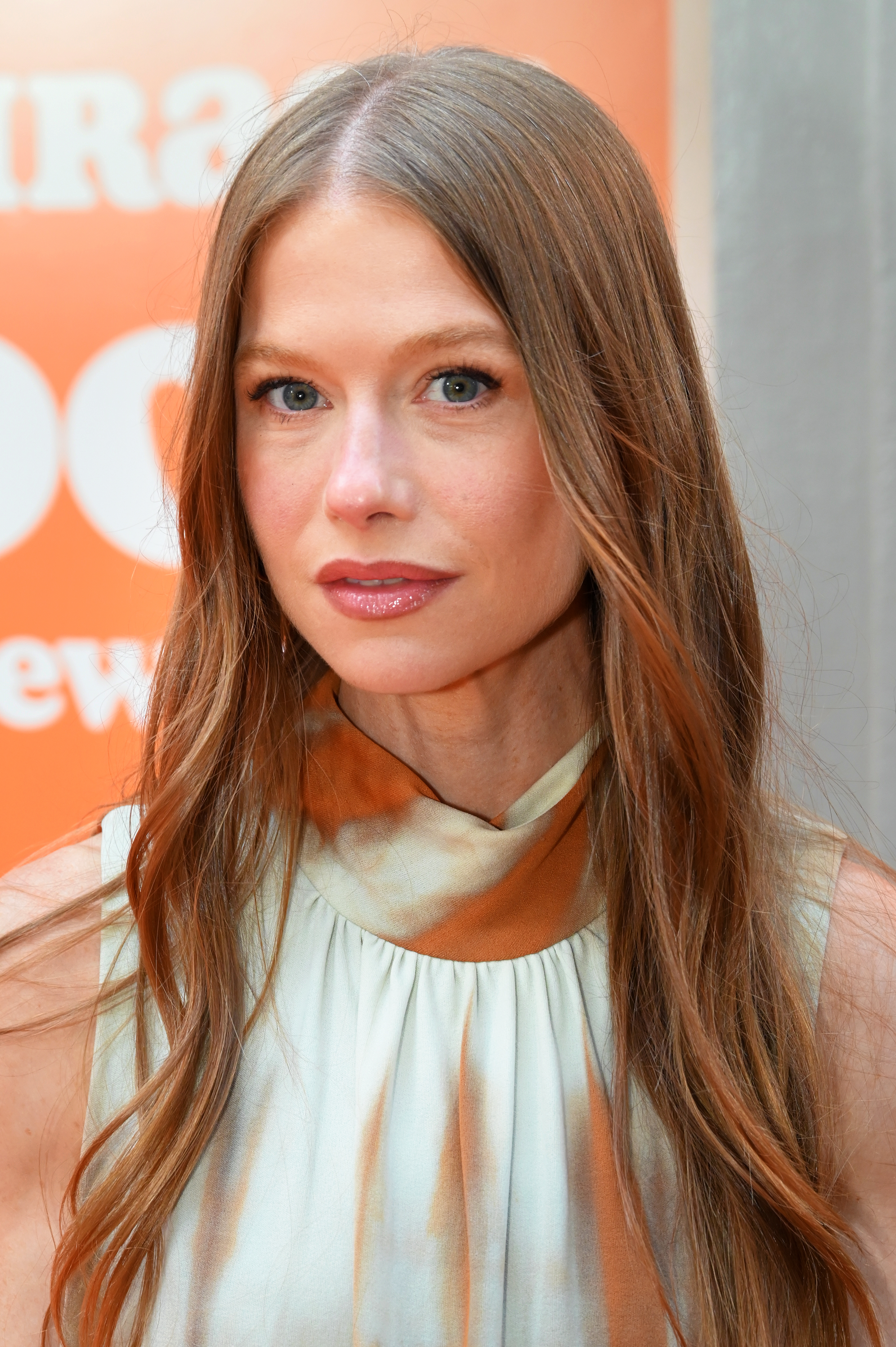
- Angelson in 2026
- Born: New York City, U.S.
- Education: Wesleyan University (BA); New York University (MFA)
- Occupation: Actress
- Years active: 2009–present
- Website: genevieveangelson.com

Genevieve Angelson is an American actress, best known for playing Alanis Wheeler on The Handmaid's Tale, Indigo on The Afterparty, Patti Robinson on Good Girls Revolt, and Ruth on Flack.

== Early life and education ==
Angelson was born in New York City to lawyer and businessman Mark Angelson and his wife, Lynn. Angelson has two elder sisters, Jessica and Meredith. She attended The Brearley School in Manhattan, and graduated Phi Beta Kappa from Wesleyan University and holds a master's degree from the Tisch School of the Arts's Graduate Acting Program.

== Career ==
In September 2013, Angelson was added to the cast of the Showtime series House of Lies as Caitlin Hobart. In 2014, Angelson replaced Mamie Gummer as Det. Nicole Gravely in Backstrom for which Deadline Hollywood named Angelson one of the best casting discoveries of the year. In 2016, she starred in the Amazon Video original series Good Girls Revolt. The series was cancelled by Amazon after one season. She co-starred in The Upside, the American remake of the French film The Intouchables. In 2019, Angelson was cast in Flack, starring alongside Anna Paquin, as well as the second season of the DC Comics show Titans. Variety named Angelson one of the Top Ten TV Stars to Watch. In December 2021, Angelson appeared back to back on primetime NBC in This Is Us and New Amsterdam, recurring on both shows. She is a main cast member of The Afterparty on Apple TV+ created by Phil Lord and Christopher Miller. She plays the leading role of Mae on The Chicken Sisters, adapted from the book by KJ Dell'Antonia.

She originated the role of Nina in Vanya and Sonia and Masha and Spike, winner of the Tony Award for Best Play at the 67th Tony Awards, in which Ben Brantley called her "exquisite." She has appeared in multiple other plays off-Broadway, including The Cake by Bekah Brunstetter at Manhattan Theatre Club and the world premiere of Joe DiPietro's Babbitt at the La Jolla Playhouse.

She is a published writer. Her work has been featured in Town & Country, Refinery29 and Elle.

== Filmography ==
Year	Title	Role	Notes
2010	Army Wives	Heather	Episode: "About Face"
2010	Open Five	Rose	
2013	The Good Wife	Tara Bach	Episode: "A Precious Commodity"
2013	Niagra	Genevieve	Short film
2014	Top Five	Columbia Student	
2014	House of Lies	Caitlin Hobart	
2015	Backstrom	Det. Nicole Gravely	Main cast
2015	True Story	Tina Alvis	
2015–2016	Good Girls Revolt	Patricia "Patti" Robinson	Main role
2017	Odd Girl Out	Emily	Short film
2017	The Upside	Jenny Lacasse	
2017	Relatively Happy	Heather Pepper	Television film
2018	Blue Bloods	Whitney Simmons	Episode: "Erasing History"
2018	Instinct	Katie	Episode: "Secrets and Lies"
2018–2021	Robot Chicken	Crawlers Vendor / Dating Game Contestant / Susie Derkins / Teenager / Barbie Kid / Hatchimals Kid (voice)	4 episodes
2018	Spare Room	Maggie	
2018	Law & Order: Special Victims Unit	Kayla Morgan	Episode: "Hell's Kitchen"
2019–2020	Flack	Ruth	Main cast
2019	Titans	Dr. Eve Watson	2 episodes
2021–2022	This Is Us	Sally	2 episodes
2022	The Afterparty	Indigo	Main cast
2022	New Amsterdam	Dr. Mia Castries	7 episodes
2022	The Handmaid's Tale	Alanis Wheeler	5 episodes
2024	Which Brings Me to You	Eve	
2024	The Chicken Sisters	Mae	Series regular
2026	How to Survive Without Me	Molly Henderson	1 episode
