= The Chicken Sisters =

Hallmark+ family drama

- Genre: Family drama
- Created by: Annie Mebane
- Inspired by: The Chicken Sisters
- Starring: Schuyler Fisk; Genevieve Angelson; Lea Thompson; Wendie Malick
- Country of origin: United States
- Original language: English
- No. of seasons: 2
- No. of episodes: 16

Production
- Executive producers: Annie Mebane; Bradley Gardner; Jamie Goehring; Larry Grimaldi; Ani Kevork; Jameson Parker; Hannah Pillemer; Fernando Szew; Shawn Williamson
- Production companies: MarVista Entertainment; Lighthouse Pictures; Busy B Entertainment

Original release
- Network: Hallmark+
- Release: September 10, 2024 – present

The Chicken Sisters is an American family drama television series created by Annie Mebane. The series is based on the 2020 novel by KJ Dell’Antonia and set in the fictional town of Merinac, and follows the feud between two rival fried chicken restaurant families. It stars Schuyler Fisk, Genevieve Angelson, Lea Thompson, and Wendie Malick. Margo Martindale is the narrator of the series.

The Chicken Sisters premiered on September 10, 2024, on Hallmark+. In January 2025, the series was renewed for a second season. Hallmark Channel began airing season 1 on Sunday nights beginning March 30, 2025. As of June 2026 Hallmark has not released a renewal decision.

== Cast and characters ==
- Schuyler Fisk as Amanda Moore-Hillier
- Genevieve Angelson as Mae Moore
- Lea Thompson as Nancy Hillier
- Wendie Malick as Augusta 'Gus' Moore
- Margo Martindale as the narrator
- Ektor Rivera as Sergio
- James Kot as Frank Hillier Jr.
- Cassandra Sawtell as Frankie Hillier
- Rukiya Bernard as Sabrina Skye
- Samer Salem as Jay
- Caitlin Howden as Shawna
