= Jeremy Kipp Walker =

American film producer, director, and executive

- Occupations: Film producer, director, executive
- Years active: 2000–present
- Employer: LAIKA (2023–present)
- Notable work: Half Nelson, Sugar, Cold Souls, It’s Kind of a Funny Story, Mississippi Grind, Table 19, The Big Sick, The History of Future Folk
- Title: Executive Vice President of Live-Action Production

Jeremy Kipp Walker is an American film producer, director, and executive. His projects have earned two Academy Award nominations, thirteen Independent Spirit Award nominations, three Spirit Award wins, and three AFI Movie of the Year awards. He has held senior production roles at both Netflix and LAIKA, in addition to directing award-winning short films and the cult feature The History of Future Folk.

== Career ==
=== Early work ===
Walker began working in film production in 2000. His producing breakthrough came with Half Nelson (2006), which earned Ryan Gosling his first Academy Award nomination for Best Actor.

He subsequently produced several acclaimed independent films, including:

- Sugar (2008), directed by Anna Boden and Ryan Fleck, recognized as one of the best sports films by The Athletic (via The New York Times), The Hollywood Reporter, Newsweek, Vulture, and Business Insider.
- Cold Souls (2009), starring Paul Giamatti.
- It's Kind of a Funny Story (2010), with Zach Galifianakis and Emma Roberts.
- Mississippi Grind (2015), starring Ryan Reynolds.
- Table 19 (2017), starring Anna Kendrick.
- The Big Sick (2017), which premiered at Sundance, was nominated for the Academy Award for Best Original Screenplay, and became a critical and commercial success.

=== Netflix ===
From 2015 to 2019, Walker served as Head of Production for Netflix’s Independent Film division. During his tenure, he oversaw the scaling of output to more than 100 films, representing an aggregate spend of over $1.2 billion across 23 countries.

After departing his executive role, Walker signed a producing deal with Netflix, where he produced two features for the company, each debuting as the number one film globally on the platform upon release. He also co-founded Netflix’s Emerging Filmmaker Initiative (EFI), an incubator for early-career directors.

=== LAIKA ===
In 2023, Walker joined LAIKA as Executive Vice President of Live-Action Production. Upcoming projects under his supervision include Atmosphere, directed by Anna Boden and Ryan Fleck and based on Taylor Jenkins Reid’s novel; Audition, directed by Lulu Wang and based on Katie Kitamura’s book; Crumble, directed by Brian Duffield; and the untitled directorial debut of screenwriter Jon Spaihts.

== Directing ==
Alongside producing, Walker has collaborated as a co-director with J. Anderson Mitchell on several projects.

Their debut short, Goodnight Bill, won multiple festival prizes and qualified for Academy Awards consideration; Film Threat described it as "funny, touching and on par with any two-hour epic...a brilliant showcase of what short films are capable of achieving in the right hands".

Their follow-up, Super Powers, won the Jury Award at the Tribeca Film Festival and was named one of IndieWire’s “most buzzed-about” shorts. It later gained over one million views online.

The duo expanded into features with The History of Future Folk (2012), a micro-budget science fiction comedy that became a cult hit. The film received a 95% "Certified Fresh" rating on Rotten Tomatoes and was nominated for a Spirit Award. Indiewire ranked it among the "top 5 first features" of the year.

== Filmography ==
=== Producer ===
Year	Title	Notes
2006	Half Nelson	Breakthrough feature; earned Ryan Gosling his first Academy Award nomination
2007	The Passage	Starring Stephen Dorff
2008	Sugar	Widely regarded as one of the best sports films; ranked #9 in The Hollywood Reporter's list of the 25 Movies That Explain the American Soul
2009	Cold Souls	Starring Paul Giamatti
2010	It's Kind of a Funny Story	Starring Zach Galifianakis and Emma Roberts
2013	The History of Future Folk	Micro-budget cult feature; Spirit Award nomination; 95% Certified Fresh
2013	Europa Report	Nominated for the Bradbury Award by the members of Science Fiction and Fantasy Writers of America
2017	Table 19	Starring Anna Kendrick
2017	The Big Sick	Oscar-nominated Sundance breakout
2021	Resort to Love	Starring Christina Milian; #1 Movie Globally on Netflix: July 26 - August 1, 2021
2023	Dog Gone	Starring Rob Lowe; #1 Movie Globally on Netflix: January 16–22, 2023
2024	Elevation	Starring Anthony Mackie; #1 Movie on HBO: February 23 - March 1, 2025

=== Director (with J. Anderson Mitchell) ===
Year	Title	Notes
2005	Goodnight Bill	Award-winning short; Oscar-qualifying status
2006	Super Powers	Won Tribeca Jury Award; IndieWire “most buzzed-about” short
2013	The History of Future Folk	Micro-budget cult feature; Spirit Award nomination; 95% Certified Fresh
