= Jocko Sims =

American actor (born 1981)

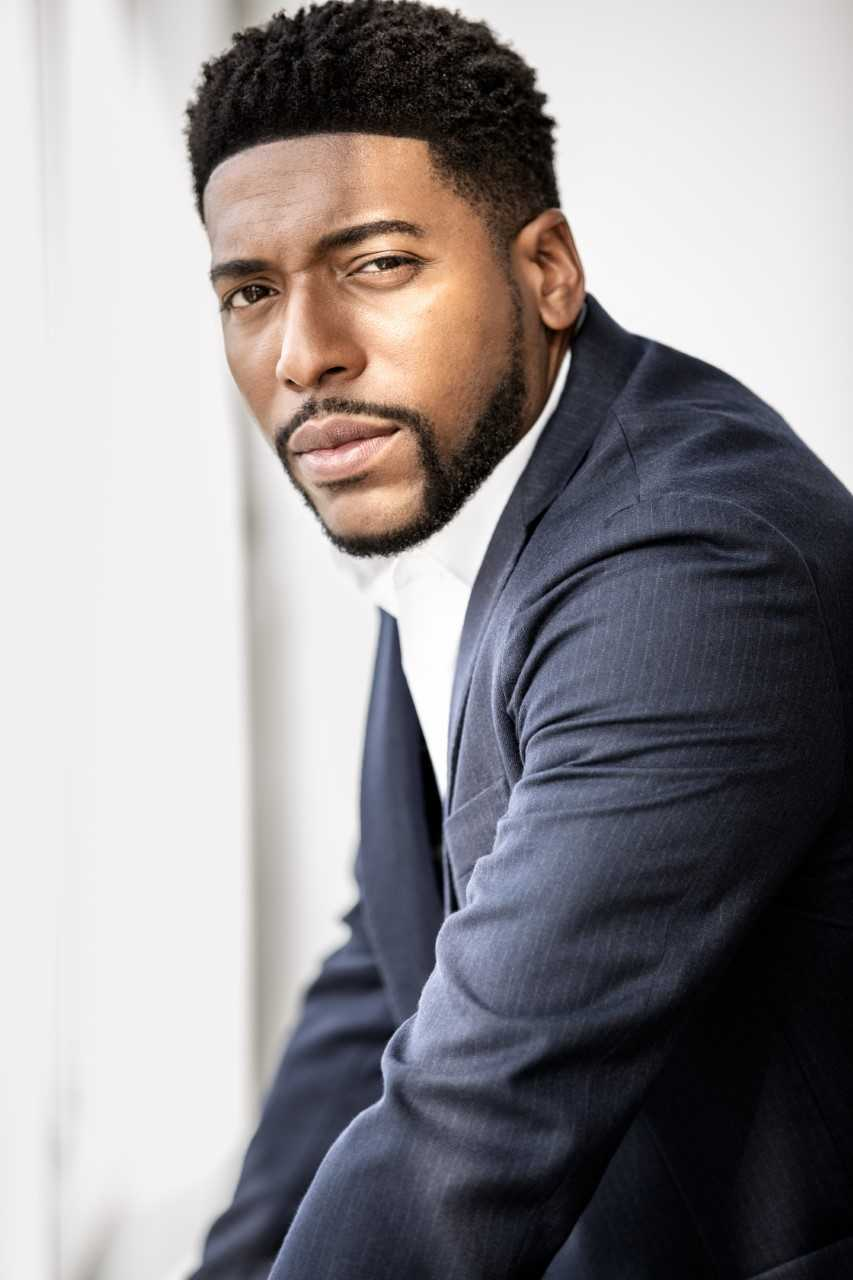
- Sims at the 2016 WonderCon
- Born: Jackie Sims III; February 20, 1981 (age 45); Houston, Texas, U.S.
- Education: School of Theater, Film, and Television - UCLA
- Occupations: Actor; director; producer
- Years active: 2003–present
- Television: Crash; Masters of Sex; New Amsterdam; The Last Ship

Jackie "Jocko" Sims III (born February 20, 1981) is an American actor, known for playing Anthony Adams in Crash and later playing Carlton Burk in the series The Last Ship. On the NBC TV show New Amsterdam, he portrayed Dr. Floyd Reynolds.

== Career ==
=== Movie roles ===
In 2005, he appeared as Julius in Jarhead.

In 2008, he starred in Leon Lazano's award-winning film Something Is Killing Tate.

In 2014, he appeared in the film Dawn of the Planet of the Apes, where he played Werner, the radio operator of the colony.

=== Television roles ===
In 2004, he appeared as a guest in an episode of Cold Case as Lionel Royce, the leader of the "Black Liberation Front" section in Philadelphia in 1969.

In 2008, he joined the main cast of Crash, in which he played Anthony Adams, the music prodigy to Dennis Hopper's character Ben Cenders, until the end of the series in 2009. His portrayal of Anthony Adams, a chauffeur and aspiring hip-hop artist, led to the iTunes release of "Head Up," a song that is performed by Sims in the third episode of the series.

In 2010, he appeared as a guest on Criminal Minds, where he played Tony Torrell, the former landlord and victim of serial killer Kaman Scott (Leonard Roberts).

In 2012, he played Michael Thomas, the brother-in-law of NCIS director Leon Vance, in the series NCIS.

In 2014, he joined the recurring cast of the second season of the series Masters of Sex where he played Robert Franklin, brother of Coral (Keke Palmer) and a civil rights activist. That same year he joined the recurring cast of The Last Ship, where he plays Lieutenant Carlton Burk, the head of Team VBSS of the USS Nathan James. During the second season, he became a main character.

In 2016, Sims joined the cast of I'm Dying Up Here, a dark comedy produced by Jim Carrey. He also shot for the seasons 4 and 5 of The Last Ship.

In March 2018, Sims was cast in the role of Dr. Floyd Reynolds on the NBC medical drama New Amsterdam. The same year, he also appeared as Dr. Ben Wilmot in the Fox medical drama The Resident.

Sims was selected for the role of Dr. George Tann on the Netflix 2026 series Little House On the Prairie.

== Filmography ==
=== Film ===
Year	Title	Role	Notes
2004	Hope's Choice	Dante	Short
2005	Staring at the Sun	Office Worker	Short
2005	Jarhead	Julius	
2006	Dreamgirls	Elvis Kelly	
2008	Something is Killing Tate	Tate	
2009	Turbo	Pharaoh King	Short
2014	Dawn of the Planet of the Apes	Werner	
2015	Petting Zoo	Mr. Brandenburg	
2016	The Sweet Life	Joe	
2017	The Climb	Rev	TV movie
2018	Beyond White Space	Harpo	
2019	Evelyn x Evelyn	Charles	Short

=== Television ===
Year	Title	Role	Notes
2003	10-8: Officers on Duty	DJ at Warehouse	Episode: "Lucy in the Sky"
2004	Cold Case	Lionel Royce (1969)	Episode: "Volunteers"
2004	Yes, Dear	Director	Episode: "A List Before Dying"
2004	Rock Me, Baby	Deejay	Episode: "Love at First Flight"
2004	The Shield	Anquoin	Episode: "What Power Is..."
2004	NYPD Blue	Ben Pines	Episode: "Great Balls of Ire"
2005	Just Legal	Zeke Rawlins	Episode: "The Runner"
2006	CSI: Crime Scene Investigation	Lenny Andretti	Episode: "Time of Your Death"
2007	American Dad!	Ice Pick (voice)	Episode: "Dope and Faith"
2007	Private Practice	Adam	Episode: "In Which Dell Finds His Fight"
2008–09	Crash	Anthony Adams	Main cast
2009	Lincoln Heights	Ethan Wilkes	Episode: "Aftershock"
2009	Grey's Anatomy	Randy Helsby	Episode: "Tainted Obligation"
2010	Bones	Lloyd Robertson	Episode: "The Devil in the Details"
2010	Criminal Minds	Tony Torrell	Episode: "Devil's Night"
2010	Burn Notice	Billy Taylor	Episode: "Brotherly Love"
2011	Detroit 1-8-7	Gimel Hooper	Episode: "Beaten/Cover Letter"
2012	NCIS	Michael Thomas	Episode: "The Good Son"
2012	Franklin & Bash	R. J. Carlton	Episode: "L'affaire Du Coeur" & "650 to SLC"
2012	Covert Affairs	PFC Pete Downey	Episode: "Quicksand"
2013	Emily Owens, M.D.	Sean	Episode: "Emily and... The Teapot"
2013	Castle	Matt Hendricks	Episode: "Valkyrie" & "Dreamworld"
2014	Single Ladies	-	Episode: "Cat and Mouse"
2014	Masters of Sex	Robert Franklin	Recurring cast: season 2
2014–18	The Last Ship	Carlton Burke	Recurring cast: season 1, main cast: season 2-5
2016	MacGyver	Jimmy Green	Episode: "Metal Saw"
2017	I'm Dying Up Here	Melvin	Episode: "The Return"
2018	The Resident	Dr. Ben Wilmot	Recurring cast: season 1
2018–22	New Amsterdam	Dr. Floyd Reynolds	Main cast
2024	How to Die Alone	Alex	Main cast
2025	High Potential	Ronnie Oliver	Episode: "Partners"
2025	Grosse Pointe Garden Society	Tucker	Recurring cast: season 1
2026	Little House On the Prairie	Dr. George Tann	
