= David Schulner =

American television writer and producer

David Schulner is an American television writer and producer best known for creating New Amsterdam.

== Career ==
Schulner's career began in the late 1990s, working on Once and Again. He wrote for multiple television series in different genres. In 2015, he replaced Josh Friedman as showrunner of Emerald City, a dark and edgy version of The Wizard of Oz for Universal Television. Schulner then adapted Twelve Patients: Life and Death at Bellevue Hospital by Eric Manheimer, now titled New Amsterdam, which premiered on September 25, 2018 on NBC and concluded on January 17, 2023 after 89 episodes over five seasons.

His production company is Mount Moriah. The company signed an overall deal with Universal Television.

== Television filmography ==
Year	Title	Writer	Executive Producer	Showrunner	Creator	Notes
1999	Once and Again	Yes	No	No	No	
2002	MDs	Yes	No	No	No	story editor
2003	Everwood	Yes	No	No	No	executive story editor
2003–2004	Miss Match	Yes	No	No	No	
2004–2005	Desperate Housewives	Yes	No	No	No	co-producer
2006	What About Brian	Yes	No	No	No	co-producer
2007	Tell Me You Love Me	Yes	No	No	No	producer
2008	The Oaks	Yes	Yes	No	Yes	
2009	Kings	Yes	Yes	No	No	
2010–2011	The Event	Yes	Yes	No	No	
2013	Do No Harm	Yes	Yes	No	Yes	
2017	Emerald City	Yes	Yes	Yes	No	
2018	Reverie	Yes	Yes	No	No	
2018–2023	New Amsterdam	Yes	Yes	Yes	Yes	
2022	Hayat Bugün	Yes	No	Yes	Yes	Turkish-language remake of New Amsterdam
2026	Memory of a Killer	Yes	Yes	Yes	No	
