= 1908 in archaeology =

| List of years in archaeology | (table) |
- … 1898; 1899; 1900; 1901; 1902; 1903; 1904; 1905; 1906; 1907; 1908; 1909; 1910; 1911; 1912; 1913; 1914; 1915; 1916; 1917; 1918 …
- Art; Archaeology; Architecture; Literature; Music; Philosophy; Science; +...

Below are notable events in archaeology that occurred in 1908.

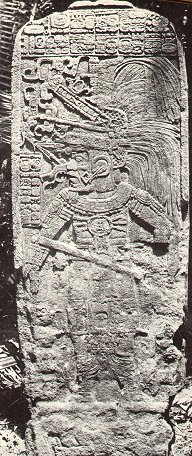
Stela at Seibal, photographed by Teoberto Maler, as published in 1908.

== Explorations ==
- January: Skeleton Cave (Arizona) rediscovered, containing remains of Yavapai massacred in the Battle of Salt River Canyon (1872).

== Excavations ==
- At Avebury in Wiltshire, England, by Harold St George Gray.
- At Knap Hill in Wiltshire, the first excavation of a causewayed enclosure, begun by Ben and Maud Cunnington.
- First excavations at Samaria begun by a Harvard expedition.
- Sakçagözü excavated by John Garstang.
- Ulugh Beg Observatory is discovered in Samarkand by Russian archaeologist V. L. Vyatkin, having been partly destroyed in 1449.

== Publications ==
- A. Hadrian Allcroft - Earthwork of England: Prehistoric, Roman, Saxon, Danish, Norman, and Mediæval.
- Joseph Déchelette begins publishing his Manuel d'Archéologie Préhistorique, Celtique, et Gallo-romaine.

== Finds ==
- 3 July: Phaistos Disc.
- 3 August: "La Chapelle-aux-Saints 1", a 56,000- to 47,000-year-old Neanderthal adult male skeleton, is found at La Chapelle-aux-Saints in central France by Amédée and Jean Bouyssonie and L. Bardon.
- A 40,000-year-old Neanderthal boy skeleton is found at Le Moustier in southwest France by Otto Hauser.
- Venus of Willendorf found by Josef Szombath.
- The largest ever coin hoard is found, 150,000 13th century silver pennies in Brussels.

== Births ==
- November 25: Jia Lanpo, Chinese prehistorian (died 2001)
- December 17: Willard Frank Libby, American developer of radiocarbon dating (died 1980)

== Deaths ==
- May 31: Sir John Evans, English archaeologist (born 1823)
- Frank Calvert, English archaeologist (born 1828)
