= 1904 in archaeology =

List of years in archaeology	(table)
- … 1894; 1895; 1896; 1897; 1898; 1899; 1900; 1901; 1902; 1903; 1904; 1905; 1906; 1907; 1908; 1909; 1910; 1911; 1912; 1913; 1914 …
- In science 1901 1902 1903 1904 1905 1906 1907
- Art; Archaeology; Architecture; Literature; Music; Philosophy; Science; +...

Below are notable events in archaeology that occurred in 1904.

== Events ==
- March 18 – Ancient Monuments Preservation Act 1904 passed in British India.

== Explorations ==
- Leo Frobenius makes an expedition to the Kasai region of the Belgian Congo.

== Excavations ==
- Edward Herbert Thompson dredges artifacts from the Sacred Cenote at Chichen Itza.
- First formal excavations at Aphrodisias in Anatolia, by French railroad engineer Paul Augustin Gaudin, begin.
- Oseberg ship.

== Finds ==
- Tomb of Nefertari discovered by Ernesto Schiaparelli.
- Winter 1904–5 – Inscription in a form of Proto-Sinaitic script, dated to the mid-19th century BCE, discovered in Sinai by Hilda and Flinders Petrie.
- Approximate date – Broe helmet.
- Group of Aphrodite, Pan and Eros in Delos, Greece.
- Fragments of a stele containing the Hymn to Dictaean Zeus, Crete Greece.

== Publications ==
- Rudolf Ernst Brünnow and Alfred von Domaszewski begin publication of Die Provincia Arabia, containing a detailed description of Petra.

== Births ==
- January 19 – Pei Wenzhong, founding father of Chinese anthropology (died 1982).
- February 11 – Alan Sorrell, English archaeological illustrator (died 1974).
- May 6 – Max Mallowan, English archaeologist (died 1978).

== Deaths ==
- March – Alexander Stuart Murray, Scottish archaeologist and museum curator (born 1841).
- November 20 – Luigi Palma di Cesnola, Italian American soldier, diplomat, archaeologist and museum director (born 1832)
