= 1903 in archaeology =

List of years in archaeology	(table)
- … 1893; 1894; 1895; 1896; 1897; 1898; 1899; 1900; 1901; 1902; 1903; 1904; 1905; 1906; 1907; 1908; 1909; 1910; 1911; 1912; 1913 …
- In science 1900 1901 1902 1903 1904 1905 1906
- Art; Archaeology; Architecture; Literature; Music; Philosophy; Science; +...

Below are notable events in archaeology that occurred in 1903.

== Explorations ==
- Thomas Gann makes first scholarly investigation of Lubaantun.
- Raphael Pumpelly explores at Anau in Turkestan.

== Excavations ==
- Excavations at Assur are continued by a team from the Deutsche Orient-Gesellschaft led initially by Robert Koldewey (continue until 1913).
- Excavations at Orchomenus (Boeotia) are begun by a team from the Bavarian Academy of Sciences and Humanities led by Heinrich Bulle and Adolf Furtwängler (continue until 1905).

== Finds ==
- The remains of "Cheddar Man" are found within Gough's Cave in Cheddar Gorge, Britain’s oldest complete human skeleton, dating to approximately 7150 BCE.
- KV43, the tomb of Pharaoh Thutmose IV, and the burial chamber of KV20, the original tomb of Thutmose I, in the Valley of the Kings in Egypt, are discovered by Howard Carter for Theodore M. Davis.
- The first Ramesses III prisoner tiles are found by sebakh-diggers in Egypt.
- Elk's Head of Huittinen, a Mesolithic stone carving, is found in southern Finland.

== Miscellaneous ==
- Salomon Reinach suggests that cave paintings are expressions of "sympathetic magic".
- Cubiculum (bedroom) from the Villa of P. Fannius Synistor at Boscoreale, near Pompeii, with fresco wall paintings (c.50–40 BCE) first installed at the Metropolitan Museum of Art, New York City.

== Publications ==
- G. Baldwin Brown – The Arts in Early England, vol. 1.
- Teoberto Maler – Researches in the Central Portion of the Usumatsintla Valley: report of explorations for the Museum, 1898–1900, vol. 2, completing a detailed description of Yaxchilan and nearby Maya sites (Peabody Institute).

== Births ==
- March 22 – Mary Chubb, English archaeologist and author working in Egypt and the Near East (died 2003)
- August 7 – Louis Leakey, Kenyan paleoanthropologist (died 1972)
- Kenneth Murray, English-born archaeologist working in Nigeria (died 1972)
