= 1902 in archaeology =

List of years in archaeology	(table)
- … 1892; 1893; 1894; 1895; 1896; 1897; 1898; 1899; 1900; 1901; 1902; 1903; 1904; 1905; 1906; 1907; 1908; 1909; 1910; 1911; 1912 …
- In science 1899 1900 1901 1902 1903 1904 1905
- Art; Archaeology; Architecture; Literature; Music; Philosophy; Science; +...

Below are notable events in archaeology that occurred in 1902.

== Excavations ==
- Leopoldo Batres initiates first major excavations at Monte Albán.
- E. A. Wallis Budge begins project at Meroë.
- Ludwig Borchardt leads Deutsche Orient-Gesellschaft excavations at the Ancient Egyptian necropolis of Abusir.
- Georgios Sotiriadis excavates the tomb of the Macedonian warriors at the Battle of Chaeronea (338 BC).

== Finds ==
- May 17 – Antikythera mechanism found by Valerios Stais
- Lansing Man found near Lansing, Kansas on the western bank of the Missouri River
- Etruscan chariot at Monteleone di Spoleto
- Tuxtla Statuette
- Böyük Dəhnə ancient artifacts
- Saimaluu Tash petroglyphs
- Tomb KV45 (Userhet) in the Valley of the Kings in Egypt, discovered by Howard Carter working for Theodore M. Davis.
- Neolithic settlement of Magoula Balomenou near Chaeronea, discovered by Georgios Sotiriadis.

== Miscellaneous ==
- Images of bison on the ceiling of the Cave of Altamira, Spain (discovered in 1879), accepted as authentic of c. 12000 BC.
- Restoration of Lion of Chaeronea begins.

== Births ==
- February 19 – Humfry Payne, English Classical archaeologist (d. 1936).
- May 10 – Ian Richmond, British archaeologist of Ancient Rome (d. 1965).
- August 25 – Clarence Hungerford Webb, American archaeologist (d. 1991).
- Arvid Andrén, Swedish classical art historian (d. 1999).

== Deaths ==
- March 2 – Kate Bradbury Griffith, English Egyptologist (b. 1854)
- October 7 – Henry Syer Cuming, antiquarian, collector and secretary of the British Archaeological Association (b. 1817)

== See also ==
- List of years in archaeology
- 1901 in archaeology
- 1903 in archaeology
