= 1899 in archaeology =

List of years in archaeology	(table)
- … 1889; 1890; 1891; 1892; 1893; 1894; 1895; 1896; 1897; 1898; 1899; 1900; 1901; 1902; 1903; 1904; 1905; 1906; 1907; 1908; 1909 …
- In science 1896 1897 1898 1899 1900 1901 1902
- Art; Archaeology; Architecture; Literature; Music; Philosophy; Science; +...

Below are notable events in archaeology that occurred in 1899.

== Events ==
- 31 December: A large standing stone at Stonehenge falls over.

== Explorations ==
- Tell Halaf, Syria, discovered by Max von Oppenheim.

== Excavations ==
- Excavations of Babylon by Deutsche Orient-Gesellschaft directed by Robert Koldewey begin.
- Excavation of Anglo-Saxon town wall in Clarendon Quadrangle of Bodleian Library, Broad Street, Oxford, England.

== Finds ==
- Chinese oracle bones from the site of Yinxu are identified by Wang Yirong, director of the Imperial College of China, as carrying Shang dynasty writing.
- Roman Empire-related silver plate is found near Qalagah, Azerbaijan.
- Södermanland runic inscription 140.
- Sand quarriers find over 800 fragmentary Neanderthal remains representing at least 12 and likely as many as 70 individuals on the hill of Hušnjakovo in Krapina in the Austro-Hungarian Empire (modern-day Croatia), identified by Dragutin Gorjanović-Kramberger.

== Publications ==
- John Myres - A catalogue of the Cyprus museum, with a chronicle of excavations undertaken since the British occupation, and introductory notes on Cypriote archaeology.
- Ernest-Théodore Hamy - article on the Dumbarton Oaks birthing figure.

== Births ==
- 30 December: Helge Ingstad, Norwegian explorer; co-discoverer of Viking artifacts at L'Anse aux Meadows (d. 2001).
- William Duncan Strong, American archaeologist and anthropologist (d. 1962).

== See also ==
- List of years in archaeology
- 1898 in archaeology
- 1900 in archaeology
