= 1919 in archaeology =

List of years in archaeology	(table)
- … 1909; 1910; 1911; 1912; 1913; 1914; 1915; 1916; 1917; 1918; 1919; 1920; 1921; 1922; 1923; 1924; 1925; 1926; 1927; 1928; 1929 …
- In science 1916 1917 1918 1919 1920 1921 1922
- Art; Archaeology; Architecture; Literature; Music; Philosophy; Science; +...

Below are notable events in archaeology that occurred in 1919.

== Events ==
- 22 May: A. E. Douglass provides the first comparative dendrochronology datings, to Clark Wissler of the American Museum of Natural History for sites in New Mexico.

== Explorations ==
- Julio C. Tello makes the first scientific survey of Chavin de Huantar in Peru.
- Late: Col. William Hawley begins work at Stonehenge in England.

== Excavations ==
- St Piran's Old Church, Perranzabuloe, Cornwall, England.
- Excavation of Tell al-'Ubaid in Mesopotamia by Henry Hall of the British Museum begins.
- 1919–1921: Graig Lwyd Neolithic stone axe factory in North Wales.

== Finds ==
- 12 May: Traprain Treasure of Roman silver found in Scotland.

== Publications ==
- Katherine Routledge – The Mystery of Easter Island: the story of an expedition.

== Births ==
- 13 March: Mualla Eyüboğlu, Turkish restoration architect (died 2009).
- 23 October: Manolis Andronikos, Greek archaeologist (died 1992).

== Deaths ==
- 1 October: Francis J. Haverfield, English Romano-British archaeologist (born 1860).
- 22 November: Sir Guy Francis Laking, keeper of the London Museum (born 1875).
