= 1898 in archaeology =

List of years in archaeology	(table)
- … 1888; 1889; 1890; 1891; 1892; 1893; 1894; 1895; 1896; 1897; 1898; 1899; 1900; 1901; 1902; 1903; 1904; 1905; 1906; 1907; 1908 …
- In science 1895 1896 1897 1898 1899 1900 1901
- Art; Archaeology; Architecture; Literature; Music; Philosophy; Science; +...

Below are notable events in archaeology that occurred in 1898.

== Explorations ==
- Exploration of the site of Assur by German archaeologists begins.

== Excavations ==
- J. E. Quibell excavates the royal residences of various early Egyptian kings at Hierakonpolis in Upper Egypt.
- Excavations at Bremetennacum (Ribchester), Lancashire, England (1898–9).

== Finds ==
- March - Victor Loret discovers Amenhotep II's mummy in his KV35 tomb in Egypt's Valley of the Kings within the original sarcophagus, together with a mummy cache containing several New Kingdom Pharaohs including Thutmose IV, Seti II and Ramesses III, IV and VI.
- Summer - The Bleasdale Circle, a Bronze Age timber and earthwork in Lancashire, England, is discovered by Thomas Kelsall.
- The Withypool Stone Circle (late Neolithic/early Bronze Age) on Exmoor, England, is discovered accidentally by Archibald Hamilton.
- The Narmer Palette is found by J. E. Quibell while excavating the royal residences of various early Egyptian kings at Hierakonpolis in Upper Egypt.
- The site of Karakorum is identified as the former Mongol capital by Nikolai Yadrintsev, who discovers the Orkhon script during the same expedition.
- Willie Peppé, excavating a stupa at Piprahwa Kot, discovers ashes claimed to be of Gautama Buddha.
- Purported finding of the Kensington Runestone in Minnesota.

== Births ==
- 22 August – Jaroslav Černý, Czech-born Egyptologist (d. 1970).
- 14 September – Ernest Nash, born Ernst Nathan, German-born student of Roman architecture and pioneer of archaeological photography (d. 1974).
- 21 December – George E. Mylonas, Greek archaeologist (d. 1988).
- 31 December – J. Eric S. Thompson, English archaeologist, student of the Maya civilization (d. 1975).
- Phoebe Keef (d. 1978)

== Deaths ==
- 21 October – Marianne Brocklehurst, English Egyptological traveller and expedition sponsor (b. 1832).

== See also ==
- List of years in archaeology
- 1897 in archaeology
- 1899 in archaeology
