= 1996 in archaeology =

The year 1996 in archaeology involved some significant events.

== Explorations ==
- Preliminary survey of Buckton Castle in the north west of England.
- A Bronze Age site, al-Moghraqa, was discovered by Moain Sadeq in Gaza Governorate, Palestine.
- December: the Byzantine Church of Jabalia in Palestine is discovered during repairs to the Salah al-Din Road.

== Excavations ==
- July – excavations at Blakhiya Byzantine cemetery in Palestine take place under the auspices of the Department of Antiquities of Gaza and the École Biblique.
- Large-scale, wide-scope horizontal excavations begin at Daepyeong, a large Mumun Pottery Period settlement in Korea (continued until early 2000).
- Excavations near Bogazköy by the Deutsche Orient-Gesellschaft begin (continued until 1999).
- Excavation of the Portuguese nau Nossa Senhora dos Mártires (1605–06) at the mouth of the Tagus begins (continued until 2001).
- First excavation of medieval drain at Paisley Abbey in Scotland.

== Publications ==
- Matthew Johnson - An Archaeology of Capitalism (Blackwell).
- Denise Schmandt-Besserat - How Writing Came About (University of Texas Press).
- Rita P. Wright (ed.) - Gender and Archaeology (University of Pennsylvania Press).
- First issue of e-journal Internet Archaeology.

== Finds ==
- July: Mass grave of victims of the Battle of Towton (1461) in England.
- July 28: Kennewick Man in the United States.
- August 4: Seaton Carew Wreck in England.
- November 21: Pirate flagship Queen Anne's Revenge (run aground 1718) in North Carolina.
- Herxheim archaeological site, a Neolithic Linear Pottery culture ritual center and mass grave at Herxheim in southwest Germany.
- The Keltenfürst (Celtic prince) of Glauberg in Germany, a life-size sandstone statue of a warrior dating from the 5th century BCE.
- Ekron Royal Dedicatory Inscription in Israel.
- Lod Mosaic in Israel.
- Croatian Apoxyomenos off the Croatian islet of Vele Orjule.
- Hermes of Messene in Messene, Greece.
- Ōfune Site, one of the Jōmon Archaeological Sites in Hokkaidō, Japan.
- "Great Dover Street woman" from Roman Britain in London.
- Polychrome wall paintings (dated to 1090) at church of St Mary the Virgin in the deserted village of Houghton on the Hill, Norfolk, England.

== Events ==
- Yale University Bonampak Documentation Project begins at Maya site of Bonampak.
- November 2: Sendai City Tomizawa Site Museum opens in Japan.

== Deaths ==
- January 17- William Lamplough, British archaeologist (b. 1914).
- March 18 - Jacquetta Hawkes, British archaeologist (b. 1910).
- September 23 - Stuart Piggott, British archaeologist (b. 1910).
- November 14 - Martyn Jope, British archaeologist and biochemist (b. 1915).
- December 9 - Mary Leakey, British archaeologist and anthropologist (b. 1913).
