= 1980 in archaeology =

- 1780s ^{.} 1790s in archaeology ^{.} 1800
- ^{.} Archaeology timeline

== Excavations ==
- Aëtos Hill, Menelaion Ridge, Laconia, Greece, takes place under H. W. Catling.
- San Vincenzo al Volturno by the British School of Archaeology at Rome begin (continue to 1986).
- Ain Dara temple, Syria; continues until 1985.
- Excavations begin at Dryslwyn Castle in Wales under the direction of Chris Caple; the dig lasts until 1995 and the results written up in a monograph published by the Society for Medieval Archaeology in 2007

== Finds ==
- 17 February - Derrynaflan Chalice in the south of Ireland.
- 28 March - Talpiot Tomb in Jerusalem.
- August - Wreck of the Breadalbane in the Northwest Passage.
- Wreck of HMS Restoration (1678) on the Goodwin Sands.
- Wreck of the paddle steamer Eric Nordevall in Vättern in Sweden.
- Wreck of American Great Lakes whaleback barge 115 in Lake Superior.
- Frieze at Aphrodisias in Anatolia showing Claudius subjugating Britannia.

== Publications ==
- W. A. McCutcheon - The Industrial Archaeology of Northern Ireland. Belfast: HMSO. ISBN 0-337-08154-9.

== Events ==
- 19 December - Chaco Canyon National Monument is renamed Chaco Culture National Historical Park with 13,000 acres (53 km^{2}) added. The Chaco Culture Archaeological Protection Site program is created to protect Chacoan sites.

== Deaths ==
- January 2 - Rhys Carpenter, American Classical art historian (b. 1889)
- August 24 - André Parrot, French archaeologist of the Near East (b. 1901)
- September 8
  - Willard Libby, American physical chemist, key developer of radiocarbon dating (b. 1908)
  - Keith Muckelroy, British maritime archaeologist, in diving accident (b. 1951)
- November 16 - Don Crabtree, American experimental archaeologist (b. 1912)

== See also ==
- Pompeii
