= 1825 in archaeology =

The year 1825 in archaeology involved some significant events.

== Publications ==
- Faustino Corsi's catalogue of ancient and comparative decorative stone, Catalogo ragionato d’una collezione di pietre di decorazione at Google Books, is published in Rome.

== Finds ==
- Lucien Bonaparte finds the so-called Tusculum portrait of Julius Caesar at Tusculum's forum.

== Births ==
- June 15: John Robert Mortimer, English corn-merchant and archaeologist (d. 1911)
- July 27 - Cyrus Thomas, American ethnologist and entomologist (d. 1910)

== See also ==
- Ancient Egypt / Egyptology
