= Lidster =

Lidster is an occupational surname of British origin, which means a dyer, from the Middle English litster "to dye". The name may refer to:

- Doug Lidster (born 1960), Canadian ice hockey player
- George Lidster (born 1962), American soccer coach
- John Ronald Lidster (1916–2008), British archaeologist
- Joseph Lidster (born 1977), British writer

Lidster may also refer to Illinois v. Lidster, a US Supreme Court decision.
