= 1992 in archaeology =

The year 1992 in archaeology involved some significant events.

== Events ==
- Pointe-à-Callière Museum founded in Old Montreal, Quebec.

== Excavations ==
- Tel Dan.
- Excavations begin at Kuşaklı (Sarissa).
- "Jules Verne" shipwrecks at Marseille.

== Finds ==
- June
  - Villa Mendo Roman Villa at Rio Alto, Portugal.
  - Longyou Caves in China.
- 19 August: The Hydraulis of Dion, an ancient Greek water pipe organ is unearthed in Dion, northern Greece.
- 28 September: Dover Bronze Age Boat, a substantially intact seagoing craft of 1575–1520 BCE, discovered by road construction workers on the south coast of England.
- 16 November: Hoxne Hoard discovered by metal detectorist Eric Lawes in Suffolk, England.
- El Fuerte de Samaipata near Samaipata, Bolivia excavated by Dr. Albert Meyers of the University of Bonn.
- Stone tools 2.6 million years old are first found at Gona in the Afar Depression of Ethiopia.
- First fragments of Ardipithecus ramidus found.

== Publications ==
- Donald B. Redford – Egypt, Canaan, and Israel in Ancient Times.
- Nils Ringstedt – Household Economy and Archaeology: some aspects of theory and applications.
- Lawrence Guy Straus – Iberia Before the Iberians: the Stone Age prehistory of Cantabrian Spain.
- Barrie Trinder (ed.) – The Blackwell Encyclopedia of Industrial Archaeology.

== Deaths ==
- 24 January: Ignacio Bernal, Mexican archaeologist (b. 1910)
- 22 February: Oscar Broneer, Swedish-American archaeologist of Ancient Greece (b. 1894)
- 30 March: Manolis Andronikos, Greek archaeologist (b. 1919)
- 21 April: Nigel Williams, English conservator (b. 1944)
