= Julian D. Hayden =

American archaeologist and excavation contractor

Julian D. Hayden (1911-1998) was an archaeologist and photographer who worked with his father, Irwin Hayden, on the Grewe Site in Arizona, working for the Van Bergen Los-Angeles Museum Expedition. His work with his father was reported in the journal, Kiva, The Journal of Southwest Anthropology and History.

== Life and work ==
Julian D. Hayden was born on January 10, 1911, in Missoula, Montana. He moved to Arizona in 1929 and lived there until his death on March 6, 1998, in Tucson. His father, Irwin Hayden was an archaeologist trained at Harvard, while Hayden never actually had any formal training in archaeology. He did however complete an Associates of Arts from Riverside Junior College.

In 1930, he and his father started work on the excavation of the Grewe site in south-western Arizona (the area around Phoenix and Tucson), to learn more about the Preclassic Hohokam site. This was note-able as the first excavation of a site attributed to what was at the time referred to as the "Red-on-Buff" culture. The father and son duo also worked on other sites such as the Mesa House in Nevada, and Snaketown, which is also in Arizona, from 1934 to 1935. Hayden's work as a photographer began around this time as he took to photographing the sites he was excavating and the objects they recovered. A collection of his work lives in the University of Arizona's Special Collections, and contains his photographs from 1934 to 1942. Snaketown was where he met his wife, Helen Pendleton, and together they had three children. Helen passed away before Hayden in 1977.

For all of his work contributing to the ethnographic studies, Hayden was awarded the Don Crabtree Award for Avocation Archaeology (presumably because he never received formal training an archaeology) in 1988 and was acknowledged for his advocacy of the Sierra Pinacate region by the Friends of Pronatura in 1992, shortly before his death.

== Books authored ==
Hayden had many works in journals, articles, forewords and monographs and a listing was compiled posthumously by Deborah L. Simmons and published in the same issue of Kiva as the work by Mark Hackbarth. His works also include The Sierra Pinacate in 1998, which was a republishing from his original work which was published in Spanish originally.

Posthumously an autobiographical book titled, Field Man: Life as a Desert Archaeologist was published in 2011, from notes and interviews collected over the years with help from his son Steven Hayden, and colleagues Bill Broyles, and Diane Boyer.
