= Leopoldo Batres =

Mexican archeologist

Leopoldo Batres (1852 in Ciudad de Mexico – 1926) was a pioneer of the archaeology of Mexico. He worked as an anthropologist and archaeologist for the Museo Nacional de Antropología between 1884 and 1888, beginning his excavations at Teotihuacan, working on the Temple of Agriculture and the Pyramid of the Moon. Later he worked at Monte Albán, Mitla, La Quemada, Xochicalco, Isla de Sacrificios, Mexico City, and more work at Teotihuacan, including his flawed reconstruction of the Pyramid of the Sun.

Batres, c 1890s

Batres claimed distinguished ancestry, and his father, Salvador Batres was a consul in Germany for President Antonio López de Santa Anna. According to Batres's autobiography, his mother, Francisca Huerta, encouraged his patriotism. Batres joined the Mexican army and was a cavalry officer. In the early 1880s, during the first years of the regime of former army general Porfirio Díaz, Batres went to Paris and studied archeology at the Museum of Natural History under Ernest Théodore Hamy and Armand de Quatrefages, but nothing is known about the nature of his training.

Batres created the first archeological maps of Mexico, one of which was aimed at the 1910 delegates of the International Congress of Americanists, which met in Mexico to coincide with the centenary of Mexican independence. The marking of 110 archeological sites was superimposed on a map of Mexican railway lines. One scholar views the map as highly symbolic, "The ruins of antiquity and train tracks of modernity act like joined metaphors, making reference to the past and present and conveying that Mexico is a nation both ancient and modern."

== Major publications ==
- Antigüedades mejicanas: Falsificación y falsificadores. (1910)
- Arqueología mexicana: Civilización de algunas de las diferentes tribus que habitaron el territorio, hoy mexicano, en la antigüedad. (1888, 1891)
- Cartilla histórica de la ciudad de México. (1893)
- Cuadro arqueológico y etnográfico de la República Mexicana (1885),
- La piedra del agua (1888),
- Excavaciones en la calle de las Escalerillas (1902),
- Exploraciones de Monte Albán (1902),
- Exploraciones en Huexotla, Texcoco (1904)
- El Gavilán, México (1904),
- La lápida arqueológica de Tepatlaxco (1905),
- Teotihuacan (1906).
