= 2001 in archaeology =

This page lists major events of 2001 in archaeology.

== Excavations ==
- March 8–May 28: Recovery of the major portions of the 1967 wreck of hydroplane Bluebird K7 and of the body of its driver Donald Campbell from Coniston Water in the Lake District of England.
- Grinnell College project at Mayapan.
- Excavations at Cival directed by Dr. Francisco Estrada-Belli.
- French archaeologists begin excavating Ulug Depe, an ancient bronze-age agricultural town in Turkmenistan.
- Israeli archaeologists and anthropologists begin excavating Misliya Cave.
- Re-excavation of tomb KV32 in Egypt's Valley of the Kings concludes; it is identified as belonging to queen Tiaa.
- Excavation at Wezmeh Cave in Iran under the leadership of Dr. Kamyar Abdi.
- First archaeological investigation of the wreck of the Danish warship later identified as Gribshunden (sank 1495) in the Baltic Sea.

== Explorations ==
- Innes McCartney begins a survey of German U-boats scuttled off the island of Ireland in the British Operation Deadlight following World War II.

== Publications ==
- Victor Buchli and Gavin Lucas (ed.), Archaeologies of the Contemporary Past. Routledge, 194 pages, ISBN 0-415-23278-3
- Barry Cunliffe, Facing the Ocean: the Atlantic and its Peoples, 8000 BC to AD 1500. Oxford University Press, hardcover, 600 pages, ISBN 0-19-924019-1
- Y. Haile-Selassie (2001). "Late Miocene hominids from the Middle Awash, Ethiopia". Nature. 42 (6843): 179–181. doi:10.1038/35084063. PMID 11449272. S2CID 4432082. (first publication of Ardipithecus kadabba)
- Thomas W. Neumann and Robert M. Sanford, Practicing Archaeology: a Training Manual for Cultural Resources Archaeology. Rowman and Littlefield Pub Inc, August, 2001, hardcover, 450 pages, ISBN 0-7591-0094-2
- Thomas W. Neumann and Robert M. Sanford, Cultural Resources Archaeology: an Introduction. Rowman and Littlefield Pub Inc, December, 2001, trade paperback, 256 pages, ISBN 0-7591-0095-0
- Mike Pearson and Michael Shanks, Theatre/Archaeology|Theatre/Archaeology: Disciplinary Dialogues. Routledge, 240 pages, ISBN 0-415-19458-X
- Donald B. Redford (ed.), The Oxford Encyclopedia of Ancient Egypt. Oxford University Press, hardcover, 3 vols, ISBN 0-19-510234-7

== Finds ==
- July 7: Pottery fragments from 12,000 years BP at Zengpiyan cave site in China.
- July 20: Wreck of HMS Hood (sunk 1941) found by David Mearns in the Denmark Strait.
- November: Ringlemere Cup (Bronze Age) found by metal-detectorist Cliff Bradshaw near Dover, England.
- First fossil fragments of the hominid 'Toumaï' (Sahelanthropus tchadensis; 7 million years BP) found by a team led by Michel Brunet in Chad.
- The Fiskerton log boat found on the banks of the River Witham near Fiskerton, Lincolnshire, England.
- Coin of the short-lived Roman usurper Laelianus in Greenwich Park, England.

== Events ==
- March: Buddhas of Bamyan dynamited by Taliban.

== Deaths ==
- January 3: K. C. Chang, Taiwanese archaeologist; Yale and Harvard professor, author The Archaeology of Ancient China (b. 1931)
- January: Philip A. Barker, British archaeologist and castellologist (b. 1920)
- February 6: Geoffrey Bibby, British archaeologist who discovered Dilmun. (b. 1917)
- March 29: Helge Ingstad, Norwegian explorer; co-discoverer of Viking artifacts at L'Anse aux Meadows (b. 1899)
- July 8: Jia Lanpo, Chinese prehistorian, buried at Peking Man Site in Zhoukoudian, China (b. 1908)
- September 26: Peter J. Reynolds, British experimental archaeologist (b. 1939)
