= Qalagah =

- Municipality
- Location within Azerbaijan
- Coordinates: 40°43′01″N 47°55′57″E
- Country: Azerbaijan
- Rayon: Ismailli

Population
  - Total: 991
- Time zone: UTC+4 (AZT)
  - Summer (DST): UTC+5 (AZT)

Qalagah (also Azerbaijani: 'Qələyə', Qalaya, Kalaga, and Kalagyakh) is a village and municipality in the Ismailli Rayon of Azerbaijan, situated 28 km to the south-west from the rayon centre, on the forepart of Ajinohur mountain. It has a population of 991.

A 1st or 2nd century-related settlement with an area of ca. 30 ha and a cemetery are near Qalagah. In 1899 a silver plate (24 cm in diameter) was also accidentally found during excavations near the village. The plate depicts a mounted Nereid, surrounded by tritons and cupids. Based on its technique and artistic characteristics, the plate is a 2nd or 3rd century example of Roman toreutics. The plate is supposed to be either a trade article of the Caucasian Albania rulers or a gift from the Roman emperors. The artifact was sent to the Imperial Archaeological Commission, then to the Hermitage Museum.
