= 1994 in archaeology =

The year 1994 in archaeology involved some significant events.

== Excavations ==
- National Institute of Anthropology and History excavations at Maya site of Chacchoben begin
- Ruth Shady's work on the Norte Chico civilization site at Caral in Peru begins
- Martin Carver's excavations of an early medieval Pictish monastery at Portmahomack, Scotland, begin
- Jeffrey P. Brain begins work on the Popham Colony

== Publications ==
- Alan K. Bowman – Life and Letters on the Roman Frontier: Vindolanda and its People (British Museum).
- Marc Bermann – Lukurmata: Household Archaeology in Prehispanic Bolivia (Princeton University Press).
- Luigi Luca Cavalli-Sforza, Paolo Menozzi and Alberto Piazza – The History and Geography of Human Genes (Princeton University Press).
- Gillian Hutchinson – Medieval Ships and Shipping (Leicester University Press).
- Naomi F. Miller and Kathryn L. Gleason (ed.) – The Archaeology of Garden and Field (University of Pennsylvania Press).
- John Schofield and Alan Vince – Medieval Towns (Leicester University Press).

== Finds ==
- 26 June – British submarine HMS Vandal, lost on sea trials in 1943, is rediscovered in the Sound of Bute off the west coast of Scotland.
- Late – Marine archaeologists led by Jean-Yves Empereur find remains of the Lighthouse of Alexandria in Egypt.
- December
  - Spotted horses and human hands, Pech Merle cave, Dordogne, France (painted c. 16000 BC).
  - Wall painting with horses, rhinoceroses and aurochs, Chauvet Cave, Vallon-Pont-d'Arc, Ardèche Gorges, France (made c. 25,000–17,000 BC).
- Kafkania pebble.
- Moroccan gold coins and jewellery discovered at Salcombe Cannon Wreck site off the coast of south-west England.
- Diver Colin Martin discovers the wreck of the Hanover (built 1757) off the coast of Cornwall.
- Sannai-Maruyama Site discovered at Aomori, northern Honshu, Japan (mainly of Jōmon period).
- Recovery of Homo antecessor skeletal remains from the Trinchera Dolina at the archaeological site of Atapuerca in northern Spain begins; these are the oldest known hominid fossils found in western Europe (between 850,000 and 780,000 years old).
- 'Ardi', the fossilized skeletal remains of a female Ardipithecus ramidus, discovered at Aramis, Ethiopia, in the Afar Depression, the oldest known hominid fossil (4.4 million years old).
- First of the Schöningen spears.

== Other events ==
- 16 January – British archaeological television series Time Team first shown on Channel 4.
- 12 March – Kabul Museum building hit by rocket fire and destroyed.
- ASPRO chronology published.
- The British Library acquires the Kharosti scrolls, the oldest collection of Buddhist manuscripts in the world.

== Deaths ==
- 10 March – Rupert Bruce-Mitford, English archaeologist (b. 1914)
- 27 March – Elisabeth Schmid, German archaeologist and osteologist (b. 1912)
- 8 September – Margaret Guido, English archaeologist (b. 1912)
- 10 October – Richard J. C. Atkinson, English archaeologist and prehistorian (b. 1920)
