= 2016 in archaeology =

This page lists major archaeological events of 2016.

== Excavations ==
- January–June – 81 Anglo-Saxon wooden coffin Christian burials of the 7th/9th centuries are excavated in an unusually well-preserved state at Great Ryburgh in Norfolk, England.
- January 12 – Announcement of the discovery and excavation of two roundhouses in an exceptionally good state of preservation at Must Farm Bronze Age settlement in The Fens of eastern England.
- February 19 – Announcement of the discovery and excavation of a largely complete wheel at Must Farm Bronze Age settlement.
- April 17 – Announcement of the discovery and initial excavations of an exceptionally large Roman villa, well-preserved, at Brixton Deverill in Wiltshire, England.
- Summer – Excavation of Early Middle Ages sites at Tintagel Castle on the coast of Cornwall.
- November 3 – Announcement of the discovery of a Bronze Age city in Bassetki, Iraq.
- November 24 – Announcement of the discovery of an Early Dynastic Period city and graves near Abydos, Egypt.
- November 30 – Announcement of the excavation of a Black Death plague pit at Thornton Abbey in eastern England.
- Ancient Black Sea shipwrecks – The Black Sea Maritime Archaeology Project is initiated; within a few months it locates and investigates 41 shipwrecks off the Bulgarian coast of the Black Sea, some dating date back to Byzantine times.
- Practice trenches probably dug by Australian troops in 1916 at Larkhill on Salisbury Plain in England are excavated.
- Foundations of an Anglo-Saxon house at Long Wittenham in the Thames Valley of England are excavated.
- Tomb of King Denis of Portugal (d. 1325) in St. Denis Convent, Odivelas, is opened.

== Finds ==
- March
  - Announcement of the discovery of a Bronze Age burial site near Morecambe Bay in England.
  - Wrecks in Portsmouth Harbour (England) are identified as World War I German destroyers V44 and V82.
- June 1 – Archaeologists announce identification of one of the Roman Bloomberg tablets found during 2010–13 excavations in advance of construction of new Bloomberg London offices in the City of London as the oldest known hand-written document in the United Kingdom, dating back to 57 CE.
- June 25 – Anglo-Saxon name stone at site of Lindisfarne monastery.
- July
  - A 7-week-old wolf pup from 57,000 years BP is found perfectly preserved in permafrost in the Klondike, Yukon in northwest Canada.
  - Flower found as part of a Bronze Age votive offering in Lancashire, England.
- September 3 – The second ship of Franklin's lost expedition, HMS Terror (1813), is located.
- September 26 - Ten coins (including four Roman and one Ottoman) are found in Katsuren Castle, Okinawa, Japan.
- September – Wreck of whaleback freighter SS Clifton, lost in 1924, is located in Lake Huron.
- October – An Imperial German Navy U-boat, probably SM UB-85 (sunk 1918), is found off the west coast of Scotland.
- December – Leekfrith torcs in Staffordshire, England.
- Wreck of "WA08", a later 19th-century ship carrying Cornish slate, on West Barrow sandbank in the Thames Estuary of England.

== Events ==
- October 3 – Announcement that the mound of the motte-and-bailey castle at Skipsea Castle in the East Riding of Yorkshire, England is an Iron Age earthwork, the largest in Britain.

== Deaths ==
- March 6 – María Rostworowski, Peruvian historian (b. 1915).
- March 20 – Stanley South, American archaeologist (b. 1928).
- April 7 – Charles Thomas, Cornish prehistorian (b. 1928)
- July 5 – Beatrice De Cardi, British archaeologist of Asia (b. 1914).
- September 26 – Don Brothwell, British archaeologist (b. 1933)

== See also ==
- List of years in archaeology
