= Medical Ostraca of Deir el-Medina =

Collection of ostraca from the ancient Egyptian village of Deir el-Medina

The Medical Ostraca of Deir el-Medina are a collection of ostraca containing notes of medical importance. These ostraca were written in the New Kingdom Egyptian village of Deir el-Medina during the 18th and 19th Dynasties (c.1550 – c.1190 BCE). Unlike other sources of medical literature from the period, these ostraca are notes written by and concerning the artisans of Deir el-Medina, rather than physicians or royalty. Thus, they offer a unique view of the common experience of medicine in Ancient Egypt.

== The Ostraca ==
The medical ostraca were written in the New Kingdom during the 18th and 19th dynasties. As such, they are written in hieratic script on flat pieces of stone or broken pottery, which served as a convenient and cheap writing surface. The artisans and villagers who lived in Deir el-Medinah made use of this plentiful source of writing material to write down prescriptions, letters, and even semi-official documents such as lists noting the days and reasons for a particular worker's absence. Because of the resilience of the material used to write them, as well as the dry and warm climate of Egypt, many of the ostraca have been preserved in good condition for many centuries. However, due to their beauty and relatively small size, they are naturally desired as souvenirs, and it is estimated that perhaps as many as half of the documents found at Deir el-Medina were removed without the knowledge or authorization of the team director. Also, unlike other medical documents from the period such as the Ebers Papyrus, these ostraca are unique. Information lost through time or vandalism cannot usually be regained by checking them against another, similar document. These medical ostraca currently reside in a number of museums around the globe, including the British Museum and the University College London.

The Medical Ostraca of Deir el-Medina include:

- O British Museum 5634—A list of workers absent from work. It lists absences due to illness, and shows that one specific man served the community as a doctor.
- O University College London 3 -- A letter to a priest from a scorpion charmer, asking for the ingredients to mix a remedy.
- O Berlin P 11247—A letter from a father to his son, asking for help in treating his blindness.
- O Gard 177—A letter from a doctor to a patient who claimed to never have received needed treatment.
- O DeM 1091—A compilation of prescriptions for various ailments.

== History ==
=== Ancient history ===
Deir el-Medina was a planned village, which was created on the west bank of the Nile River, across from the Egyptian city of Thebes. Historical evidence suggests that the village was founded during the reign of Thutmose I, who wished to secure a steady community of workers and artisans to build the royal tombs in the nearby Valley of the Kings. Because of their important role in building the tombs for the pharaohs, Deir el-Medina's residents received a better education and more money than their counterparts in other towns. This led to a highly literate society capable of producing the wealth of ostraca that were later found (including ostraca revealing a common person's experience of medicine, which otherwise would never have been created).

=== Modern history ===
The archaeological site of Deir el-Medina was first seriously excavated by Ernesto Schiaparelli in 1905. It was during this series of excavations that large amounts of ostraca were first found. Between 1922 and 1951, a French team directed by Bernard Bruyère excavated the entire site, including the village, the dump and the cemetery. During these excavations, a massive wealth of ostraca were found. It was not until later that historians and Egyptologists (such as A.G. McDowell) began to sift through the ostraca, and sort them into groups related to literature, daily life, and medicine.

== Content ==
=== Medical and societal implication ===
Unlike every other medical document from Egypt during this period, these medical ostraca were not written solely as a professional resource to be known and used by doctors; rather, these ostraca grant a unique view of the medical perceptions of an entire cross-section of Egyptian society. They show the intermixing of scientific and magical medicine—specifically when a scorpion charmer, who specializes in the magical cure of scorpion bites, sends a letter seeking medical ingredients. At the same time, the ostraca portray a division between medical and magical treatment, by showing the existence of a medical doctor who is separate from the magical scorpion charmer himself.

It is also important to note that these ostraca show the medical experience of the common man, rather than the professional healer. A man asking his son for assistance in procuring the ingredients to cure his blindness, demonstrates the modicum of medical knowledge that existed in the community at large. And the large number of magical spells used to treat disease are evidence that magical treatments were often taught from common man to common man, without any "trained" intermediary.

Thus, these ostraca portray a society with an advanced system of medicine and treatment. However, the means of curing the sick were not held only in the hands of the few trained healers. Those few trained healers were reserved to treat the more serious cases, and asked to spend days creating the complicated cures. Meanwhile, the common man could go to his son, or friend, for help in finding treatment.

==== Remedies and treatments ====
Examples of remedies found in these medical ostraca include:

Scorpion sting
One grain (a fetish), one Jar of Syrup, and One Festival Date-Juice.
Blindness
Honey, dried Ochre, and Real Black Eye-paint.
Rash
Leaves of Acacia and Wax, smeared on the rash in the morning for four days.
Cough
Grapes

== See also ==
- Ancient Egyptian medicine
- Deir el-Medina
- Egyptian medical papyri

== Bibliography ==
- Bard, Kathryn. Introduction to the archaeology of ancient Egypt. Malden, MA : Blackwell Pub., 2007.
- Ghalioungui, Paul. Magic and Medical Science in Ancient Egypt. New York: Barnes & Noble, 1965.
- Janssen, Jac. J. "Absence from Work by the Necropolis Workmen of Thebes" Studien zur Altägyptischen Kultur bd. 8 (1980): 127–152.
- Lesko, Leonard H. Pharaoh's Workers: The Villagers of Deir El Medina. New York: Cornell University Press, 1994.
- McDowell, A.G. Village Life in Ancient Egypt: Laundry Lists and Love Songs. London: Oxford University Press, 1999.
- Ritner, Robert K. "Innovation and Adaptations in Ancient Egyptian Medicine" Journal of Near Eastern Studies 59, no. 2 (April 2000): 107–117.
