= F. O. Oertel =

German-born British architect, civil engineer and archaeologist (1862–1942)

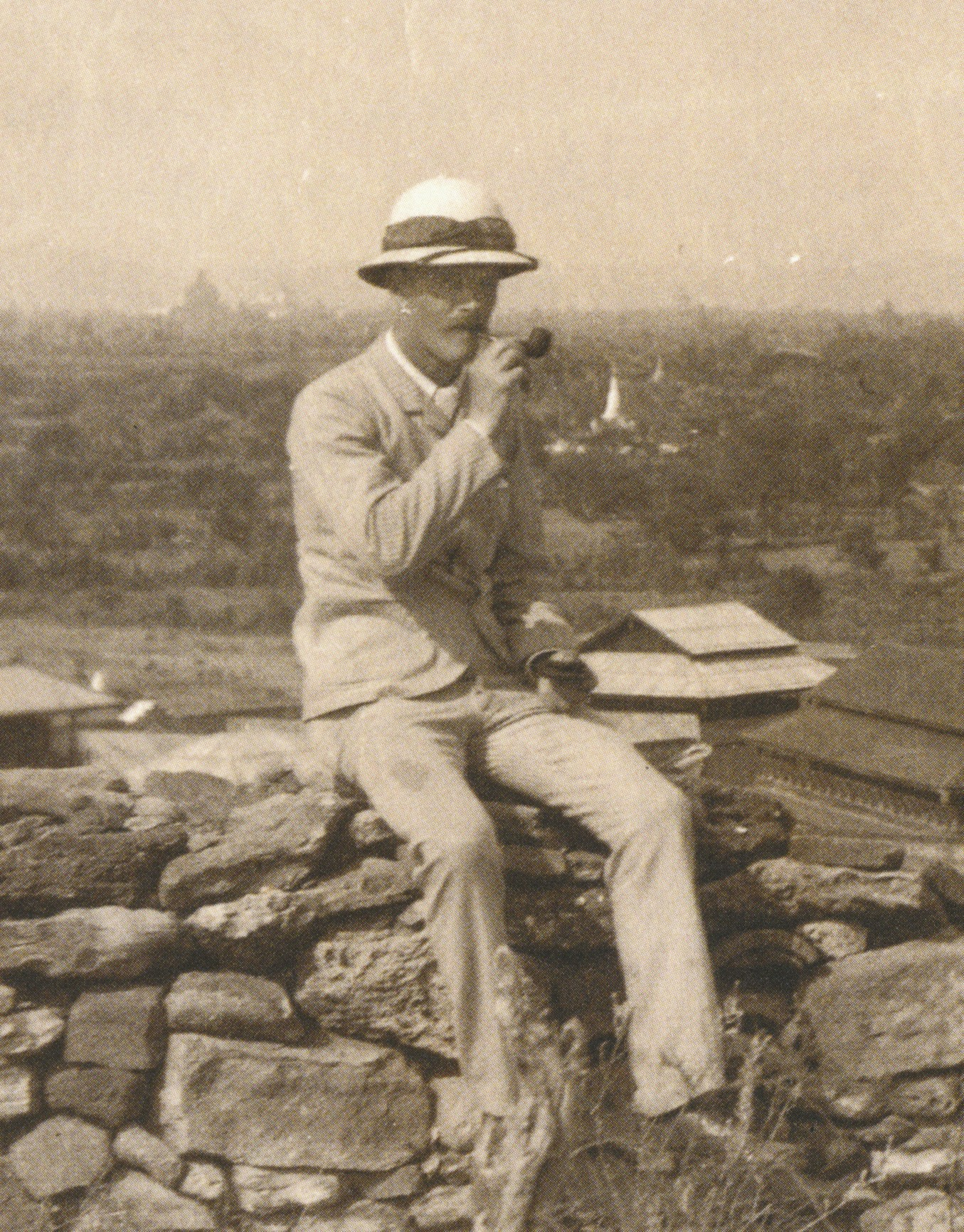
Oertel in Pagan (1892)

Friedrich Oscar Oertel (9 December 1862 – 22 February 1942) was a German-born British engineer, architect, and archaeologist. He is best known among Indian art historians and archaeologists for having excavated the archaeological site of Sarnath (India, Uttar Pradesh) in the winter of 1904–1905. It was here that in March 1905 he unearthed the Lion Capital of Ashoka of an Ashokan pillar, which was to become the national emblem of India. However, probably because he was mainly involved as a civil engineer and architect in the Public Works Department, his contributions to the fields of art history and archaeology are largely overlooked in the historiography of South Asian art and archaeology.

== Early life ==
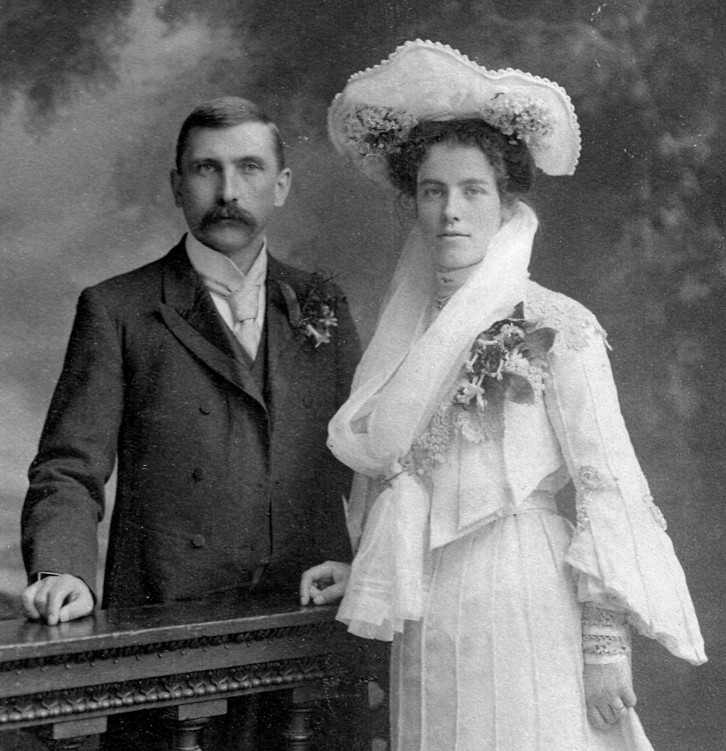
Oertel and his wife Margaret H. Lechmere, 25 July 1903

Friedrich [Frederick] Oscar Emanuel Oertel was born 9 December 1862 in Hannover, Kingdom of Hanover. He renounced his German citizenship before leaving for India as a young man and was naturalised British. He married Margaret Haywood Lechmere (1882–1969) on 25 July 1903, with whom he had two children. Retiring around 1920, he returned to England and from 1921 added the name of his wife to his own, thus publishing under the name of "F.O. Lechmere-Oertel". He died in New York on 22 February 1942.

== India: 1883-1920 ==
Oertel left Germany for India where he studied at the Thomason College of Civil Engineering (now Indian Institute of Technology Roorkee). From March 1883 to March 1887, he was assistant engineer on railway and building construction for the Indian Public Board, being posted to the North-Western Provinces and Oudh. From 1887 to 1888, he returned to England where he studied architecture under Richard Phené Spiers. On his way back to Europe he was nearly killed on 17 April 1887, when the P&O Tasmania (de) which he had boarded sailing from Bombay (today Mumbai) to Marseille, sunk on the south-western coast of Corsica.

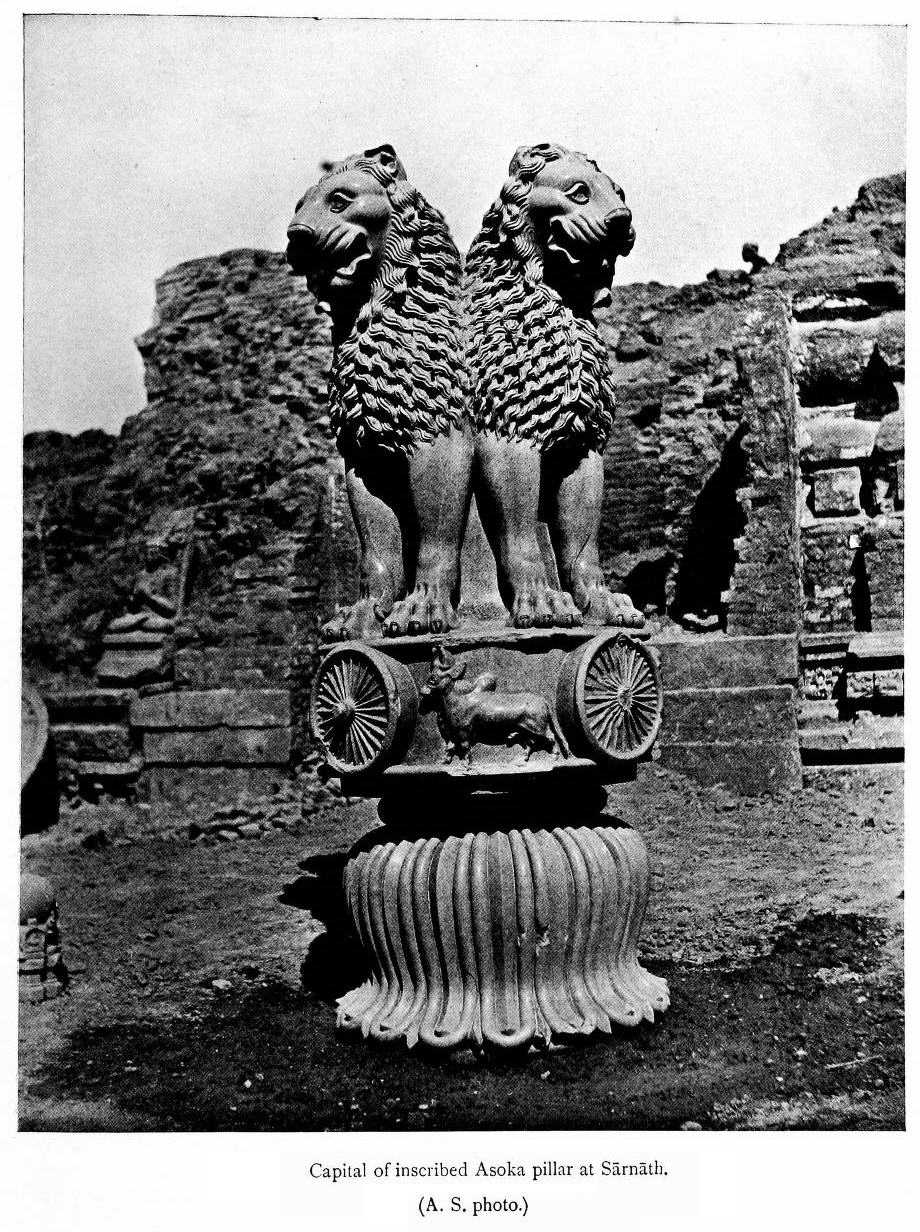
The Lion Capital of Ashoka on the ground at Sarnath, before 1911, probably 1904-05

Oertel then started upon a brilliant career in the Public Works Department, being first sent on diverse missions and then appointed in various locations. Sent by the Government of the North-Western Provinces and Oudh, in the winter of 1891–92 he surveyed the monuments and archaeological sites in North and Central India before reaching Rangoon in Burma Province in March 1892. Then, and in the following month, Oertel visited Mandalay, Amarapura and Sagaing, from where he travelled down the Irrawaddy River to Pagan and Prome (today Pyay). Back in Rangoon, he travelled south to Pegu (today Bago), Moulmein (today Mawlamyaing), Martaban (Mottama) and Thaton. On his return, he wrote a lengthy report illustrated with original photos which was published as Note on a Tour in Burma in March and April 1892. The photographs he took during this journey also were used to illustrate George W. Bird's book Wanderings in Burma, published a few years later, along with photos by Felice Beato.

In 1900, he was sent to Sri Lanka by the Royal Asiatic Society to visit the Abhayagiri dagoba and make suggestions on the best way to preserve or restore it. As Executive Engineer in the "Buildings and Roads" branch of the Public Works Department, North-West Provinces and Oudh from 1902 on and then as Superintending Engineer after 1908, he was posted in various places of Uttar Pradesh: from 1903 to 1907, he was in Benares, in 1908 he was located in Lucknow, and from 1909 to 1915, in Cawnpore; he was then sent to Shillong, Assam, where he remained up to 1920. Throughout this period he was also involved in supervising or participating in the construction of numerous buildings in Uttar Pradesh (Allahabad, Agra, Lucknow, Cawnpore). This firsthand experience helped him to formulate his opinion concerning the construction of the new capital at New Delhi, which he made public with a lecture delivered before the East India Association at Caxton Hall, Westminster, on 21 July 1913. There he strongly advocated that the architects of New Delhi should be inspired by a "really national Indian style".

Oertel was a member of various associations: the Institution of Civil Engineers (1889), the Royal Asiatic Society of Great Britain and Ireland (1900), and the Deutsche Morgenländische Gesellschaft (1908). Further, he became an Associate of the Royal Institute of British Architects in 1888 and Fellow of the same institute in 1901. While posted at Benares, Oertel undertook several public works, such as the construction of a road leading to Sarnath, construction of a shelter for the sculptures found at Sarnath, transfer of the images kept in the Queen's College to this site, and excavation of the site. Following his excavations, he was transferred to Agra – John Marshall, the then General Director of the Archaeological Survey of India, taking over the Sarnath excavations – where he worked on preservation of the Agra Fort in the years 1905–06. In 1909–10, he surveyed the Rikhian caves in Uttar Pradesh.

During the Royal Tour of 1905–06, Oertel guided the Prince and the Princess of Wales (later King George V and Queen Mary) around the Agra Fort on 18 December 1905 and accompanied the Princess on her visit of the Sarnath excavations, while the Prince and the Princess were in Benares from 18 to 21 February 1906. In August 1908, he took part in the Fifteenth International Congress of Orientalists in Copenhagen, where he presented his excavations at Sarnath. In 1909, he was still on furlough in Europe where he visited glass factories in England, Germany, and Austria, publishing a short monograph on the topic in 1915, where he advocated that this industry should be developed in India. Oertel then became Chief Engineer and Secretary to the Public Works Department of the Government of Assam and this position provoked debate, because Oertel was German by birth and as Germany and England were at war during this time.

== Contribution to Indian art and archaeology ==
Beside his report on the monuments of Burma published in 1893, Oertel is best known for the excavation of Sarnath done from December 1904 up to April 1905. Not only did he unearth the Maurya capital on 15 March, but he also brought to light numerous major images dating from the 4th up to the 12th century.

Oertel left Sarnath for Agra where another major task awaited him: the restoration of the Diwan-i-Amm and Jahangiri Mahal in the Agra Fort and the reconstruction of the four minarets of the south gateway of the Akbar tomb in Sikandra in 1905–1906 while also working on the compound of the Taj Mahal, all work undertaken under the impetus of Lord Curzon as preparation to the visit of the Prince and Princess of Wales.

In 1909–1910, Oertel documented the sculptures of Yoginis at Rikhian (Rikhiyan) in Banda, now Chitrakoot district of Uttar Pradesh and also took an interest in the monuments located at Garhwa in the Allahabad district.

== After India ==
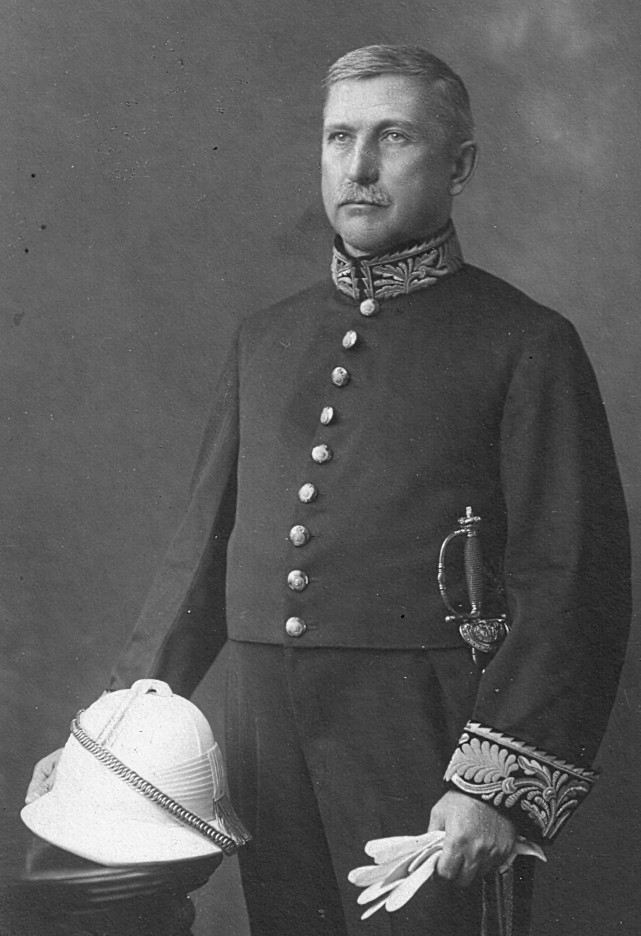
F.O. Oertel, September 1930

Oertel apparently returned to the United Kingdom in 1921, having retired from the Public Works Department. Until around 1928, he lived in Teddington, naming his house "Sarnath", and gave lectures on India. In 1930, i.e. probably before departing for Abyssinia, he donated numerous artefacts to the Museum of Archaeology and Anthropology, University of Cambridge which he had collected as well as a large collection of gelatin photographs which he had made while posted in India.

C. W. Martin, minister to the emperor Haile Selassie, whom Oertel must have met in London, invited him to Abyssinia, where he lived from 1930 to 1932. In January 1933, he travelled to India where he spent three months with his daughter, showing her the country where he had lived; the journey concluded with a visit to his brother, Charles (Carl) Hermann Oertel, who was barrister-at-law in Lahore. There both Oertel and his daughter stayed one full month before returning to Cyprus, where he settled in July 1933. In the winter of 1935–36 he travelled to Japan, staying in Nara. He then went to South America, probably visiting his daughter Joan, married to a Dr. R.L. Cheverton, whom she had met in Cyprus and who lived in the Falkland Islands. In December 1936 and January 1937, Oertel resided in Malta, where a lengthy biographical paper was devoted to him by the Times of Malta in its issue of 16 December. While there he also delivered a lecture on Abyssinia at the university.

Oertel went back to England when his son married in 1938, meeting his wife for the last time before going to Portugal, the West Indies and Kingston, Jamaica and New York, where he arrived in June 1940.

== Bibliography of Oertel's publications (chronological) ==
- Oertel, F. O. (April 1893). Note on a Tour in Burma in March and April 1892. Rangoon: Superintendent Government Printing, Burma.
- Report on the Restoration of Ancient Monuments of Anuradhapura, Ceylon, Colombo: George Justin Athelstan (GJA) Skeen, 1903. (13 pages), republished in: S. M. Burrows & F.O. Oertel, Reports on archaeological work in Anuradhapura and Pollonnaruwa 1886–1903, Colombo: G.J.A. Skeen, n.d.
- Oertel, F. O. (1908). "Excavations at Sarnath". Archaeological Survey of India: Annual Report 1904–1905. Calcutta: Superintendent Government Printing, India. pp. 59–104.(with the note on sculptures and inscriptions mainly due to J.Ph. Vogel as mentioned in footnote 1 p. 78). Separately reprinted as: Buddhist Ruins of Sarnath near Benares, Calcutta: Supdt Govt Press, 1908 (1908b).
- Nicholls, W.H., "(1) Conservation of Muhammadan buildings in the United Provinces and Panjab and at Ajmer", Annual Progress Report of the Archaeological Surveyor, Northern Circle, for the year ending 31st March 1906, pp. 17–28. Includes long quotes from Oertel's report on his work at the Fort of Agra.
- "Some remarks on the excavations at Sarnath carried out in the year 1904-5", The Indian Antiquary, vol. 37, 1908, pp. 277–280. A paper read at the Fifteenth International Congress of Orientalists in Copenhagen, August 1908.
- "Indian architecture and its suitability for modern requirements: a paper read before the East India Association with discussion", The Asiatic Quarterly Review, New Series, vol. II/3 & 4, July–October 1913, pp. 376–406. A paper read at the East India Association at Caxton Hall, Westminster, on 21 July 1913.
- Notes on the glass industry in Europe made in the course of some tours through the glassmaking districts of England, Germany and Austria, Allahabad: Luker, 1915.
- "The Story of an Ethiopian, Azaj Wargneh C. Martin", The Times of Malta, 27 December 1936, pp. 9–10.

== Bibliography ==
- Annual Progress report of the Superintendent of the Archaeological Survey, Northern Circle for the year ending 31st March 1910, Lahore: Punjab Economical Press.
- Bird, George W., Wanderings in Burma, With Illustrations and Maps, Bournemouth/London: F.J. Bright & Son/Simpkin, Marshall, Hamilton, Kent & Co., Ltd., 1897.
- Cheverton, R.L. (Mrs), "From Friedrichshafen to Rio de Janeiro, A Trip By The 'Graf Zeppelin'", The Times of Malta,20 December 1936, pp. 8–9.
- Dehejia, Vidya, Yogini Cult and Temples, A Tantric Tradition, New Delhi: National Museum, Janpath, 1986.
- Directory of British Architects 1834–1914, volume 2: L-Z, London: Continuum (Royal Institute of British Architects), 2001, pp. 27–28.
- "India's Glass Trade", The Singapore Free Press and Mercantile Adviser, 14 June 1915, p. 7 (https://eresources.nlb.gov.sg/newspapers/Digitised/Article/singfreepressb19150614-1.2.46.aspx).
- Guha, Sudeshna (ed.) 2010, The Marshall Albums, Photography and Archaeology, London/New Delhi/Ocean Township, NJ: The Alkazi Collection of Photography in association with Mapin Publishing, 2010.
- List of Associate Members of the Institution of Civil Engineers, London: Institution of Civil Engineers, 1904 (https://web.archive.org/web/20131020063425/http://home.ancestry.co.uk/).
- "List of Members of the Royal Asiatic Society of Great Britain and Ireland": included in the 1903 to 1938 issues of The Journal of the Royal Asiatic Society of Great Britain and Ireland.
- Metcalf, Thomas R., An imperial vision. Indian architecture and Britain's Raj, Berkeley: University of California Press, 1989.
- National Probate Calendar for 1942 (http://www.ancestry.co.uk/cs/uk/probate).
- "Notes of the Quarter (April, May, June, 1901)", Journal of the Royal Asiatic Society of Great Britain and Ireland, July 1901, pp. 619–644.
- "Some Interesting Experiences, Mr. F.O. Lechmere-Oertel", Times of Malta nr 414, 16 December 1936, pp. 9–10, and "Conducting Royalty Round", Times of Malta, 19 December 1936, p. 11.
- "Suitability of Indian Architecture for the New Delhi", The Building News and Engineering Journal, vol. 105, No 3055, 25 July 1913, p. 106.
- "The Fifteenth International Congress of Orientalists at Copenhagen, August 14–20, 1908", The Imperial and Asiatic Quarterly Review and Oriental and Colonial Record, third series, volume XXVI, Nos 51 & 52, July–October 1908, Woking: The Oriental Institute, pp. 335–338.
- The India List and India Office List for 1902, compiled from official records by direction of the secretary of state for India in council, London: Harrison and Sons, 1902. (https://archive.org/stream/indialistandind00offigoog#page/n14/mode/2up) (retrieved on 22 July 2013).
- The India List and India Office List for 1905, compiled from official records by direction of the secretary of state for India in council 1905, London: Harrison and Sons, 1905.
- The R.I.B.A. Kalendar 1888–89, London: The Royal Institute of British Architects, 1888 (http://www.theoriginalrecord.com/ retrieved 23 July 2013).
- "Personalnachrichten", Zeitschrift der Deutschen Morgenländischen Gesellschaft, volume 62, 1908, p. LVI.
- Tour of His Royal Highness The Prince of Wales, India, 1905–1906, Calcutta: Thacker, Spink and Co., n.d.
- Vogel, J.Ph., "Part I. Departmental Notes", Annual Progress Report of the Superintendent of the Archaeological Survey, Northern Circle for the Year ending 31st March 1910, Lahore: Punjab Economical Press, pp. 1–6.

== Works in archives ==
- The Museum of Archaeology and Anthropology of the University of Cambridge lists some 564 photos and 307 objects donated in 1931 by Oertel (http://maa.cam.ac.uk/maa/).
- 88 of Oertel's photographs are kept since 1967 in the British Library archives, London.
- Papers from Margaret Heywood Lechmere-Oertel are kept in the Bodleian Library, Oxford.
