= John Ronald Lidster =

British archaeologist and curator (1916–2008)

- Born: 1916; Hull
- Died: 2008 (aged 91–92); Robin Hood's Bay
- Occupations: Artist, Archaeologist and Curator
- Known for: Rescue excavation of Bronze Age Barrows in Yorkshire and the excavation of the Roman kiln site at Cantley.

John Ronald Lidster (1916–2008) was a British artist, archaeologist and curator based in Yorkshire.

== Biography ==
Lidster was born in Hull in 1916 and moved to Scarborough as a child. During the Second World War he was an artist with the Royal Army Medical College in London. In 1946 he joined the Scarborough and District Archaeological Society where he met William Lamplough. Between 1948 and 1961, Lamplough and Lidster undertook rescue excavations of thirty-seven barrows in the North York Moors; the artefacts from which are now in the Yorkshire Museum. Lidster created detailed paintings of the landscapes in which the barrows are situated. He and William Lamplough also led excavations for the Scarborough and District Archaeological Society in 1951 at the site of King Alfred's Cave (Ebberston, North Yorkshire).

Lidster acted as the first secretary of the recently founded Scarborough Geological Society in the 1950s

In 1950, Lidster worked as a technician and, later, as the Assistant Curator of the Wood End Museum in Scarborough. In 1955 he moved to Doncaster Museum as Assistant Curator. He was later Keeper of the museum, a position he left in 1966–7.

=== Cantley Kilns ===
Whilst working in Doncaster, in 1959, Lidster investigated the Roman kilns site at Cantley. The diagrams produced by Lidster of the Cantley kilns were used in 1962 as the basis for an experimental archaeology project to reconstruct and fire a replica of Cantley Kiln 31.

== Publications ==
- Lamplough, W.H. and Lidster, J. R. 1959. "The Excavation of King Alfrid's Cave, Ebberston", Transactions of the Scarborough Archaeological and Historical Society Vol 55. pp 16–31.
- Lamplough, W. H. and Lidster, J. R. 1960. "The Excavation of the Kirkless Barrow", Transactions of the Scarborough Archaeological and Historical Society (New Series) Vol. 3. pp 29–32.

== See also ==
- North York Moors
- Bronze Age Britain
- History of Yorkshire
- Tumulus
