= William Lamplough =

British teacher and archaeologist

William Hardy Lamplough
- Born: 12 June 1914; Driffield, East Riding of Yorkshire, England
- Died: 17 January 1996 (aged 81); Scarborough, England
- Occupation(s): Teacher and Archaeologist
- Known for: Rescue excavation of Bronze Age Barrows in Yorkshire

William Hardy Lamplough (12 June 1914 – 17 January 1996) was a British teacher and archaeologist based in Yorkshire.

== Biography ==
William Lamplough was born in Driffield, East Riding of Yorkshire in 1914. He graduated from Hull University with a degree in physics. During the Second World War Lamplough was appointed Pilot Officer with the Royal Air Force Volunteer Reserve on 11 July 1939 and finished the war as a Flight Lieutenant. He was a member of the Scarborough and District Archaeological Society, through which he began excavating Bronze Age Barrows in the North York Moors. The society did not continue this work so Lamplough undertook the project personally, with the help of his friend John Ronald Lidster - a fellow archaeologist. Between 1948 and 1961, Lamplough and Lidster excavated thirty-seven such barrows in the North York Moors.

He and Lidster also led excavations for the Scarborough and District Archaeological Society in 1951 at the site of King Alfred's Cave (Ebberston, North Yorkshire).

== North York Moors Barrow Excavations ==
Lamplough and Lidster, along with William's young son David excavated and recorded the remains of the barrows. The finds and site archive were acquired by the Yorkshire Museum in October 2011. Excavated sites included barrows at several sites.

=== Broxa Forest ===
Four barrows excavated in summer 1949 at the Western edge of Broxa Forest.

- Barrow 1 measuring 37 ft in diameter was 3 1/2 ft high and contained two cremations, flint knives and scrapers and a rare bone hook.
- Barrow 2 measuring 36 ft in diameter was 2 1/2 ft high and contained two cremations.
- Barrow 3 measuring 44 ft in diameter was 3 1/2 ft high and contained one surviving cremation, having been part-excavated in the 1880s.
- Broxa 4 measuring 50 ft in diameter was 6 ft high had at least seven cremations associated.

=== Suffield, North Yorkshire|Suffield ===
Several barrows excavated in the 1950s

=== Kirkless ===
Excavated by Lamplough and Lidster with the Scarborough and District Archaeological Society in 1949. Large barrow north of Kirkless farm (near Burniston) 75 ft in diameter and 7 ft in height. No cremation was recovered but finds included a jet block and ceramic fragments.

=== Hackness ===
Several barrows excavated in 1949

== Publications ==
- Lamplough, W. H. and Lidster, J. R. 1959. "The Excavation of King Alfrid's Cave, Ebberston", Transactions of the Scarborough Archaeological and Historical Society Vol 55. pp: 16-31
- Lamplough, W. H. and Lidster, J. R. 1960. "The Excavation of the Kirkless Barrow" Transactions of the Scarborough Archaeological and Historical Society (New Series) Vol. 3. pp: 29–32

== See also ==
- North York Moors
- Bronze Age Britain
- History of Yorkshire
- Tumulus
