= 1905 in archaeology =

Below are notable events in archaeology that occurred in 1905.

== Explorations ==
- August – The Withypool Stone Circle (late Neolithic/early Bronze Age)) on Exmoor, England, is first fully surveyed by Harold St George Gray.
- September – The site of the Roman legionary works depot at Holt, Wales, is identified by fieldwalking.
- Theodore M. Davis officially granted exclusive concession to excavate in the Valley of the Kings in Egypt.

== Excavations ==
- Major project of excavation and restoration at Teotihuacan begun under archeologist Leopoldo Batres.
- First excavations at Deir el-Medina by Ernesto Schiaparelli. Medical Ostraca of Deir el-Medina emerge.
- First scientific survey at Great Zimbabwe begun by David Randall-MacIver.
- George Herbert, 5th Earl of Carnarvon, first excavates in Egypt.

== Publications ==
- G. Baldwin Brown publishes The Care of Ancient Monuments: an account of the legislative and other measures adopted in European countries...
- Francis J. Haverfield publishes "The Romanization of Roman Britain" in Proceedings of the British Academy.
- J. R. Mortimer and Robert Mortimer publish their Forty Years Researches in British and Saxon Burial Mounds of East Yorkshire.
- Thomas Gann publishes first descriptions of Maya site of Lubaantun.

== Finds ==
- Winter 1904–5 – Lion Capital of Asoka, dated to about 250 BCE, discovered at Sarnath by F. O. Oertel.
- Naranjo discovered by Teoberto Maler.
- Caral, the oldest Andean city, discovered.
- Three Roman mosaic pavements are found at Harpham in the East Riding of Yorkshire, England.
- The Newstead Helmet, remains of a Roman cavalry helmet and face mask, is found at Newstead, Scottish Borders.
- Approximate date – Principia of the Roman fort at Bremetennacum (Ribchester), Lancashire, England, discovered by men working for Miss Greenall.

== Events ==
- Arthur Weigall appointed to replace Howard Carter as Chief Inspector of Antiquities for Upper Egypt.

== Births ==
- January 12 – James Bennett Griffin, American archaeologist (died 1997).
- January 26 – Olga Tufnell, English archaeologist of the Near East (died 1985).
- May 11 – Terence Mitford, Japanese-born British archaeologist of the Near East (died 1978).
- October 31 – W. F. Grimes, Welsh archaeologist (died 1988).

== Deaths ==
- March 3 – Antonio Annetto Caruana, Maltese archaeologist (born 1830).
