= 1914 in archaeology =

Below are notable events in archaeology that occurred in 1914.

== Explorations ==
- January - T. E. Lawrence and Leonard Woolley undertake an archaeological survey of the Negev.
- March 29 - Katherine Routledge and her husband William Scoresby Routledge arrive on Easter Island to make the first true study of it (departing August 1915).

== Excavations ==
- Katherine Routledge commences excavation at key Easter Island sites including Rano Raraku and Orongo.
- George Herbert, 5th Earl of Carnarvon, and Howard Carter first excavate in the Valley of the Kings, Egypt.
- Hiram Bingham III resumes excavations around Machu Picchu in Peru.
- Excavations begin at Traprain Law in Scotland.
- Tinkinswood Neolithic megalithic chamber tomb in South Wales excavated.
- Warham Camp Iron Age circular hill fort in Norfolk, England first excavated.

== Finds ==
- c. February 10 - "Treasure of El Lahun" in Tomb 8 of Sithathoriunet in Egypt.
- February - Bonn–Oberkassel dog skeletal remains discovered in context with human bones in Germany; only in the 1970s is it identified as an early (c. 14,000 BP) specimen of a domestic dog.

== Publications ==
- John L. Myres - Handbook of the Cesnola Collection of Antiquities from Cyprus (Metropolitan Museum of Art, New York).
- Thomas A. Joyce - Mexican Archaeology: an introduction to the archaeology of the Mexican and Mayan civilizations of pre-Spanish America.
- Egypt Exploration Fund begins publishing The Journal of Egyptian Archaeology.

== Honours ==
- John Marshall knighted.

== Births ==
- April 23 - Glyn Daniel, Welsh-born archaeologist (d. 1986).
- June 12 - William Lamplough, British archaeologist (d. 1996).
- June 14 - Rupert Bruce-Mitford, British archaeologist (d. 1994).
- June 5 - Beatrice De Cardi, British archaeologist of Asia (d. 2016).

== Deaths ==
- March 18 - Adolph Francis Alphonse Bandelier, American archaeologist (b. 1840).
- May 18 - Edward R. Ayrton, English Egyptologist and archaeologist (b. 1882).
