= Sakçagözü =

Village in Gaziantep Province, Turkey

- Neighbourhood
- Location within Turkey
- Coordinates: 37°10′25″N 36°55′41″E
- Country: Turkey
- Province: Gaziantep
- District: Nurdağı
- Population (2022): 3,920
- Time zone: UTC+3 (TRT)

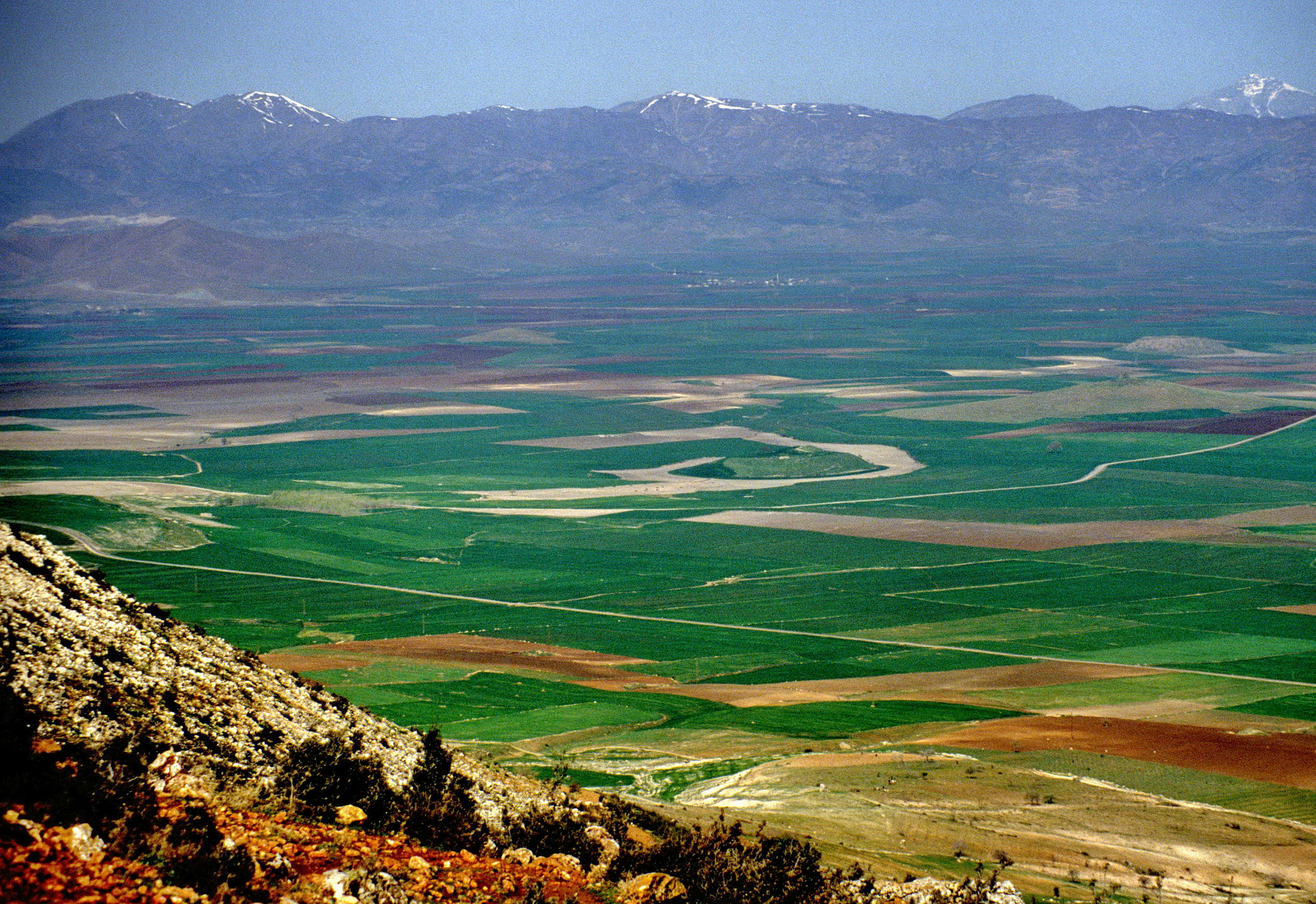
Salçagözü in April 1992

Sakçagözü, also known as Keferdiz, is a neighbourhood of the municipality and district of Nurdağı, Gaziantep Province, Turkey. Its population is 3,920 (2022). Before the 2013 reorganisation, it was a town (belde). The village is populated by Alevi Turkmens.
