= 1915 in archaeology =

Below are notable events in archaeology that occurred in 1915.

== Explorations ==
- Hiram Bingham III finishes his explorations of Machu Picchu, begun in 1911.

== Excavations ==
- R. E. Merwin leads Harvard University's Peabody Museum of Archaeology and Ethnology project at Lubaantun.
- Alfred V. Kidder (director of the Southwestern Expedition for Phillips Andover Academy) excavates Pecos Pueblo, New Mexico (ending 1927).
- Earl Halstead Morris excavates Twin Angels Pueblo.
- Nijmegen Helmet is found in the Netherlands.

== Publications ==
- Sylvanus Morley - An Introduction to the Study of Maya Hieroglyphs.

== Events ==
- 21 September - Cecil Chubb acquires Stonehenge at auction for £6600.
- The first of the 'Etruscan terracotta warriors', forged by sculptor Alfredo Fioravanti with the Riccardi family, is purchased by the Metropolitan Museum of Art in New York City.

== Births ==
- August 8 - María Rostworowski, Peruvian historian (died 2016).
- December 8 - Bernard Fagg, English archaeologist working in Nigeria (died 1987).
- December 28 - Martyn Jope, British archaeologist and biochemist (died 1996).
- Michael J. O'Kelly, Irish archaeologist (died 1982).

== Deaths ==
- February 23 - Theodore M. Davis, American Egyptological excavation sponsor (born 1837).
- May 10 - Gaston Cros, French army officer and archaeologist, killed in action (born 1861).
- October 24 - Désiré Charnay, French archaeologist of Central America (born 1828).
- Sir Alfred Biliotti, Italian Levantine British consular officer and archaeologist (born 1833)
