= Don Crabtree =

American archaeologist

Don E. Crabtree (June 8, 1912 – November 16, 1980) was an American flintknapper and pioneering experimental archaeologist.

He was mostly self-educated, however he was awarded an honorary doctorate degree by the University of Idaho. His 1972 publication An Introduction to Flintworking still serves as one of the primary terminology sources for students of lithic technology. Crabtree is known for "Crabtree's Law", which states that "the greater the degree of final finishing applied to a stone artifact, whether by flaking, grinding, and/or polishing, the harder it is to conclude the lithic reduction process which produced the stone artifact". Through practical experimentation and study of archaeological finds (both completed tools and the chips of stone left by their production) Crabtree learned to produce replicas of a variety of different ancient flint and obsidian blades.

== Life and death ==
Don E. Crabtree was born in Heyburn, Idaho, on June 8, 1912. He finished high school in Twin Falls in 1930, after which he worked for the Idaho Power Company, met his wife Evelyn and married in 1943 while working for the Bethlehem Steel Company in California. Crabtree would spend the next 30 years educating and assisting some of the biggest names in archeology at the time such as Alfred Kroeber. Crabtree was also asked for his advice at influential sites like the Clovis type site. After a highly successful career he died in Twin Falls, Idaho on November 16, 1980 of complications due to heart disease.

== Employment history ==
After graduation from high school Don Crabtree first worked for the Idaho Power Company. After dropping out of Long Beach Junior College in California he began working in paleontological laboratories. By the late 1930s he was the preparator in the vertebrate paleontology laboratory at the University of California, Berkeley. It was during this time he became acquainted with Alfred L. Kroeber and E. W. Gifford of the Lowie Museum at Berkeley. His time at Berkeley also included conducting flint knapping demonstrations for scholars and students and occasionally for museum visitors. After his battle with cancer was over in 1941 he worked for several months at the Lithic Laboratory of the Ohio Historical Society. It was during this period that Crabtree was called upon as an advisor in lithic studies to the University of Pennsylvania, where he was associated with Edgar B. Howard and the Clovis point type site at Black Water Draw. Frank H. H. Roberts of the Smithsonian Institution also called upon him around this time to consult on the analysis of the Lindenmeier Folsom point collection. When the U.S. entered into World War II the Lithic lab was discontinued and Crabtree returned to California to assist in the war effort as a coordination engineer for Bethlehem Steel Company, which built the ships for the Pacific effort until the war ended. After WWII he returned to Twin Springs, Idaho and became a successful real estate salesman in the postwar market. Crabtree was employed from 1952 until 1962 as a county supervisor for the U.S. Department of Agriculture's Agricultural Stabilization and Conservation Service (ASCS) in Twin Falls. In March 1962 he opened the First Conference of Western Archaeologists on Problems of Point Typology at the Idaho State College Museum with a demonstration of his flintworking skills. In 1964 he was appointed Research Associate in Lithic Technology at the Pocatello Museum - a job he maintained until 1975.

== Awards and honors ==
Don Crabtree was awarded an honorary doctorate degree from the University of Idaho for his outstanding contributions to the field of experimental archeology. As a rule he was apprehensive to speak at lectures and publish his work therefore the majority of the archeological community did not realize the depth of his contributions until most of his papers were published in the Idaho State University Museum journal, Tebiwa. After this he became a household name in the U.S. and the "Crabtree School" of Flintknapping was begun during which he taught some 33 pupils from 1969 to 1975 many of which would produce dissertations that would educate students across the country in lithic technology. In 1969 some of Crabtree's work was featured in a special exhibition at New York's American Museum of Natural History. He is also credited with the creation of "Crabtree's Law" which is integral in the modern study of lithics. Don Crabtree donated his entire collection of work to the University of Idaho for current and future archeologists to study. The Crabtree Award of the Society for American Archaeology is also named after him.

== Selected papers ==
- Mastodon Bone with Artifacts in California. 1939. American Antiquity 5(2):148-149. Mastodon Bone with Artifacts in California
- Crabtree, Don E; Butler, Robert B (May 4, 1964). "Notes on experiments in flint knapping. 1. Heat treatment of silica materials". Tebiwa. 7 (1).
- Crabtree, Don E (May 4, 1967). "Notes on experiments in flintknapping. 3. The flintknapper's raw material". Tebiwa. 10 (1).
- Crabtree, Don E (May 4, 1967). "Notes on experiments in flintknapping. 4. Tools used for making flaked stone artifacts". Tebiwa. 10 (1).
- Archaeological Evidence of Acculturation Along the Oregon Trail. 1968. Tebiwa 11(2):38-42.
- A Technological Description of Artifacts in Assemblage I, Wilson Butte Cave, Idaho. 1969. Current Anthropology (10)4:366-367.
- Unusual Milling Stone from Battle Mountain, Nevada. 1974. Tebiwa 17(1):89-91.
- Crabtree, Don E (May 4, 1975). "Comments on lithic technology and experimental archaeology". tdar.org. 9, 12. Mouton: 105–114.
- Crabtree, Don E (May 4, 1972). "The cone fracture principle and the manufacture of lithic materials". Tebiwa. 15 (2).
- Crabtree, Don E; Bordes, François (May 4, 1969). "The Corbiac blade technique and other experiments". Tebiwa. 12 (2).
- Crabtree, Don E; Bordes, F (May 4, 1969). "The Corbiac blade technique and other experiments". Tebiwa. 12 (2).
- Crabtree, Don E; jr, E H Swanson (May 4, 1968). "Edge-ground cobbles and blade-making in the Northwest". Tebiwa. 11 (2).
- Crabtree, Don E; Davis, E L (May 4, 1968). "Experimental manufacture of wooden implements with tools of flaked stone". Science. 159 (3813): 426–428. Bibcode:1968Sci...159..426C. doi:10.1126/science.159.3813.426. PMID 17769676. S2CID 19587639.
- Crabtree, Don E (May 4, 1973). "Experiments in replicating Hohokam points". Tebiwa. 16 (1).
- Crabtree, Don E (May 4, 1970). "Flaking stone tools with wooden implements". Science. 169 (394).
- Crabtree, Don E (May 4, 1973). "The flintknapper's raw materials". tdar.org. EXARC Experimental Archaeology Collection Manager: 230–234.
- Crabtree, Don E (May 4, 1974). "Grinding and smoothing of stone artefacts". Tebiwa. 17 (1).
- Crabtree, Don E (May 4, 1982). "An Introduction to Flint working". tdar.org. Occasional Papers of the Idaho Museum of Natural History. 28. EXARC Experimental Archaeology Collection Manager.
- Crabtree, Don E (May 4, 1972). "An introduction to flintworking. Part 1. An introduction to the technology of stone tools". tdar.org. Occasional Papers of the Idaho State University Museum. 28.
- Crabtree, Don E; Gould, Richard A (May 4, 1970). "Man's oldest craft recreated". Curator. 13 (3): 179–198. doi:10.1111/j.2151-6952.1970.tb00402.x.
- Crabtree, Don E (May 4, 1968). "Mesoamerican polyhedral cores and prismatic blades". American Antiquity. 33 (4): 446–478. doi:10.2307/278596. JSTOR 278596. S2CID 162368989.
- Crabtree, Don E (May 4, 1977). "The obtuse angle as a functional edge". tdar.org. Columbia University Press: 38–51.
- Crabtree, Don E (May 4, 1966). "A stoneworker's approach to analyzing and replicating the Lindenmeier Folsom". Tebiwa. 9 (1).
- Knudson R. Don E. Crabtree, 1912–1980. American Antiquity. 1982;47(2):336-343. doi:10.1017/S0002731600061229.
