= Mitla =

Archeological site in the state of Oaxaca in Mexico

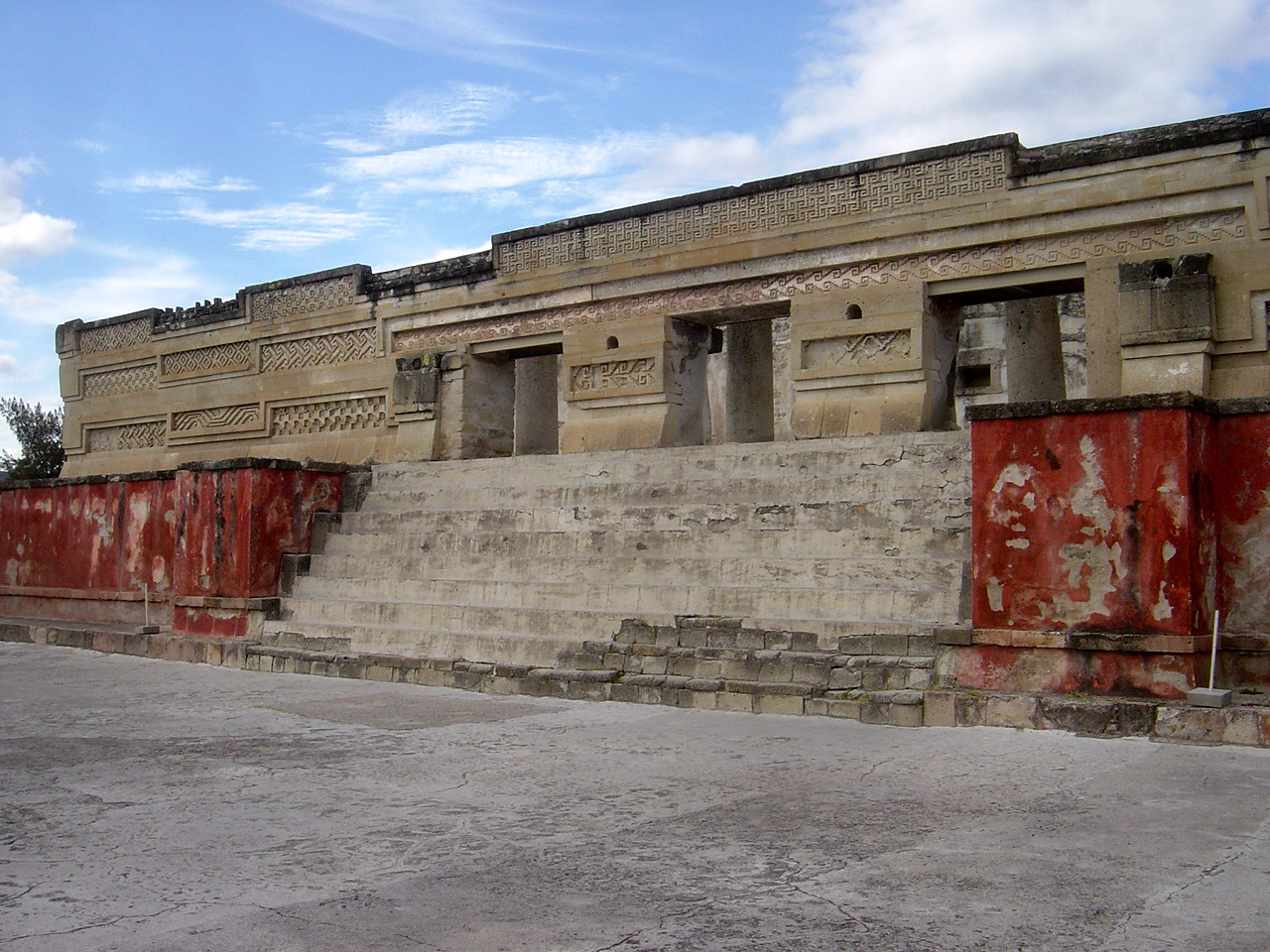
- Palace at Mitla

- Location within Mesoamerica
- 16°55′38″N 96°21′34″W
- Periods: Early Classic to Late Postclassic
- Cultures: Zapotec
- Location: San Pablo Villa de Mitla, Oaxaca, Mexico
- Region: Oaxaca Valley

History
- Abandoned: 1521

Mitla is the second-most important archeological site in the state of Oaxaca in Mexico, after Monte Albán, and the most important of the Zapotec culture. The site is located 44 km from the city of Oaxaca, in the upper end of the Tlacolula Valley, one of the three cold, high valleys that form the Central Valleys Region of the state. At an elevation of 4,855 ft (1,480 m), surrounded by the mountains of the Sierra Madre del Sur, the archeological site is within the modern municipality of San Pablo Villa de Mitla. It is 24 mi (38 km) southeast of Oaxaca city. While Monte Albán was the most important politically of the Zapotec centers, Mitla became the main religious one in a later period as the area became dominated by the Mixtec.

The name Mitla is derived from the Nahuatl name Mictlán, meaning the "place of the dead" or "underworld." Its Zapotec name is Lyobaa, which means “place of rest”. The name Mictlán was transliterated to Mitla. It was established as a sacred burial site by the Zapotec, but the architecture and designs also show the influence of the Mixtec, who had become prominent in the area during the peak of Mitla settlement.

Mitla is unique among Mesoamerican sites because of its elaborate and intricate mosaic fretwork and geometric designs that cover tombs, panels, friezes, and even entire walls of the complex. These mosaics are made with small, finely cut and polished stone pieces that have been fitted together without the use of mortar. No other site in Mexico has this decorative work.

== History of the site ==
Mitla is one of many well-preserved archeological sites in the Oaxaca Valley, where the cold, dry climate has conserved sites as old as 10,000 years. This valley was settled by the Zapotec before the turn of the first millennium, who over the centuries developed a hierarchical society governed by elites. While the valley was relatively isolated, the Zapotec did have contacts with other Mesoamerican peoples. This has been demonstrated by cultural, pottery and other influences that flowed back and forth between other peoples.

By the time the Spanish arrived in the 16th century, the Mixtec had migrated into the area. The mixed Zapotec state had a population of more than 500,000. They had developed and used sophisticated construction techniques, a writing system, two calendar systems, and sophisticated systems of agricultural cultivation. Their basic crops were maize, beans, squash, and chili peppers. These were dependent on their constructed irrigation systems and the use of terraces on mountain slopes in order to grow food for the mostly urban population.

Mitla was inhabited at least since the Classic Period (100-650 CE) and perhaps from as early as 900 BCE. It began as a fortified village on the outer edge of the valley and later became the main religious center of the Zapotec. The Mixtec took control of the area around 1000 CE, although the area remained populated by many Zapotec. The city reached its height and largest size between 750 and 1521, with both Zapotec and Mixtec influences in its architecture during that time.

Mitla is one of the pre-Columbian sites that express the Mesoamerican belief that death was the most consequential part of life after birth. It was built as a gateway between the world of the living and the world of the dead. Nobles buried at Mitla were believed to be destined to become “cloud people,” who would intercede on behalf of the population below.

Mitla was still occupied and functioning as the main religious center when the Spanish explorers and military expeditions arrived in the 1520s and later. The high priest, called the Uija-tào, resided at Mitla. At that time the urban center covered an area of 1 to 2 square kilometres (0.39 to 0.77 sq mi), with suburban areas surrounding it. In the rural areas, intensive agriculture was practiced over an area of more than 20 square kilometres (7.7 sq mi) to feed the city.

During the early colonial period, some descriptions of the site were by the Spanish invaders and missionaries who first arrived in the valley. Friar Toribio de Benavente Motolina wrote about the city in the mid-16th century, and was one of the first to do so. He said that its name meant “hell,” his interpretation of the underworld. Another early writer was Diego García de Palacio, a Spanish nautical engineer working in Mexico and Guatemala, whose account was dated in 1576.

In 1553 Oaxacan Archbishop Albuquerque ordered the destruction of the Mitlan site. As the site had long held great political and religious significance for the area, he wanted to dissolve its power. Spanish-directed forces attacked the buildings, dismantling and sacking them, with few buildings spared. Later, Spanish clergy lived in some of the rooms of the sacred site, to displace the Zapotec who had been there before.

The stone blocks and remains were used as building materials for Spanish churches, including the Church of San Pablo, which was constructed on top of part of the ruins. The north side of the Cathedral of Oaxaca incorporates design features from Mitla to symbolize that the old culture was superseded by the new religious order.

In the state of Oaxaca, Mitla is second in importance as an archeological site only to Monte Albán, the central city. At the beginning of the 20th century, the government of Porfirio Díaz chose Mitla as one of the emblematic symbols of pre-Hispanic Mexico for the Centennial celebrations of Mexico’s Independence. Alfonso Caso, the archaeologist who excavated Monte Albán in 1931, also did work at Mitla in the 1920s and 1930s.

Since the 1980s, Mitla has been the site of further excavations, with important work conducted on the North Group. The colonial church was excavated around the start of the 21st century. For Mexico's bicentennial celebrations in 2010, INAH has been intensifying efforts to conserve the ancient ruins.

In 2023, the Association for Archaeological Research and Exploration released a review of the previous year of research at the site that is exploring subterranean aspects of the site.

== Description of site ==
Rather than being a group of pyramids on a ridge, as is Monte Albán, Mitla is a group of structures built on the valley floor. These valleys are at high elevations (more than 1370 m (4500 ft) high). The site does not have the far and wide vistas of Monte Albán. The architecture is characterized as more for the comfort of the residents rather than for magnificence. The construction of Mitla as a ceremonial center began in 850CE. The city was fully developed when the Spaniards arrived and brutally destroyed it due to religious zeal in the mid-16th century.

The oldest group of buildings has been dated to between 450 and 700 CE and shows architectural features similar to those found at the earlier Monte Albán. Mitla is one of the few sites that was started in the Classic period, when the Mixtec became dominant in the area. The site represents the most developed architecture of the Zapotec; it is the product of the syncretism of Mixtec and Zapotec design features, which reached its height in 1200. Another syncretism was later expressed by the Catholic churches using Zapotec design features as they built over the foundations by destroying indigenous temples in this area, such as the San Pedro Church, located in the North Group, and the Calvario Chapel, located in the Adobe Group.

The construction of the stone walls appears to have had similar techniques for all groups: a core of mud and stone covered with plaster or well-cut trachyte rock. Some of the large stones, such as those used as columns and lintels, weigh as much as 18 tons. Construction on the site, and acquisition and transportation of such materials, required the complex coordination of large groups of workers.

Today the archeological site consists of five groups of buildings, with a fence of cactus plants surrounding much of it. The five groups are called the South, the Adobe, the Arroyo, the Columns or Palace, and the Church or North Group. All of the groups’ buildings are aligned with the cardinal directions. The South Group and the Adobe Group have been classified as ceremonial centers, featuring central plazas surrounded by mound structures. The South, Columns and Church groups have been classified as palaces, with rooms surrounding square courtyards. The two best preserved groups are the Columns Group and the Church Group, both at the north end of the site.

The Columns Group and the Church Group were both fully excavated and restored by the early 1980s and are open to the public. Both consist of rectangular courtyards surrounded by one-story rectangular buildings, with long, narrow rooms.

=== Church Group ===
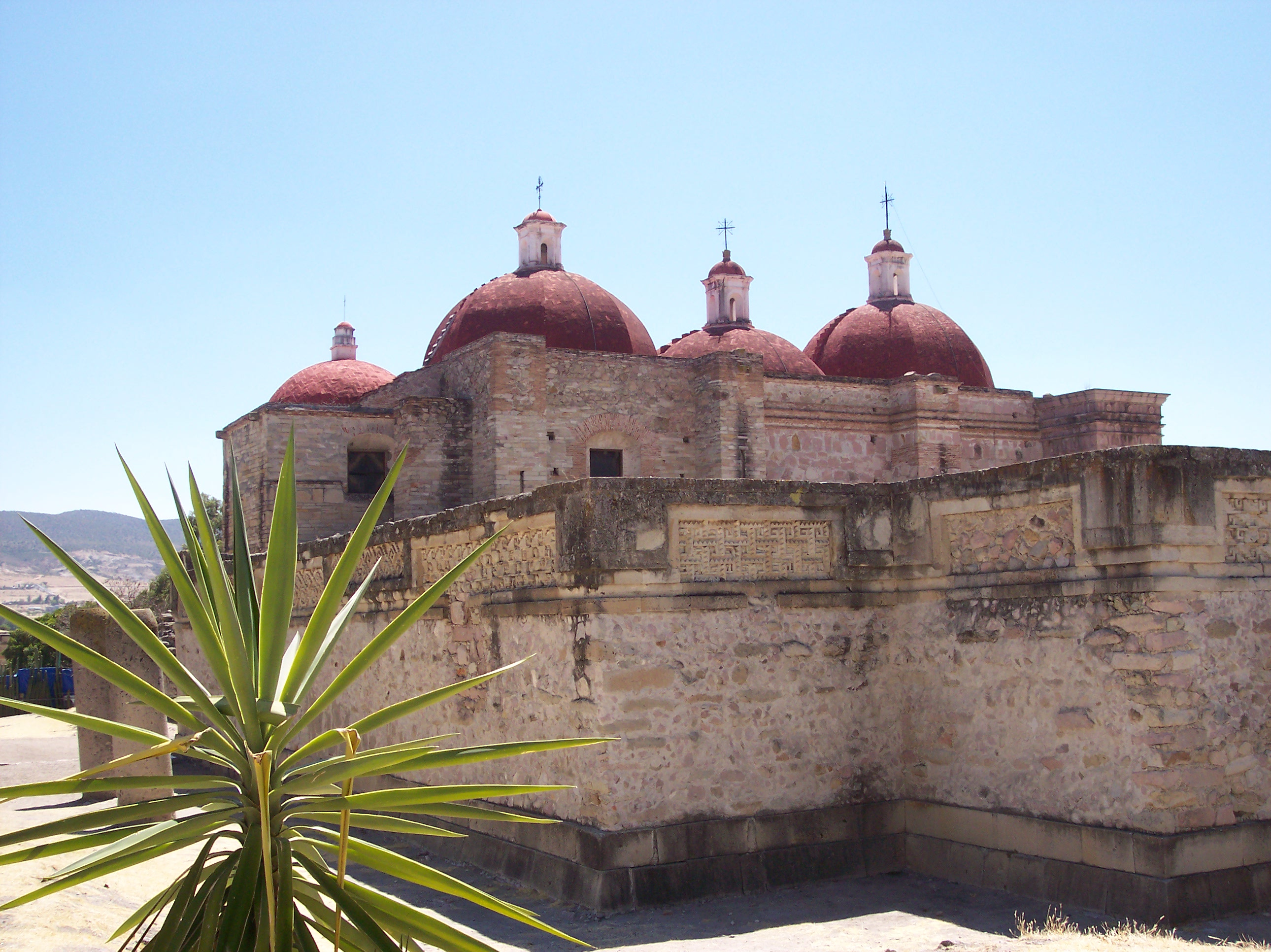
Church of San Pablo

The entrance to the site is by the Church or North Group. In the 16th century, the Spanish built the Church of San Pablo here, on top of a large pre-Hispanic platform, which now serves as the church atrium. The Zapotec believed that the lord and lady of the underworld lived in this group of structures. The Spaniards built their church here to emphasize their power and to keep the “devil” from escaping.

The group also contains the main Zapotec temple, called the yohopàe, which translates to “house of the vital force.” This temple faces a large courtyard. The portal to the temple is flanked by two large columns, which lead into an antechamber. This antechamber once had a roof, supported by six columns, but only the columns and walls remain. Beyond the antechamber is the main room, where priests burned incense, made sacrifices and performed other rites. Behind the main chamber are the living quarters of the Zapotec priests. Walls throughout this building are covered by intricate mosaic fretwork, and murals depicting mythological scenes and characters.

There are lithic tombs, shaped as a cruciform or cross, under some of the buildings. They are reached by stairs that descend from the patio area. Inside they are decorated with mosaics. One of the tombs has an entrance that is divided by a thick column. This column is popularly known as the "Columna de la Vida" (Column of Life). According to legend, if a person wraps their arms around the column, the space remaining between the hands indicates the amount of life the individual has left.

=== Columns Group ===
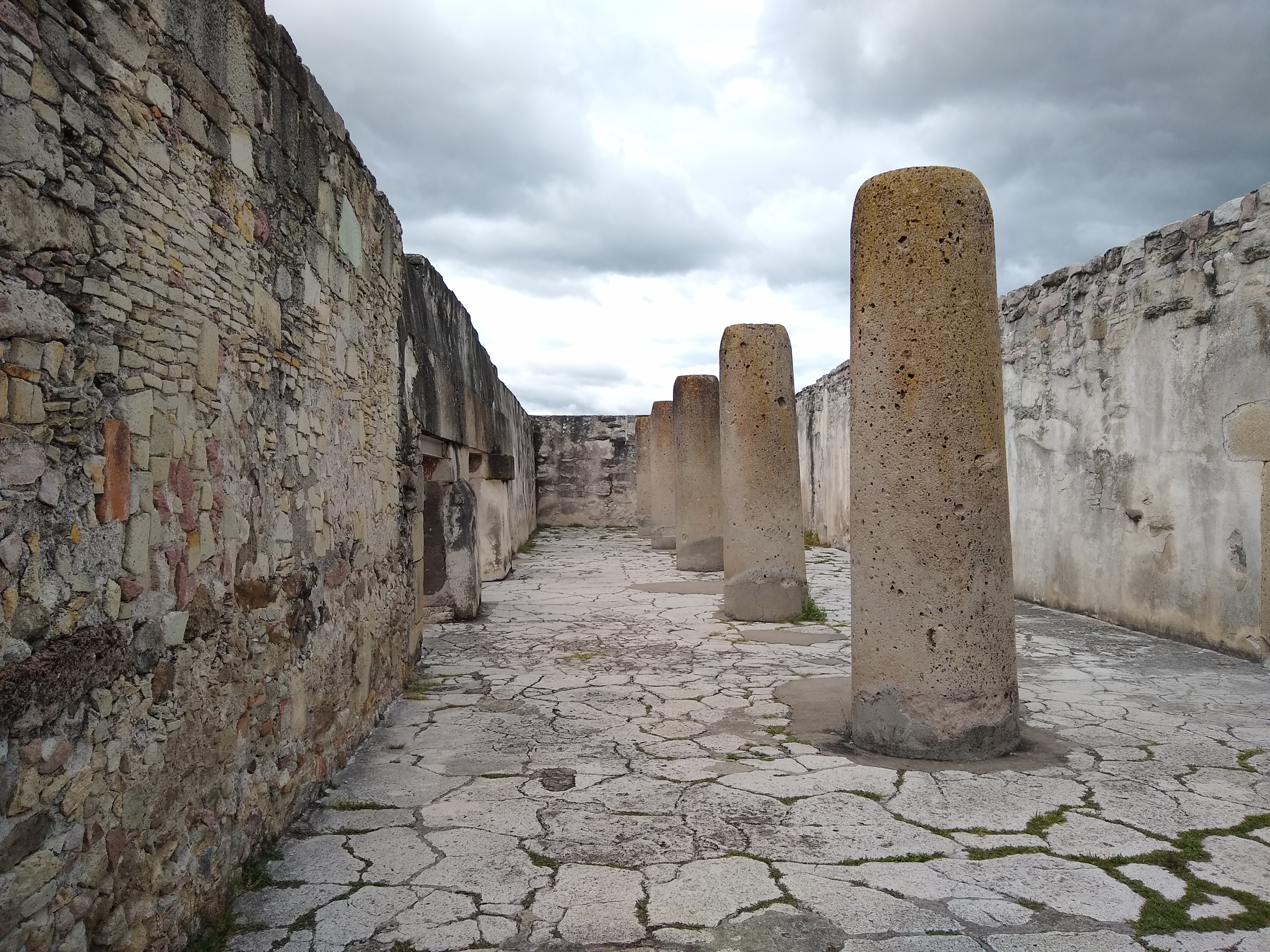
Palace column room

To the south of the Church Group is the Columns Group, whose main building is called the Palace. This group has two entrances to the outside, which face south. The entrance room contains immense columns which support the roof. The north wall has a small opening facing the patio, believed to be used to pass into the afterlife.

The main building is called the Palace or the Grand Hall of Columns. It measures 120 by 21 feet (36.6 by 6.4 m) and has six columns of volcanic stone that once supported the roof. After passing through a small corridor, access is gained to the courtyard, which is intricately decorated in mosaic fretwork and geometric designs. The north and east buildings of the group have elaborate tombs where high priests and Zapotec rulers were buried. In front of the stairs of the north building is a cross-shaped tomb with an antechamber. The ceiling has large beams made of stone, and the walls are decorated with tablets and stone fretwork. The east building is characterized by a monolithic stone column that supports the roof.

=== Friezes ===
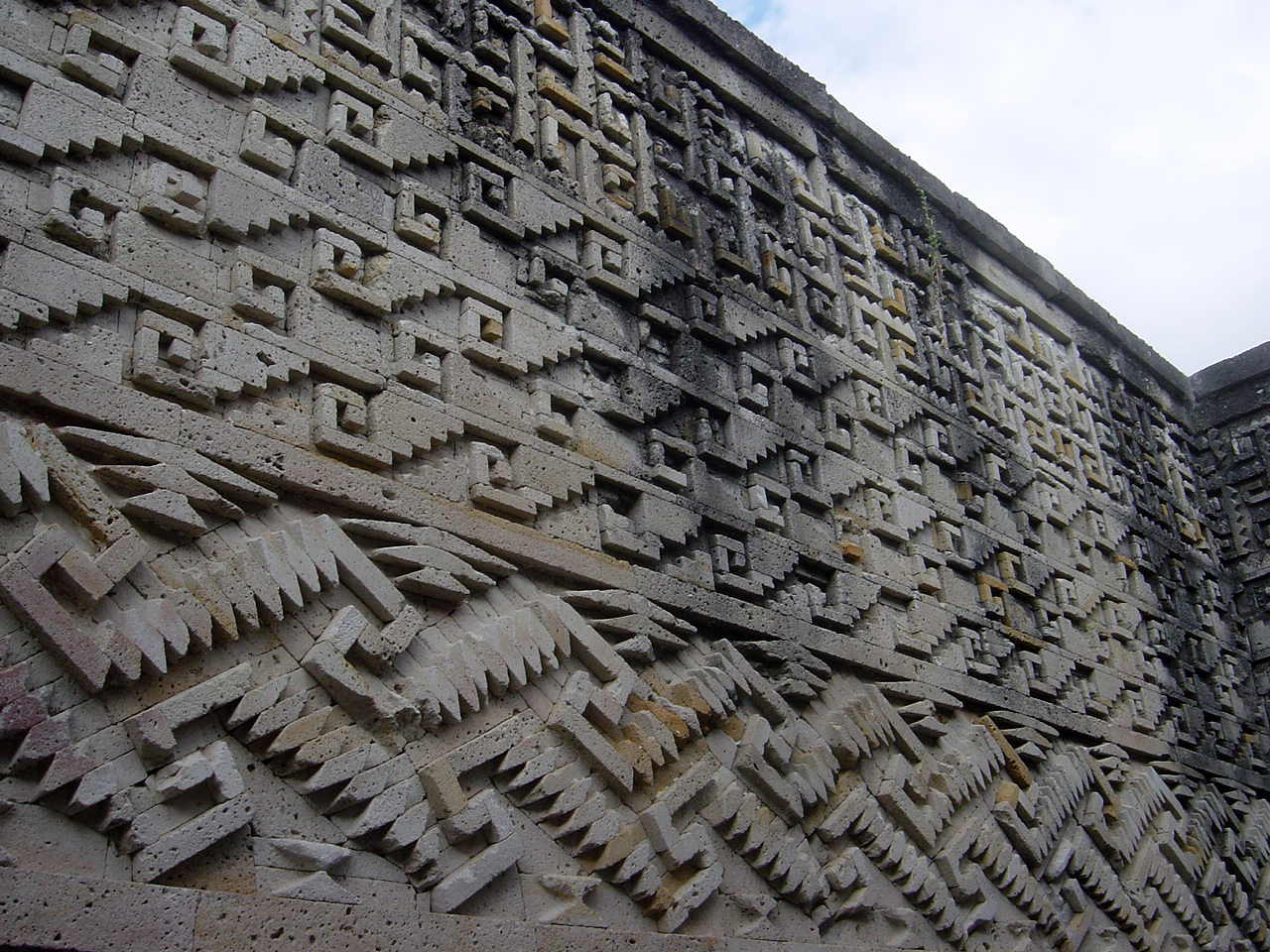
Close up of some of the fretwork

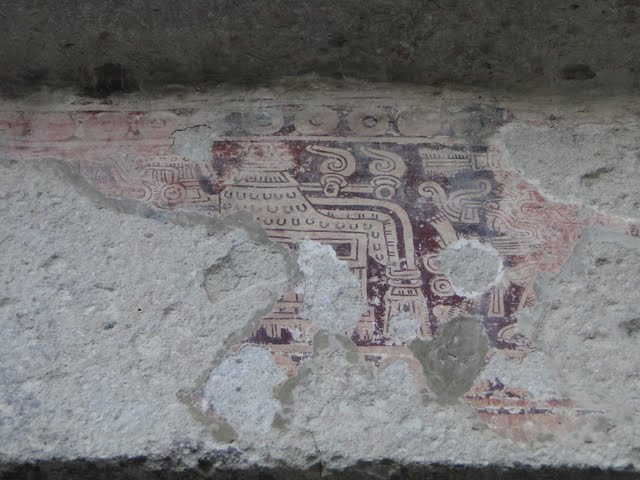
Ancient frescos in Mitla

The main distinguishing feature of Mitla is the intricate mosaic fretwork and geometric designs that profusely adorn the walls of both the Church and Columns groups. The geometric patterns, called grecas in Spanish, are made from thousands of cut, polished stones that are fitted together without mortar. The pieces were set against a stucco background painted red. The stones are held in place by the weight of the stones that surround them. Walls, friezes and tombs are decorated with mosaic fretwork. In some cases, such as in lintels, these stone “tiles” are embedded directly into the stone beam. The elaborate mosaics are considered to be a type of “Baroque” design, as the designs are elaborate and intricate, and in some cases cover entire walls. None of the fretwork designs is repeated exactly anywhere in the complex. The fretwork here is unique in all of Mesoamerica.

== Conservation of the site ==
The two main concerns for the Mitla site are the eroding effects of wind, rain etc. and graffiti. The latter, which is mostly painted or etched by visitors, has been a serious problem at least since the early 20th century. To protect the ruins, especially the grecas, shelters have been constructed over a number of the rooms of the Palace or Columns Group. These shelters are palm-thatched roofs supported by wooden beams and columns. They are intended to resemble roofs that were common in the Mesoamerican period. Reconstruction projects planned or underway include, rebuilding the 17th-century wall of a room used as a priests’ residence in the Church Group, laying stucco floors in the Columns Group, sealing of platforms and fortifications walls, and landscaping and the restoration of a colonial-era rainwater collection tank. The last was the only one of its kind built in the valley during the colonial period.

Mitla is one of the sites to be included in a planned program called the Archeology Corridor of Oaxaca Valley (Corredor Arqueológico del Valle de Oaxaca). The government's goals are to maintain and restore ruins, as well as to make the site more accessible for visitors. In addition, archeologists such as Nelly Robles have supported efforts to gain recognition of the site, especially as a UNESCO World Heritage Site, because of its importance. It is already listed on Mexico’s list of national heritage sites, called the Lista Indicativa del Patromonio Nacional. The Mitla ruins are listed along with the Tree of Tule in the region, and nearby caves that have ancient paintings and show evidence of human habitation for 8,000 years.

== Tourism ==
Mitla is the second most visited archeological site in the state of Oaxaca, after Monte Albán. The Mitla site is very important to the modern town of San Pablo Villa de Mitla, as tourist-related activities support most of the economy. Many residents feel that neither the site or the town is promoted sufficiently by the government. Authorities who administer the site say that tourism is rising. Most visitors are Mexicans who visit on weekends from Veracruz and Puebla states. Foreign visitors are mostly European. On average 500 people per day visit the site.

== See also ==
- Guilá Naquitz cave
