= Ernest Hamy =

French anthropologist and ethnologist

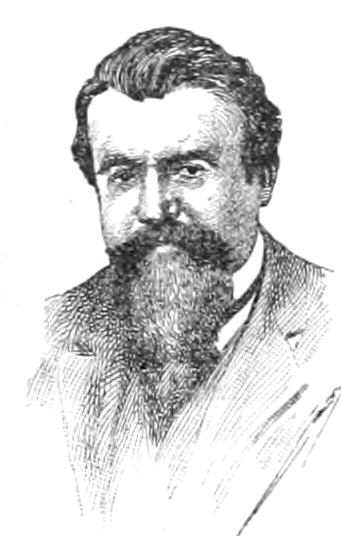
- Born: 22 June 1842; Boulogne-sur-Mer, France
- Died: 18 November 1908 (aged 66); Paris, France
- Scientific career
- Fields: Anthropology, ethnology
- Thesis: Étude sur la figure des corps célestes (1887)

Ernest-Théodore Hamy (22 June 1842, Boulogne-sur-Mer – 18 November 1908, Paris) was a French anthropologist and ethnologist.

He studied medicine in Paris, earning his doctorate in 1868. Afterwards, he served as a préparateur under Paul Broca in the laboratory of anthropology at the Ecole pratique des hautes études. In 1872 he became an assistant naturalist at the Muséum national d'histoire naturelle, where he worked closely with Armand de Quatrefages. He was elected an International Member of the American Philosophical Society in 1891. In 1892 he was appointed professor of anthropology at the Museum.

He was founder and curator of the Musée d'Ethnographie du Trocadéro as well as creator of the Revue d’ethnographie. He was vice-president (1886) and president (1895) of the Société des traditions populaires, and a founding member of the Société des américanistes (1892). Also, he was a member of the Société d’Anthropologie de Paris and the Société de géographie.

== Selected works ==
- Précis de paléontologie humaine (1870).
- Les Origines du musée d'ethnographie (1890).
