= 1900 in archaeology =

Below are notable events in archaeology that occurred in 1900.

== Events ==
- September 9 – The François Vase is smashed into 638 pieces by a museum guard.

== Excavations ==
- March 16 – Arthur Evans purchases Knossos on Crete and soon after begins excavations.
- Excavations by Friedrich Delitzsch begin at Assur.
- University of Pennsylvania excavations at Nippur conclude (began in 1888).
- Gordium excavated by Gustav and Alfred Körte.
- Kavousi excavated by Harriet Boyd.
- Villa Boscoreale, near Pompeii, excavated.
- Excavations at Hedeby in Jutland begin.

== Finds ==
- April 5 – A large cache of clay tablets with a script used for writing Mycenaean Greek, which becomes known as Linear B, is found at Knossos.
- May – Migdale Hoard of early Bronze Age jewellery discovered near Bonar Bridge in Scotland.
- October – Greek sponge divers discover the Antikythera wreck.
- Dr. James K. Hampson documents find of the Island 35 Mastodon skeleton in the Mississippi River.
- Site of Temple of Eshmun discovered in Lebanon.

== Births ==
- May 2 – A. W. Lawrence, English Classical archaeologist (d. 1991).
- May 23 – Gustav Riek, German archaeologist (d. 1976).
- August 18 – Glenn Albert Black, American archaeologist (d. 1964).
- August 19 – Dorothy Burr Thompson, American archaeologist and art historian (d. 2001).

== Deaths ==
- May 4 – Augustus Pitt Rivers, English ethnologist and archaeologist (b. 1827).
- May 18 – Félix Ravaisson-Mollien, French philosopher and archaeologist (b. 1813).

== See also ==
- List of years in archaeology
- 1899 in archaeology
- 1901 in archaeology
