= 1912 in archaeology =

Below are notable events in archaeology that occurred in 1912.

== Excavations ==
- Project to excavate and restore ancient temples at Sanchi begins under Sir John Marshall (continues to 1919).
- Excavations at Viroconium (Wroxeter) in England begin (continue to 1914).
- Excavations at Uruk by Deutsche Orient-Gesellschaft begin (continue to 1913).
- Excavations at St. Mary's Abbey, York, in northern England by Walter Harvey-Brook.
- Excavations at Yewden Roman villa, Hambleden in south central England by Alfred Heneage Cocks, discovering 97 perinatal skeletons.

== Finds ==
- June - Cheapside Hoard of early 17th century jewellery from the City of London.
- June 23 - Jaw of "Piltdown Man" "found" by Charles Dawson in Sussex, England (shown to be a hoax in 1953).
- December 6 - Bust of Nefertiti from Tell el-Amarna, Egypt by a German archeological team.

== Publications ==
- Aleš Hrdlička - Early Man in South America.

== Births ==
- January 8: Sigurður Þórarinsson, Icelandic pioneer of tephrochronology (d. 1983)
- June 8: Don Crabtree, American experimental archaeologist (d. 1980)
- August 5: Margaret Guido, born Cecily Margaret Preston, English archaeologist (d. 1994)
- Taha Baqir, Iraqi archaeologist and Assyriologist (d. 1984)
- Elisabeth Schmid, German archaeologist and osteologist (d. 1994)
