= 1913 in archaeology =

Below are notable events in archaeology that occurred in 1913.

== Excavations ==
- Excavations at Shechem by a German team begin.
- Excavations at Etemenanki by Robert Koldewey begin.
- Excavations at City of David, Jerusalem, by Raymond Weill begin.

== Publications ==
- April National Geographic Magazine is entirely devoted to the discoveries of Hiram Bingham III at Machu Picchu.
- E. Thurlow Leeds - The Archaeology of the Anglo-Saxon Settlements.

== Finds ==
- Remains of the 14th century David's Tower at Edinburgh Castle, Scotland, are discovered.
- The Theodotos inscription is discovered in the City of David. Dating to the 1st century BCE/CE, it remains the earliest archaeological evidence for a synagogue in Jerusalem.

== Events ==
- The Neolithic site at Skara Brae on Mainland, Orkney (Scotland) is plundered.

== Births ==
- February 6 - Mary Leakey, English paleoanthropologist working in Africa (d. 1996).
- March 7 - Gordon Willey, American archaeologist working in the Americas (d. 2002).
- November 12 - Kenneth Steer, British archaeologist and British Army officer (d. 2007).

== Deaths ==
- April 19 - Hugo Winckler, German Assyriologist (b. 1863).
- May 28 - John Lubbock, 1st Baron Avebury, English prehistorian (b. 1834).
