= 1901 in science =

The year 1901 in science and technology involved some significant events, listed below.

== Biology ==
- Okapi, a relative of the Giraffe found in the rainforests around the Congo River in north east Zaire, is discovered (previously known only to local natives).
- Publication of Robert Ridgway's The Birds of North and Middle America by the Smithsonian Institution begins.
- Edmund Selous publishes the book Bird Watching in the U.K., giving rise to the term birdwatching.

== Chemistry ==
- May 27 – The Edison Storage Battery Company is founded in New Jersey.
- June 17 – Europium is discovered by Eugène-Anatole Demarçay.
- Emil Fischer, in collaboration with Ernest Fourneau, synthesizes the dipeptide, glycylglycine, and also publishes his work on the hydrolysis of casein.
- Edith Humphrey becomes (probably) the first British woman to obtain a doctorate in chemistry, at the University of Zurich.

== Computing ==
- December 13 (20:45:52) – Retrospectively, this becomes the earliest date representable with a signed 32-bit integer on digital computer systems that reference time in seconds since the Unix epoch.

== Exploration ==
- August 6 – Discovery Expedition: Robert Falcon Scott sets sail on the RRS Discovery to explore the Ross Sea in Antarctica.

== History of Science ==
- September 25 – Establishment of Deutsche Gesellschaft für Geschichte der Medizin und der Naturwissenschaften, the world's first history of science society.

== Mathematics ==
- April – Henri Lebesgue defines Lebesgue integration for some function f(x).
- May/June – Russell's paradox: Bertrand Russell shows that Georg Cantor's naive set theory leads to a contradiction.
- Élie Cartan develops the exterior derivative.
- Leonard Eugene Dickson publishes Linear groups with an exposition of the Galois field theory in Leipzig, advancing the classification of finite simple groups and listing almost all non-abelian simple groups having order less than one billion.
- Aleksandr Lyapunov proves the central limit theorem rigorously using characteristic functions.

== Paleontology ==
- Publication begins of A Monograph of British Graptolites by Gertrude L. Elles and Dr Ethel M. R. Wood, edited by Charles Lapworth.

== Photography ==
- Eastman Kodak introduce the 120 film.

== Physics ==
- January 23 – Guglielmo Marconi sends a radio signal 299 km (186 mi) 'over the horizon' in the British Isles from Niton on the Isle of Wight to The Lizard in Cornwall.
- December 12 – Marconi receives the first trans-Atlantic radio signal, sent from Poldhu in Cornwall, England, to Newfoundland, the letter "S" in Morse.
- Albert Einstein publishes his conclusions on capillarity.
- Owen Richardson describes the phenomenon in thermionic emission which gives rise to Richardson's Law.
- Ivan Yarkovsky describes the Yarkovsky effect, a thermal force acting on rotating bodies in space, in a pamphlet on "The density of light ether and the resistance it offers to motion" published in Bryansk.

== Physiology and medicine ==
- November 25 – Auguste Deter is first examined by Dr Alois Alzheimer in Frankfort leading to a diagnosis of the condition that will carry Alzheimer's name.
- Jōkichi Takamine isolates and names adrenaline from mammalian organs.
- Ivan Pavlov develops the theory of the "conditional reflex".
- Georg Kelling of Dresden performs the first "coelioscopy" (laparoscopic surgery), on a dog.
- William C. Gorgas controls the spread of yellow fever in Cuba by a mosquito eradication program.
- Scottish military doctor William Boog Leishman identifies organisms from the spleen of a patient who had died from "Dum Dum fever" (later known as leishmaniasis) and proposes them to be trypanosomes, found for the first time in India.
- An improved sphygmomanometer, for the measurement of blood pressure, is invented and popularized by Harvey Cushing.
- Karl Landsteiner discovers the existence of different human blood types
- German Oscar Troplowitz invents for Beiersdorf the medical plaster patch 'Leukoplast'.

== Psychology ==
- Edward B. Titchener's textbook Experimental Psychology popularizes the Ebbinghaus illusion.

== Technology ==
- May 16 – TS King Edward is launched at William Denny and Brothers' shipyard in Dumbarton, Scotland. The first commercial merchant vessel propelled by steam turbines, she enters excursion service on the Firth of Clyde on July 1.
- July 10 – The world's first passenger-carrying trolleybus in regular service operates on the Biela Valley Trolleybus route at Koeninggstein in Germany, pioneering Max Schiemann's under-running trolley current collection system.
- August 30 – Hubert Cecil Booth patents the electrically powered vacuum cleaner in the United Kingdom
- November 30 – Frank Hornby of Liverpool is granted a U.K. patent for the construction toy that will become Meccano.
- December 3 – King C. Gillette files a U.S. patent application for his design of safety razor utilizing thin, disposable blades of stamped steel.
- Theodor Rall patents his design of rolling lift bridge.
- German engineer Richard Fiedler invents the modern flamethrower, the Kleinflammenwerfer.
- Ernest Godward invents the spiral hairpin in New Zealand.

== Publications ==
- H. G. Wells' "scientific romance" The First Men in the Moon and his collected articles on futurology Anticipations of the Reaction of Mechanical and Scientific Progress Upon Human Life and Thought.

== Awards ==
- First Nobel Prizes awarded
  - Physics – Wilhelm Röntgen
  - Chemistry – J. H. van 't Hoff
  - Medicine – Emil Adolf von Behring
- Copley Medal – J. Willard Gibbs
- Wollaston Medal for Geology – Charles Barrois

== Births ==
- January 14 – Alfred Tarski (died 1983), Polish Jewish logician and mathematician.
- January 18 – Frank Zamboni (died 1988), American inventor
- February 28 – Linus Pauling (died 1994), American chemist, Nobel Prize winner for chemistry and peace.
- March 2 – Grete Hermann (died 1984), German mathematician and philosopher
- March 6 – Rex Wailes (died 1986), English engineer and historian of technology.
- March 9 – Joachim Hämmerling (died 1980), German-born Danish biologist.
- April 13 – Jacques Lacan (died 1981), French psychoanalyst.
- April 23 – E. B. Ford (died 1988), English ecological geneticist and lepidopterist.
- April 29 – Hirohito (died 1989), marine biologist and Emperor of Japan.
- May 21 – Manfred Aschner (died 1989), German-born Israeli microbiologist and entomologist.
- July 2 – Esther Somerfeld-Ziskind (died 2002), American neurologist and psychiatrist.
- August 8 – Ernest Lawrence (died 1958), American nuclear scientist and winner of the Nobel Prize in Physics in 1939.
- August 10 – Franco Rasetti (died 2001), Italian physicist.
- September 15 – Elie Carafoli (died 1983), Aromanian aeronautical engineer.
- September 29 – Enrico Fermi (died 1954), Italian nuclear physicist.
- October 8 – Mark Oliphant (died 2000), Australian nuclear physicist.
- November 6 – Kathleen Mary Drew-Baker (died 1957), British phycologist.
- December 5 – Werner Heisenberg (died 1976), German theoretical physicist.
- December 16 – Margaret Mead (died 1978), American cultural anthropologist.
- December 20 – Robert J. Van de Graaff (died 1967), American physicist.

== Deaths ==
- January 21 – Elisha Gray (born 1835), American electrical engineer.
- February 11 – Henry Willis (born 1821), English organ builder.
- February 21 – George FitzGerald (born 1851), Irish physicist.
- April 16 – Henry Augustus Rowland (born 1848), American physicist.
- September 10 – Emanuella Carlbeck (born 1829), Swedish pioneer in the education of students with intellectual disability.
