= 1911 in archaeology =

Below are notable events in archaeology that occurred in 1911.

== Explorations ==
- 24 July: Hiram Bingham III rediscovers Machu Picchu, Peru.

== Excavations ==
- Excavations of the ruins of Tell el-Amarna, Egypt, by Ludwig Borchardt of the Deutsche Orient-Gesellschaft (continues to 1914).
- First excavations of ancient Samarra, Iraq, by Ernst Herzfeld (continues to 1914).
- First excavations of Tell Halaf, Syria, by Max von Oppenheim (continues to 1913).
- Excavations of the Hittite city of Carchemish, northern Syria, by D. G. Hogarth of the Ashmolean Museum with Leonard Woolley and T. E. Lawrence (continues to 1914).
- First excavations of Hengistbury Head by J. P. Bushe-Fox.
- First excavations at Beit Shemesh (continues to 1912).
- Excavations at the necropolis of Tanagra (Boeotia) by Nikolaos Papadakis.

== Publications ==
- James Curle: A Roman Frontier Post and its People: the Fort of Newstead.
- Grafton Elliot Smith: The Ancient Egyptians and the Origin of Civilization.

== Finds ==
- Venus of Laussel.
- First artefacts found at Dolní Věstonice.
- Magdalenian Girl.
- Clacton Spear.

== Births ==
- Leslie Peter Wenham, Yorkshire archaeologist (died 1990)

== Deaths ==
- 19 August: John Robert Mortimer, Yorkshire archaeologist (born 1825)
