= 1906 in archaeology =

Below are notable events in archaeology that occurred in 1906.

== Explorations ==
- Christiana Herringham begins copying the Ajanta Caves paintings.

== Excavations ==
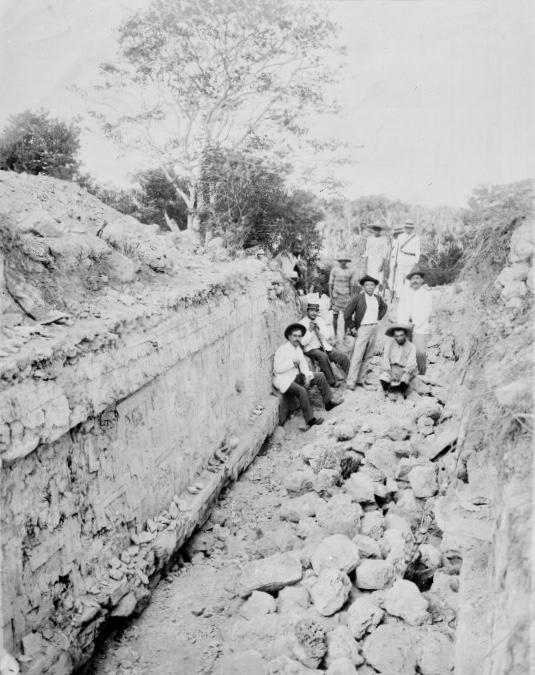
Maya painted stucco reliefs discovered in Acanceh, Yucatán Mexico

- Hugo Winckler begins excavations at Hattusa near Boğazköy in Turkey for the Deutsche Orient-Gesellschaft with Theodore Makridi which identify it as the royal capital of the Hittites (continue to 1911).
- Richard MacGillivray Dawkins begins excavations at the Sanctuary of Artemis Orthia in Sparta (continue to 1910).
- T. May begins excavations of the Principia of the Roman fort at Bremetennacum (Ribchester), Lancashire, England (continue to 1907).
- Excavations at Lisht are resumed by the Egyptian Expedition of the Metropolitan Museum of Art, New York (continue for 14 seasons to 1934).
- Approximate date – Antonios Keramopoulos begins systematic excavations of Mycenaean Thebes, Greece, starting at the Kolonaki hill (continue to 1921).

== Finds ==
- Mummy of Senebtisi at Lisht in Egypt.
- The Sounion Kouros at Cape Sounion in Greece.

== Publications ==
- "Note sur une statuette mexicaine en wernerite représentant la déesse Ixcuina" by Ernest-Théodore Hamy in the Journal de la Société des Américanistes about the Dumbarton Oaks birthing figure.

== Events ==
- 8 June – Antiquities Act is passed by the United States Congress
- 29 June – Mesa Verde, an Ancestral Puebloan site, is made a United States National Park
- September – A military balloon is flown over Stonehenge carrying out the first aerial photography in archaeology.

== Births ==
- 5 January – Kathleen Kenyon, English archaeologist of the Neolithic Fertile Crescent and college principal (d. 1978).
- 12 January – Eric Birley, British archaeologist associated with the excavations of forts on Hadrian's Wall (d. 1995).
- 27 January – Alberto Ruz Lhuillier, Mexican archaeologist (d. 1979).
- 26 June – Joan du Plat Taylor, British maritime archaeologist (d. 1983).
