= 1907 in archaeology =

Below are notable events in archaeology that occurred in 1907.

== Explorations ==
- Theodor Makridi Bey makes brief explorations at Alaca Höyük.

== Excavations ==
- January 6 – Tomb KV55 (almost certainly that of Akhenaten, 18th Dynasty) in Egypt's Valley of the Kings is discovered by Edward R. Ayrton.
- March – Ludwig Borchardt begins excavating the Pyramid of Sahure in Egypt.
- William M. Ramsay and Gertrude Bell work in Turkey.
- John Garstang begins work at Sakçagözü (continues to 1912).
- Ernst Sellin begins work at Tell es-Sultan, Jericho.
- Arthur Acton begins work at the Roman legionary works depot at Holt, Wales.
- British School at Athens begins excavations in Ritsona.

== Finds ==
- March – Aurel Stein discovers the Diamond Sūtra, a woodblock printed Buddhist scripture dated 868, at the Mogao Caves, near Dunhuang; it is "the earliest complete survival of a dated printed book".
- October 21 – Jaw of Homo heidelbergensis (Mauer 1) found.
- Medieval frescos uncovered in Fulltofta Church, Sweden.
- Lady of Auxerre located in a storeroom of the Louvre.

== Publications ==
- First publication of Lokrume helmet fragment, the earliest record of a Viking Age helmet.
- E. A. Wallis Budge – The Egyptian Sudan: its History and Monuments.
- Aleš Hrdlička – Skeletal Remains Suggesting or Attributed to Early Man in North America.

== Miscellaneous ==
- March 11 – Chaco Canyon National Monument is established.
- Lukis Museum opens on Guernsey.
- Howard Carter begins to work for Lord Carnarvon to supervise his excavations in Egypt.

== Births ==
- July 28 – Grahame Clark, English archaeologist (died 1995).
- July 29 – Aileen Fox, English archaeologist (died 2005).
- August 30 – Bertha "Birdie" Parker, Native American archaeologist (died 1978).
