= 1909 in archaeology =

Below are notable events in archaeology that occurred in 1909.

== Explorations ==
- Discovery of the Burgess Shale Cambrian fossil site in the Canadian Rockies by palaeontologist Charles Walcott of the Smithsonian Institution.

== Excavations ==
- Excavation of Calleva Atrebatum (Silchester Roman Town) in England by the Society of Antiquaries of London completed (begun in 1890).
- Excavations at Ritsona in Boeotia by Ronald Burrows and Percy and Annie Ure of the American School of Classical Studies at Athens begin (completed in 1922).
- Excavations at Villa of Mysteries at Pompeii begin.
- At Knap Hill in Wiltshire, England, the first excavation of a causewayed enclosure, by Ben and Maud Cunnington, is completed (begun in 1908).

== Finds ==
- Betatakin ruins discovered by Byron Cummings

== Miscellaneous ==
- The National Trust purchases White Barrow on Salisbury Plain in England, its first archaeological site.

== Births ==
- January 8 – Nikolaos Platon, Greek archaeologist (d. 1992)
- December 10 – Robert Wauchope, American archaeologist and anthropologist (d. 1979)
- Su Bingqi, Chinese archaeologist (d. 1997)
