= 1901 in archaeology =

Below are notable events in archaeology that occurred in 1901.

== Events ==
- British School at Rome established.

== Excavations ==
- KV44 at the Valley of the Kings, Egypt by Howard Carter and Donald P. Ryan.
- Excavations and renovations at Mitla conducted by Leopoldo Batres.
- Excavation of the Minoan town at Gournia by Harriet Boyd-Hawes and Blanche Wheeler Williams begins (continues to 1904).

== Finds ==
- December: Code of Hammurabi at Susa.
- Ivory Bangle Lady in York, England, the skeleton and grave goods of a later fourth century high-status, possibly Christian, inhabitant of Eboracum, much later identified as of mixed race.
- Heracles of Antikythera in the Antikythera wreck, Greece.

== Miscellaneous ==
- Edward Herbert Thompson buys the ruins of Chichen Itza for 75 United States dollars
- General Land Office special agent S. J. Holsinger recommends creating a national park to preserve archaeological sites in Chaco Canyon

== Births ==
- February 15 – André Parrot, French archaeologist of the Near East (d. 1980)
- July 17 – Theresa Goell, American archaeologist of the Near East (d. 1985)
- October 18 – A. Ledyard Smith, American archaeologist of the Americas (d. 1985)
- October 27 – Aage Roussell, Danish archaeologist of Greenland (d. 1972)
- November 17 (O.S. November 4) – Spyridon Marinatos, Greek archaeologist of the Aegean Bronze Age (d. 1974)
- Charles Green, English archaeologist (d. 1972)

== Deaths ==
- May 10 – Christian Maclagan, Scottish antiquary (b. 1811)
