= 1910 in archaeology =

Below are notable events in archaeology that occurred in 1910.

== Excavations ==
- Francis Llewellyn Griffith begins a 4-year series of excavations in Nubia.
- Edgar Lee Hewett begins a 4-year project at Quiriguá.
- Antonios Keramopoulos excavates the temple of Apollo in Thebes, Greece.
- St Piran's Oratory, Perranzabuloe, Cornwall, England.
- Coldrum Long Barrow in southeast England.
- Jesús Carballo begins the first excavations at the archaeological site of Atapuerca in northern Spain.
- Robert Ranulph Marett begins a 4-year project at the Paleolithic site of La Cotte de St Brelade on Jersey, Channel Islands.

== Finds ==
- December – 'Meroë Head' looted from a bronze statue of Roman emperor Augustus buried in the Kushite site of Meroë in modern Sudan, excavated by John Garstang.

== Events ==
- United Fruit Company purchases land in Guatemala including the Maya site of Quiriguá; 30 acres (120,000 m^{2}) including and around the ruins are set aside as an archaeological zone.
- The National Museums of Kenya, a governmental body maintaining several museums and monuments in Kenya (with headquarters in Nairobi), is founded by the East Africa Natural History Society.

== Births ==
- February 13 – Ignacio Bernal, Mexican archaeologist (d. 1992).
- May 3 – Anne Strachan Robertson, Scottish archaeologist and numismatist (d. 1997).
- May 28 – Stuart Piggott, English archaeologist (d. 1996).
- July 10 – Wilhelmina Feemster Jashemski, American archaeologist (d. 2007).
- August 5 – Jacquetta Hawkes, British archaeologist (d. 1996).

== Deaths ==
- May 26 – Cyrus Thomas, American ethnologist and archaeologist (b. 1825).
- June 22 – Richard Wetherill, American archaeologist (b. 1858).
- August 12 – Adolf Michaelis, German classical scholar (b. 1835).
- August 23 – Jakob Messikommer, Swiss archaeologist (b. 1828).

== See also ==
- Pompeii
