= 1966 in archaeology =

List of years in archaeology	(table)
- … 1956; 1957; 1958; 1959; 1960; 1961; 1962; 1963; 1964; 1965; 1966; 1967; 1968; 1969; 1970; 1971; 1972; 1973; 1974; 1975; 1976 …
- In science 1963 1964 1965 1966 1967 1968 1969
- Art; Archaeology; Architecture; Literature; Music; Philosophy; Science; +...

The year 1966 in archaeology involved some significant events.

== Excavations ==
- Excavation of the Maya site of Chinkultic by Stephan F. de Borhegyi of the Public Museum of Milwaukee, Wisconsin.
- New excavations at Viroconium (Wroxeter) in England begin.
- Excavations at Mezhirich, Ukraine, by I. G. Pidoplichko begin (continue to 1974).
- First organized excavations at Minshat Abu Omar.
- Excavations at Tel Arad by Yohanan Aharoni (continues until 1967).

== Finds ==
- March 22 - The Fishpool Hoard from Nottinghamshire, England
- The third trove of Qabala treasures
- Ongoing excavations at Peking Man Site in Zhoukoudian, China unearth a premolar and two pieces of skull fragment
- The Magerius Mosaic from Smirat, Tunisia

== Publications ==
- Max Mallowan - Nimrud and its Remains.
- Oxford City and County Museum - City of Oxford Redevelopment: Archaeological Implications.

== Events ==
- June 18 - The archaeology-related television series Chronicle begins airing on BBC Two in the United Kingdom.
- The existence of at least 123 rock-cut monolithic churches in the Tigray Region is revealed by Ethiopian Catholic priest Dr Abba Tewelde Medhin Josief at a conference.
- Start of probably the first course in the United States to carry the title "Historical Archaeology", taught at the University of Pennsylvania by John L. Cotter of the National Park Service.

== Births ==
- August 30 - Joann Fletcher, English Egyptologist

== Deaths ==
- June 5 - Natacha Rambova, American costume designer and Egyptologist (born 1897)
