= 1964 in archaeology =

List of years in archaeology	(table)
- … 1954; 1955; 1956; 1957; 1958; 1959; 1960; 1961; 1962; 1963; 1964; 1965; 1966; 1967; 1968; 1969; 1970; 1971; 1972; 1973; 1974 …
- In science 1961 1962 1963 1964 1965 1966 1967
- Art; Archaeology; Architecture; Literature; Music; Philosophy; Science; +...

The year 1964 in archaeology involved some significant events.

== Excavations ==
- Seibal Harvard University project begins under direction of Gordon R. Willey and A. Ledyard Smith.
- Et-Tell excavations under Joseph Callaway begin (continue through 1970).
- Saqqara excavations under Bryan Emery begin (continue through 1971).
- Pool of Bethesda excavations.
- Snaketown by Emil Haury, with assistance from E. B. Sayles, Erik K. Reed, and Irwin and Julian Hayden.
- Ebla excavations by the University of Rome La Sapienza directed by Paolo Matthiae begin.
- Excavations in Hane, Marquesas Islands, by Yosihiko H. Sinoto begin.
- Tomb of Princess Yongtai excavated in Qianling Mausoleum, China.
- The Missione Archaeologica Italiana a Malta begins excavations at Ras il-Wardija, Gozo, Malta (continues through 1967).
- First full-scale excavation of Roman villa at Oplontis in Italy begins.
- Archaeological site of Atapuerca in Spain directed by Francisco Jordá Cerdá.
- Argentine surveyor and archaeologist Carlos J. Gradin and his team begins the most profound research on Cueva de las Manos in a 30-year-long study of the caves and their art.
- Excavation of Tel Arad by Yohanan Aharoni (continues until 1967).

== Finds ==
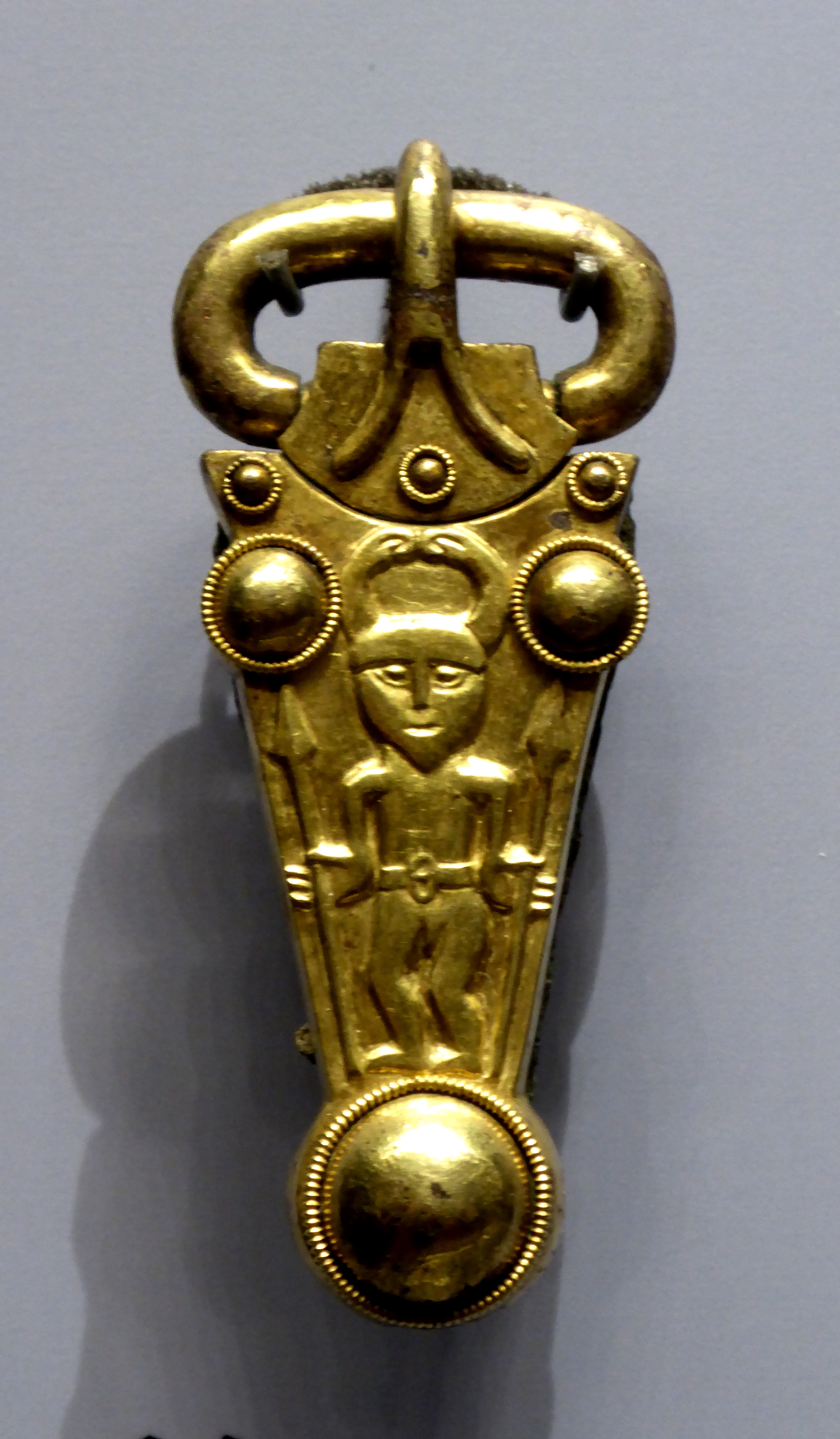
The Finglesham Buckle is on display at the Ashmolean Museum

- Getty Victorious Youth in the sea off Fano.
- The second trove of Qabala treasures in Azerbaijan.
- Mummies on Pichu Pichu in the Peruvian Andes.
- Teeth from Grotta del Cavallo in southern Italy, identified in 2011 as the oldest known remains of European early modern humans.
- Pyrgi Tablets at the site of ancient Pyrgi in Lazio, Italy.
- A buckle depicting a man holding a spear in each hand is discovered at Finglesham Anglo-Saxon cemetery during excavations led by Sonia Chadwick Hawkes.

== Events ==
- May 31 – The Venice Charter for the Conservation and Restoration of Monuments and Sites is adopted by the Second International Congress of Architects and Specialists of Historic Buildings.
- November 30 – Western Australian Museum Act Amendment Act provides for protection of pre-1900 wrecks in local waters.
- Project to move the Abu Simbel temples to prevent their inundation by the Aswan High Dam begins.

== Publications ==
- L. Sprague de Camp and Catherine Crook de Camp - Ancient Ruins and Archaeology.
- Journal of Industrial Archaeology begins publication.

== Awards ==
- Ian Richmond knighted.

== Births ==
- February – Duan Qingbo, Chinese archaeologist (died 2019)
