= 1967 in archaeology =

List of years in archaeology	(table)
- … 1957; 1958; 1959; 1960; 1961; 1962; 1963; 1964; 1965; 1966; 1967; 1968; 1969; 1970; 1971; 1972; 1973; 1974; 1975; 1976; 1977 …
- In science 1964 1965 1966 1967 1968 1969 1970
- Art; Archaeology; Architecture; Literature; Music; Philosophy; Science; +...

The year 1967 in archaeology involved some significant events.

== Explorations ==
- June 12 - New England Textile Mills Survey commenced by the Historic American Buildings Survey.
- July–September - Provo Brickyard Turbine House, Provo, Utah, recorded by the Historic American Buildings Survey.

== Excavations ==
- The first treasure from the Spanish Armada wreck Girona is recovered off Northern Ireland.
- Excavations at Tel Arad by Yohanan Aharoni end (began 1962).

== Publications ==
- Post-medieval archaeology: the journal of the Society for Post-Medieval Archaeology first published

== Finds ==
- May 20 - Hoard of denarii found at Little Brickhill in Buckinghamshire, England.
- Dholavira site is discovered by Shri Jagatpati Joshi.
- Akrotiri (prehistoric city) is discovered.

== Events ==
- January 6 - The Society for Historical Archaeology is founded in the United States.
- November 3–5 - The theory and practice of industrial archaeology: the Bath Conference on Industrial archaeology.

== Births ==
- February 21 - Neil Oliver, Scottish-born archaeologist and television presenter
