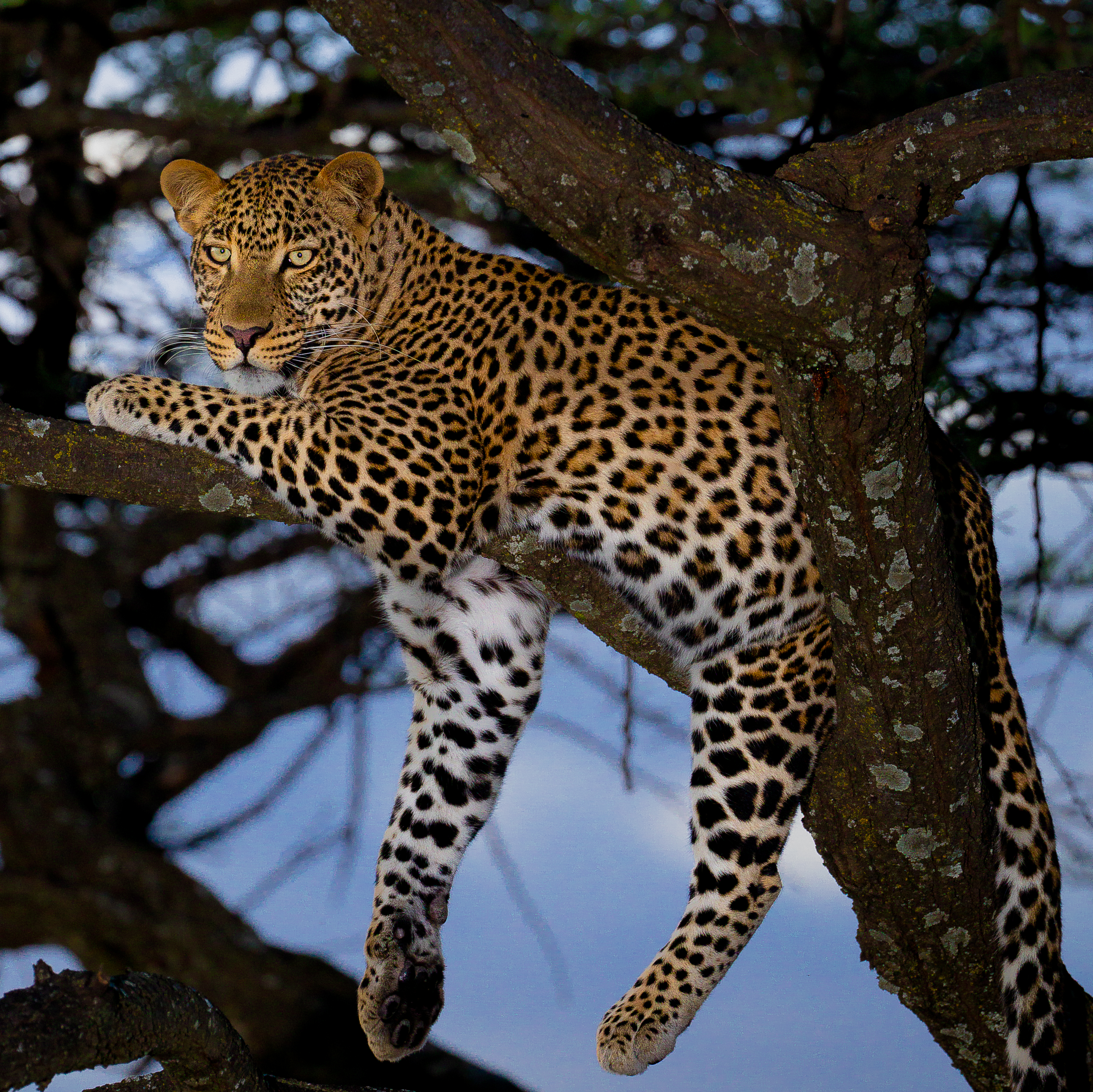
- Male African leopard in Maasai Mara National Reserve

Conservation status
- Vulnerable (IUCN 3.1)
- CITES Appendix I

Scientific classification
- Kingdom: Animalia
- Phylum: Chordata
- Class: Mammalia
- Order: Carnivora
- Family: Felidae
- Genus: Panthera
- Species: P. pardus

Binomial name
- Panthera pardus (Linnaeus, 1758)

Subspecies
- See § Living subspecies
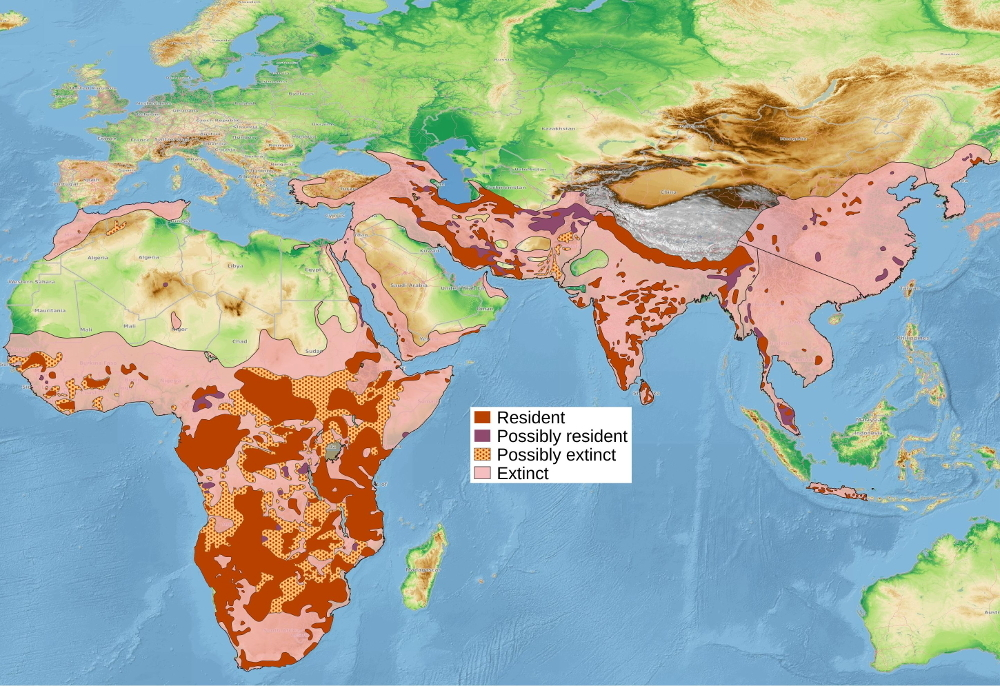
- Present and historical distribution of the leopard

= Leopard =

Leopard Temporal range: Early Pleistocene – Present

Species of cat native to Africa and Asia

The leopard (Panthera pardus) is one of the five extant cat species in the genus Panthera. It has a pale yellowish to dark golden fur with dark spots grouped in rosettes. Its body is slender and muscular, reaching a length of 92–183 cm (36–72 in) with a 66–102 cm (26–40 in) long tail and a shoulder height of 60–70 cm (24–28 in). Males typically weigh 30.9–72 kg (68–159 lb), and females 20.5–43 kg (45–95 lb).

The leopard was first described in 1758, and several subspecies were proposed in the 19th and 20th centuries. Today, eight subspecies are recognised in its wide range in Africa and Asia. It initially evolved in Africa during the Early Pleistocene, before migrating into Eurasia around the Early–Middle Pleistocene transition. Leopards were formerly present across Europe, but became extinct in the region at around the end of the Late Pleistocene-early Holocene.

The leopard is adapted to a variety of habitats ranging from rainforest to steppe, including arid and montane areas. It is an opportunistic predator, hunting mostly hooved mammals and primates. It relies on its spotted pattern for camouflage as it stalks and ambushes its prey, which it sometimes drags up a tree. It is a solitary animal outside the mating season and when raising cubs. Females usually give birth to a litter of 2–4 cubs once in 15–24 months. Both male and female leopards typically reach sexual maturity at the age 2–2.5 years.

Listed as Vulnerable on the IUCN Red List, leopard populations are currently threatened by habitat loss and fragmentation, and are declining in large parts of the global range. Leopards have had cultural roles in Ancient Greece, West Africa and modern Western culture. Leopard skins are popular in fashion.

== Etymology ==
The English name "leopard" comes from Old French leupart or Middle French liepart, which derives from Latin leopardus and ancient Greek λεόπαρδος (leopardos); Leopardos could be a compound of λέων (leōn), meaning 'lion', and πάρδος (pardos), meaning 'spotted'. The word λεόπαρδος originally referred to a cheetah (Acinonyx jubatus).

"Panther" is another common name, derived from Latin panther and ancient Greek πάνθηρ (pánthēr); The generic name Panthera originates in Latin panthera, a hunting net for catching wild beasts to be used by the Romans in combats. Pardus is the masculine singular form.

== Taxonomy ==
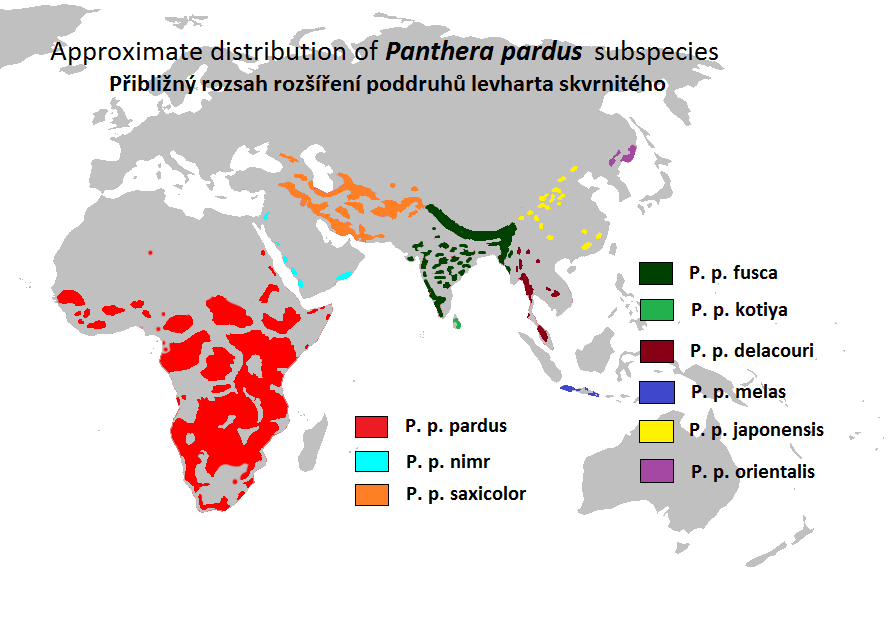
Map showing approximate distribution of leopard subspecies

Felis pardus was the scientific name proposed by Carl Linnaeus in 1758. The generic name Panthera was first used by Lorenz Oken in 1816, who included all the known spotted cats into this group. Oken's classification was not widely accepted, and Felis or Leopardus was used as the generic name until the early 20th century.

The leopard was designated as the type species of Panthera by Joel Asaph Allen in 1902. In 1917, Reginald Innes Pocock also subordinated the tiger (P. tigris), lion (P. leo), and jaguar (P. onca) to Panthera.

=== Living subspecies ===
Following Linnaeus' first description, 27 leopard subspecies were proposed by naturalists between 1794 and 1956. Since 1996, only eight subspecies have been considered valid on the basis of mitochondrial analysis. Later analysis revealed a ninth valid subspecies, the Arabian leopard.

In 2017, the Cat Classification Task Force of the Cat Specialist Group recognized the following eight subspecies as valid taxa:

| Subspecies | Distribution | Image |
|---|---|---|
| African leopard (P. p. pardus) (Linnaeus, 1758) | It is the most widespread leopard subspecies and is native to most of Sub-Saharan Africa, but likely locally extinct in Mauritania, Togo, Morocco, Algeria, Tunisia and Libya and most likely also in Gambia and Lesotho. | |
| Indian leopard (P. p. fusca) (Meyer, 1794) | It occurs in the Indian subcontinent, Myanmar and southern Tibet. It is listed as Near Threatened. | |
| Javan leopard (P. p. melas) (Cuvier, 1809) | It is native to Java in Indonesia and has been assessed as Endangered in 2021. | |
| Arabian leopard (P. p. nimr) (Hemprich and Ehrenberg, 1830) | It is the smallest leopard subspecies and considered endemic to the Arabian Peninsula. In 2023, it was assessed as Critically Endangered as the population was estimated to comprise 100–120 individuals in Oman and Yemen; it is considered possibly extinct in Saudi Arabia and extinct in Egypt's Sinai Peninsula, Israel, Palestine, Jordan and United Arab Emirates. | |
| P. p. tulliana (Valenciennes, 1856) | It occurs from eastern Turkey and the Caucasus to the Iranian Plateau and the Hindu Kush into the western Himalayas. It is listed as Endangered. It is locally extinct in Uzbekistan and Tajikistan. The Balochistan leopard population in the south of Iran, Afghanistan and Pakistan is separated from the northern population by the Dasht-e Kavir and Dasht-e Lut deserts. | |
| Amur leopard (P. p. orientalis) (Schlegel, 1857) | It is native to the Russian Far East and northern China, but is locally extinct in the Korean peninsula. | |
| Indochinese leopard (P. p. delacouri) Pocock, 1930 | It occurs in mainland Southeast Asia and southern China, and is listed as Critically Endangered. It is locally extinct in Hong Kong, Singapore, Laos and Vietnam. | |
| Sri Lankan leopard (P. p. kotiya) Deraniyagala, 1956 | It is native to Sri Lanka and listed as Vulnerable. | |

Results of an analysis of molecular variance and pairwise fixation index of 182 African leopard museum specimens showed that some African leopards exhibit higher genetic differences than Asian leopard subspecies.

=== Evolution ===
Two cladograms proposed for Panthera. The upper cladogram is based on the 2006 and 2009 studies, while the lower is based on the 2010 and 2011 studies.

Results of phylogenetic studies based on nuclear DNA and mitochondrial DNA analysis showed that the last common ancestor of the Panthera and Neofelis genera is thought to have lived about 6.37 million years ago. Neofelis diverged about 8.66 million years ago from the Panthera lineage. The tiger diverged about 6.55 million years ago, followed by the snow leopard about 4.63 million years ago and the leopard about 4.35 million years ago. The leopard is a sister taxon to a clade within Panthera, consisting of the lion and the jaguar.

Results of a phylogenetic analysis of chemical secretions amongst cats indicated that the leopard is closely related to the lion. The geographic origin of the Panthera is most likely northern Central Asia. The leopard-lion clade was distributed in the Asian and African Palearctic since at least the early Pliocene. The leopard-lion clade diverged 3.1–1.95 million years ago. Additionally, a 2016 study revealed that the mitochondrial genomes of the leopard, lion and snow leopard are more similar to each other than their nuclear genomes, indicating that their ancestors hybridized with the snow leopard at some point in their evolution.

The oldest unambiguous fossils of the leopard are from Eastern Africa, dating to around 2 million years ago.

Leopard-like fossil bones and teeth possibly dating to the Pliocene were excavated in Perrier in France, northeast of London, and in Valdarno, Italy. Until 1940, similar fossils dating back to the Pleistocene were excavated mostly in loess and caves at 40 sites in Europe, including Furninha Cave near Lisbon, Genista Caves in Gibraltar, and Santander Province in northern Spain to several sites across France, Switzerland, Italy, Austria, Germany, in the north up to Derby in England, in the east to Přerov in the Czech Republic and the Baranya in southern Hungary. Leopards arrived in Eurasia during the late Early to Middle Pleistocene around 1.2 to 0.6 million years ago. Four European Pleistocene leopard subspecies were proposed. P. p. begoueni from the beginning of the Early Pleistocene was replaced about 0.6 million years ago by P. p. sickenbergi, which in turn was replaced by P. p. antiqua around 0.3 million years ago. P. p. spelaea is the most recent subspecies that appeared at the beginning of the Late Pleistocene and survived until about 11,000 years ago and possibly into the early Holocene in the Iberian Peninsula.

Leopards depicted in cave paintings in Chauvet Cave provide indirect evidence of leopard presence in Europe. Leopard fossils dating to the Late Pleistocene were found in Biśnik Cave in south-central Poland. Fossil remains were also excavated in the Iberian Mountains, in the Italian Peninsula, and in the Balkans. Leopard fossils were also found in southern Taiwan. Putative leopard and tiger fossils dating to the Late Pleistocene were excavated in the Japanese archipelago, but mitochondrial and nuclear genome analysis indicates that they represent P. spelaea.

=== Hybrids ===
In 1953, a male leopard and a female lion were crossbred in Hanshin Park in Nishinomiya, Japan. Their offspring known as a leopon was born in 1959 and 1961, all cubs were spotted and bigger than a juvenile leopard. Attempts to mate a leopon with a tigress proved unsuccessful.

== Characteristics ==
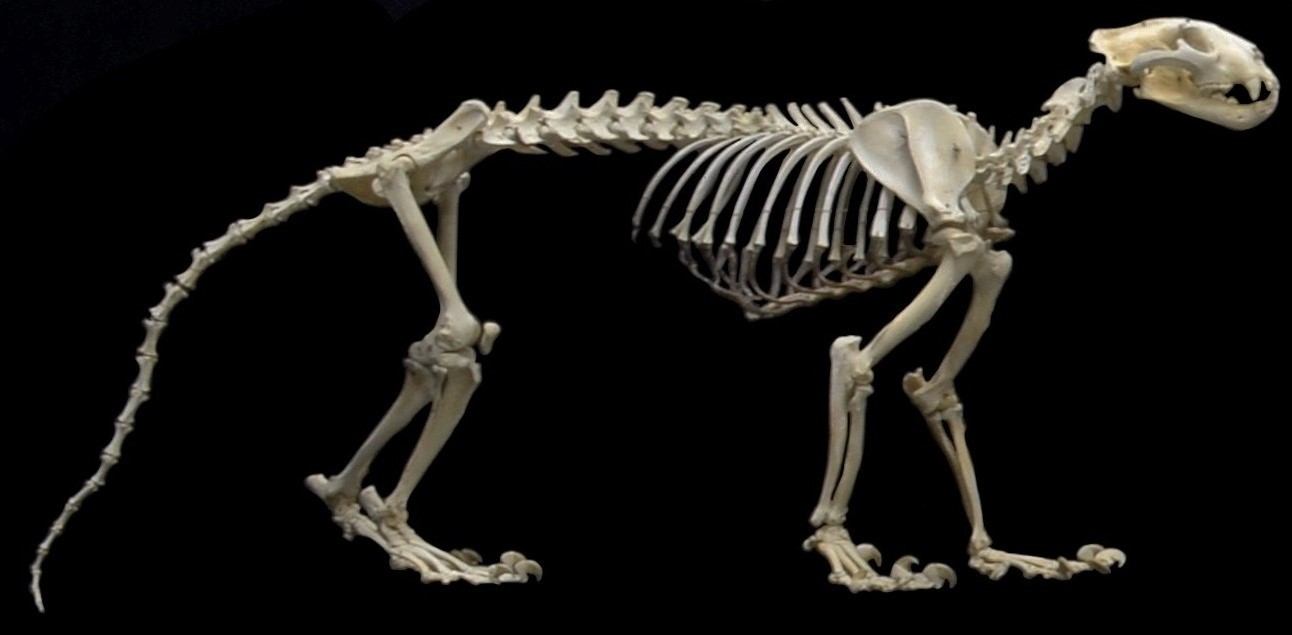
Mounted skeleton

3D model of skeleton

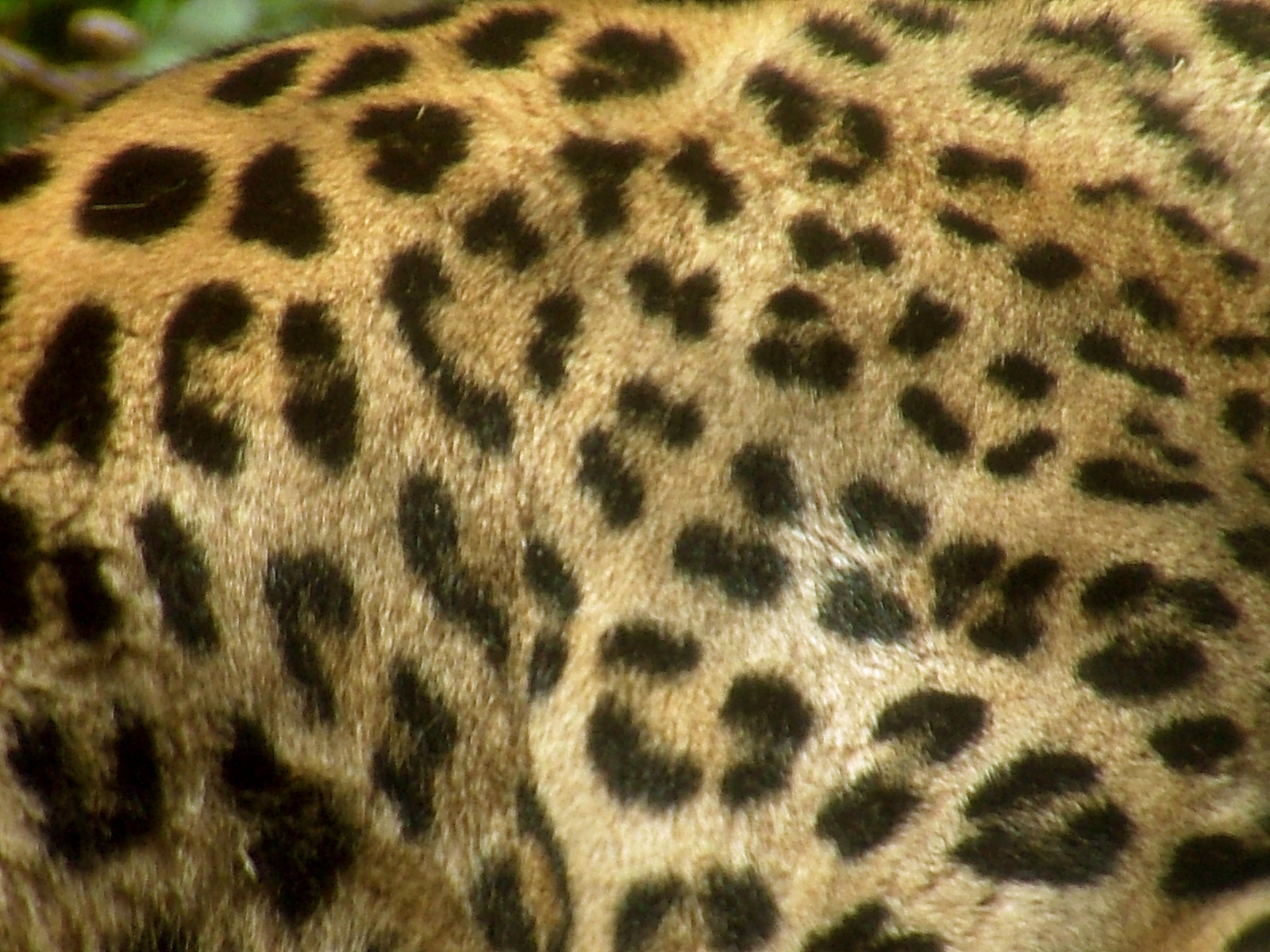
Rosettes of a leopard

A melanistic leopard or black panther

The leopard's fur is generally soft and thick, notably softer on the belly than on the back. Its skin colour varies between individuals from pale yellowish to dark golden with dark spots grouped in rosettes. Its underbelly is white and its ringed tail is shorter than its body. Its pupils are round. Leopards living in arid regions are pale cream, yellowish to ochraceous and rufous in colour; those living in forests and mountains are much darker and deep golden. Spots fade toward the white underbelly and the insides and lower parts of the legs. Rosettes are circular in East African leopard populations, and tend to be squarish in Southern African and larger in Asian leopard populations. The fur tends to be greyish in colder climates, and dark golden in rainforest habitats. Rosette patterns are unique in each individual. This pattern is thought to be an adaptation to dense vegetation with patchy shadows, where it serves as camouflage.

Its white-tipped tail is about 60–100 cm (23.6–39.4 in) long, white underneath and with spots that form incomplete bands toward the end of the tail. The guard hairs protecting the basal hairs are short, 3–4 mm (0.1–0.2 in) in face and head, and increase in length toward the flanks and the belly to about 25–30 mm (1.0–1.2 in). Juveniles have woolly fur that appear to be dark-coloured due to the densely arranged spots. Its fur tends to grow longer in colder climates. The leopard's rosettes differ from those of the jaguar, which are darker and with smaller spots inside. The leopard has a diploid chromosome number of 38.

Melanistic leopards are also known as black panthers. Melanism in leopards is caused by a recessive allele and is inherited as a recessive trait. In India, nine pale and white leopards were reported between 1905 and 1967. Leopards exhibiting erythrism were recorded between 1990 and 2015 in South Africa's Madikwe Game Reserve and in Mpumalanga. The cause of this morph known as a "strawberry leopard" or "pink panther" is not well understood.

=== Size ===
The leopard is a slender and muscular cat, with relatively short limbs and a broad head. It is sexually dimorphic with males larger and heavier than females. Males stand 60–70 cm (24–28 in) at the shoulder, while females are 57–64 cm (22–25 in) tall. The head-and-body length ranges between 92 and 183 cm (36 and 72 in) with a 66 to 102 cm (26 to 40 in) long tail. Sizes vary geographically. Males typically weigh 30.9–72 kg (68–159 lb), and females 20.5–43 kg (45–95 lb). Occasionally, large males can grow up to 91 kg (201 lb). Leopards from the Cape Province in South Africa are generally smaller, reaching only 20–45 kg (44–99 lb) in males. The heaviest wild leopard in Southern Africa weighed around 96 kg (212 lb), and it measured 262 cm (103 in). In 2016, an Indian leopard killed in Himachal Pradesh measured 261 cm (103 in) with an estimated weight of 78.5 kg (173 lb); it was perhaps the largest known wild leopard in India.

The largest recorded skull of a leopard was found in India in 1920 and measured 28 cm (11 in) in basal length, 20 cm (7.9 in) in breadth, and weighed 1 kg (2.2 lb). The skull of an African leopard measured 286 mm (11.3 in) in basal length, and 181 mm (7.1 in) in breadth, and weighed 790 g (28 oz).

== Distribution and habitat ==
Video of a leopard in the wild

The leopard has the widest distribution of all wild cats, across Africa and Asia, although populations are fragmented and declining. It inhabits savanna and rainforest, and grasslands, woodlands and riparian forests that remain largely undisturbed. It inhabits urban environments, if it is not persecuted, has sufficient prey and patches of vegetation for shelter.

The leopard's range in West Africa is estimated to have declined by 95%, and in the Sahara desert by 97%. In sub-Saharan Africa, it is abundant in marginal habitats where other large cats have disappeared. In southeastern Egypt, an individual was killed by herders in 2014 that was the first sighting of a leopard in this area in 65 years.

In West Asia, the leopard inhabits the areas of southern and southeastern Anatolia. Leopard populations in the Arabian Peninsula are small and fragmented.

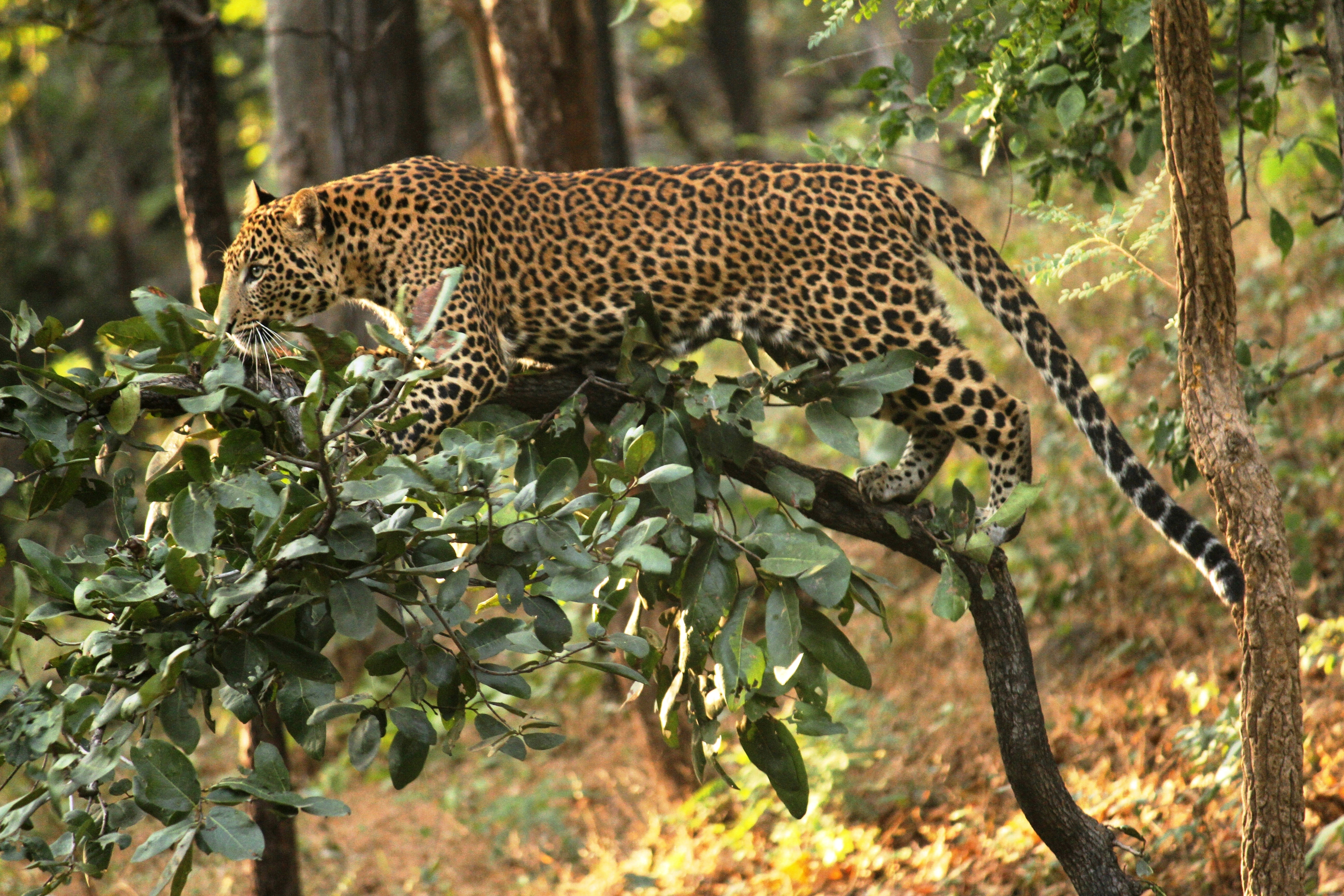
Leopard in a tree in India

In the Indian subcontinent, the leopard is relatively abundant. In Pakistan's Galyat region, 18–24 individuals were estimated in 2017. Leopards abide across the country, with a high population density in a 4,543 km^{2} (1,754 sq mi) tract in northern Pakistan. As of 2020, the leopard population within forested habitats in India's tiger range landscapes was estimated at 12,172 to 13,535 individuals. Surveyed landscapes included elevations below 2,600 m (8,500 ft) in the Shivalik Hills and Gangetic plains, Central India, Western Ghats and Eastern Ghats, the Brahmaputra River basin and hills in northeast India. Some individuals live close to human settlements and in semi-developed areas. Although adaptable to human disturbances, leopards require healthy prey populations and appropriate vegetative hunting cover and thus rarely linger in developed areas. The leopard's stealth allows people to remain unaware that it lives nearby. In Nepal's Kanchenjunga Conservation Area, a melanistic leopard was photographed at an elevation of 4,300 m (14,100 ft) by a camera trap in May 2012.

In Sri Lanka, the leopard was recorded in Yala National Park and in unprotected forest patches, tea estates, grasslands, home gardens, pine and eucalyptus plantations.

In Myanmar, the leopard was recorded for the first time in 2017 by camera traps in the hill forests of Karen State. The Northern Tenasserim Forest Complex in southern Myanmar is a leopard stronghold. In Thailand, leopard is present in the Western Forest Complex, Kaeng Krachan-Kui Buri, Khlong Saeng-Khao Sok protected area complexes and in Hala Bala Wildlife Sanctuary bordering Malaysia. In Peninsular Malaysia, it is present in Belum-Temengor, Taman Negara and Endau-Rompin National Parks. In Laos, it was recorded in Nam Et-Phou Louey National Biodiversity Conservation Area and Nam Kan National Protected Area. In Cambodia, it inhabits deciduous dipterocarp forest in Phnom Prich Wildlife Sanctuary and Mondulkiri Protected Forest. In southern China, it was recorded in the Qinling Mountains during surveys in 11 nature reserves between 2002 and 2009.

In Java, the leopard inhabits dense tropical rainforests and dry deciduous forests at elevations from sea level to 2,540 m (8,330 ft). Outside protected areas, it was were recorded in mixed agricultural land, secondary forest and production forest between 2008 and 2014.

In the Russian Far East, it inhabits temperate coniferous forests where winter temperatures reach a low of −25 °C (−13 °F).

== Behaviour and ecology ==
The leopard is a solitary and territorial animal. It is typically shy and alert when crossing roadways and encountering oncoming vehicles, but may be emboldened to attack people or other animals when threatened. Adults associate only in the mating season. Females continue to interact with their offspring even after weaning and have been observed sharing kills with their offspring when they cannot obtain any prey. They produce a number of vocalizations, including growls and snarls. Cubs call their mother with meows and an urr-urr sound. The most notable vocalization is the 'sawing' roar, which consists of deep, repeated strokes. This likely functions in establishing territories and attracting mates.

The whitish spots on the back of its ears are thought to play a role in communication. It has been hypothesized that the white tips of their tails may function as a 'follow-me' signal in intraspecific communication. However, no significant association were found between a conspicuous colour of tail patches and behavioural variables in carnivores.

Leopards are mainly active from dusk till dawn and will rest for most of the day and some hours at night in thickets, among rocks or over tree branches. Leopards have been observed walking up to 25 km (16 mi) across their range at night; wandering up to 75 km (47 mi) if disturbed. In western African forests, they have been observed to be largely diurnal and hunting during twilight, when their prey animals are active; activity patterns vary between seasons.

Leopards can climb trees quite skillfully, often resting on tree branches and descending headfirst. They can run at over 58 km/h (36 mph; 16 m/s), leap over 6 m (20 ft) horizontally, and jump up to 3 m (9.8 ft) vertically.

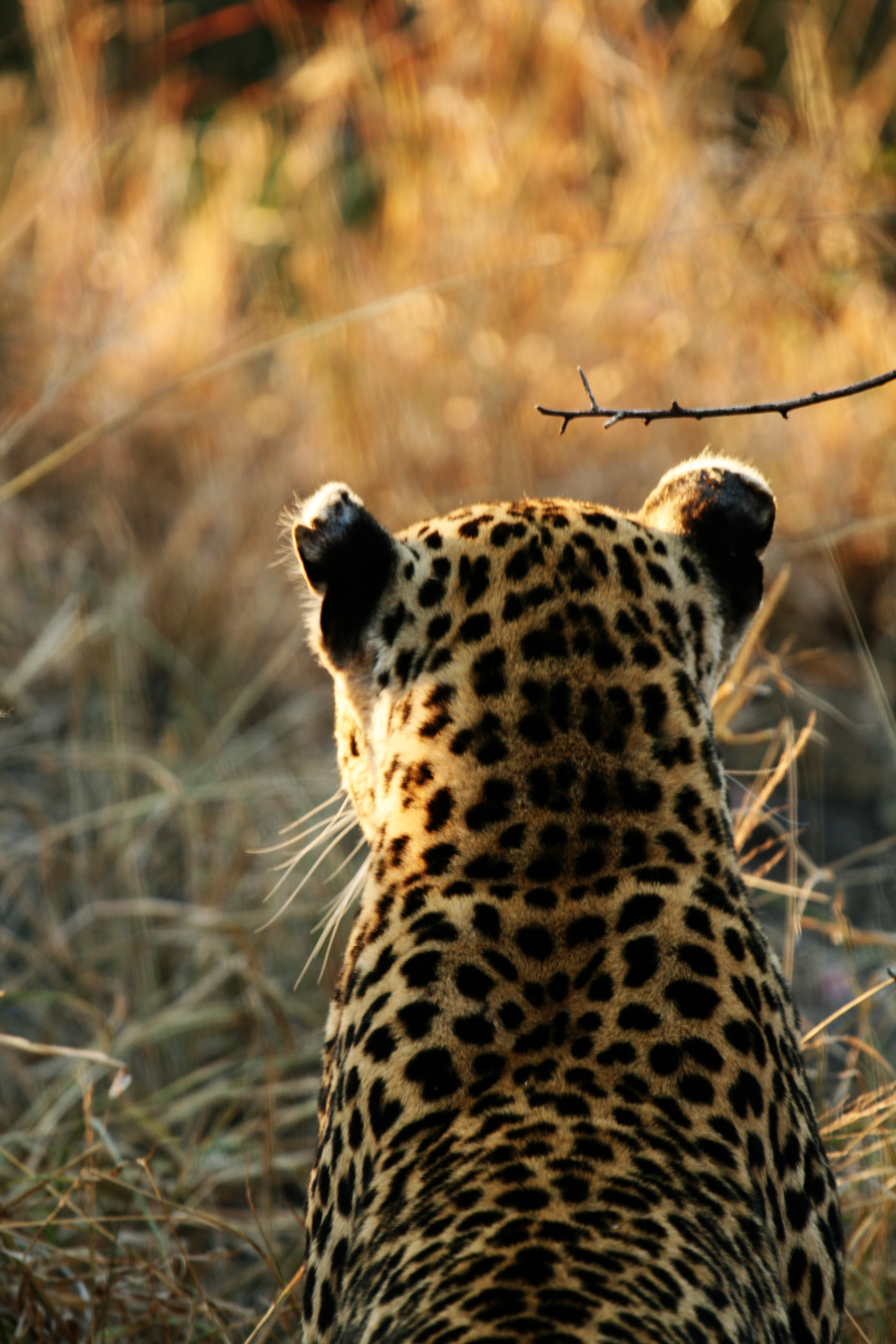
A female leopard with white markings on the backs of her ears

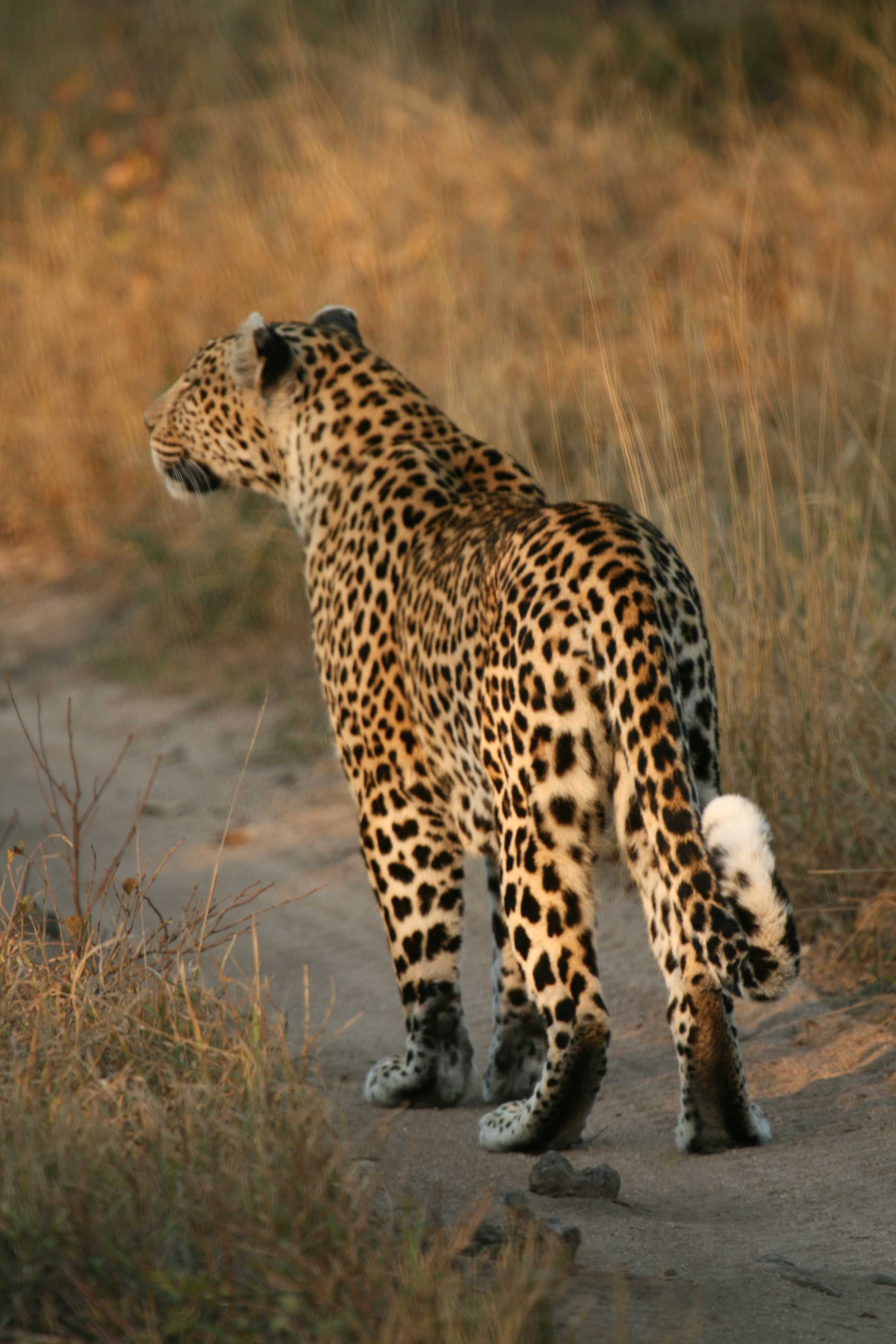
A female leopard showing white spots on the tail

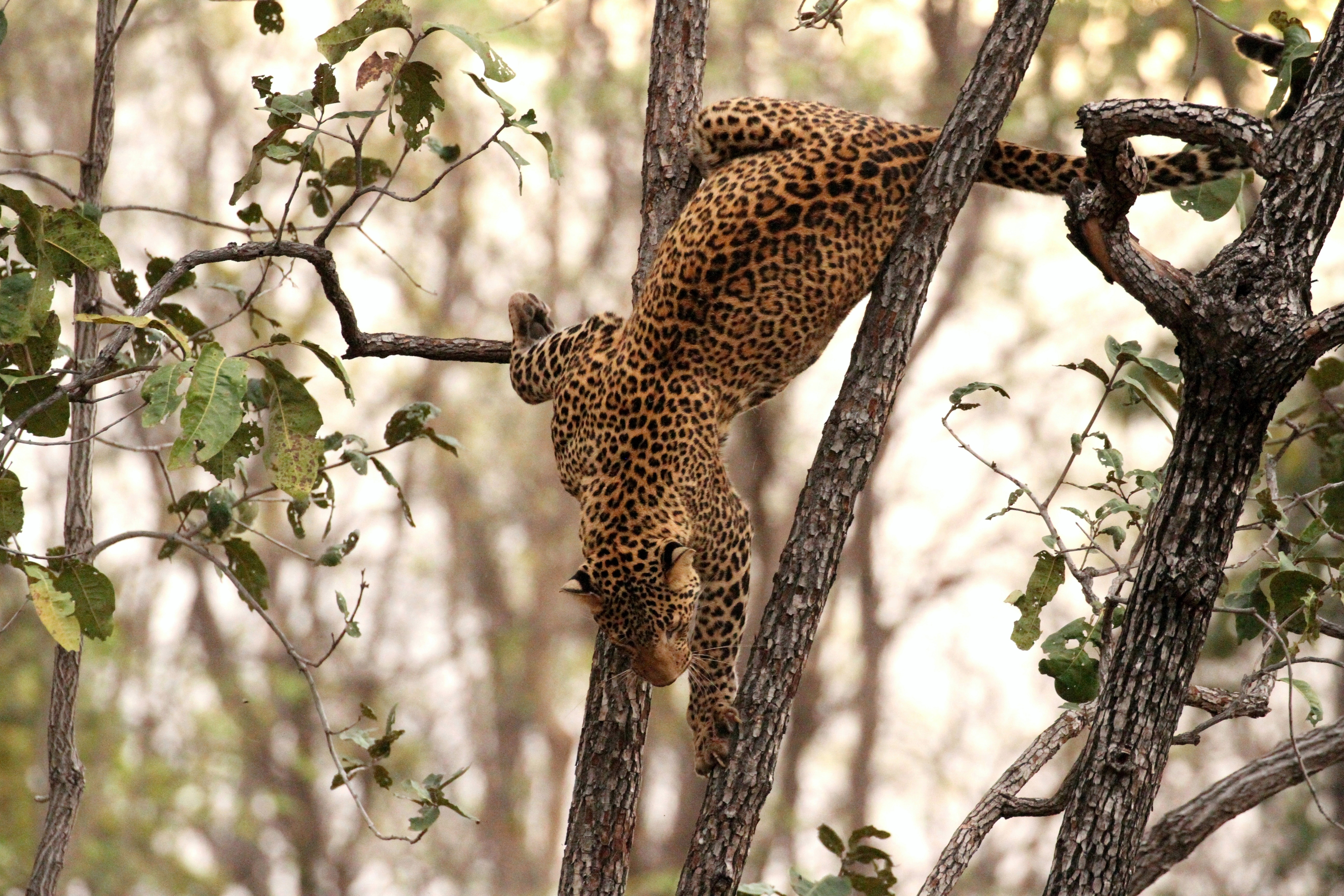
A leopard climbing down a tree

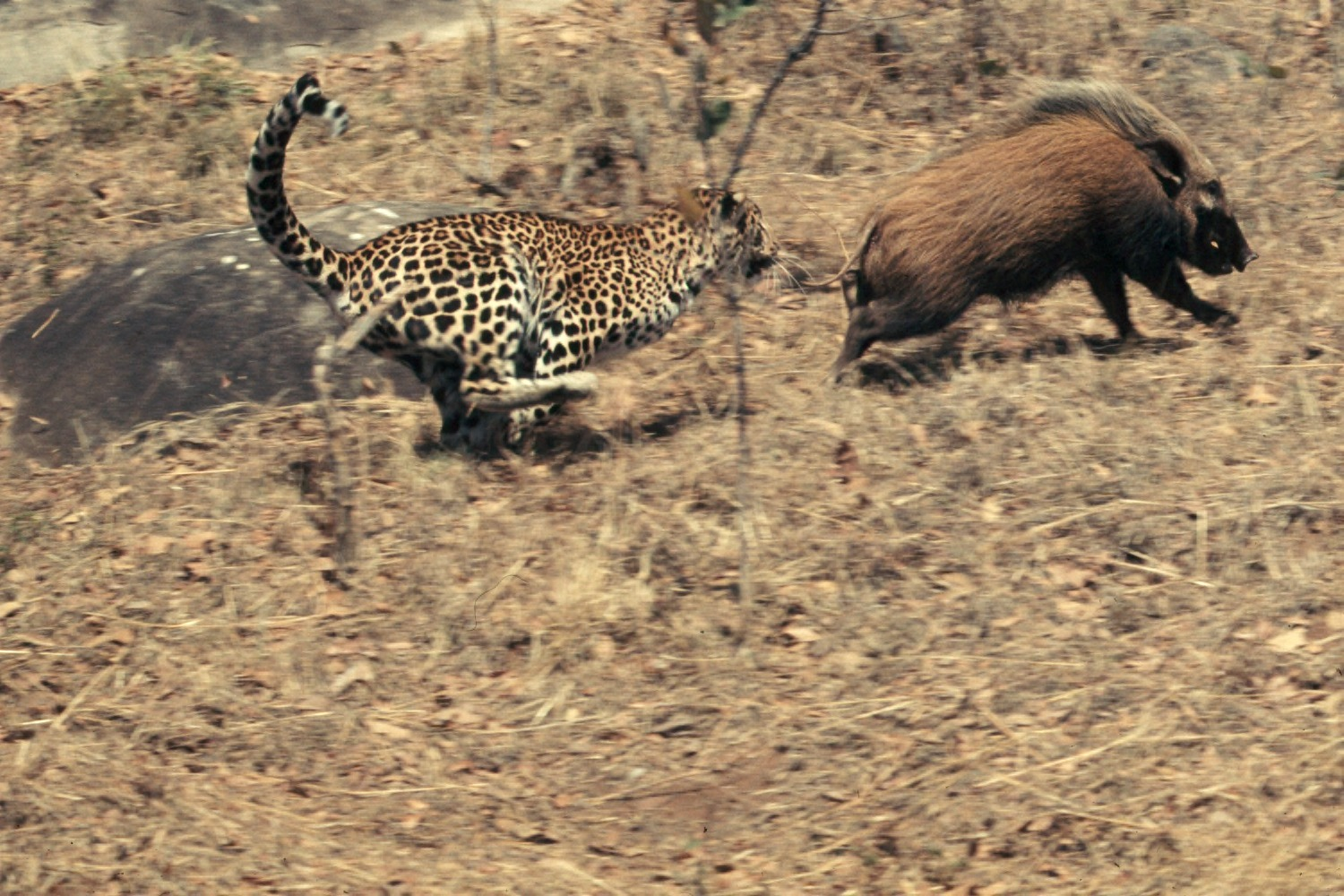
A leopard hunting a bushpig

=== Social spacing ===
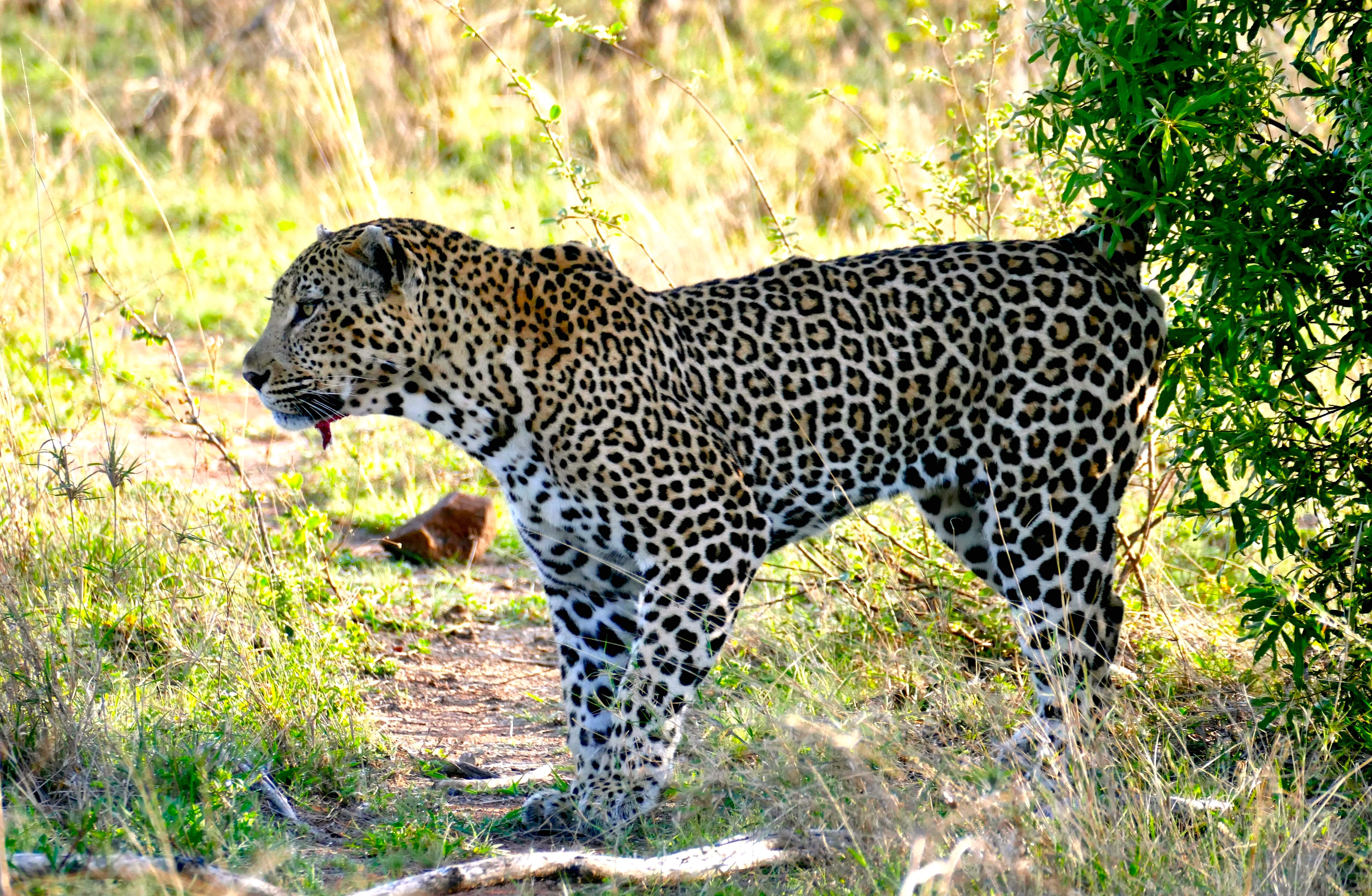
A male leopard scent-marking his territory

In Kruger National Park, most leopards tend to keep 1 km (0.62 mi) apart. Males occasionally interact with their partners and cubs, and exceptionally this can extend beyond to two generations. Aggressive encounters are rare, typically limited to defending territories from intruders. In a South African reserve, a male was wounded in a male–male territorial battle over a carcass.

Males occupy home ranges that often overlap with a few smaller female home ranges, probably as a strategy to enhance access to females. In the Ivory Coast, the home range of a female was completely enclosed within a male's. Females live with their cubs in home ranges that overlap extensively, probably due to the association between mothers and their offspring. There may be a few other fluctuating home ranges belonging to young individuals. It is not clear if male home ranges overlap as much as those of females do. Individuals try to drive away intruders of the same sex.

A study of leopards in the Namibian farmlands showed that the size of home ranges was not significantly affected by sex, rainfall patterns or season; the higher the prey availability in an area, the greater the leopard population density and the smaller the size of home ranges, but they tend to expand if there is human interference. Sizes of home ranges vary geographically and depending on habitat and availability of prey. In the Serengeti, males have home ranges of 33–38 km^{2} (13–15 sq mi) and females of 14–16 km^{2} (5.4–6.2 sq mi); but males in northeastern Namibia of 451 km^{2} (174 sq mi) and females of 188 km^{2} (73 sq mi). They are even larger in arid and montane areas. In Nepal's Bardia National Park, male home ranges of 48 km^{2} (19 sq mi) and female ones of 5–7 km^{2} (1.9–2.7 sq mi) are smaller than those generally observed in Africa.

=== Hunting and diet ===
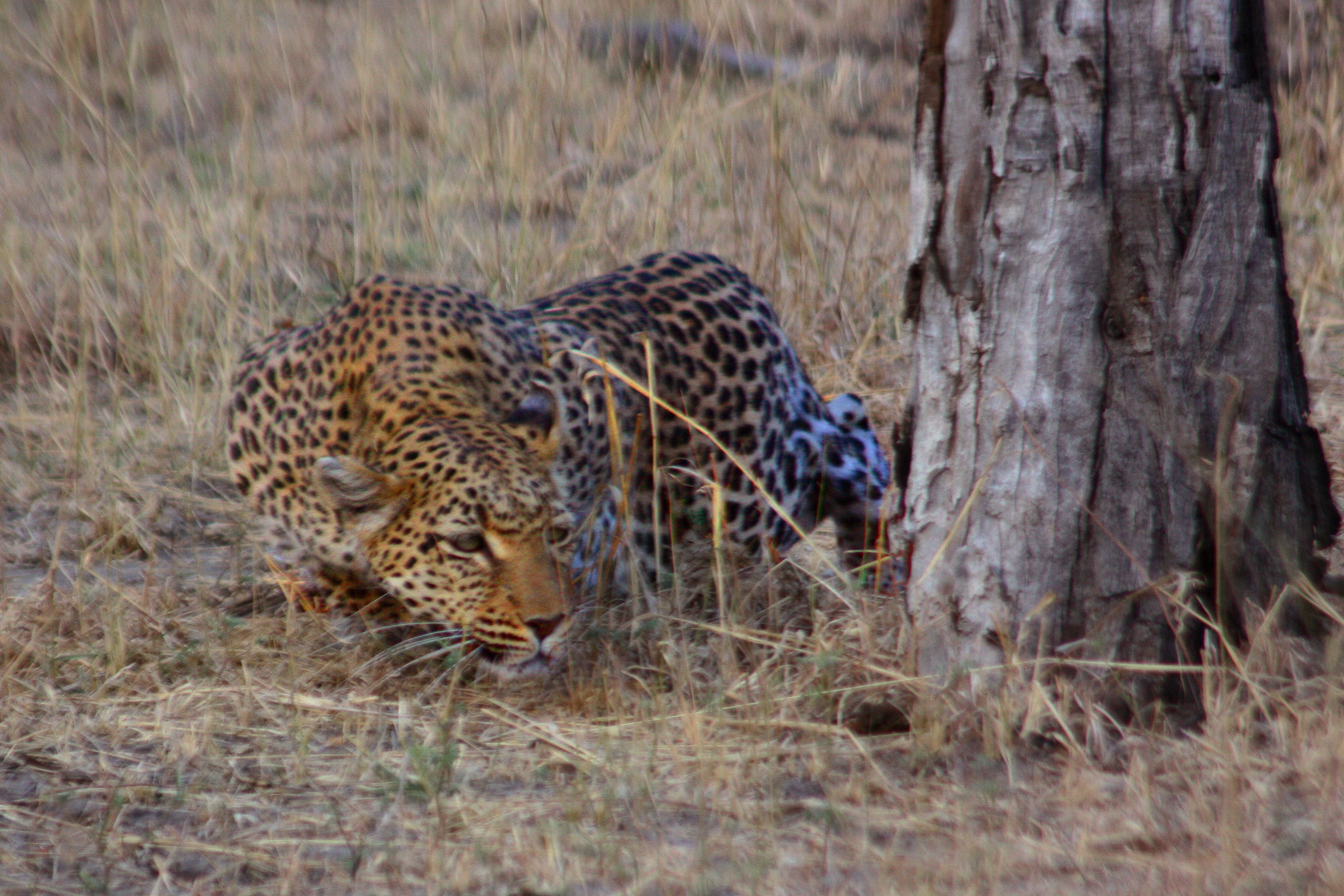
Leopard stalking

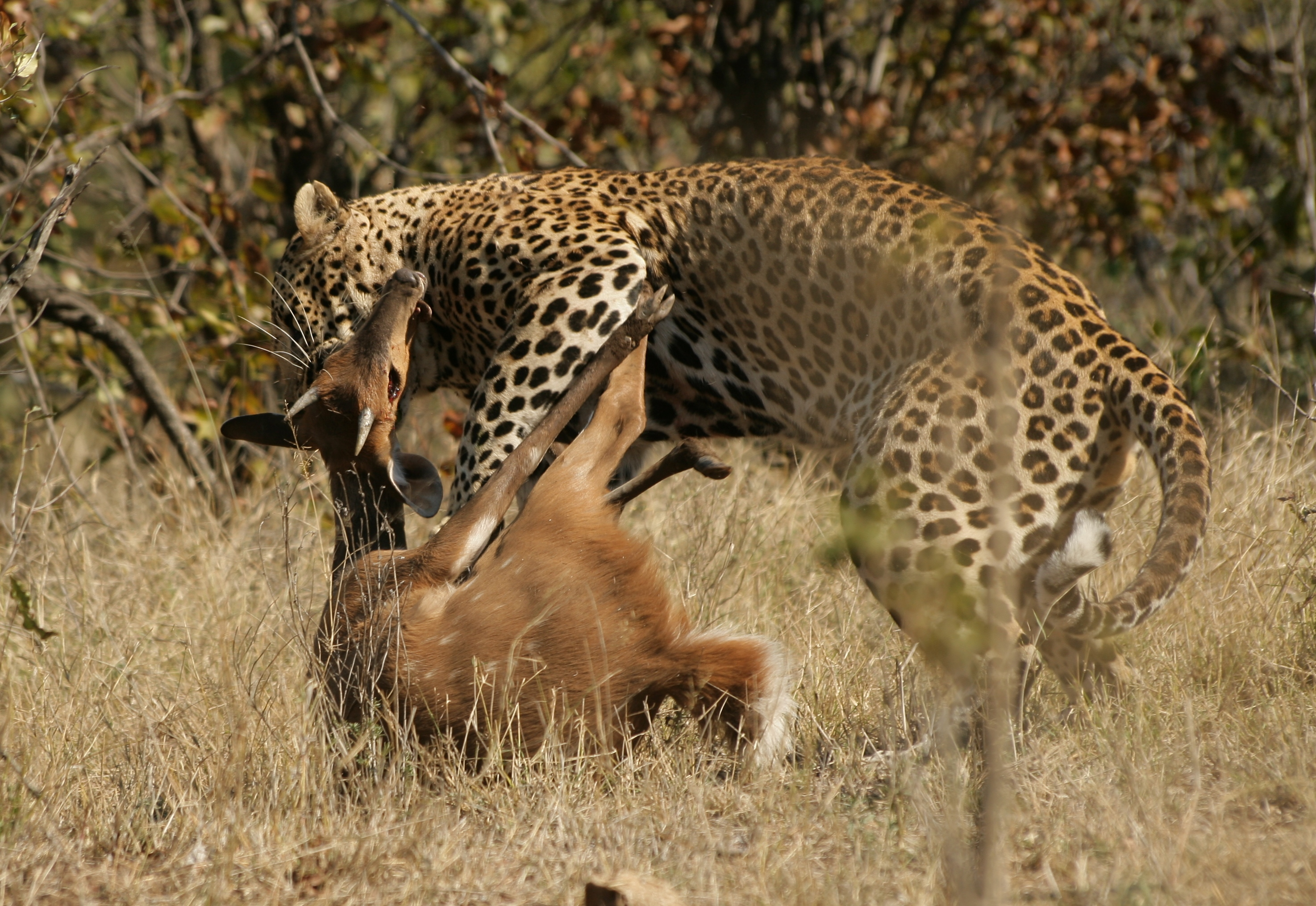
Leopard applying a throat bite to a bushbuck

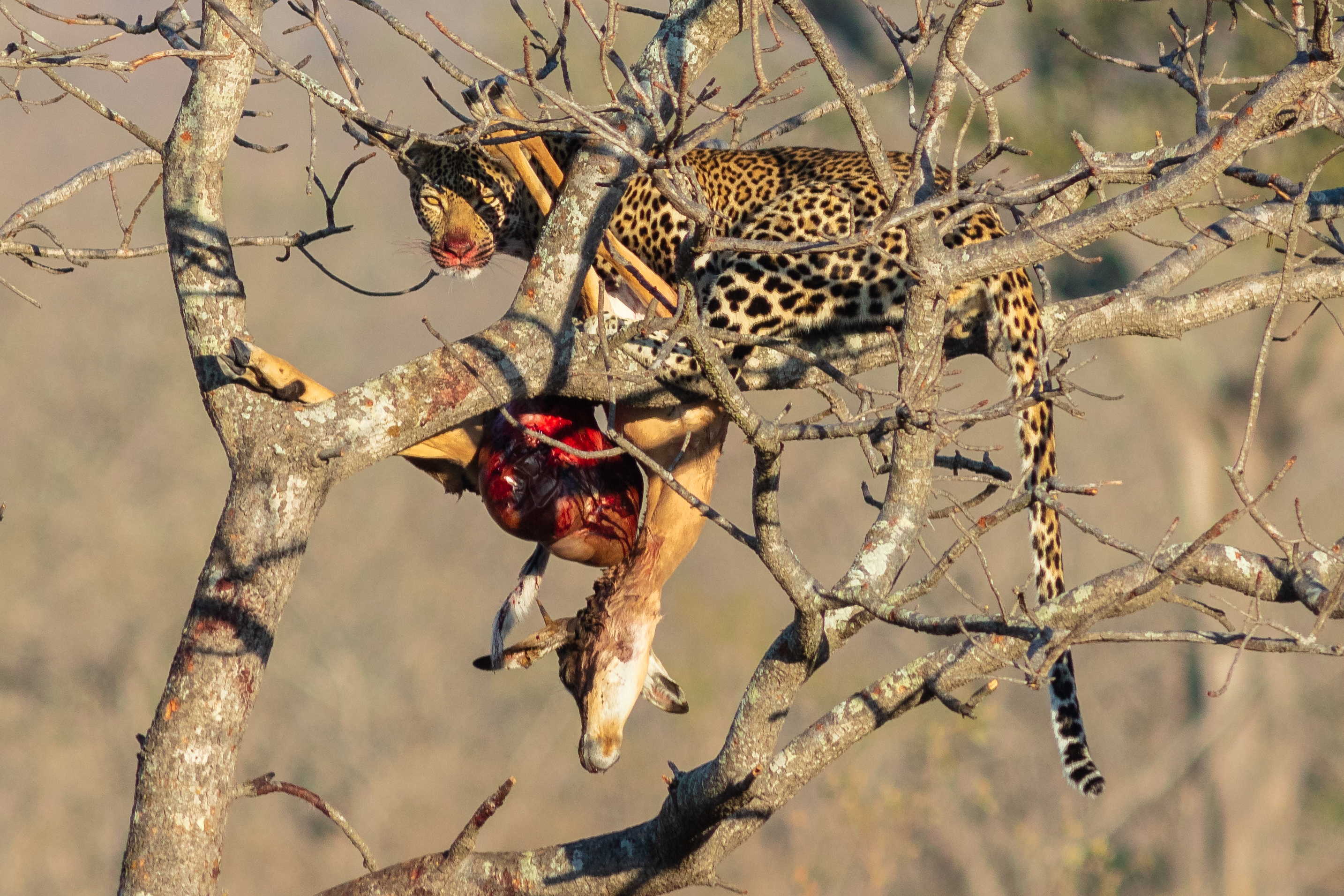
Leopard caches a kill in a tree

The leopard is a carnivore that prefers medium-sized prey with a body mass ranging from 10–40 kg (22–88 lb). Prey species in this weight range tend to occur in dense habitat and to form small herds. Species that prefer open areas and have well-developed anti-predator strategies are less preferred. More than 100 prey species have been recorded. The most preferred species are hooved mammals, such as impala, bushbuck, common duiker and chital. Primates preyed upon include white-eyelid mangabeys, guenons and grey langurs. Leopards also kill smaller carnivores like black-backed jackal, bat-eared fox, genet and cheetah. In urban environments, domestic dogs provide an important food source. The largest prey killed by a leopard was reportedly a male eland weighing 900 kg (2,000 lb). A study in Wolong National Nature Reserve in southern China demonstrated variation in the leopard's diet over time; over the course of seven years, the vegetative cover receded, and leopards opportunistically shifted from primarily consuming tufted deer to pursuing bamboo rats and other smaller prey.

The leopard depends mainly on its acute senses of hearing and vision for hunting. It primarily hunts at night in most areas. In western African forests and Tsavo National Park, they have also been observed hunting by day. They usually hunt on the ground. In the Serengeti, they have been seen to ambush prey by descending on it from trees. It stalks its prey and tries to approach as closely as possible, typically within 5 m (16 ft) of the target, and, finally, pounces on it and kills it by suffocation. It kills small prey with a bite to the back of the neck, but holds larger animals by the throat and strangles them. It caches kills up to 2 km (1.2 mi) apart. It is able to take large prey due to its powerful jaw muscles, and is therefore strong enough to drag carcasses heavier than itself up into trees; an individual was seen to haul a young giraffe weighing nearly 125 kg (276 lb) up 5.7 m (18 ft 8 in) into a tree. It eats small prey immediately, but drags larger carcasses over several hundred metres and caches it safely in trees, bushes or even caves; this behaviour allows the leopard to store its prey away from rivals, and offers it an advantage over them. The way it stores the kill depends on local topography and individual preferences, varying from trees in Kruger National Park to bushes in the plain terrain of the Kalahari. Before their extirpation from Europe, leopards there cached their meat in caves, as evidenced by fossilised bone accumulations in caves such as Los Rincones in the Province of Zaragoza, Spain.

Leopards are known to drop from trees onto Impalas, which is probably an opportunistic hunting behaviour. A leopard falling from a height of 2.69 metres onto the back of its prey (3.55 metres total height), takes 0.7 seconds to fall and reaches a terminal velocity of 25 km/h; this hunting technique requires that the prey be unaware of the predator's attack and it also requires great precision to avoid falling on the horns of males, which allows for a safe attack.

Average daily consumption rates of 3.5 kg (7 lb 11 oz) were estimated for males and of 2.8 kg (6 lb 3 oz) for females. In the southern Kalahari Desert, leopards meet their water requirements by the bodily fluids of prey and succulent plants; they drink water every two to three days and feed infrequently on moisture-rich plants such as gemsbok cucumbers, watermelon and Kalahari sour grass.

It has been reported that leopards lose 5–10% of their kills to other predators in the Serengeti.

=== Enemies and competitors ===
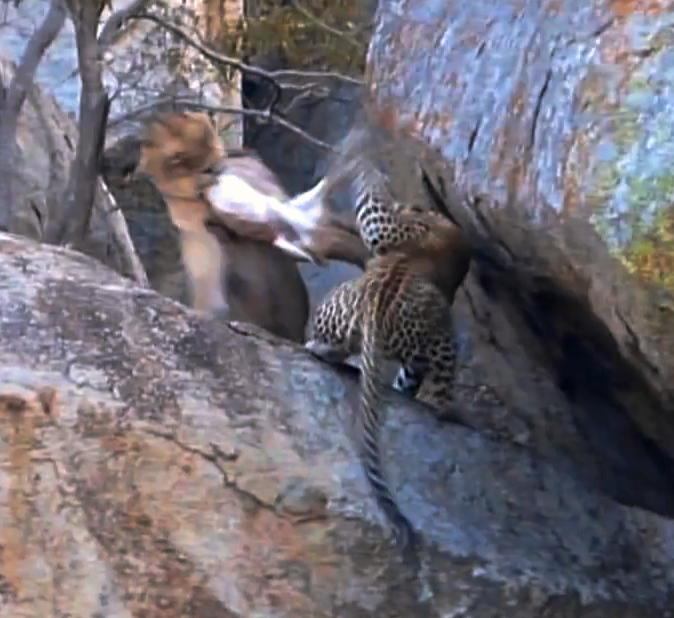
A lioness steals a leopard kill in Kruger National Park

Across its range, the leopard coexists with a number of other large predators. In Africa, it is part of a large predator guild with lions, cheetahs, spotted and brown hyenas, and African wild dogs. The leopard is dominant only over the cheetah while the others have the advantage of size, pack numbers or both. Lions pose a great mortal threat and can be responsible for 22% of leopard deaths in Sabi Sand Game Reserve. Spotted hyenas are less threatening but are more likely to steal kills, being the culprits of up to 50% of stolen leopard kills in the same area. To counter this, leopards store their kills in the trees and out of reach. Lions have a high success rate in fetching leopard kills from trees. Leopards do not seem to actively avoid their competitors but rather difference in prey and habitat preferences appear to limit their spatial overlap. In particular, leopards use heavy vegetation regardless of whether lions are present in an area and both cats are active at the same time of day.

In Asia, the leopard's main competitors are tigers and dholes. Both the larger tiger and pack-living dhole dominate leopards during encounters. Interactions between the three predators involve chasing, stealing kills and direct killing. Tigers appear to inhabit the deep parts of the forest while leopards and dholes are pushed closer to the fringes. The three predators coexist by hunting different sized prey. In Nagarhole National Park, the average size for a leopard kill was 37.6 kg (83 lb) compared to 91.5 kg (202 lb) for tigers and 43.4 kg (96 lb) for dholes. At Kui Buri National Park, following a reduction in prey numbers, tigers continued to feed on favoured prey while leopards and dholes had to increase their consumption of small prey. Leopards can live successfully in tiger habitat when there is abundant food and vegetation cover. Otherwise, they appear to be less common where tigers are numerous. The recovery of the tiger population in Rajaji National Park during the 2000s led to a reduction in leopard population densities.

=== Reproduction and life cycle ===
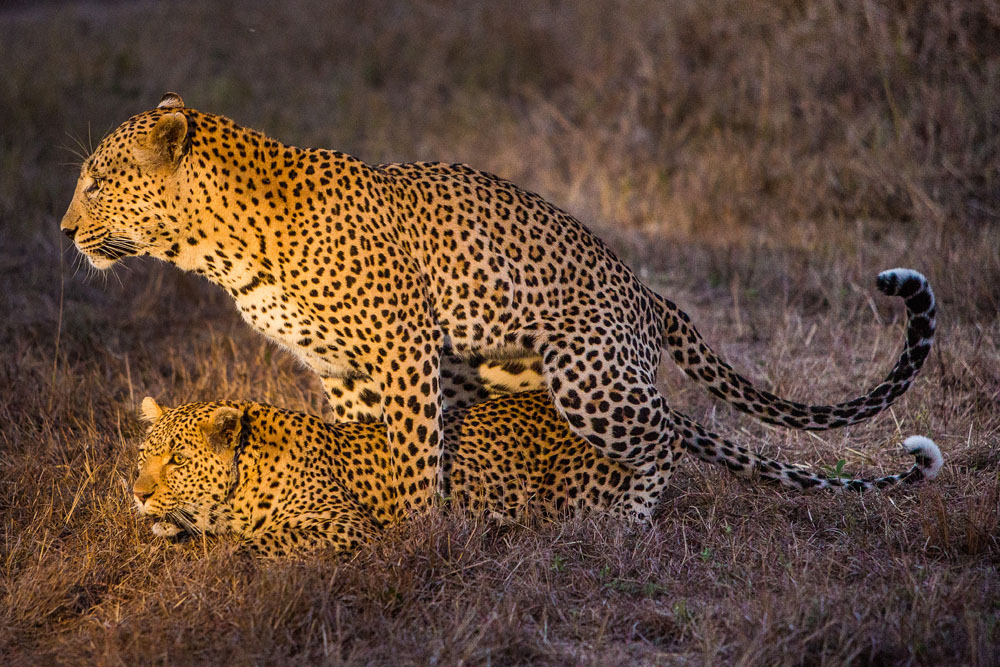
Leopards mating

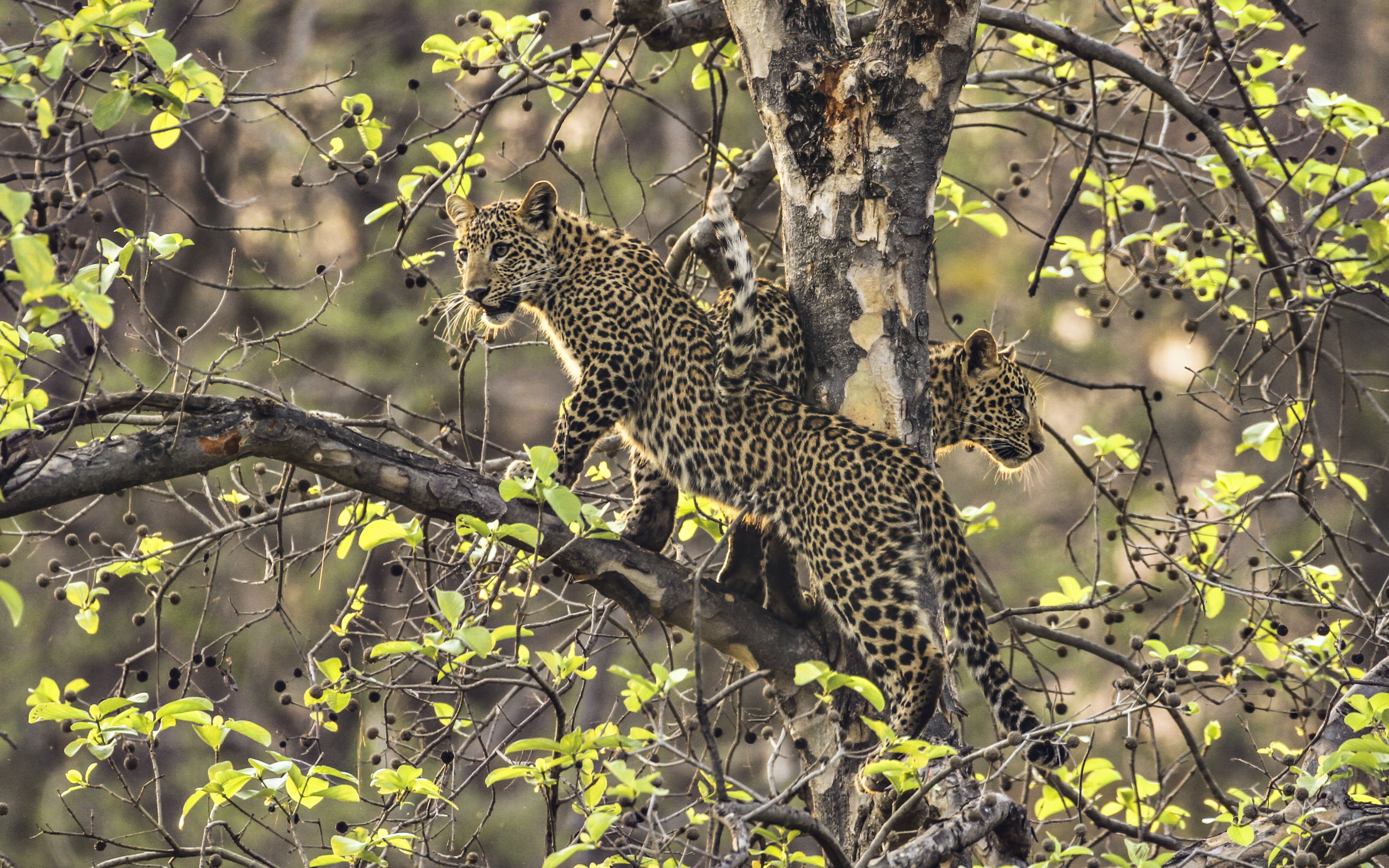
Leopard cubs in tree

In some areas, leopards mate all year round. In Manchuria and Siberia, they mate during January and February. On average, females begin to breed between the ages of 2½ and three, and males between the ages of two and three. The female's estrous cycle lasts about 46 days, and she is usually in heat for 6–7 days. Gestation lasts for 90 to 105 days. Cubs are usually born in a litter of 2–4 cubs. The mortality rate of cubs is estimated at 41–50% during the first year. Predators are the biggest cause for leopard cub mortality during their first year. Male leopards are known to cause infanticide, in order to bring the female back into heat. Intervals between births average 15 to 24 months, but can be shorter, depending on the survival of the cubs.

Females give birth in a cave, crevice among boulders, hollow tree or thicket. Newborn cubs weigh 280–1,000 g (9.9–35.3 oz), and are born with closed eyes, which open four to nine days after birth. The fur of the young tends to be longer and thicker than that of adults. Their pelage is also more grey in colour with less defined spots. They begin to eat meat at around nine weeks. Around three months of age, the young begin to follow the mother on hunts. At one year of age, cubs can probably fend for themselves, but will remain with the mother for 18–24 months. After separating from their mother, sibling cubs may travel together for months. Both male and female leopards typically reach sexual maturity at 2–2⅓ years.

The generation length of the leopard is 9.3 years. The average life span of a leopard is 12–17 years. The oldest leopard was a captive female that died at the age of 24 years, 2 months and 13 days.

== Conservation ==
The leopard is listed on CITES Appendix I, and hunting is banned in Botswana and Afghanistan; in 11 sub-Saharan countries, trade is restricted to skins and body parts of 2,560 individuals. In 2007, a leopard reintroduction programme was initiated in the Russian Caucasus, where captive bred individuals are reared and trained in 0.5–0.9 ha (1.2–2.2 acres) large enclosures in Sochi National Park; six individuals released into Caucasus Nature Reserve and Alaniya National Park in 2018 survived as of February 2022.

=== Threats ===
The leopard is primarily threatened by habitat fragmentation and conversion of forest to agriculturally used land, which lead to a declining natural prey base, human–wildlife conflict with livestock herders and high leopard mortality rates. It is also threatened by trophy hunting and poaching. Contemporary records suggest that the leopard occurs in only 25% of its historical range.

Between 2002 and 2012, at least four leopards were estimated to have been poached per week in India for the illegal wildlife trade of its skins and bones. In spring 2013, 37 leopard skins were found during a 7-week long market survey in major Moroccan cities. In 2014, 43 leopard skins were detected during two surveys in Morocco. Vendors admitted to have imported skins from sub-Saharan Africa.

Surveys in the Central African Republic's Chinko area revealed that the leopard population decreased from 97 individuals in 2012 to 50 individuals in 2017. In this period, transhumant pastoralists from the border area with Sudan moved in the area with their livestock. Rangers confiscated large amounts of poison in the camps of livestock herders who were accompanied by armed merchants. They engaged in poaching large herbivores, sale of bushmeat and trading leopard skins in Am Dafok.

In Java, the leopard is threatened by illegal hunting and trade. Between 2011 and 2019, body parts of 51 Javan leopards were seized including six live individuals, 12 skins, 13 skulls, 20 canines and 22 claws.

== Human relations ==
=== Cultural significance ===
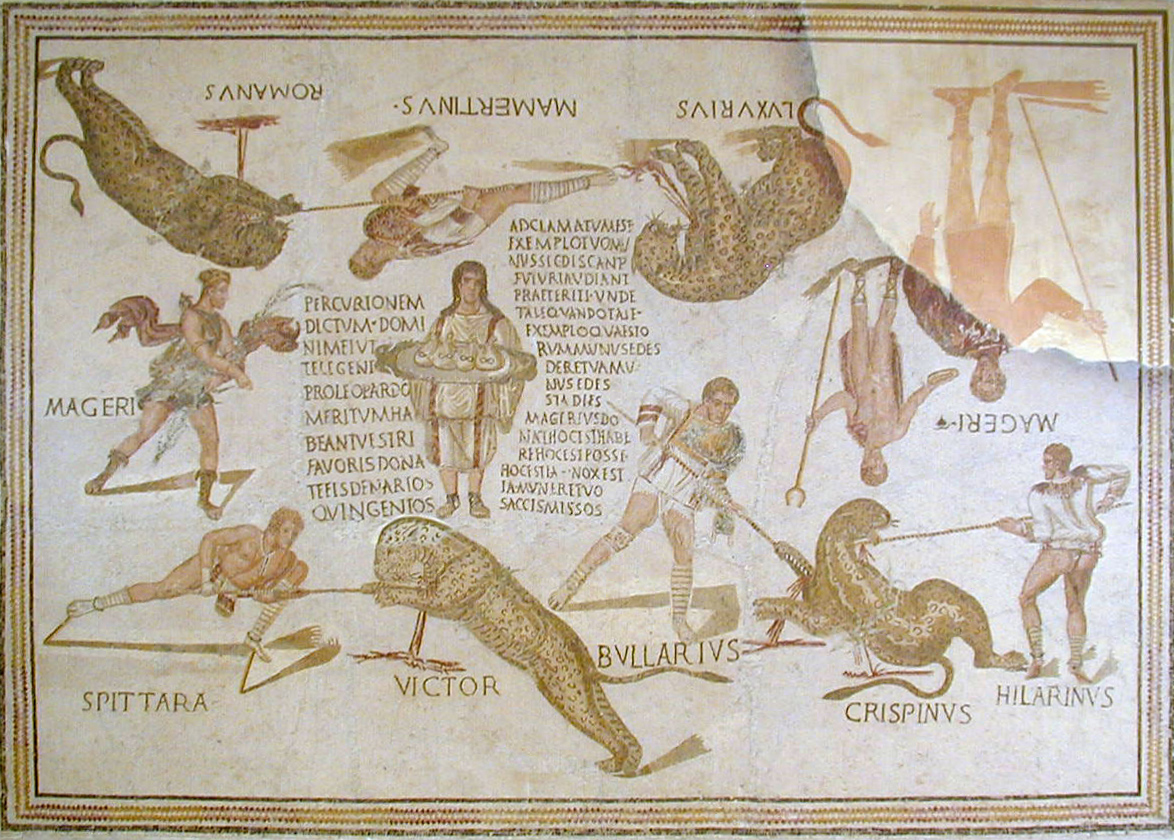
Leopards on the Magerius Mosaic from modern Tunisia

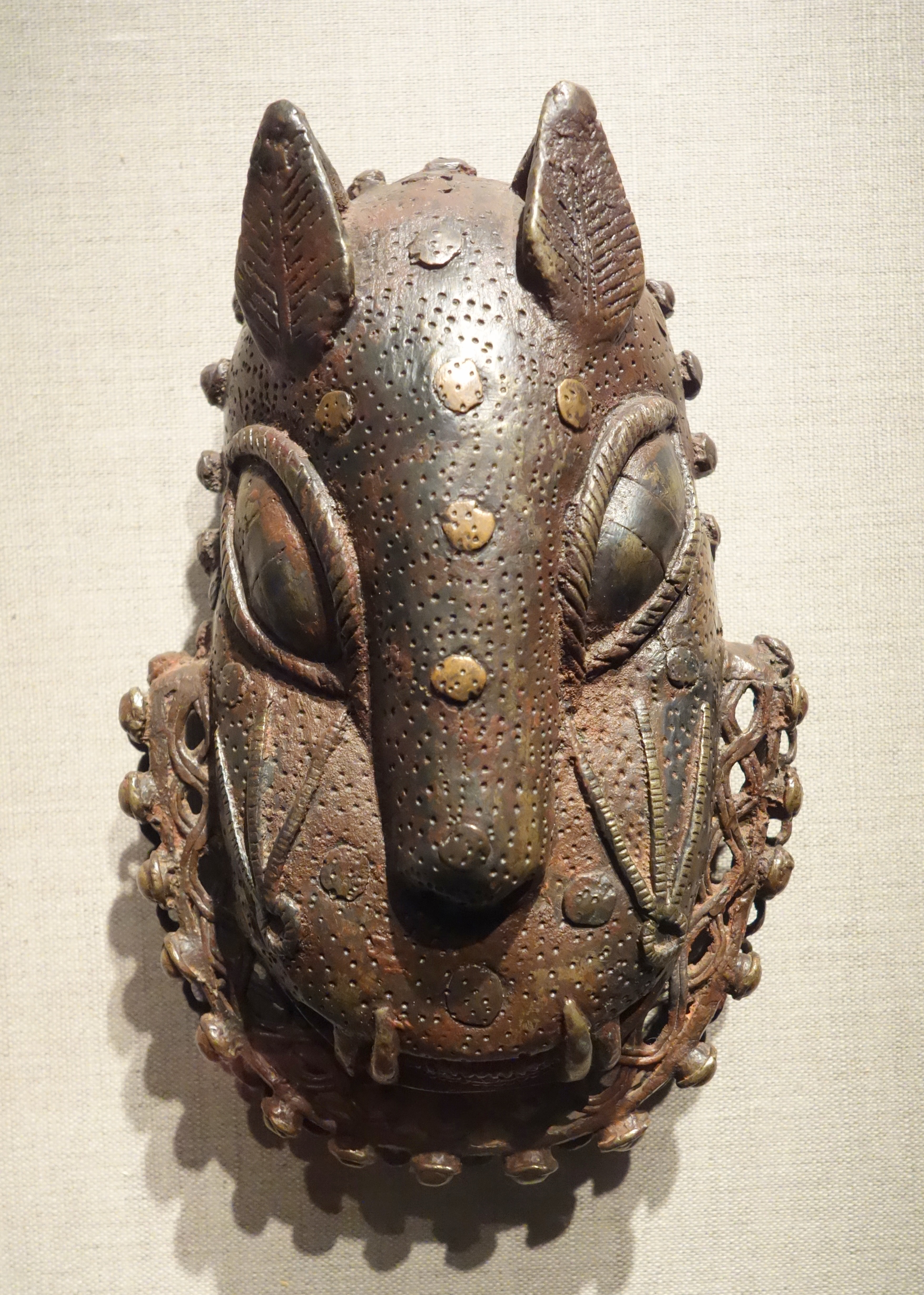
Leopard head ornament from the Court of Benin

Leopards have been featured in art, mythology and folklore of many countries. In Greek mythology, it was a symbol of the god Dionysus, who was depicted wearing leopard skin and using leopards as means of transportation. In one myth, the god was captured by pirates but two leopards rescued him. Numerous Roman mosaics from North African sites depict fauna now found only in tropical Africa. During the Benin Empire, the leopard was commonly represented on engravings and sculptures and was used to symbolise the power of the king or oba, since the leopard was considered the king of the forest. The Ashanti people also used the leopard as a symbol of leadership, and only the king was permitted to have a ceremonial leopard stool. Some African cultures considered the leopard to be a smarter, better hunter than the lion and harder to kill.

In Rudyard Kipling's "How the Leopard Got His Spots", one of his Just So Stories, a leopard with no spots in the Highveld lives with his hunting partner, the Ethiopian. When they set off to the forest, the Ethiopian changed his brown skin, and the leopard painted spots on his skin. A leopard played an important role in the 1938 Hollywood film Bringing Up Baby. African chiefs, European queens, Hollywood actors and burlesque dancers wore coats made of leopard skins.

The leopard is a frequently used motif in heraldry, most commonly as passant. The heraldic leopard lacks spots and sports a mane, making it visually almost identical to the heraldic lion, and the two are often used interchangeably. Naturalistic leopard-like depictions appear on the coat of arms of Benin, Malawi, Somalia, the Democratic Republic of the Congo and Gabon, the last of which uses a black panther.

=== Attacks on people ===
The Leopard of Rudraprayag killed more than 125 people; the Panar Leopard was thought to have killed over 400 people. Both were shot by British hunter Jim Corbett. The Spotted Devil of Gummalapur killed about 42 people in Karnataka, India.

=== In captivity ===
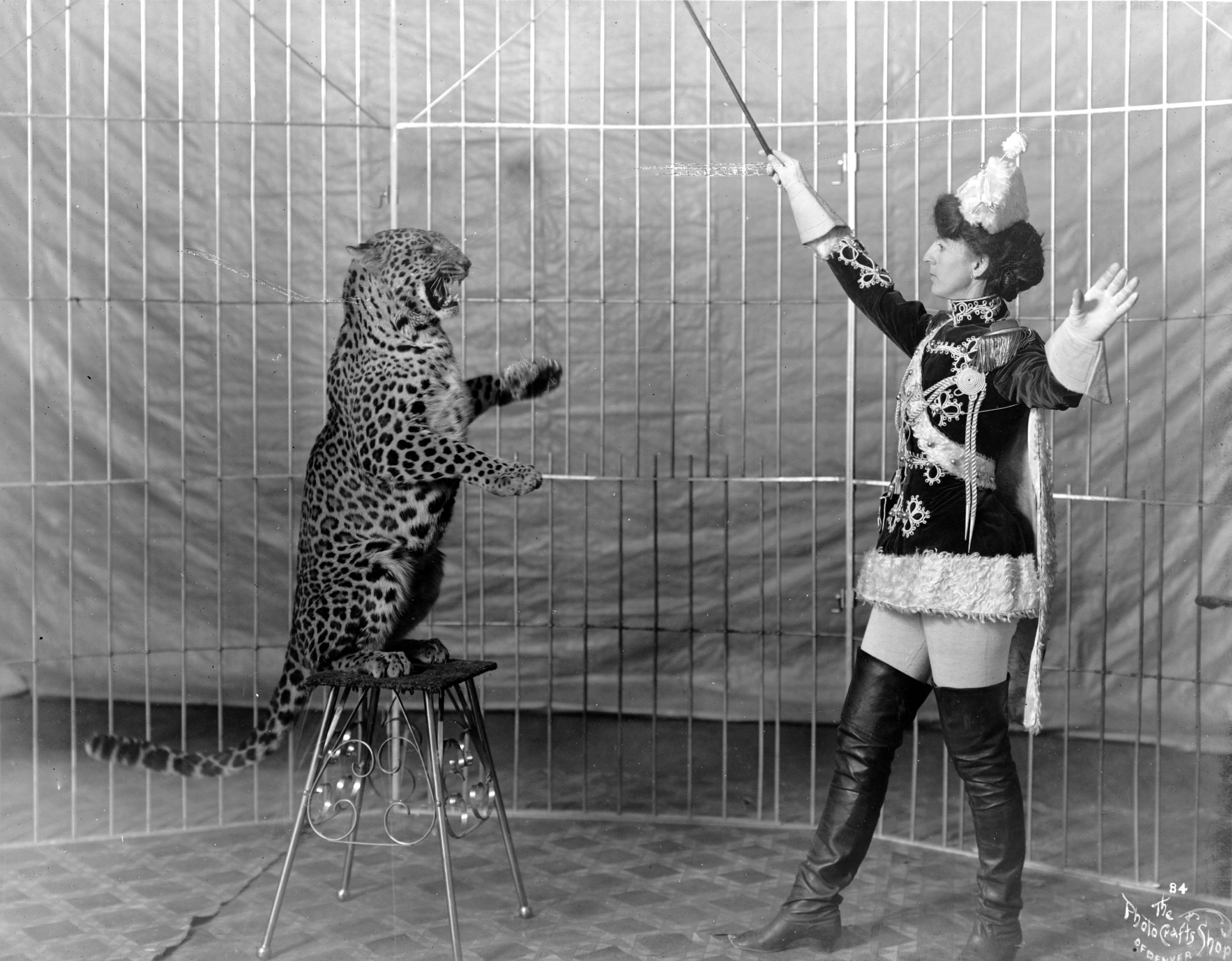
Animal trainer with leopard

The ancient Romans kept leopards in captivity to be slaughtered in hunts as well as execute criminals. In Benin, leopards were kept and paraded as mascots, totems and sacrifices to deities. Several leopards were kept in a menagerie originally established by King John of England at the Tower of London in the 13th century; around 1235, three of these animals were given to Henry III by Holy Roman Emperor Frederick II. In modern times, leopards have been trained and tamed in circuses.

== See also ==
- Leopard pattern
- List of largest cats
- Panther (legendary creature)
