= 1903 in science =

The year 1903 in science and technology involved some significant events, listed below.

== Aeronautics ==
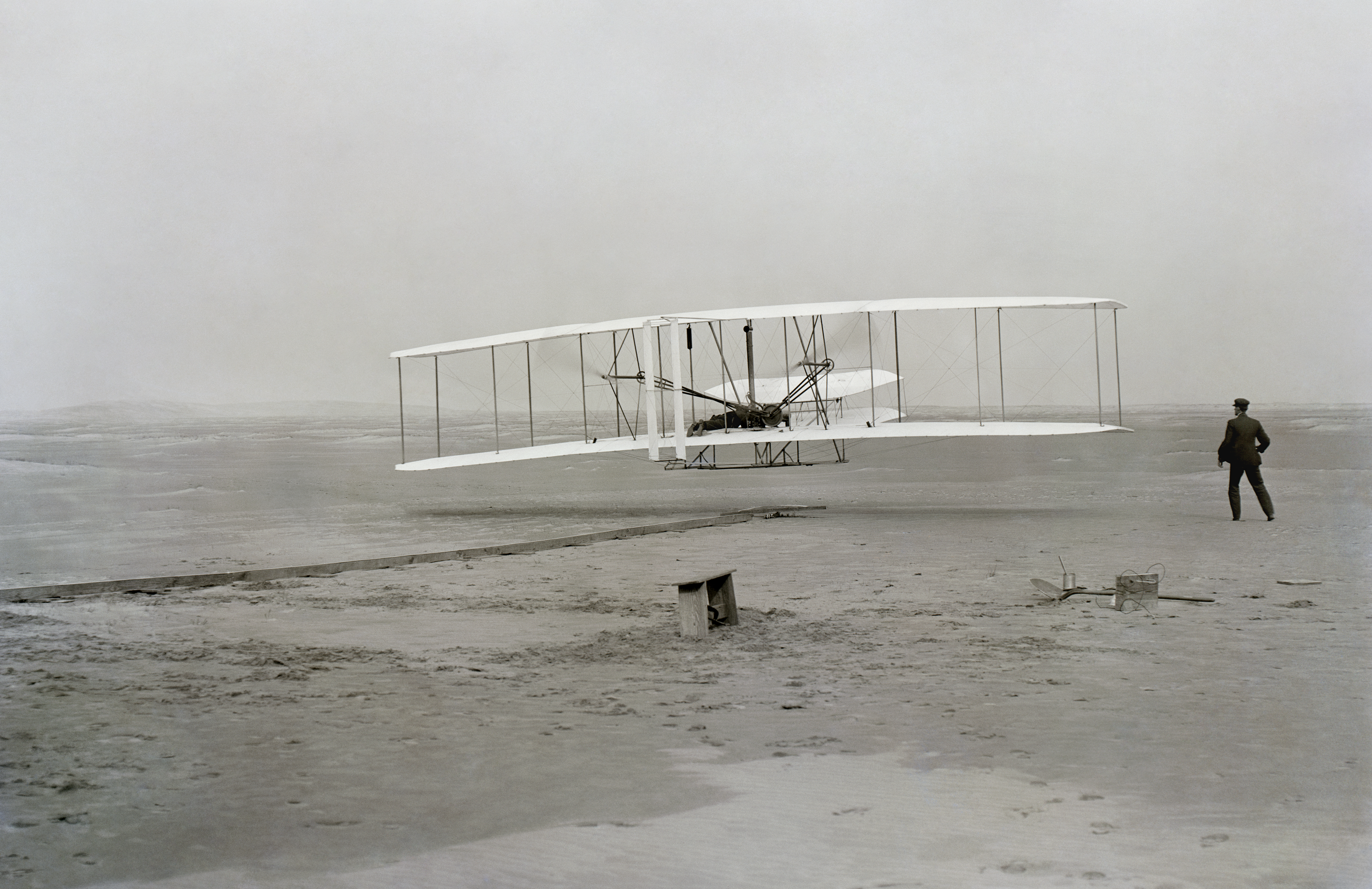
December 17 – Wright brothers' first flight

- June 27–19-year-old American socialite Aida de Acosta becomes the first woman to fly a powered aircraft solo when she pilots Santos-Dumont's motorized dirigible, "No. 9", from Paris to Château de Bagatelle in France.
- December 17 – First documented, successful, controlled, powered flight of a heavier-than-air aircraft with a petrol engine by Orville Wright in the Wright Flyer at Kill Devil Hills, North Carolina.
- Konstantin Tsiolkovsky begins a series of papers discussing the use of liquid fuel rockets to reach outer space, space suits, and colonization of the Solar System.

== Biology ==
- The type specimen of the vampire squid (Vampyroteuthis infernalis) is described by Carl Chun.
- Fauna and Flora International is founded as the Society for the Preservation of the Wild Fauna of the Empire by a group of British naturalists and American statesmen in Africa.

== Chemistry ==
- Peter Cooper Hewitt demonstrates the mercury-vapour lamp.
- Mikhail Semyonovich Tsvet invents chromatography, an important analytic technique.
- The International Committee of Atomic Weights publishes the inaugural atomic weights report.

== Mathematics ==
- October – Frank Nelson Cole demonstrates that the Mersenne number 2^{67}-1, or M_{67}, is composite by factoring it as 193,707,721 * 761,838,257,287.
- Fast Fourier transform algorithm presented by Carle David Tolmé Runge.
- Edmund Georg Hermann Landau gives considerably simpler proof of the prime number theorem.

== Physics ==
- George Darwin and John Joly claim that radioactivity is partially responsible for the Earth's heat.
- Prosper-René Blondlot claims to have detected N rays.

== Physiology and medicine ==
- March–April – David Bruce identifies the parasitic Trypanosoma protist as the source of African trypanosomiasis ("sleeping sickness").
- May 10 – Antoni Leśniowski publishes the first article implicating what will later be known as Crohn's disease, in the Polish weekly medical newspaper Medycyna.
- Alfred Walter Campbell divides the cytoarchitecture of the human brain into 14 areas.
- Ernest Fourneau synthesizes and patents Amylocaine, the first synthetic local anesthetic, under the name Stovaine at the Pasteur Institute.
- Willem Einthoven discovers electrocardiography (ECG/EKG)
- Percy Furnivall carries out the first known case of cardiac surgery in Britain.
- The 12th and final edition of Dr Richard von Krafft-Ebing's Psychopathia Sexualis: eine Klinisch-Forensische Studie ("Sexual Psychopathy: a Clinical-Forensic Study") published during the author's lifetime introduces the term paedophilia erotica.
- Formal opening of the Johnston Laboratories at the University of Liverpool, Liverpool, England.

== Technology ==
- November – Windscreen wiper for automobiles is first patented by Mary Anderson in the United States.
- December 15 – Italo Marchiony from New York City patents an improved design of apparatus for baking ice cream cones.
- The first diesel-powered ships are launched, both for inland waters: Petite-Pierre in France, powered by Dyckhoff-built diesels, and the tanker Vandal in Russia, powered by Swedish-built diesels with an electrical transmission.
- Norwegian engineer Ægidius Elling builds the first gas turbine to generate power, using a centrifugal compressor.
- Laminated glass is invented by Edouard Benedictus.
- Baker valve gear for steam locomotives is first patented in the United States.
- The Lune Valley boiler is patented by John G. A. Kitchen and Ludlow Perkins.

== Institutions ==
- June 28 – Deutsches Museum founded in Munich.

== Awards ==
- Nobel Prizes
  - Physics – Antoine Henri Becquerel, Pierre Curie, and Marie Curie
  - Chemistry – Svante August Arrhenius
  - Medicine – Niels Ryberg Finsen

== Births ==
- January 22 – Fritz Houtermans (died 1966), Danzig-born Dutch physicist.
- January 27 – John Eccles (died 1997), Australian-born psychologist.
- January 28 – Kathleen Lonsdale, née Yardley (died 1971), Irish-born crystallographer.
- February 2 – Bartel Leendert van der Waerden (died 1996), Dutch mathematician.
- February 22 – Frank P. Ramsey (died 1930), English mathematician.
- April 6 – "Doc" Harold Eugene Edgerton ("Papa Flash", died 1990), American electrical engineer.
- April 9 – Gregory Goodwin Pincus (died 1967), American biologist, co-inventor of the combined oral contraceptive pill.
- April 25 – Andrey Kolmogorov (died 1987), Russian mathematician.
- May 2 – Benjamin Spock (died 1998), American pediatrician and writer.
- May 18 – Frits Warmolt Went (died 1990), Dutch-born American botanist.
- June 14 – Alonzo Church (died 1995), American mathematician.
- July 16 – Irmgard Flügge-Lotz (died 1974), German-American mathematician and aerospace engineer
- August 7 – Louis Leakey (died 1972), British East African paleoanthropologist.
- October 4 – Cyril Stanley Smith (died 1992), English-born metallurgist.
- October 5 – M. King Hubbert (died 1989), American geophysicist.
- October 10 – Bei Shizhang (died 2009), Chinese biologist and founder of the Institute of Biophysics, Chinese Academy of Sciences.
- October 11 – Kazimierz Kordylewski (died 1981), Polish astronomer.
- November 7 – Konrad Lorenz (died 1989), Austrian zoologist.
- November 27 – Lars Onsager (died 1976), Norwegian-born chemist.
- December 19 – George Davis Snell (died 1996), American mouse geneticist and basic transplant immunologist.
- December 28 – John von Neumann (died 1957), Hungarian-born mathematician.

== Deaths ==
- February 1 – Sir George Stokes, 1st Baronet (born 1819), Anglo-Irish mathematician and physicist.
- February 7 – James Glaisher (born 1809), English meteorologist and balloonist.
- March 28 – Émile Baudot (born 1845), French telegraph engineer.
- April 28 – J. Willard Gibbs (born 1839), American physical chemist.
- June 14 – Carl Gegenbaur (born 1826), German anatomist.
- July 21 – Henri Alexis Brialmont (born 1821), Belgian military engineer.
- August 2 – Edmond Nocard (born 1850), French veterinarian and microbiologist.
- August 27 – Kusumoto Ine (born 1827), pioneering Japanese woman physician.
- November 8 – Vasily Dokuchaev (born 1846), Russian geologist.
