= Qabala treasures =

Series of hoards

Qabala treasures (Azerbaijani: Qəbələ dəfinələri) are monetary treasure troves, unearthed in different years near the remnants of Qabala (Azerbaijan), the capital of Caucasian Albania.

== History ==
This treasure was hidden around 120 BC and found randomly during the mining of building stone.

In addition to the monetary units of the Hellenistic states, more than 500 local coins were found in the treasure.

The first trove, unearthed in 1950s, contains the coins of Sassanid ruler Kavadh I (488-531 AD).

The second trove, found in 1964, contains a drachma of Parthian ruler Gotarzes II, as well as denarii of Otho, and coins of the Romans; Vespasian, Trajan and Hadrian and over 150 coins of Sassanid ruler Bahram II (274-291 AD).

In the third trove, found in 1966, seven hundred silver coins (including 170 foreign) were found. Among them are drachmas of Alexander the Great. Parthian rulers Arshak, Mithridates I, Phraates II, Thracian ruler Lisimachos, and Seleucids, all ruled during the 187-129 BC period. Tetradrachms of Greco-Bactrian Kingdom are also found. This trove was hidden in the 120s. Some currency in troves 1-3 circulated in Caucasian Albania in the 3rd-2nd centuries BC.

The fourth trove was hidden in the 1st half of the 11th century and found in 1976. It consists of 53 complete and 1298 crumbled coins, struck during the Ravvadid, Shaddadid and Shirvanshah periods.

In one of the mounds, located two km south-east from Qabala, on the right bank of Qarachay River the trove was dug-over by earth working machinery. This resulted in the coins being scattered over the whole south part of the mound.

== The oldest coins ==
Among the found coins are the earliest coins of Alexander the Great minted in Colophon at the end of IV century BC and the Thracian king Lysimachus tetradrachms. Due to frequent use, these coins were badly frayed. There are also tetradrachms of Antiochus IV, Antiochus VI and Demetrius, and four from Eucratides. One tetradrahm was struck by Diodotus I, but also bears the name of Antiochus II.

On the obverse of the drachmas on behalf of Alexander the Great was portrayed the head of a character of ancient Greek mythology - Hercules in a lion's skin, and on the reverse – the god of thunder Zeus sitting on a throne with an eagle and a scepter.

On the obverse of the tetradrachms on behalf of Lysimachus, the head of Alexander the Great is depicted in a diadem with an Ammon horn, and on the reverse side – the goddess of wisdom Athena in a helmet with a high crest in a sitting position.

The treasures found in Qabala indicate that coins in the name of Alexander the Great were minted in Caucasian Albania from the end of the IV - beginning of the III centuries BC.

As for the Seleucid coins, they began to appear on the marketplaces of Caucasian Albania starting from the 80s of the II century BC.

Some coins have been stolen by local residents.

== See also ==
- Archaeology of Azerbaijan
