= 1972 in archaeology =

The year 1972 in archaeology involved some significant events.

== Excavations ==
- January–April - Dutch East India Company ship Vergulde Draeck wrecked in 1656 off Western Australia.
- Instituto Nacional de Antropología e Historia excavations at Maya site of Coba begin under direction of Carlos Navarrete.
- Tell Abu Hureyra, in Syria.
- Phrasikleia Kore funerary statue (c.540 BCE) at Myrrhinous (Merenta) in Attica.
- Tombs with artefacts at Mawangdui in China (1972–1974 excavations).
- At Mesa Verde National Park, the Wetherill Mesa Archeological Project is completed, with excavation of three cliff dwellings (Long House, Mug House, and Step House), including a survey of Wetherill Mesa and excavation of selected mesa-top sites (begun in 1959).
- A geographer and an aerial photographer studying the Campeche region of the Yucatan Peninsula prove that the Maya practiced intensive agriculture in raised, narrow, rectangular plots that they built above the low-lying, seasonally flooded land bordering along rivers.
- Excavations at Skara Brae under D. V. Clarke begin.
- First excavation of High Pasture Cave on Skye.
- Excavations at a Bronze Age cemetery at Deir al-Balah, where the Deir el-Balah sarcophagi were previously discovered, under Trude Dothan and Itzhaq Beit-Arieh begin.

== Discoveries ==
- August 16 - Riace bronzes are discovered in the Ionian Sea.
- October - Varna Necropolis, in Bulgaria.
- The lost 1st millennium city of Ciudad Perdida is found by Colombian looters; it is not reached by official archaeologists until 1976.
- Tamatsuzuka mural discovered in Asuka, central Nara, Japan.
- Vindolanda tablets discovered by Robin Birley.
- Cave paintings in Galería de la Eduarda y el Kolora at the archaeological site of Atapuerca in northern Spain first discovered by speleologists.

== Publications ==
- March - The International Journal of Nautical Archaeology and Underwater Exploration first published, under the auspices of the Council for Nautical Archaeology in the UK.
- Lewis R. Binford - An Archaeological Perspective. New York: Seminar Press. ISBN 0-12-807750-6
- R. A. Buchanan - Industrial Archaeology in Britain. Harmondsworth: Penguin. ISBN 0-14-021413-5.
- Arthur Raistrick - Industrial Archaeology: an historical survey. London: Eyre Methuen. ISBN 0-413-28050-0.

== Miscellaneous ==
- March 30–September 30 - The Treasures of Tutankhamun exhibition is first shown, at the British Museum in London.
- November 16 - Convention Concerning the Protection of the World Cultural and Natural Heritage adopted by the General Conference of UNESCO, paving the way for the adoption of World Heritage Sites.

== Births ==
- April 4 - Martin Rundkvist, Swedish archaeologist

== Deaths ==
- April 21 - Kenneth Murray, English-born archaeologist in Nigeria (b. 1903)
- May 4 - Hetty Goldman, American archaeologist (b. 1881)
- June 9 - Aage Roussell, Danish archaeologist (b. 1901)
- October 1 - Louis Leakey, Kenyan paleoanthropologist, died in London (b. 1903)
- Charles Green, English archaeologist (b. 1901)

== See also ==
- List of years in archaeology
- 1971 in archaeology
- 1973 in archaeology
