= Magerius Mosaic =

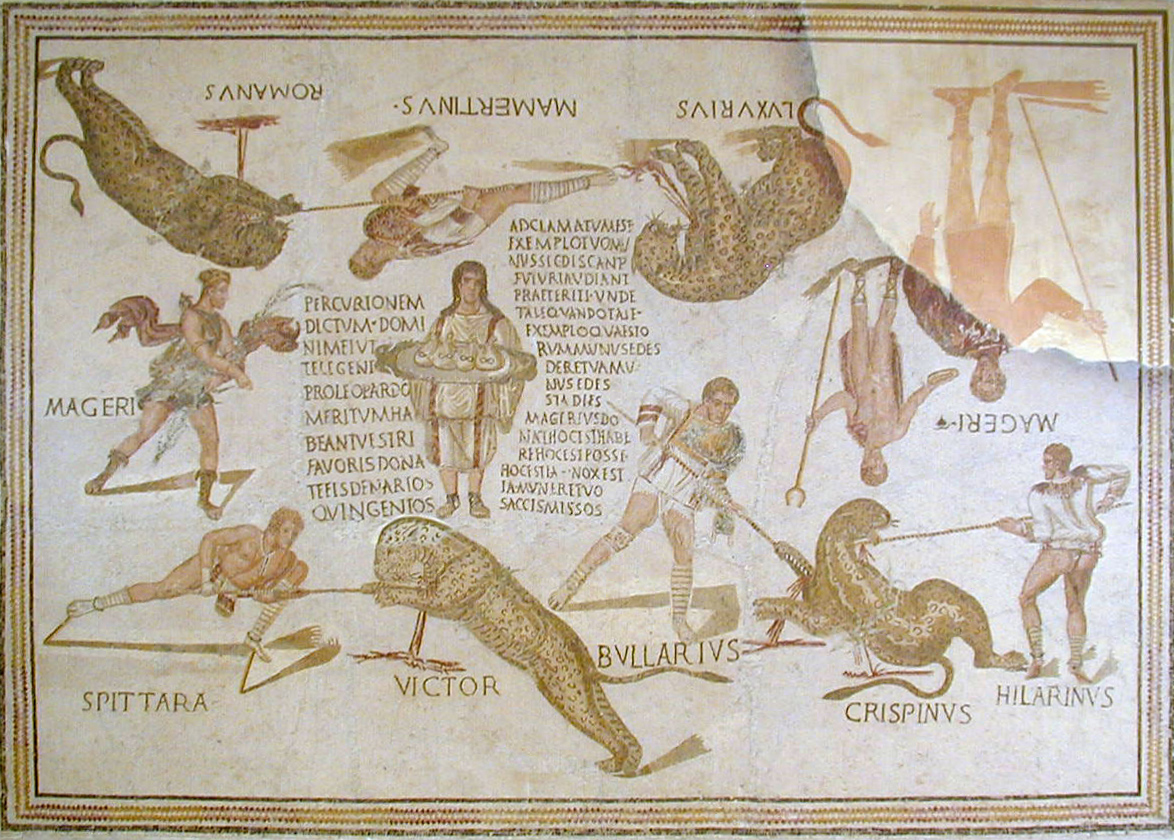
The Magerius Mosaic

The Magerius Mosaic is a 3rd-century Roman mosaic discovered in 1962 in the Tunisian village of Smirat and presently displayed in the Sousse Archaeological Museum. The mosaic presumably decorated a country villa belonging to a man named Magerius.

Depicted in the mosaic is a beast hunt, and four named hunters are shown killing four, also named, leopords. At the centre of the mosaic a steward is shown with four moneybags on a tray. Each moneybag symbolises a thousand denarii. The steward is surrounded by four named leopards, being speared by four named hunters. The mosaic presents a very rare evidence of the actual sums paid for animals used in the amphitheatre spectacles. Two of the three other figures on the mosaic are presumably deities, despite the adjacent Latin inscription Mageri. A figure striding forward on the left is usually identified as the goddess Diana. Another figure, with a saucer-shaped object in his right hand, and a staff in his left, is usually identified as Bacchus or Liber Pater.

Amphitheatre venatio shows were often depicted in villa mosaics.
