= 1959 in archaeology =

The year 1959 in archaeology involved some significant events.

== Excavations ==
- At Mesa Verde National Park, the Wetherill Mesa Archeological Project begins for excavation of three cliff dwellings (Long House, Mug House, and Step House), including a survey of Wetherill Mesa and excavation of selected mesa-top sites (completed in 1972).
- Excavations begin at Amri (completed in 1962).
- Excavations at Nonsuch Palace, Surrey, England, by Martin Biddle begin (completed in 1960).
- Excavations at Caernarfon Mithraeum by National Museum Wales.
- Rescue excavation of Roman villa at Cox Green, Berkshire, England.
- Excavations at Finglesham Anglo-Saxon cemetery begin under the direction of Sonia Chadwick Hawkes (completed in 1967).

== Publications ==
- Alan H. Gardiner - The Royal Canon of Turin.

== Finds ==
- July 17 - Mary Leakey and Louis Leakey find Paranthropus (originally designated "Zinjanthropus") in Olduvai Gorge.
- Arlington Springs Man is found by Phil C. Orr on Santa Rosa Island, California.
- Ongoing excavations at Peking Man Site in Zhoukoudian, China unearth a mandible fragment.
- Da He ding discovered at Tanheli in Hunan, China.

== Miscellaneous ==
- International Centre for the Study of the Preservation and Restoration of Cultural Property opens in Rome.

== Deaths ==
- December 6 - John Winter Crowfoot, English archaeologist and educational administrator (b. 1873)
