= 1965 in archaeology =

The year 1965 in archaeology involved some significant events.

== Excavations ==
- Start of five-year project of excavations and restorations at Altun Ha led by Dr. David Pendergast of the Royal Ontario Museum.
- Start of 18-year excavations at Roman Baths (Bath) led by Barry Cunliffe.
- Start of three-year excavations at Bab edh-Dhra.
- Hinton St Mary Mosaic in England.
- Excavations at Brahmagiri by Amalananda Ghosh.
- Further excavations at the Roman temple of Bziza by Haroutune Kalayan.
- The final version of the 33-meter-high (108-foot) Tikal Temple 33 at the ancient Maya city of Tikal in Guatemala is completely dismantled by archaeologists.
- Excavation at Tel Arad by Yohanan Aharoni (continues until 1967).

== Finds ==
- March 19 - Wreck of the SS Georgiana is discovered off Charleston, South Carolina, exactly 102 years after her sinking, by E. Lee Spence.
- June - Jutholmen wreck (sunk c.1700) is discovered off Dalarö, Sweden.
- June - The Golden Bust of Septimius Severus is found in Didymoteicho, Greece.
- August - Mosaic floor at Sparsholt Roman Villa, Hampshire, England.
- November - Kyrenia ship is found near Kyrenia, Cyprus.
- December - Sword of Goujian is found in Jiangling County, China.
- Geologist Nikolai Samorukov finds petroglyphs in the rocks at Kaikuul Bluff overlooking the Pegtymel River in Chukotka Autonomous Okrug, Russia.
- Group of gold and silver vessels found at Tepe Fullol in northern Afghanistan.
- Fir Clump Stone Circle in Wiltshire, England, rediscovered.
- Mammoth remains found at Mezhirich, Ukraine.
- First fossilized fragment of the hominin later identified as Australopithecus anamensis found in the Kanapoi region of Lake Turkana.
- A carved stone head is discovered during excavations at Deganwy Castle in north Wales. Depicted wearing a crown, the figure may represent Llywelyn the Great who rebuilt the castle in the first third of the 13th century.

== Publications ==
- R. G. Collingwood and R. P. Wright - The Roman Inscriptions of Britain, vol. 1.
- P. V. Glob - Mosefolket Jernalderens Mennesker bevaret i 2000 Ar (The Bog People: Iron-Age man preserved).

== Deaths ==
- July 14 - Herbert Maryon, British conservator (b. 1874).
- October 5 - Sir Ian Richmond, British archaeologist of Ancient Rome (b. 1902).
