= 1966 in science =

The year 1966 in science and technology involved some significant events, listed below.

== Astronomy and space exploration ==
- February 3 – The unmanned Soviet Luna 9 spacecraft makes the first controlled rocket-assisted landing on the Moon.
- March 1 – Venera 3 Soviet space probe crashes on Venus becoming the first spacecraft to land on another planet's surface.
- March 16 – NASA spacecraft Gemini 8 (David Scott, Neil Armstrong) conducts the first docking in space, with an Agena target vehicle.
- March 17 – Soviet Vostok-2 rocket serial U15001-09 carrying reconnaissance satellite Kosmos 112 is the first orbital launch from Plesetsk Cosmodrome.
- March 31 – The Soviet Union launches Luna 10 which later becomes the first spacecraft to enter orbit around the Moon.
- April 3 – Luna 10 is the first manmade object to enter lunar orbit.
- May 25 – Explorer program: Satellite Explorer 32 (Atmosphere Explorer-B) is launched from the United States.
- July 18 – Gemini 10 (John Young, Michael Collins) is launched from the United States. After docking with an Agena target vehicle, the astronauts then set a world altitude record of 474 miles (763 km).
- August 10 – Lunar Orbiter 1, the first U.S. spacecraft to orbit the Moon, is launched.
- November 17 – Notable display of the Leonids over the Americas.
- December 15 – Janus, one of the moons of Saturn, is identified by Audouin Dollfus (it had been first photographed on October 29).
- December 18 – Epimetheus, another of the moons of Saturn, is discovered, but mistaken for Janus which shares its orbit and they are not distinguished until 1978.
- Mullard Space Science Laboratory established in England.

== Biology ==
- The first live specimen of a mountain pygmy possum (Burramys parvus), Australia's only truly hibernating marsupial, previously known only from the fossil record, is discovered.
- German entomologist Willi Hennig's Phylogenetic Systematics is published in English, advancing the study of cladistics.

== Computer science ==
- September 1 – While waiting at a bus stop Ralph H. Baer, an inventor with Sanders Associates in the United States, writes a four-page document that lays out the basic principles for creating a video game to be played on a television: the beginning of a multibillion-dollar industry.
- Martin Richards designs the BCPL programming language.
- Roger MacGowan and Frederick Ordway first suggest the concept of machine superorganisms in Intelligence in the Universe.

== Earth science ==
- Walter C. Pitman and James Heirtzler present the "magic" Eltanin marine magnetic anomaly profile that confirms the hypothesis of seafloor spreading at mid-ocean ridges.

== Mathematics ==
- The Fabius function is published.
- Chen Jingrun publishes Chen's theorem: every sufficiently large even number can be written as the sum of a prime and a semiprime.
- David Mumford introduces Mumford–Tate groups.
- Euler's sum of powers conjecture is disproven by L. J. Lander and T. R. Parkin when, through a direct computer search on a CDC 6600, they have found the counterexample 27^{5} + 84^{5} + 110^{5} + 133^{5} = 144^{5}. Their paper announcing the result is one of the shortest published scientific articles ever published.

== Pharmacology ==
- Gynecologist John McLean Morris and biologist Gertrude Van Wagenen at the Yale School of Medicine report the successful use of oral high-dose estrogen pills for post-coital contraception in women and rhesus macaque monkeys respectively.
- Salbutamol, a bronchodilator, is discovered by a team led by David Jack at the Allen & Hanburys laboratory in the UK; it is launched in 1969 under the trade name Ventolin.

== Physiology and medicine ==
- April 21 – An artificial heart is installed in the chest of Marcel DeRudder in a Houston, Texas, hospital.
- Victor A. McKusick publishes the first edition of his catalogue of all known genes and genetic disorders, Mendelian Inheritance in Man.
- Long-term potentiation (LTP), the putative cellular mechanism of learning and memory, is first observed by Terje Lømo in Oslo, Norway.
- Andreas Rett first describes Rett syndrome.

== Psychology ==
- Human Sexual Response is published by Masters and Johnson.
- On Aggression and Behind the Mirror are published by Konrad Lorenz.

== Technology ==
- January – First proposals for optical fiber communication presented by Charles K. Kao with George Hockham.
- May 2 – Scottish inventor James Goodfellow obtains a UK patent for an automated teller machine using a plastic card and PIN.
- October 16 – The "Caspian Sea Monster" ground-effect vehicle first flies in the Soviet Union.
- Marie Van Brittan Brown originates the home security system in the United States.

== Awards ==
- Fermi Prize – Lise Meitner and Otto Hahn
- Fields Medal in mathematics – Michael Atiyah, Paul Cohen, Alexander Grothendieck and Stephen Smale
- Nobel Prizes
  - Physics – Alfred Kastler
  - Chemistry – Robert S. Mulliken
  - Medicine – Peyton Rous, Charles Brenton Huggins
- Turing Award – Alan Perlis

== Births ==
- February 23 – Didier Queloz, Swiss astronomer.
- April 14 – Polina Bayvel, Ukrainian-born optical communications engineer.
- April 21 – Chris Whitty, English epidemiologist, Chief Medical Officer for England.
- May 17 – Adrian Owen, English neuroscientist.
- June 13 – Grigori Perelman, Russian mathematician.
- July 8 – Ralf Altmeyer, German virologist.
- August 7 – Jimmy Wales, American internet entrepreneur.
- September 10 – Carolyn Bertozzi, American winner of the Nobel Prize in Chemistry.
- September 30 – Shankar Balasubramanian, Indian-born British biochemist.
- October 30 – Irene Tracey, English neuroscientist and academic administrator.
- Undated – Victor Vescovo, American explorer.

== Deaths ==
- January 15 – Sergei Korolev (born 1907), Soviet space scientist.
- March 1 – Fritz Houtermans (born 1903), Prussian-born Dutch physicist.
- March 12 – Sydney Camm (born 1893), English aircraft designer.
- March 26 – Anna Johnson Pell Wheeler (born 1883), American mathematician.
- June 20 – Monsignor Georges Lemaître (born 1894), Belgian physicist.
- July 7 – George de Hevesy (born 1885), Hungarian winner of the Nobel Prize in Chemistry.
- August 10 – Felix Andries Vening Meinesz (born 1887), Dutch geophysicist.
- October 1 – Mary Logan Reddick (born 1914), African American neuroembryologist.
- October 3 – Rolf Maximilian Sievert (born 1896), Swedish physicist.
