= 1961 in archaeology =

The year 1961 in archaeology involved some significant events.

== Explorations ==
- The site of Ai-Khanoum is located.

== Excavations ==
- April 24 - Swedish warship Vasa, sunk on her maiden voyage in 1628, is recovered from Stockholm harbor.
- November - Start of one-year excavation of Malik by Iranian archaeologists.
- First excavations at Anshan in Iran by Fereidoon Tavallali.
- Helge Ingstad and Anne Stine Ingstad begin excavation of Viking artifacts at L'Anse aux Meadows in Newfoundland, first archaeologically confirmed evidence of Pre-Columbian trans-oceanic contact.
- INAH project dredges artifacts from the Sacred Cenote at Chichen Itza.
- Start of excavations at Çatalhöyük by James Mellaart.
- First underwater archaeology at Alexandria carried out by Kamal Abu el-Saadat.
- Re-excavation of the causewayed enclosure at Knap Hill in Wiltshire, England, by Graham Connah.
- The first season of excavations at Degannwy Castle in Wales; the excavation is led by Leslie Alcock and concludes in 1966.
- The first season of excavations at an Anglo-Saxon cemetery in Worthy Park in Hampshire; the excavation is led by Sonia Chadwick Hawkes and concludes in 1962.
- Start of excavations at Tripontium in England by the Rugby Archaeological Society, continuing to 2006.

== Publications ==
- M. J. Aitken - Physics and Archaeology.
- Glyn Daniel - The Idea of Prehistory.
- Alan Gardiner - Egypt of the Pharaohs.
- George E. Mylonas - Eleusis and the Eleusinian Mysteries

== Finds ==
- Mortuary Temple of Thutmose III, Deir el-Bahari, Egypt.
- Wreck of ship off Ceylon carrying silver rupees minted by Aurangzeb.

== Events ==
- January 5 - Italian sculptor Alfredo Fioravanti signs a confession in the United States consulate in Rome stating that he was part of the team that forged the Etruscan terracotta warriors in the Metropolitan Museum of Art. Chemical tests performed in 1960 had already proven that the statues were forgeries.
- October 6–8 - 'The Iron Age in Northern Britain' conference held in Edinburgh, organised by the Council for British Archaeology

== Births ==
- Ken Dark, English Roman archaeologist

== Deaths ==
- September 3 - Fay-Cooper Cole, American anthropologist (born 1881)
