= 1969 in archaeology =

The year 1969 in archaeology involved some significant events.

== Excavations ==
- The Byzantine Fortress at Isthmia is excavated.
- In Iran, Bard-e Bal, a necropolis, is excavated by the Belgian archaeological mission, along the banks of the Garāb river (continue to 1970).
- In Cyprus, an unlooted tomb of the Cypro-Classic I period is excavated.
- At the Extramural Sanctuary of Demeter and Persephone at Cyrene, site ЕЮ/(Area 1), 1, 3, as a dump of the imperial period, predating the 3rd century, is excavated.
- Excavations at Habuba Kabira by the Deutsche Orient-Gesellschaft begin (continue to 1975).
- Excavations at Ekalte by the DO-G.
- Excavations at Salona, Yugoslavia, by an American team (continue to 1972).
- Excavations at Birka, Sweden, begin under Björn Ambrosiani.
- On the Isle of Wight, two barrows on Ashey Down are excavated.
- With a British expedition at Cambodunum, in Bavaria (Germany), an area to the north of the fort is excavated, during which several timber buildings are identified in a vicus settlement.
- In Ireland, the burial mound at Grannagh, near Ardrahan in County Galway (first excavated in 1916 by R.A.S. Macalister) is re-excavated in 1969 by Etienne Rynne.
- The Missouri River steamboat Bertrand is excavated, revealing the hull with cargo in the center, later removed.

== Publications ==
- J. N. L. Myres - Anglo-Saxon Pottery and the Settlement of England.

== Finds ==
- June - Blackfriars Ship II discovered by Peter Marsden in London.
- Ship remains at the Marsala Ship site off Sicily are discovered.
- Wreck of the VOC ship Amsterdam (lost on her maiden voyage in 1749) is exposed off Bulverhythe in the English Channel.
- In Ireland, from the burial mound at Grannagh, finds included 10 glass beads (one of dumbbell-shape), 3 fragmentary bronze La Tène-type fibulae of rod-bow type, some bone beads or pins, and some items of iron.
- In Wuwei County, Gansu Province, Lanzhou, an artefact is excavated depicting a vigorous horse with long tail waving and head perking.
- In Australia, "Mungo Woman", first of the Lake Mungo remains, is discovered by Jim Bowler, one of the world's oldest cremations at around 24,000 years BP.

== Miscellaneous ==
- January 10 - Historic American Engineering Record program founded by the National Park Service and the American Society of Civil Engineers.
- June - Schooner Alvin Clark (sunk 1864) is salvaged from Green Bay (Lake Michigan).

== Deaths ==
- May 7 - Axel Boëthius (born 1889)
