= 1967 in science =

The year 1967 in science and technology involved some significant events, listed below.

== Anthropology ==
- October 12 – Desmond Morris publishes The Naked Ape.

== Astronomy and space exploration ==
- January 27 – Astronauts Gus Grissom, Ed White, and Roger B. Chaffee are killed in a fire during a plugs-out test for Apollo 1.
- January 27 – The United States, Soviet Union and UK sign the Outer Space Treaty.
- April 20 – Surveyor 3 probe lands on the Moon.
- April 24 – Soviet cosmonaut Vladimir Komarov is killed during the landing of Soyuz 1.
- October 18 – The Soviet Venera 4 probe descends through the Venusian atmosphere, which it analyzes.
- October 19 – Mariner 5 probe flies by Venus.
- November 9 – Apollo program: NASA launches a Saturn V rocket carrying the unmanned Apollo 4 test spacecraft from Cape Kennedy.
- November – Pulsars discovered by Jocelyn Bell Burnell working with Antony Hewish at the University of Cambridge, for which Hewish is awarded a Nobel Prize in Physics in 1974. These rapidly pulsating radio sources are explained a year later as rotating neutron stars.
- NRAO builds the 36-foot Radio Telescope, later to become the ARO 12m Radio Telescope.

== Biology ==
- Chimpanzee Washoe begins to learn American Sign Language.
- Robert H. MacArthur and E. O. Wilson publish The Theory of Island Biogeography.

== Cartography ==
- Arno Peters reinvents the Gall orthographic equal-area projection.

== Computing ==
- May – Ole-Johan Dahl and Kristen Nygaard present their paper on Class and Subclass declarations at the IFIP Working Conference on simulation languages in Oslo. This paper becomes the first formal definition of Simula 67.
- June – CDC 7600 supercomputer released.

== Mathematics ==
- Errett Bishop publishes Foundations of Constructive Analysis, proving theorems in real analysis using constructive analysis.
- Michael Goldberg demonstrates that none of the original Malfatti circles are ever optimal.
- Robert Langlands proposes his conjectures.
- PhD students William M. Boyce and John P. Huneke independently prove the common fixed point problem conjecture to be false by providing examples of commuting functions on a closed interval that do not have a common fixed point.

== Physics ==
- The electroweak interaction theory is introduced by Steven Weinberg.
- The Toda lattice is introduced by Morikazu Toda as a simple model for a one-dimensional crystal in solid state physics.

== Physiology and medicine ==
- January 12 – The body of American psychologist Dr James Bedford becomes the first to undergo cryopreservation with the intent of future resuscitation.
- May – Dr René Favaloro performs the first saphenous vein autograft in coronary artery bypass surgery, at the Cleveland Clinic in the United States.
- August – 1967 Marburg virus outbreak in West Germany leads to identification of Marburg virus.
- October 14 – Ruth Sonntag Nussenzweig publishes her demonstration that mice can acquire immunity to the Plasmodium berghei parasite by exposing the mice to P. berghei sporozoites that have been inactivated by X-ray irradiation.
- December 3 – Dr Christiaan Barnard and a team including his brother Marius perform the first successful human heart transplantation, at Groote Schuur Hospital in Cape Town, South Africa, on Louis Washkansky, who survives for eighteen days before dying of pneumonia.
- December 6 – Dr Adrian Kantrowitz performs the first pediatric heart transplant, at Maimonides Medical Center in Brooklyn, United States, on a 19-day-old infant, who survives for six hours.
- Thomas Starzl performs the first successful human liver transplantation, at the University of Colorado Health Sciences Center.
- First use, in a case of myocardial infarction, of the intra-aortic balloon pump invented by Dr Adrian Kantrowitz and his brother Arthur.
- Neurosurgeons Jean Talairach and Gabor Szikla create the Talairach coordinates for brain mapping.
- Charles Kelman introduces phacoemulsification for cataract surgery.
- St Christopher's Hospice, the world's first purpose-built secular hospice specialising in palliative care of the terminally ill, is established in South London by Cicely Saunders with the support of Albertine Winner.

== Technology ==
- June 27 – The first automated teller machine, devised by John Shepherd-Barron, enters service, in London.
- Date unknown – The first hydraulic breaker "Hydraulikhammer HM 400" is invented by German company Krupp.

== Awards ==
- Nobel Prizes
  - Physics – Hans Bethe
  - Chemistry – Manfred Eigen, Ronald George Wreyford Norrish, George Porter
  - Medicine – Ragnar Granit, Haldan Keffer Hartline, George Wald
- Turing Award – Maurice Vincent Wilkes

== Births ==
- February 24 – Brian Schmidt, Australian astrophysicist, recipient of the Nobel Prize in Physics (2011).
- February 27 – Jony Ive, British-American industrial designer.
- October 11 – Ardem Patapoutian, Armenian-American neurophysicist, recipient of the Nobel Prize in Physiology and Medicine (2021).

== Deaths ==
- January 3 – Reginald Punnett (born 1875), English geneticist.
- January 16 – Robert J. Van de Graaff (born 1901), American physicist.
- January 19 – Casimir Funk (born 1884), Polish biochemist, coined the term vitamin.
- January 27 – Apollo 1 American astronauts
  - Roger Chaffee (born 1935)
  - Gus Grissom (born 1926)
  - Ed White (born 1930).
- February 18 – J. Robert Oppenheimer (born 1904), American physicist.
- March 27 – Jaroslav Heyrovský (born 1890), Czech chemist.
- April 5 – Hermann Joseph Muller (born 1890), American geneticist.
- April 24 – Vladimir Komarov (born 1927), Soviet Russian cosmonaut on Soyuz 1.
- May 5 – Owen Thomas Jones (born 1878), Welsh geologist.
- May 27 – Tilly Edinger (born 1897), German American paleoneurologist.
- August 22 – Gregory Goodwin Pincus (born 1903), American biologist, co-inventor of the combined oral contraceptive pill.
- October 27 – Kurt Schneider (born 1887), German psychiatrist.
