= 1962 in archaeology =

The year 1962 in archaeology involved some significant events.

== Explorations ==
- Ian Graham makes first map of Maya site of El Mirador.
- Historic American Buildings Survey records Johnson's Mill Bridge, a wooden covered bridge over Chickie's Creek in Lancaster County, Pennsylvania.

== Excavations ==
- Little Brickhill excavations 1962–1964 in Buckinghamshire, England.
- Ongoing excavations at Aphrodisias in Anatolia begun by Kenan Erim under the aegis of New York University.
- Excavation of Tel Arad by Yohanan Aharoni (continues until 1967).

== Publications ==
- Lewis R. Binford - Archaeology as Anthropology.
- Peter H. Sawyer - The Age of the Vikings

== Finds ==
- January 15 - The Derveni papyrus, which dates to 340 BCE, making it the oldest surviving manuscript in Europe, is discovered at a grave site in Macedonia (Greece).
- September 6 - Blackfriars Ship I discovered by Peter Marsden in London.
- October 8 - Bremen cog discovered in the Weser.
- Neolithic remains at Jiahu discovered by Zhu Zhi.
- First evidence for human occupation of Australia during the last glacial period discovered at Kenniff Cave, Queensland.

== Events ==
- March - First Conference of Western Archaeologists on Problems of Point Typology at Idaho State College Museum.

== Births ==
- Nikolai Grube, German Mayan epigrapher
- Li Feng, Chinese American sinologist

== Deaths ==
- William Duncan Strong, American archaeologist (born 1899)
