= 1968 in archaeology =

The year 1968 in archaeology involved some significant events.

== Explorations ==
- Survey of Anshan in Iran.

== Excavations ==
- Anne Stine Ingstad and Helge Ingstad complete excavations of Viking site at L'Anse aux Meadows.
- Prof. Richard J. C. Atkinson undertakes work at Silbury, broadcast on BBC Television (continues to 1970).
- Colin Renfrew begins excavations at Sitagroi, Greece (continues to 1970).

== Publications ==
- Sally R. and Lewis R. Binford (ed.) - New Perspectives in Archeology.
- David L. Clarke - Analytical Archaeology.

== Finds ==
- Archaeological prospection of Buvuma Island directed by the Tervuren Museum finds early use of pottery.
- An early medieval burial excavated at Suontaka Vesitorninmäki, Tyrväntö, in southern Finland includes the Suontaka sword among ambiguous features of gender expression; research published in 2021 suggests the individual buried had Klinefelter syndrome.
- The lower jaw part of a presumably female Homo heidelbergensis pre-Neanderthal (azykantrop) is found in the acheulean age layer in Azykh cave, in Azerbaijan.
- The Inscription of Sargon II at Tang-i Var.
- San José y Las Animas (shipwreck), which sank off Florida in 1733, located.

== Miscellaneous ==
- June 26 - Pope Paul VI claims that bones discovered in the vicinity of Saint Peter's tomb in 1942 are relics of Peter.
- Project to move temples of Abu Simbel to prevent their inundation by the Aswan High Dam successfully completed.
- The Egyptian Department of Antiquities and the Getty Conservation Institute in Santa Monica, California start a conservation project for tomb of Queen Nefertari.
- Analysis of the environment of Shanidar Cave in Kurdistan suggests that the adult male Neanderthal "Shanidar 4" may have been buried with floral tributes.

== Deaths ==
- December 18 - Dorothy Garrod, English Palaeolithic archaeologist of the Near East (born 1892).
