= 1973 in archaeology =

The year 1973 in archaeology involved some significant events.

== Explorations ==
- 16th century subterranean mills are located in caves in Col des Roches, Switzerland.

== Excavations ==
- Meadowcroft Rock Shelter under James M. Adovasio.
- Heavenly Horse Tomb (Cheonmachong), a mounded tomb of Silla (c. AD 300/400-668) royalty in Gyeongju, Korea.
- Wilhelmina Feemster Jashemski and her colleagues have the opportunity to work on the previously undisturbed peristyle garden of the House of G. Polybius in Pompeii.
- Somerset Levels Project begins.

== Finds ==
- Vindolanda tablets discovered by Robin Birley near Hadrian's Wall, England.
- Fossils of a human premolar and 40 mammalian species excavated at Locality 4 in Zhoukoudian, China.
- St Peter's Church, Dunwich, discovered submerged off the Suffolk coast of England by Stuart Bacon.
- A large Song dynasty trade ship of c.1277 CE is dredged up from the waters near the southern coast of China with 12 compartments in its hull. It confirms the descriptions of bulkheaded hull compartments for junks in Zhu Yu's Pingzhou Table Talks of 1119.
- Updown early medieval cemetery in Kent, England, discovered through the use of aerial photography.
- Aphrodite Hypolympidia at Dion, Pieria in Greece.

== Events ==
- May–September - Tomb of Casimir IV Jagiellon in Wawel Cathedral, Kraków, opened for conservation.
- July 18 - Protection of Wrecks Act passed in the United Kingdom. The first site designated under it is the Cattewater Wreck at Plymouth on September 5.
- The first Mesa Redonda de Palenque conference in Palenque starts major improvements in understanding Maya hieroglyphics and the iconography of Maya civilization.
- Confirmation that a site in Iran is the lost city of Anshan.
- Tucson Garbage Project initiated by William Rathje.

== Publications ==
- Coles, John (1973). Archaeology by Experiment. London: Hutchinson University Library. ISBN 0-09-116870-8.
- Hawkes, Christopher; Hawkes, Sonia (eds.). Greeks, Celts, and Romans: studies in venture and resistance. London: Dent. ISBN 0460078429.
- Renfrew, Colin (1973). Before Civilisation: the Radiocarbon Revolution and Prehistoric Europe. London: Cape. ISBN 0-224-00790-4.
- Renfrew, Jane M. (1973). Palaeoethnobotany: the prehistoric food plants of the Near East and Europe. London: Methuen. ISBN 0-416-16510-9.

== Births ==
- May 19 - Alice Roberts, English evolutionary biologist, biological anthropologist and science and archaeology populariser
