= 1983 in archaeology =

List of years in archaeology	(table)
- … 1973; 1974; 1975; 1976; 1977; 1978; 1979; 1980; 1981; 1982; 1983; 1984; 1985; 1986; 1987; 1988; 1989; 1990; 1991; 1992; 1993 …
- In science 1980 1981 1982 1983 1984 1985 1986
- Art; Archaeology; Architecture; Literature; Music; Philosophy; Science; +...

The year 1983 in archaeology involved some significant events.

== Explorations ==
- Laconia Survey begins (joint British–Dutch project); continues to 1989.

== Excavations ==
- Mausoleum of the Nanyue King, Zhao Mo, Emperor Wen of Nanyue (d. 122 BCE), discovered under Elephant Hill in Guangzhou, China, and excavation by Mai Yinghao and Huang Zhanyue begins.
- Tell Qarqur in Syria, by an American team, is begun.
- Hengistbury Head, by Barry Cunliffe, is continued (begun in 1979).
- Boxgrove Quarry, by Mark Roberts of University College London, is begun (continues to 1996).
- Excavation of the Sima de los Huesos (Pit of Bones) at the archaeological site of Atapuerca in northern Spain begins.
- Abric Romani cave near Capellades in Catalonia is begun.

== Publications ==
- Christopher Chippindale - Stonehenge Complete.
- R. C. Gaur - Excavations at Atranjikhera: early civilization of the Upper Ganga Basin.

== Finds ==
- May 13 - Lindow Woman discovered at Lindow Moss in north west England by peat cutters.
- First Ayn Ghazal statues found in Jordan.
- Zhangjiashan Han bamboo texts, including the Book on Numbers and Computation, from tomb M247 at Mount Zhangjia in central China.
- Kitora Tomb discovered at Asuka, Nara, Japan.
- 16th century turkey bones in Exeter, England, subsequently identified as from one of the earliest of the birds in Britain.
- Gloucester tabula set in England.
- A multi-tablet collection of literature in the Hurrian language with a Hittite translation is discovered at Hattusa in Turkey.

== Events ==
- British Committee for the Reunification of the Parthenon Marbles is formed.

== Deaths ==
- Joan du Plat Taylor, British pioneer of maritime archaeology (b. 1906)
