= 1978 in archaeology =

List of years in archaeology	(table)
- … 1968; 1969; 1970; 1971; 1972; 1973; 1974; 1975; 1976; 1977; 1978; 1979; 1980; 1981; 1982; 1983; 1984; 1985; 1986; 1987; 1988 …
- In science 1975 1976 1977 1978 1979 1980 1981
- Art; Archaeology; Architecture; Literature; Music; Philosophy; Science; +...

The year 1978 in archaeology involved some significant events.

== Excavations ==
- New excavations at Brahmagiri by Amalananda Ghosh.
- Excavations begin at Bontnewydd Palaeolithic site in Wales.
- New excavations begin at Holyhead Mountain Hut Circles on Holy Island, Anglesey, off the coast of Wales.
- Comprehensive excavations at Alepotrypa cave in Greece begin.
- Excavation of Proto-Elamite levels of Susa in Iran.

== Finds ==
- February 21 - The remains of the Great Pyramid of Tenochtitlan.
- March - Pictish stone depicting a bearded figure at Rhynie, Aberdeenshire, Scotland.
- Bactrian Gold hoard.
- A new Shapwick hoard of Roman copper coins in England.
- Cherchen Man in China.
- A fossilized partial human cranium is among hominid remains found in Apidima Cave in southern Greece; in 2019 it is announced as dating to more than 210,000 years BP, making it the earliest example of Homo sapiens outside Africa.
- First discovery of European lion remains at Tiryns in Mycenaean Greece.
- Wreck of a Basque whaling galleon, probably the San Juan, off Saddle Island, Labrador.

== Publications ==
- Lewis R. Binford - Nunamiut Ethnoarchaeology.
- Mounir Bouchenaki - Cités antiques d'Algérie.
- Kenneth Dover - Greek Homosexuality.
- Richard A. Gould (ed.) - Explorations in Ethnoarchaeology.
- Keith Muckelroy - Maritime Archaeology.
- Paleontologist Björn Kurtén's short novel Dance of the Tiger, dealing with the interaction between Cro-Magnons and Neanderthals, is published in Sweden as Den Svarta Tigern.

== Events ==
- Theban Mapping Project is established.
- September - Thousands march through Dublin to Wood Quay to protest against the building of civic offices on the Viking site.

== Deaths ==
- August 19 - Sir Max Mallowan, English archaeologist (born 1904).
- August 24 - Dame Kathleen Kenyon, English archaeologist of the Neolithic Fertile Crescent and college principal (born 1906).
- October 8 - Bertha Cody, Native American archaeologist (born 1907).
- November 8 - Terence Mitford, British archaeologist of the Near East (born 1905).
