= 1979 in archaeology =

List of years in archaeology	(table)
- … 1969; 1970; 1971; 1972; 1973; 1974; 1975; 1976; 1977; 1978; 1979; 1980; 1981; 1982; 1983; 1984; 1985; 1986; 1987; 1988; 1989 …
- In science 1976 1977 1978 1979 1980 1981 1982
- Art; Archaeology; Architecture; Literature; Music; Philosophy; Science; +...

The year 1979 in archaeology involved some significant events.

== Explorations ==
- Tillya Tepe surveyed by a Soviet-Afghan mission of archaeologists led by Victor Sarianidi.

== Excavations ==
- Hengistbury Head by Barry Cunliffe (continues to 1984).

== Finds ==
- July - Fossil hominid footprints found at Laetoli, Tanzania, by Mary Leakey.
- Wreck of SS Xantho found off Western Australia.
- Wreck of HMS Stirling Castle (1679) found on the Goodwin Sands.
- Wreck of English ship Swan (1641) found off the west coast of Scotland.
- Wreck of French-built English ship HMS Invincible (1747) found in The Solent.
- Burial site related to the 1918 execution of the Romanov family at Yekaterinburg, by Alexander Avdonin.
- Roman fort at Elginhaugh discovered by air-photography.
- Black rat bones from about the fifth century AD reported as found in York, the first pre-medieval record in England.
- The prehistoric site of Isernia La Pineta discovered during the construction of a road link of Strada statale 85.

== Publications ==
- Aubrey Burl - Prehistoric Avebury.
- J. M. Coles and A. F. Harding - The Bronze Age in Europe: an introduction to the prehistory of Europe, c.2000–700 BC.
- Kenneth Hudson - World Industrial Archaeology.
- A. L. F. Rivet and Colin Smith - The Place-names of Roman Britain.
- Anglo-Saxon Studies in Archaeology and History series founded by David Brown, James Campbell, and Sonia Chadwick Hawkes.

== Events ==
- June 2 - Protesters opposed to the building of civic offices on the site of Viking excavations in Wood Quay, Dublin, occupy the area.

== Births ==
- February 8 - Stuart Wilson, English archaeologist working in Wales

== Deaths ==
- January 15 - Yang Zhongjian, father of Chinese vertebrate paleontology, buried at Peking Man site in Zhoukoudian, China (b. 1897)
- January 20 - Robert Wauchope, American archaeologist and anthropologist (b. 1909)
- January 24 - Raissa Calza, Ukrainian-born archaeologist of Ancient Rome, previously ballet dancer (b. 1894)
- August 1 - Li Ji, Chinese archaeologist (b. 1896)
- August 25 - Alberto Ruz Lhuillier, Mexican archaeologist, discoverer of the tomb of K'inich Janaab' Pakal at Palenque (b. 1906)
- December 14 - Charles McBurney, American-born archaeologist working in Britain (b. 1914)
