= 1988 in archaeology =

List of years in archaeology	(table)
- … 1978; 1979; 1980; 1981; 1982; 1983; 1984; 1985; 1986; 1987; 1988; 1989; 1990; 1991; 1992; 1993; 1994; 1995; 1996; 1997; 1998 …
- In science 1985 1986 1987 1988 1989 1990 1991
- Art; Archaeology; Architecture; Literature; Music; Philosophy; Science; +...

The year 1988 in archaeology involved some significant events.

== Excavations ==
- Excavations at Troy begin by team from the University of Tübingen and the University of Cincinnati under the direction of Professor Manfred Korfmann.
- The Kent Archaeological Rescue Unit at Crofton Roman Villa.
- Excavation of Ancient Greek shipwreck at Ma'agan Michael.

== Publications ==
- Peter Harbison - Pre-Christian Ireland: from the first settlers to the early Celts.

== Finds ==
- Earrings, crown and rosettes from the tomb of Queen Yabay in Kalhu (modern Nimrud, Iraq) are discovered. They were made in the late 8th century BC. They are displayed at Iraq Museum, Baghdad.
- Discovery of the Palatine wall in Rome.
- Uncovering of a Christian basilica of c. 300 CE at Aqaba in Jordan.
- Discovery of a shipwreck of 500–460 BC off Gela (Sicily).
- Accidental discovery of the remains of a Roman amphitheatre in the City of London in excavation of foundations of new Guildhall Art Gallery.
- Discovery of the Semliki harpoon in the Katanda Territory of the Democratic Republic of Congo.
- Colossal Nike statue of the Victoria Romana type from Hadrian's Library in Athens, Greece.

== Births ==
- Lisa Lodwick, British archaeologist (d. 2022)

== Deaths ==
- January 8 - Einar Gjerstad, Swedish archaeologist of the Mediterranean (b. 1897).
- April 13 – V. S. Wakankar, Indian archaeologist (b. 1919).
- April 15 – George E. Mylonas, Greek archaeologist (b. 1898).
- December 25 - W. F. Grimes, Welsh archaeologist (b. 1905).
