= Lindow =

Lindow may refer to:

== Places ==
- Amt Lindow (Mark), collective municipality in the district of Ostprignitz-Ruppin, Brandenburg, Germany
- Lindow (Mark), town in the Ostprignitz-Ruppin district, Brandenburg, Germany
- Lindów, Masovian Voivodeship, village in Żyrardów County, Masovian Voivodeship, Poland
- Lindów, Silesian Voivodeship, village in Kłobuck County, Silesian Voivodeship, Poland
- Lindow Common, Site of Special Scientific Interest in Wilmslow, Cheshire, England
- Lindow Moss, peat bog in Cheshire, England
  - Lindow Woman, partial remains of a female bog body discovered at Lindow Moss
  - Lindow Man, preserved bog body of a man discovered at Lindow Moss

== Persons ==
- Al Lindow (1919–1989), American football player
- John Lindow (born 1946), scholar of Old Norse and Scandinavian studies
- Steven E. Lindow (born 1951), American plant pathologist
