= 2007 in archaeology =

This page lists major events of 2007 in archaeology.

== Excavations ==
- South China Sea shipwrecks.
- River Boyne shipwreck (1530s) off Drogheda in Ireland.
- Large-scale excavation of Buckton Castle in the north west of England begins under the direction of Brian Grimsditch of the University of Manchester Archaeology Unit. The dig concluded in 2010.
- Excavations at Mausoleum of Augustus in Rome begin.

== Finds ==
- 6 January: Vale of York Hoard of 617 mostly Anglo-Saxon silver coins and 65 other items of precious metal deposited by Vikings soon after 927 CE is discovered near Harrogate in the north of England (reported 19 July).
- 15 January: A Jeulmun Pottery Period pit burial containing the c. 2000 BC skeletons of two humans in a death embrace at the Ando-ri Site in Yeosu, South Korea.
- 16 January: A fossilized human skull found at Pestera cu Oase, Romania, is dated to be about 35,000 years old and described to have features of mixed origin, both from modern Homo sapiens and older branches of the genus Homo.
- 13 February: Excavation of stone percussive tools made by chimpanzees on a site in the Ivory Coast used by chimps 4,300 years BP is announced.
- April: First discoveries in River Wear at Elvet Bridge in Durham, England.
- 7 May: A team of Israeli archaeologists discover the tomb of Herod the Great, ruler of Judea (1st century BC).
- 3 August: Mexican archaeologists announce discovery of what is believed to be the tomb of Aztec emperor Ahuitzotl.
- Summer: Asthall hoard of mostly 15th century gold angel coins found in Oxfordshire, England.
- September: Rehov beehives, Israel.
- 1 September: Discovery under a private ground in Marcianise of what is believed to be the rests of the Roman castrum that probably originated the town.
- 13 December: Discovery of what is believed to be the wreckage of the Quedagh Merchant, a pirate ship abandoned by Captain William Kidd in the 17th century, by divers in shallow waters off Catalina Island, Dominican Republic reported.
- Gozo Phoenician shipwreck.
- Divers locate a wreck off the Norfolk coast of England which in 2022 will be disclosed to be HMS Gloucester which ran aground on a sandbank in 1682 with the future King James II of England on board.
- Spartia temple, Greece.
- Late Iron Age high-status warrior grave found in rescue dig at Chichester in southern England.
- Early prehistoric artefacts in Misliya Cave, Israel.
- Paleolithic tools from Jwalapuram in India (published).
- A carving of a mammoth estimated to be 13,000 years old, is found in Gough's Cave in Cheddar Gorge, England.
- Dornier Do 215 light bomber off Waddenzee in the Netherlands.

== Publications ==
- David W. Anthony - The Horse, the Wheel and Language: How Bronze-Age Riders from the Eurasian Steppes Shaped the Modern World.
- Dan Hicks - The Garden of the World: an Historical Archaeology of Sugar Landscapes in the Eastern Caribbean.
- Ruth M. Van Dyke - The Chaco Experience: Landscape and Ideology at the Center Place.
- Samuel M. Wilson - The Archaeology of the Caribbean.

== Events ==
- 13 September: United Nations Declaration on the Rights of Indigenous Peoples recognises indigenous rights to the protection of their cultures.
- 30 October: Researchers backdate the male remains known as the "Red Lady of Paviland" (discovered in 1823) by 4,000 years to 29,000 years BP, making it the earliest known human burial in Britain.
- Report on excavation of Kinsey Cave in North Yorkshire finds evidence of the presence of bears and lynx in early medieval England.

== Deaths ==
- 20 February: Kenneth Steer, British archaeologist and British Army officer (b. 1913)
- 19 July: Alanah Woody, American archaeologist (b. 1956)
- 20 October: Stine Rossel, Danish archaeologist (b. 1975)
- 24 December: Wilhelmina Feemster Jashemski, American archaeologist (b. 1910)
