= Luxor Museum =

Archaeological museum in Luxor, Egypt

Coordinates: 25°42′27″N 32°38′41″E

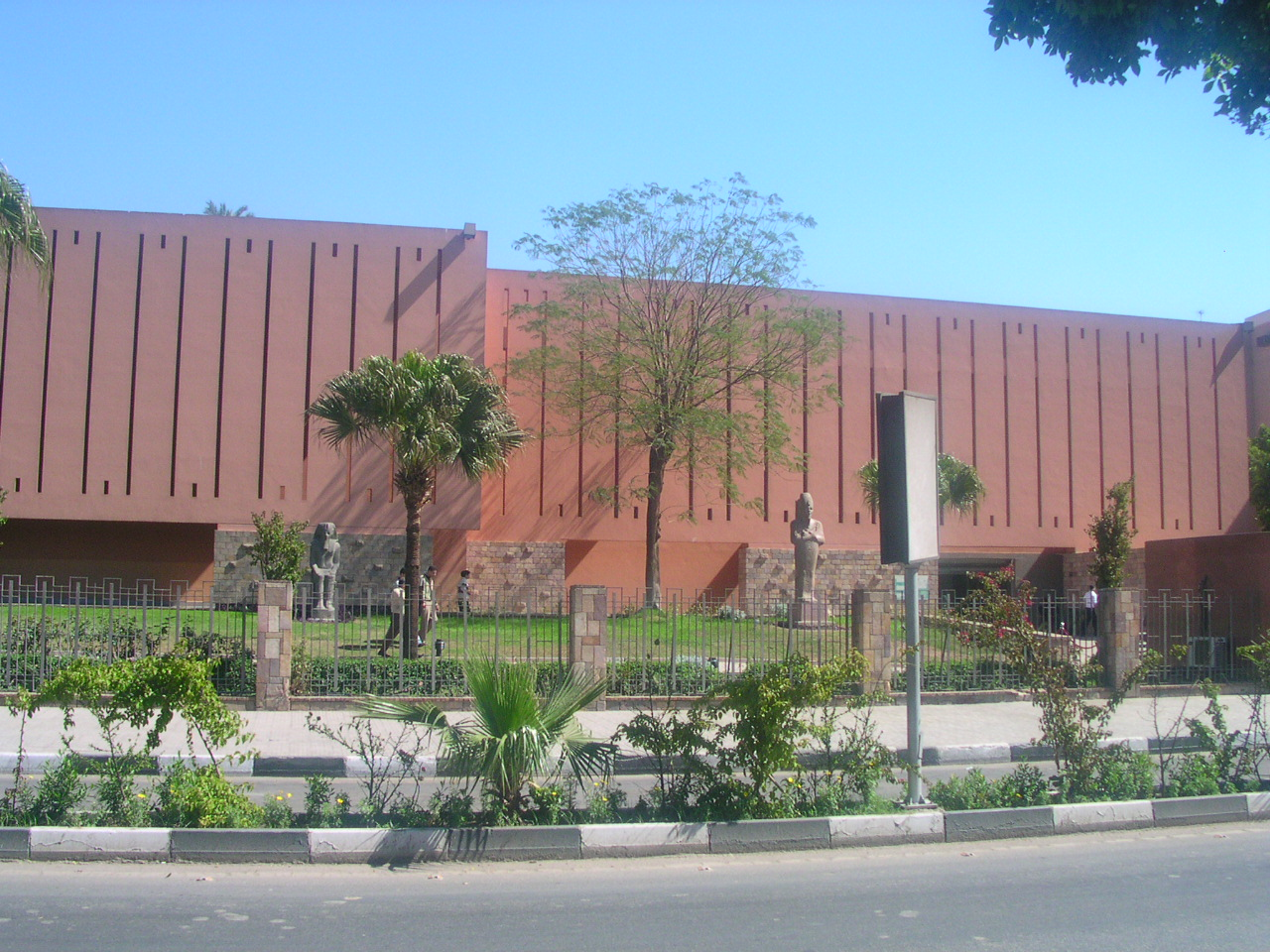
- Established: 1975
- Location: Luxor, Egypt
- Type: Egyptology, history museum, archaeological museum
- Founder: Ministry of Culture
- Website: sca-egypt.org

Luxor Museum is an archaeological museum in Luxor, Egypt. It stands on the corniche, overlooking the east bank of the River Nile.

== Establishment ==
The Luxor Museum was inaugurated in 1975. It is a two-story building. The range of artifacts on display is far more restricted than the country's main collections in the Egyptian Museum in Cairo; this was, however, deliberate, since the museum prides itself on the quality of the pieces it has, the uncluttered way in which they are displayed, and the clear multilingual labeling used.

The museum was conceived by the Egyptian Ministry of Culture, which hired Dr. Mahmud El Hakim, a top Egyptian architect, to create the plans in 1962. The installation of the museum art works came later and was finished between 1972 and 1975.

== Collection ==
Among the items on display are grave goods from the tomb of the 18th dynasty pharaoh Tutankhamun (KV62) and a collection of 26 New Kingdom statues that were found buried in the Luxor statue cache in the nearby Luxor Temple in 1989. The royal mummies of two pharaohs – Ahmose I and Ramesses I – were also put on display in the Luxor Museum in March 2004, as part of the new extension to the museum, which includes a small visitor centre. A major exhibit is a reconstruction of one of the walls of Akhenaten's temple at Karnak. One of the featured items in the collection is a calcite double statue of the crocodile god Sobek and the 18th Dynasty pharaoh Amenhotep III.

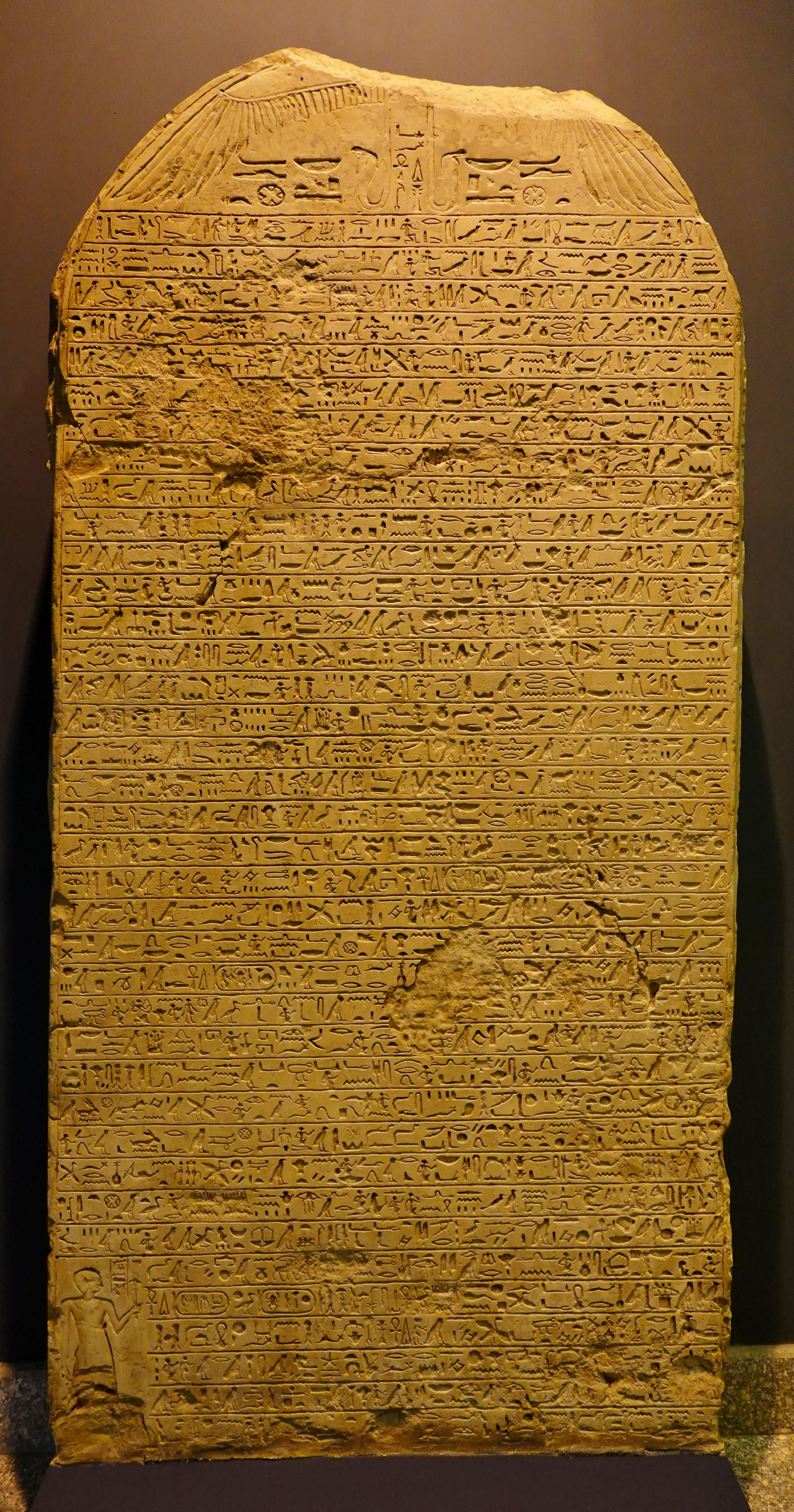
Kamose stela; circa 1550 BC; limestone; height: 2.3 m, width: 1.1 m, depth: 28.5 cm; from the Karnak Temple (Egypt)

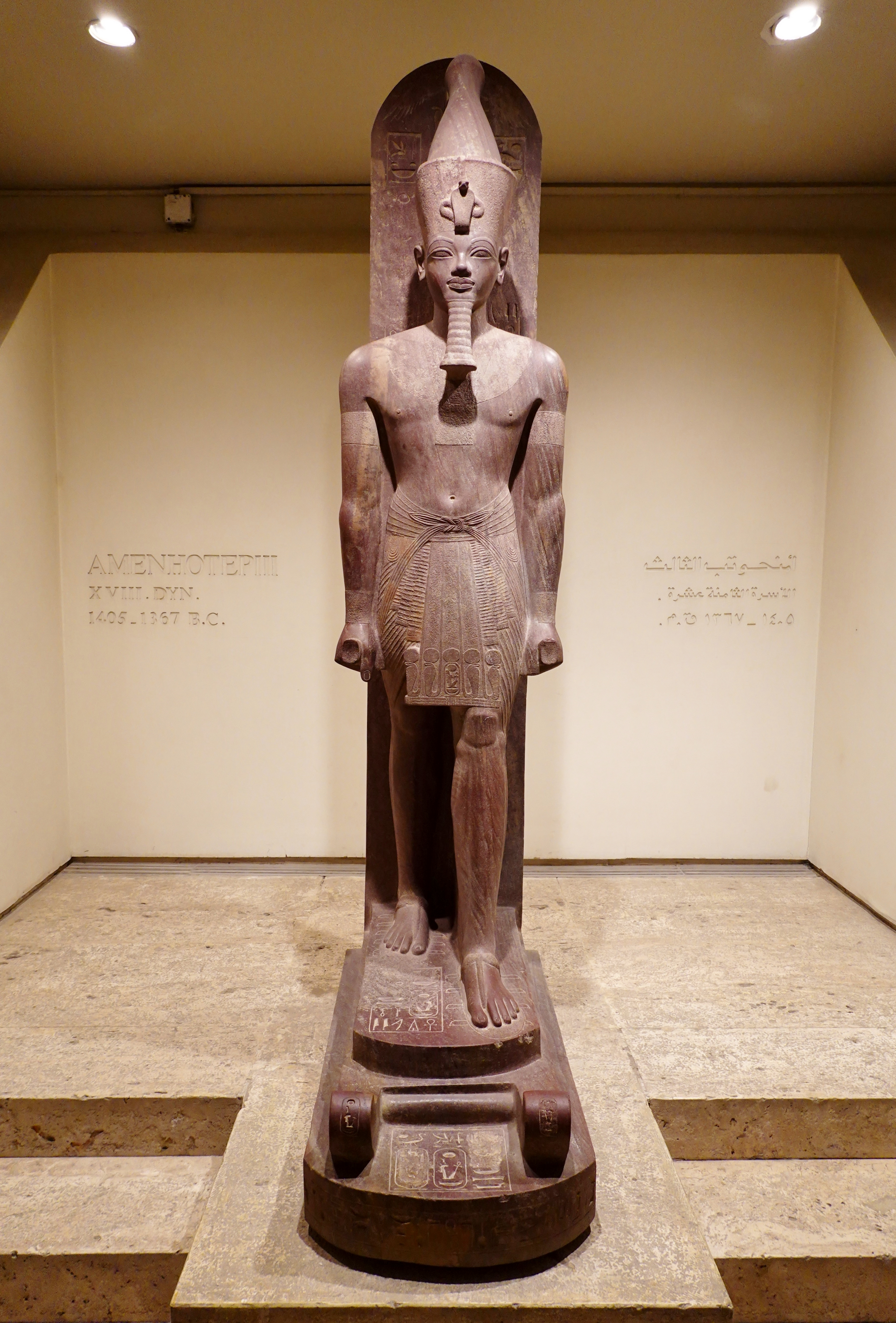
Amenhotep III; circa 1390-1352 BC; quartzite; height: 2.49 m

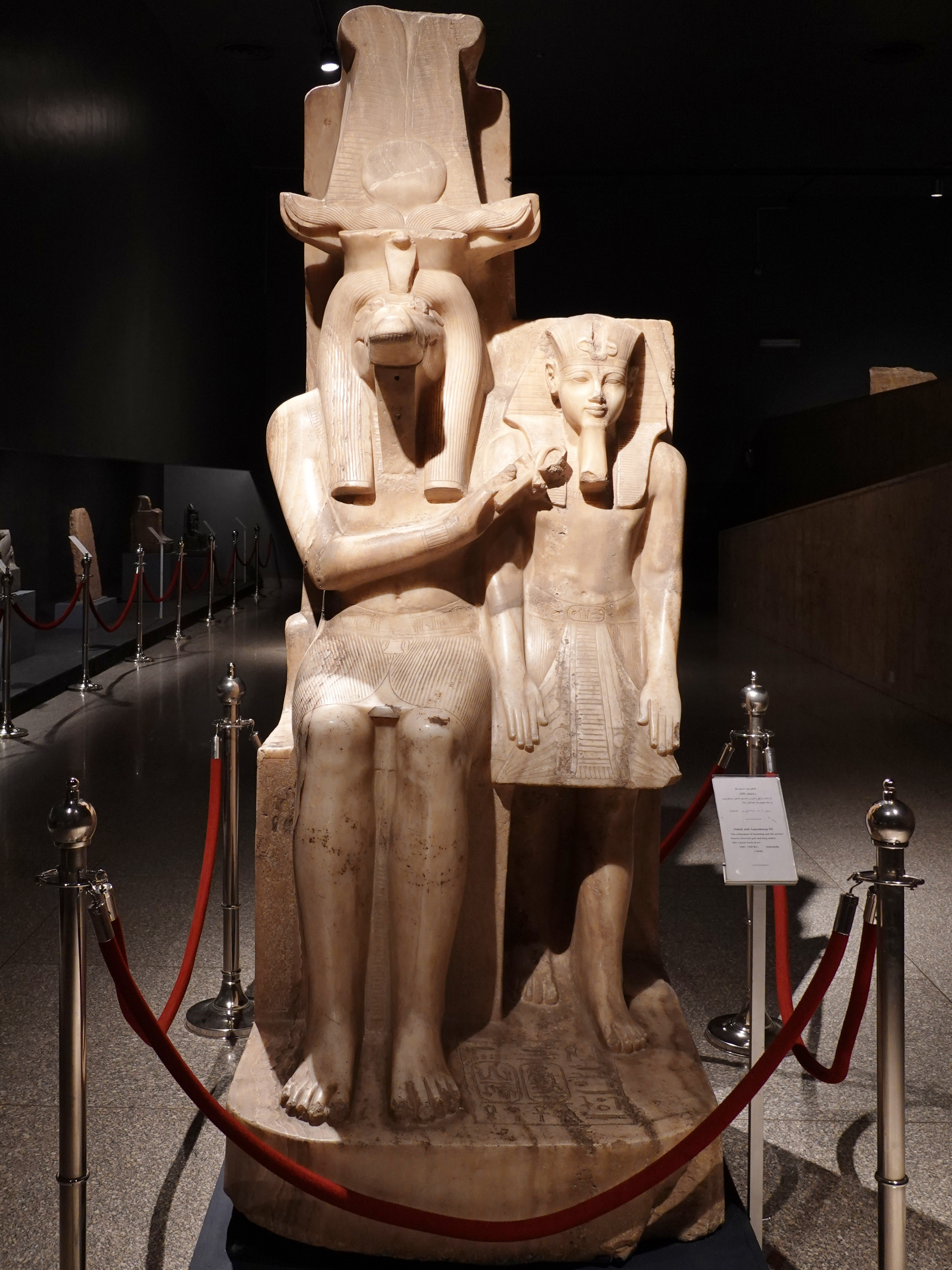
Amenhotep and Sobek, from Dahamsha, now in the Luxor Museum

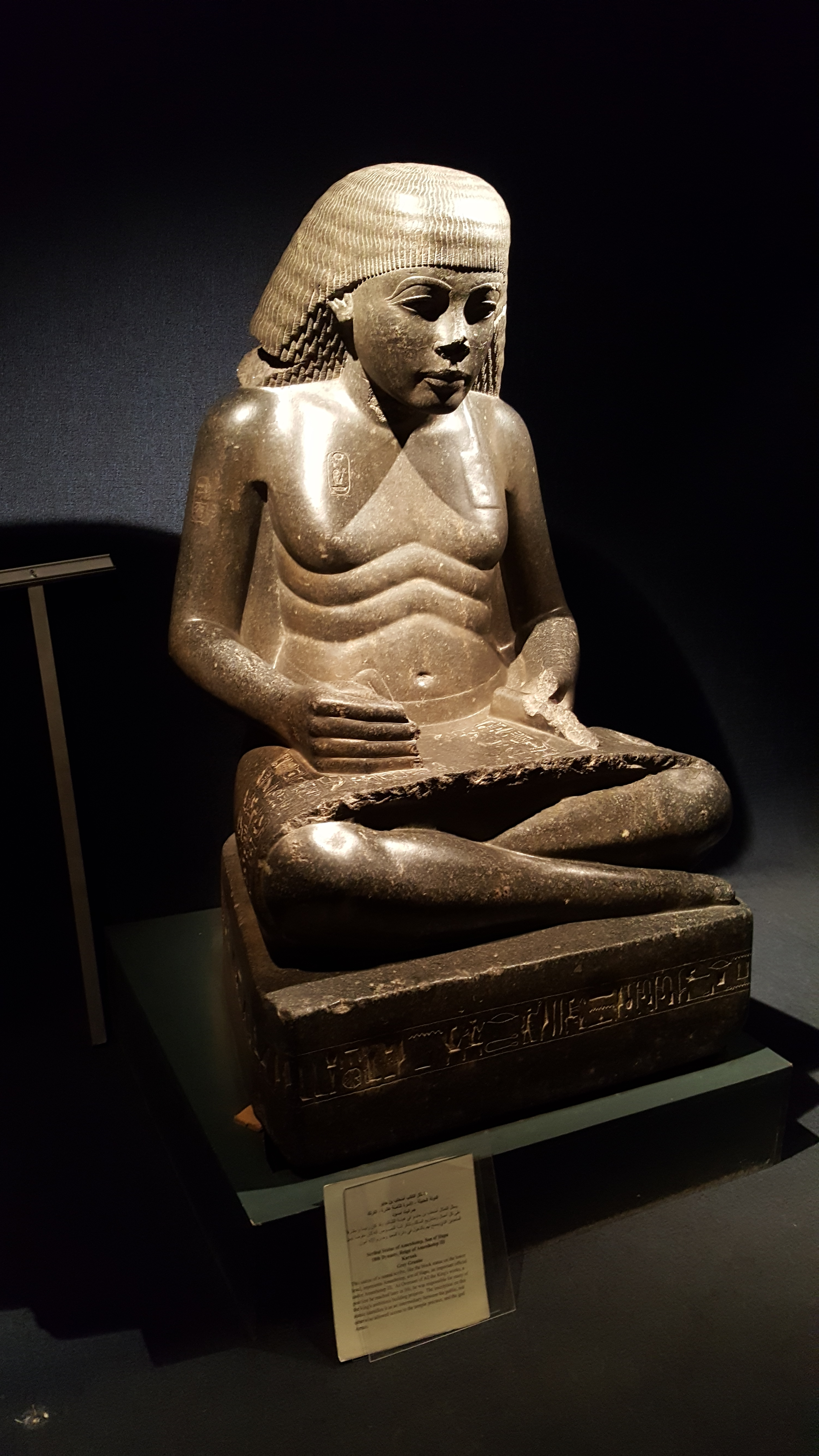
Scribe statue of Amenhotep, son of Hapu; circa 1390-1352 BC; granodiorite; height: 1.3 m; from Karnak (Egypt)

Double statue of the gods Amun and Mut, with the features of Seti I and Tuya, respectively

== See also ==
- List of museums of Egyptian antiquities
