= Don Brothwell =

British archaeologist

Professor Don Brothwell FRAI
- Born: Donald Reginald Brothwell; 1933; Nottingham, Nottinghamshire, England
- Died: 26 September 2016 (aged 83)
- Title: Professor of Human Palaeoecology

Academic background
- Education: University College London

Academic work
- Discipline: Archaeology
- Sub-discipline: Palaeoecology; Environmental archaeology
- Institutions: University of Cambridge; British Museum; Institute of Archaeology, University of London; University of York

Donald Reginald Brothwell, FRAI (1933 – 26 September 2016) was a British archaeologist, anthropologist and academic, who specialised in human palaeoecology and environmental archaeology. He had worked at the University of Cambridge, the British Museum, and the Institute of Archaeology, University of London, before ending his career as Professor of Human Palaeoecology at the University of York. He has been described as "one of the pioneers in the field of archaeological science".

== Early life and education ==
Brothwell was born in 1933 in Nottingham, England. He began his involvement in archaeology as a teenager; this included analysing finds from a local gravel works, and excavating Anglo-Saxon skeletons at a local quarry with some school friends. He was involved in his first official archaeological excavation in Thurgarton, Nottinghamshire, where they excavated and recorded a number of medieval burials. Having finished secondary school, he enrolled in art college with the aim of becoming a teacher. However, after a year he returned to school to study for A-Levels in geology, biology, and chemistry.

Having earned three A-Levels, Brothwell was offered a place at University College London to study anthropology. However, as he had completed his A-Levels a year later than most, at 19, he was immediately called up to serve his National Service. With his interests in Quakerism and knowledge of his father's experience of World War I, he became a conscientious objector. He was prosecuted and ordered to pay a large fine (for which his father provided the money), but was called up for a second time after settling with the court. This time his refusal resulted in a prison sentence which he served at HM Prison Lincoln. He continued his interest in archaeology while imprisoned, including excavating a bulldog skull that he found in the yard during his daily exercise.

Brothwell only served two months of a one-year sentence and was released in time to take up his place at University College London. From 1952 to 1956, while based in the Department of Anthropology, he studied a wide range of courses; these were mainly anthropology or archaeology related, but he also studied geology, zoology, and genetics. He graduated in 1956 with a Bachelor of Science (BSc) degree. He then began a doctorate in physical anthropology, but he left without completing it after two years of research to take up his first academic position.

== Academic career ==
In 1958, Brothwell joined the Department of Archaeology and Anthropology at the University of Cambridge as a demonstrator. His duties involved teaching biological anthropology, and his research was focused on physical anthropology, palaeopathology, human origins, and teeth. His research during this time led to him editing a volume with his colleague Eric Higgs, Science and Archaeology (1963), and a text book for archaeologists, Digging up Bones (1963). The demonstratorship was a time-limited appointment and after three to five years he would have to look for a new job.

In 1961, Brothwell moved to the British Museum as Principal Scientific Officer and Head of Anthropology. This was a new sub-department of the museum but it grew quickly with donations of human skeletons from the Royal College of Surgeons and the Department of Anatomy, University of Oxford. During his twelve years at the British Museum, he held the "only funded professional position studying archaeological human skeletal remains in the United Kingdom".

In 1974, Brothwell moved to the Institute of Archaeology, University of London, having been appointed a senior lecturer in zooarchaeology. His research during this period extended from human remains to animal skeletons; this was very varied and included animal diseases, guinea pig domestication, and domestic pests. He was also interested in bog bodies, and led a diverse team to investigate the Lindow Man in the 1980s. Perhaps because of his diverse research interests, he was never made a professor but he was promoted to reader.

Brothwell left the Institute of Archaeology in 1993 having originally intended to take early retirement. However, that year he was offered and accepted the appointment of Professor of Human Palaeoecology in the Department of Archaeology at the University of York. He retired in 1999 and was appointed emeritus professor.

In 1974, Brothwell founded the Journal of Archaeological Science; from 1974 to 1993, he served as its Joint-Editor. From 1984 to 2004, he served as Editor of the Cambridge Manuals in Archaeology.

== Later life ==
After he retired, Brothwell continued with research projects including an investigation of mummies in Yemen. As Emeritus Professor at University of York he continued to teach and supervise postgraduates. From 2006 until his death, he was also an Honorary Research Fellow at Durham University, where he taught on its master's degree in palaeopathology.

Brothwell died on 26 September 2016, aged 83. On 7 October, his burial took place and a celebration of his life was held at the King's Manor in York (the main building of the University of York's Department of Archaeology).

== Honours ==
In 1999, the year of Brothwell's retirement, a conference was held in his honour at the University of York. A number of papers from that conference were published as a Festschrift in 2002. It was titled Bones and the Man: Studies in Honour of Don Brothwell, was edited by Keith Dobney and Terry O'Connor, and included contributions by Graeme Barker and Chris Stringer.

== Selected works ==
- With A. T. Sandison (eds.) 1967. Diseases in Antiquity. Springfield: Thomas.
- With J. Baker. 1980. Animal Diseases in Archaeology. London: Academic Press.
- 1969. "The palaeopathology of Pleistocene and more recent mammals," pp 310–314. In Brothwell, D. and Higgs, E (eds.), Science in Archaeology. New York: Thames and Hudson.
- 1981. Digging up Bones. Third Edition. New York: Cornell University Press.
- 1988. "Smut, scab and pox: disease and environmental archaeology," pp273–277. In Bintliff, J.L., Davidson, D.A. and Grant, E.G. (eds.), Conceptual Issues in Environmental Archaeology. Edinburgh: University Press.
- 1988. "On zoonoses and their relevance to paleopathology," pp 18–22. In Ortner, D.J and Aufderheide, A.C (eds.). Human Paleopathology: Current Syntheses and Future Options. Washington and London: Smithsonian Institution Press.
- With K. Dobney. 1988. "A Scanning Electron Microscope Study of Archaeological Dental Calculus," pp 372–385. In Olsen, S.L (ed.) Scanning Electron Microscopy in Archaeology. British Archaeological Reports International Series 452. Oxford: BAR.
- 1991. "Malocclusion and methodology: The problem and relevance of dental malalignment in animals." International Journal of Osteoarchaeology 1: 27–37.
- 1993. "Avian osteopathology and its evaluation." Archaeofauna 2: 33–43.
- With K. Dobney, and A. Ervynck. 1996. "On the causes of perforations in archaeological domestic cattle skulls." International Journal of Osteoarchaeology 6: 471–487.
- 2000. "On the complex nature of microbial ecodynamics in relation to earlier human palaeoecology," in G. Bailey, R. Charles and N. Winder (eds) Human ecodynamics
- 2000. "Studies on skeletal and dental variation: a view across two centuries," in M. Cox and S. Mays (eds) Human osteology in archaeology and forensic science
- 2002. "Ancient avian osteopetrosis: the current state of knowledge. Proceedings of the 4th Meeting of the ICAZ Bird Working Group Kraków, Poland, 11–15 September 2001." Acta zoologica cracoviensia 45 (special issue): 315–318.
