= Keith Dobney =

British archaeologist and academic

Keith M. Dobney FSA FLS is a British archaeologist and academic, specialising in bioarchaeology and palaeopathology of human and animal remains. Since 2020, he has been Head of the School of Philosophical and Historical Inquiries at the University of Sydney. He previously worked at the Institute of Archaeology, the University of York, the University of Durham, the University of Aberdeen, and the University of Liverpool.

== Selected works ==
- Dobney, Keith; Brothwell, Don (1987). "A method for evaluating the amount of dental calculus on teeth from archaeological sites". Journal of Archaeological Science. 14 (4): 343–351. Bibcode:1987JArSc..14..343D. doi:10.1016/0305-4403(87)90024-0.
- Dobney, Keith; Rielly, Kevin (1988). "A method for recording archaeological animal bones: the use of diagnostic zones". Circaea. 5 (2): 79–96.
- Dobney, Keith; Jaques, Deborah; Irving, Brian G. (1996). Of butchers & breeds: report on vertebrate remains from various sites in the city of Lincoln. Lincoln: City of Lincoln Council.
- Dobney, Keith; Ervynck, Anton (2000). "Interpreting developmental stress in archaeological pigs: the chronology of linear enamel hypoplasia". Journal of Archaeological Science. 27 (7): 597–607. Bibcode:2000JArSc..27..597D. doi:10.1006/jasc.1999.0477.
- Dobney, Keith M.; O'Connor, Terry, eds. (2002). Bones and the Man: Studies in Honour of Don Brothwell. Oxford: Oxbow Books. ISBN 978-1842170601.
- Dobney, Keith; Larson, Greger (2006). "Genetics and animal domestication: new windows on an elusive process" (PDF). Journal of Zoology. 269 (2): 261–271. doi:10.1111/j.1469-7998.2006.00042.x.
