= Lindow Common =

Peat marsh in Cheshire, England

Coordinates: 53.3266°N 2.2503°W

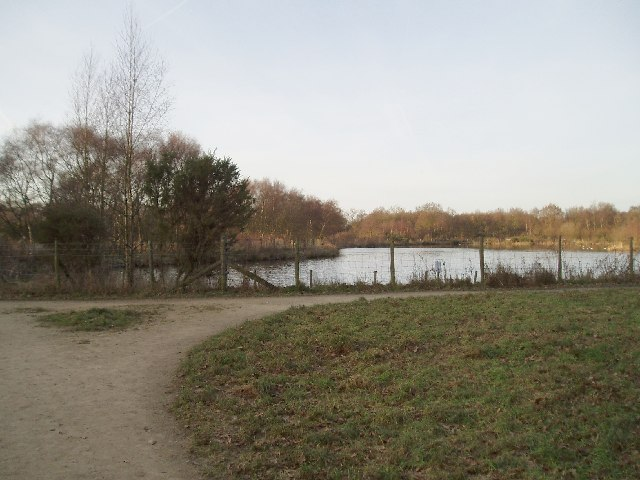
Black Lake, Lindow Common

Lindow Common is a Site of Special Scientific Interest (SSSI) on the western edge of the town of Wilmslow, Cheshire, in the northwest of England. It is also designated a Local Nature Reserve.

The Common was an area of heathland where, in centuries past, villagers could graze their cattle, but over the last century or so, birch trees have overrun many areas, so that much of the Common is covered by trees.

In the middle of Lindow Common lies the Black Lake. The Welsh for Black Lake is llyn ddu, the derivation of Lindow. The name Lindow is also used for one of the historic parishes of Wilmslow, and of the adjacent Lindow Moss, much of which is covered in an ancient peat bog. It was at Lindow Moss that a bog body, Lindow Man, was discovered in 1984. Lindow Man is now on display at the British Museum.

Lindow Common was managed by Macclesfield Borough Council's Countryside and Ranger Service. The common is now managed by Cheshire East Council.

Current work at Lindow Common is aiming to start selective removal of birch trees, in order to promote regrowth of heather (Calluna vulgaris) to return the area to heathland. This is one of only two sites in Cheshire with areas of lowland wet heath.

A racecourse once existed around the outskirts of the Common. The racecourse is no longer there, but the road around the perimeter is called Racecourse Road.

The Common features (under its Welsh name Llyn-dhu) in Alan Garner's popular children's fantasy novel The Weirdstone of Brisingamen.

== Land ownership ==
All land within Lindow Common SSSI is owned by the local authority.
