= Spartia temple =

Archaeological site in Greece

Coordinates: 39.3832°N 22.8487°E

The Spartia temple is an ancient Greek cult site excavated at the foot of the hill of Spartia, north of the village of Sesklo, in the Magnesia regional unit of Greece. An inscribed dedication suggests the worship there of the Greek mythological figures Heracles and Alcmene.

== Excavation ==
During a rescue excavation alongside the railroad tracks, archaeologists of the Greek Archaeological Service discovered a number of artifacts showing the existence of a sanctuary dating to the archaic period. Items recovered include bronze vases, objects of lead and clay, weapons, iron tools, and figurines. Some specific artifacts named are clay metopes with yellow veneer, spearheads, and part of the arm of a marble statue.

== Bronze phiale ==
One important artifact is a bronze phiale (described as "navel-shaped") in excellent condition with the inscription "Tilephilos dedicated me to Herakles" in the archaic Greek alphabet. This indicates the presence of a Herakles cult, which is linked to Pherae and is documented in the region through Hellenistic-era inscriptions.

The phiale had been found several years before its value was recognized when a natural gas pipeline was built near the hill of Spartia by the Volos-Velestinos-Larissa highway (on the site of the ancient Pherae-Pagasses road). Put in storage by the XIII Ephorate of Prehistoric and Classical Antiquities of the Ministry for Culture, the object was rediscovered when it was cleaned during conservation work.
