= 1984 in archaeology =

The year 1984 in archaeology involved some significant events.

== Explorations ==
- Ian Graham makes first scientific examination and map of Maya site of Cival.

== Excavations ==
- Hengistbury Head, by Barry Cunliffe, is completed (begun in 1979).
- Khok Phanom Di, by Charles Higham (1984–85).
- May - An M4 Sherman amphibious tank lost off Slapton, England during Exercise Tiger, a rehearsal for the 1944 Invasion of Normandy, is recovered.
- July - Uluburun shipwreck, by the Institute of Nautical Archaeology under George Bass, begun (continues until 1994).

== Publications ==
- Bradley, Richard (1984). The Social Foundations of Prehistoric Britain: themes and variations in the archaeology of power. London: Longman. ISBN 0-582-49163-0.
- Harding, A. F (28 January 1984). The Mycenaeans and Europe. London: Academic Press. ISBN 0-12-324760-8.
- Kelso, William M (1984). Kingsmill Plantation, 1619-1800: archaeology of country life in colonial Virginia. Orlando: Academic Press. ISBN 0-12-403480-2.
- Pilcher, J. R.; et al. (1984). "A 7,272-year tree-ring chronology for western Europe". Nature. 312 (5990): 150–152. Bibcode:1984Natur.312..150P. doi:10.1038/312150a0. S2CID 4341922.

== Finds ==
- July - Pirate ship Whydah Gally (wrecked off Cape Cod in 1717) discovery announced.
- August 1 - Lindow Man is found in Lindow Moss in north west England by peat cutters.
- September - 1928 Scania truck (sunk 1936) located in Fryken, Sweden.
- November - Commerce raider CSS Alabama (sunk off Cherbourg peninsula in 1864) is found by the French Navy.
- Turkana Boy is found in Kenya by team led by Richard Leakey.

== Events ==
- April - Jorvik Viking Centre opens in York, England.

== Deaths ==
- February 28: Taha Baqir, Iraqi archaeologist (born 1912)
- April 5: Giuseppe Tucci, Italian Orientalist (born 1894)
