= Korean Archaeological Society =

Professional and scholarly association of archaeologists in South Korea

- Hangul: 한국고고학회
- Hanja: 韓國考古學會
- Revised Romanization: Hanguk Gogohakhoe
- McCune–Reischauer: Han'guk Kogohakhoe

The Korean Archaeological Society is a professional and scholarly association of archaeologists in South Korea. The society publishes the peer-reviewed Journal of the Korean Archaeological Society (Hanja: 韓國考古學報; RR: Hanguk Gogo-Hakbo). This journal is the South Korean equivalent of scholarly archaeological journals such as American Antiquity, Kaogu, Antiquity, and Kōkogaku Kenkyū. The society also hosts a national conference every year in early November.

The organization has been around in one form or another since the Koreanization of archaeology began in the wake of Japanese colonial rule in Korea (c. 1910–1945). Antecedents of the Korean Archaeological Society include the Korean Art Historical Society (Hanguk Misulsa Hakhoe) and the Korean Archaeology and Ancient Art History Society (考古美術同人會; Gogo Misul Donginhoe), the latter of which was formed in 1961. The first issue of the journal Archaeology and Ancient Art History (考古美術; Gogo Misul) was published the previous year. In 1968 the name of the journal was changed to Studies in Art History (美術史硏究; Misulsahak Yeongu).

== Origins ==
The year 1967 also marked the foundation of another academic society by Kim Je-won, the head of the National Museum of Korea, along with a small coterie of scholars including Kim Won-yong, Kim Jeong-gi, Yun Mu-byeong, Han Byeong-sam, Im Hyo-jae, and several others (Yoon 2006:265). These scholars were concerned about publicizing archaeological excavations in Korea more than anything else, and together they published the first issue of a journal called Archaeology (Gogohak) in 1968. Subsequent issues were published occasionally between 1969 and 1979.

Yet another competing group emerged in 1967: the Association of Korean Archaeology (韓國考古學協會; Hanguk Gogohak Hyeophoe). This group was led by the ancient-historian/archaeologist Kim Gi-ung of Dong-A University.

=== Consolidation ===
In 1976, Kim Won-yong and 38 other scholars met at Korea University for a conference and formed what is essentially the modern version of the Korean Archaeological Society. However, the name adopted in the meeting, the Society of Korean Archaeological Studies (Hanguk Gogohak Yeongu Hakhoe) slightly differs from the name used today. During the same meeting, they officially dissolved the old Association of Korean Archaeology. Kim was installed as the first president of the society. The regular publication of Hanguk Gogo-Hakbo began from this time. In 1986 the Korean Archaeological Society adopted its present name.

== Structure and administration ==
The society is hosted and run on a rotating basis by university departments and other institutions for a period of approximately 1–2 years. The current host of the society is the Department of History at Soongsil University, Seoul. The current president of the Korean Archaeological Society is Professor Choi Byeong-hyeon of the Department of History, Soongsil University. Choi became president in mid-2006. The former president of the Korean Archaeological Society is the Professor Lee Baek-kyu of Gyeongbuk National University in Daegu.

The society has several thousand individual members in South Korea who consist of regular (i.e. professors, instructors, researchers) and student members. University libraries around the world subscribe to the Journal of the Korean Archaeological Society as institutional members. Most of the hundred or so individual members from outside South Korea live in Japan.

The Korean Archaeological Society has actively lobbied the South Korean central and provincial governments on important matters related to the preservation and protection of Korean cultural heritage. They also offer periodic professional workshops for archaeologists in South Korea.

=== Journal ===
The Korean Archaeological Society published its 60th issue of Hanguk Kogo-Hakbo with a 30th anniversary issue in Autumn 2006.

The majority of those who read and contributed articles to the journal until the 1990s were ancient historians and historical archaeologists. As such, the subject matter dealt with in the journal was heavily weighted to the Korean Three Kingdoms Period and culture. In the last 15 years the scope of Korean salvage and academic archaeological excavations has widened considerably, and thus the content of the journal has changed to reflect that. Now the journal has published articles ranging chronologically from the Korean Palaeolithic to the Jeulmun, Mumun and Protohistoric periods.

== See also ==
- Society for American Archaeology: leading archaeological society in the Americas
- The Prehistoric Society: a British organization
