= 1976 in archaeology =

The year 1976 in archaeology involved some significant events.

== Excavations ==
- The Chaco Project (National Park Service and University of New Mexico) excavates fourteen rooms at Pueblo Alto from 1976 to 1978.
- Hwangnyongsa, a large-scale Buddhist temple of the Korean Three Kingdoms state of Silla dating to AD 553 (excavations continue until 1983).
- Excavations at Tell Brak, Syria, are begun by a team from the Institute of Archaeology of the University of London (continue until 1981).
- Excavations at Tell el-'Oueili in Iraq are begun under the direction of Jean-Louis Huot (continue until 1989).
- Excavations in the Karakum Desert by Viktor Sarianidi uncover the Bactria–Margiana Archaeological Complex.
- Excavations at Mezhirich, Ukraine, resume, by N. L. Korniets and M. I. Gladkih (continue to 1981).
- Neolithic Tomb of the Eagles in Orkney first excavated by Ronald Simison.
- Excavation at Twann Bahnhof neolithic pile dwelling site in Switzerland (begun 1974) concludes.
- Chogha Bonut discovered in Iran and excavation begins.
- Watch Hill Castle in Greater Manchester, England, partially excavated by the North Cheshire Archaeology Group under the direction of Barry Johnson
- Rescue excavation at Updown early medieval cemetery in Kent, England, led by Sonia Chadwick Hawkes uncovered 36 graves.

== Publications ==
- The Landscape of Towns by Michael Aston and James Bond.
- La Résistance africaine à la Romanisation by Marcel Bénabou.
- The Stone Circles of the British Isles by Aubrey Burl.
- The Mycenaean World by John Chadwick.
- Prehistoric Maori Fortifications by Aileen Fox.
- "The integration of historical and archaeological data concerning an historic wreck site, the Kennemerland", by Keith Muckelroy, World Archaeology 7.3 pp 280–289.
- Farming in the Iron Age by Peter J Reynolds.
- Industrial Archeology: A New Look at the American Heritage by Theodore Anton Sande.

== Finds ==
- Tomb of Fu Hao discovered at Yinxu.
- Joya de Cerén, "Pompeii of the Americas".
- Nim Li Punit.
- The fourth trove of Qabala treasures.
- Fossil animal footprints found at Laetoli, Tanzania.

== Events ==
- August 8: Founding of the modern Korean Archaeological Society, in Seoul, South Korea.
- August 27: Round Table removed from the wall of Winchester Castle in England for archaeological examination.

== Deaths ==
- July 22: Mortimer Wheeler, British archaeologist (b. 1890)
- November 1: Gustav Riek, German archaeologist (b. 1900)
- December 19: Neil Judd, American archaeologist (b. 1887)
