= 1975 in archaeology =

The year 1975 in archaeology involved some significant events.

== Explorations ==
- Architect Carlos Williams makes a detailed record of archaeological sites in the valley of Supe in Peru, including Caral.

== Excavations ==
- Five year project at Quiriguá begins, sponsored by the University of Pennsylvania, the National Geographic Society, and the government of Guatemala.
- National Museum of Korea and related institutions begin archaeological excavations at Songguk-ri, a prehistoric village that serves as the type-site for the material culture of the Middle Mumun Pottery Period in Korea (excavations continue periodically until the late 1990s).
- May & July - Rescue excavation at the site of a Newcomen atmospheric engine of c.1780 at Reelfitz Pit in Cumbria, England.

== Finds ==
- August 1 - The skull of KNM ER 3733, a woman of the species Homo ergaster who died around 1,750,000 BP, is discovered at the Koobi Fora Ridge near Lake Turkana in Kenya by Bernard Ngeneo. By August 9, the nearly intact skull will have been carefully unearthed.
- August
  - Hollow Dogū found on Hokkaido.
  - Wreck of Shinan ship found off the coast of South Korea.
- December 3 - Wreck of HMHS Britannic (sunk by mine 1916) is found in the Kea Channel by Jacques Cousteau.
- Monte Verde, a village site subsequently determined to be around 18,500 years BP, is found in southern Chile.
- Luzia Woman, the skeleton of a woman subsequently determined to be around 11,500 years BP, is found in Lapa Vermelha, Brazil, by Annette Laming-Emperaire.
- Cacaxtla murals.

== Events ==
- The discovery of Ciudad Perdida is announced by the government of Colombia.

== Publications ==
- Barbara Bender - Farming in Prehistory: from hunter-gatherer to food-producer.
- Douglas B. Hague and Rosemary Christie - Lighthouses: their architecture, history and archaeology.
- Adrian Oswald - Clay Pipes for the Archaeologist.

== Births ==
- Stine Rossel, Danish archaeologist (d. 2007)
- Elizabeth Frood, New Zealand-born Egyptologist

== Deaths ==
- September 9 - J. Eric S. Thompson, archaeologist, student of the Maya civilization (b. 1898)
