= 1991 in archaeology =

The year 1991 in archaeology involved some significant events.

== Excavations ==
- Dmanisi historic site, Georgia.
- November–December - Scar boat burial, Orkney.
- November 4 - An archaeological expedition is launched in France, eventually resulting in the discovery of a mass grave and identification of the body of the novelist Alain-Fournier, 77 years after his death as Lieutenant Henri-Alban Fournier in World War I.

== Finds ==
- July - Rock art at Cosquer cave in Cap Morgiou, France.
- September 19 - Ötzi the Iceman.
- September 25 - First fragment of Dmanisi hominins in Georgia.
- September - Fourteen Ancient Egyptian Boats (First Dynasty) identified at Abydos.
- Cuetlajuchitlán discovered in Mexico.
- Remains of monks at Mor Gabriel Monastery in Turkey killed by Timur's troops in 1401 are found in caves underneath the monastery.
- Cores and samples from a roof in Pueblo Bonito are dated to ca. A.D. 1082.
- Remains of British battlecruiser HMS Queen Mary in the North Sea.

== Publications ==
- Joan M. Gero and Margaret W. Conkey (ed.) - Engendering Archaeology: Women and Prehistory. Oxford: Blackwell. ISBN 0-631-16505-3
- Richard Hodges - Wall-to-Wall History: the Story of Roystone Grange. London: Duckworth ISBN 0-7156-2342-7
- Charles D. Trombold and David W. Wagner - "Analysis of Prehistoric Roadways in Chaco Canyon Using Remotely Sensed Digital Data." Ancient Road Networks and Settlement Hierarchies in the New World. Cambridge University Press. ISBN 0-521-38337-4.
- Colin Renfrew and Paul Bahn - Archaeology: Theories, Methods and Practice. London: Thames and Hudson. ISBN 0-500-28147-5.

== Awards ==
- Archaeologist Colin Renfrew has created a life peer as Baron Renfrew of Kaimsthorn, of Hurlet in the District of Renfrew.

== Events ==
- Gulf War: The Basra Museum is extensively looted.

== Deaths ==
- January 18 - Clarence Hungerford Webb, American archaeologist (b. 1902)
- March 31 - A. W. Lawrence, English Classical archaeologist (b. 1900)
