= Lindow Woman =

Iron Age bog body from England

Coordinates: 53°19′23″N 2°16′11″W

- Died: Approximately 80–550 CE (aged 30–50)
- Resting place: British Museum, London
- Other name: Lindow I
- Known for: Partial bog body discovered on 13 May 1983 at Lindow Moss, near Wilmslow, Cheshire, England

Lindow Woman and Lindow I are the names given to the partial remains of a female bog body, discovered in a peat bog at Lindow Moss, near Wilmslow in Cheshire, England, on 13 May 1983 by commercial peat-cutters. The remains were largely a skull fragment, which was missing its jaw, but with soft tissue and hair attached. The remains were subsequently dated to the Roman period. The remains became more technically known as Lindow I after the discovery of other remains in the same bog, which were identified as Lindow Man or Lindow II in 1984 and Lindow III in 1987.

Before the skull of Lindow Woman was dated, it was assumed to be the skull of a local woman who had gone missing in 1961, Malika de Fernandez. Her husband, Peter Reyn-Bardt, had been under suspicion of murdering her, but no body had been found. He confessed to the crime as a result of the skull's discovery and was convicted as a result of his confession.

== Discovery ==
The individual now known as Lindow Woman was discovered on 13 May 1983 at Lindow Moss, near Wilmslow in Cheshire, England. Commercial peat cutters Andy Mould and Stephen Dooley were watching a conveyor carrying dried peat into a processing mill, removing pieces of wood and other material that could damage the machinery, when they noticed an unusual object about the size of a football. Mould initially thought it resembled a small black leather football.

Mould and Dooley removed the object from the conveyor and took it to peat works manager Ken Harewood. After the adhering peat was washed away, they realized that they had found part of a preserved human head. The lower jaw was missing, but skin, some hair and one eye remained visible.

== Murder investigation ==
The police were summoned to deal with the remains and suspected a crime. They launched a murder investigation. For over two decades Peter Reyn-Bardt, a local 57-year-old man, had been suspected of murdering his estranged wife, Malika de Fernandez, and of disposing of her body. When questioned, Reyn-Bardt assumed that the skull fragment came from his wife's body, and said, "It has been so long I thought I would never be found out." He admitted to strangling her, dismembering her body, and burying the remains in a drainage ditch.

Because the rest of the remains could not be found, Detective Inspector George Abbott sent the head to Oxford University for further study.

After the origins of the head were revealed, Reyn-Bardt withdrew his confession; despite this and the fact that no trace of Fernandez' body was found, he was brought to trial at Chester Crown Court in December 1983. At trial, he pleaded guilty to manslaughter. He told the jury that his estranged wife had come to the cottage where he lived with another man; that she had threatened to expose his homosexuality (still criminalized under British law at the time); and that his wife died during an argument over money. He said he could not recall how his wife died, but that he had no doubt he caused her death. The jury found him guilty of murder. He spent the rest of his life in prison.

== Condition ==
Only part of Lindow Woman's head was recovered from Lindow Moss in 1983. The remains consisted mainly of the skull, without the lower jaw, but some soft tissue and hair were still attached. The outer membrane of the skull had survived, and decomposed brain tissue remained inside the skull. Part of the left eye and its optic nerve could also be identified.

Although skin and muscle were present when the head was discovered, only the bony remains survived by the time they entered the collection of the British Museum in 1985. The surviving cranium is in two pieces and measures 180 millimetres (7.1 in) long and 132 millimetres (5.2 in) wide.

== Scientific study ==
Researchers used accelerator mass spectrometry to date collagen taken from the surviving skull bone. The test produced a radiocarbon age of 1740 ± 80 BP. In radiocarbon dating, BP means "Before Present" and is counted back from 1950, rather than from the year the remains were discovered.

When the result was converted into calendar dates, the skull was placed broadly between approximately 80 and 550 CE, a span of nearly five centuries. The finding confirmed that the remains were ancient and could not have belonged to Malika de Fernandez, who had disappeared in 1961.

Anthropological examination of the surviving skull identified the individual as probably female and estimated an age at death of between 30 and 50 years.

== Related finds ==
Another body was recovered in the area in 1987, and is referred to as Lindow III. It was headless and had a vestigial thumb. A theory described the killings of both Lindow I and II as ritual sacrifice attributed to the Celtic enclaves.

== See also ==
- List of bog bodies from Great Britain
