= Stine Rossel =

Danish archaeologist

Stine Rossel (4 January 1975 – 20 October 2007) was a Danish archaeologist. She was a postdoc and Instructor of Egyptology at the University of Copenhagen. Her interests included zooarchaeology, the effects of environmental change on animal use, and the rise of complex societies.

Stine carried out analysis of faunal materials from several important archaeological sites in Egypt, Turkey, Pakistan, and Sudan. She received her PhD in Anthropology from Harvard University in 2007, and her dissertation was entitled "The development of productive subsistence economies in the Nile Valley: Zooarchaeological analysis at El-Mahasna and South Abydos, Upper Egypt".

For many years she was involved archaeological investigations at Abydos, where she analyzed recovered faunal materials. Her contribution to this project includes an article published in the Proceedings of the National Academy of Sciences on the domestication of the donkey.

On 20 October 2007, while hiking in the White Mountains in New Hampshire, Rossel died in an accident. In her memory, the International Council of Archaeozoology has dedicated an adjudicated monetary award to be provided to a PhD student who attends the international conference once every four years.
