= Luxor statue cache =

Grouping of ancient Egyptian statues unearthed in 1989

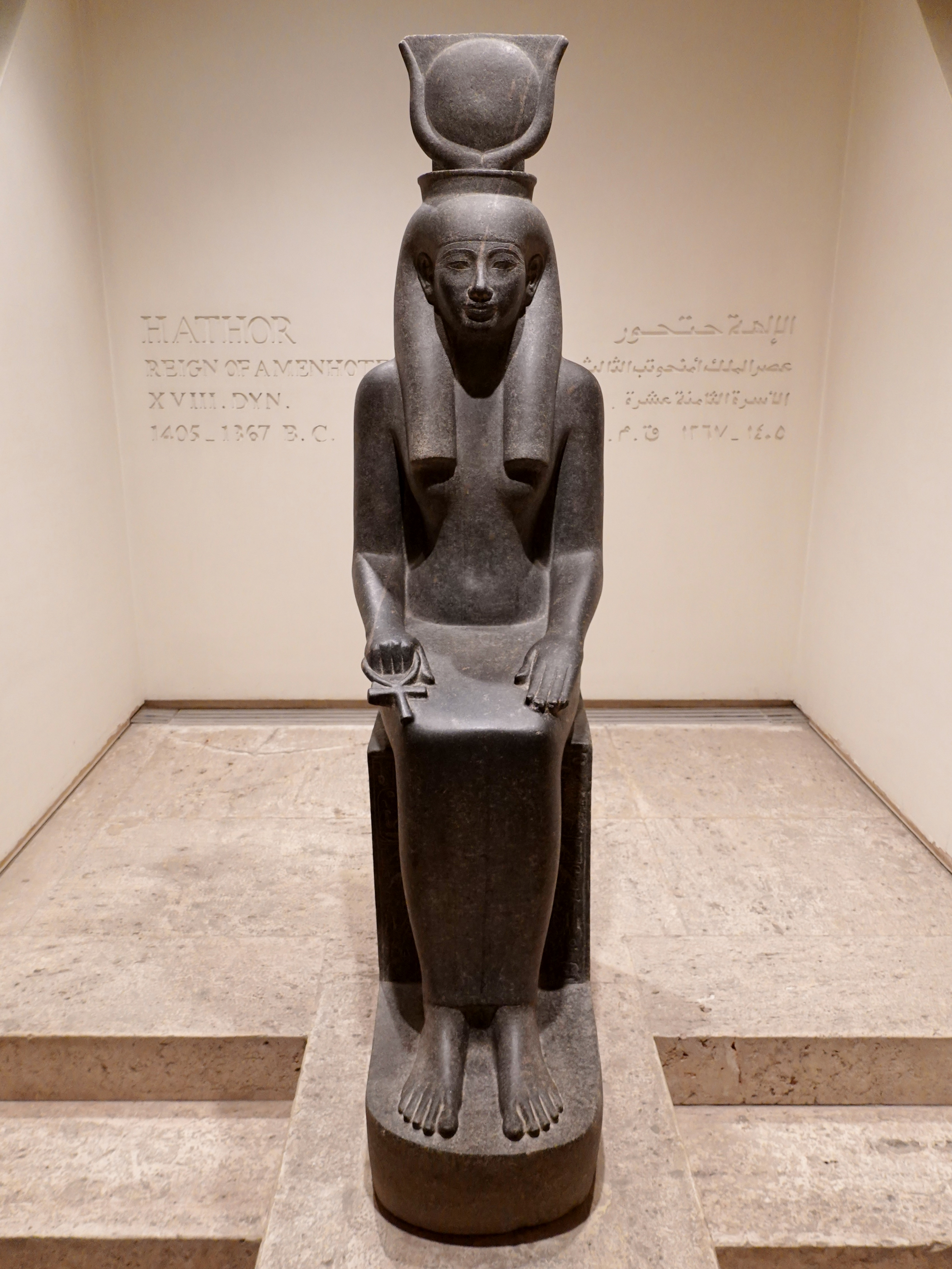
Seated statue of goddess Hathor

The Luxor statue cache is a grouping of ancient Egyptian statues unearthed in 1989. They were discovered in Luxor, beneath the solar court of the 18th Dynasty Pharaoh Amenhotep III.

== Partial list of statues ==
- Thutmose III as sphinx, alabaster, 1.095 metres (3 ft 7 in)
- Amenhotep III, standing, red quartzite, 2.49 metres (8 ft 2 in)
- the goddess Iunyt, seated, grey granite 1.45 metres (4 ft 9 in)
- Tutankhamun as sphinx, alabaster (with paint remains) 0.56 metres (1 ft 10 in)
- Horemheb, kneeling holding offering pots, diorite 1.91 metres (6 ft 3 in)
- Amun-Re-Kamutef serpent, grey granite 1.52 metres (5 ft 0 in)
- Amun-Re-Kamutef serpent, grey granite 1.00 metre (3 ft 3 in)
- Goddess Taweret, sandstone, 0.61 metres (2 ft 0 in)

== History ==
The excavation was launched in 1989 under the authority of Mahammed el-Saghir, with routine maintenance by the Luxor antiquities inspectorate. The Luxor cache was buried during the Roman conversion of the area into a military camp. Originally five statues were found at a three-foot depth below a covering layer of small stones; eventually 26 statues were uncovered with some being damaged prior to burial.

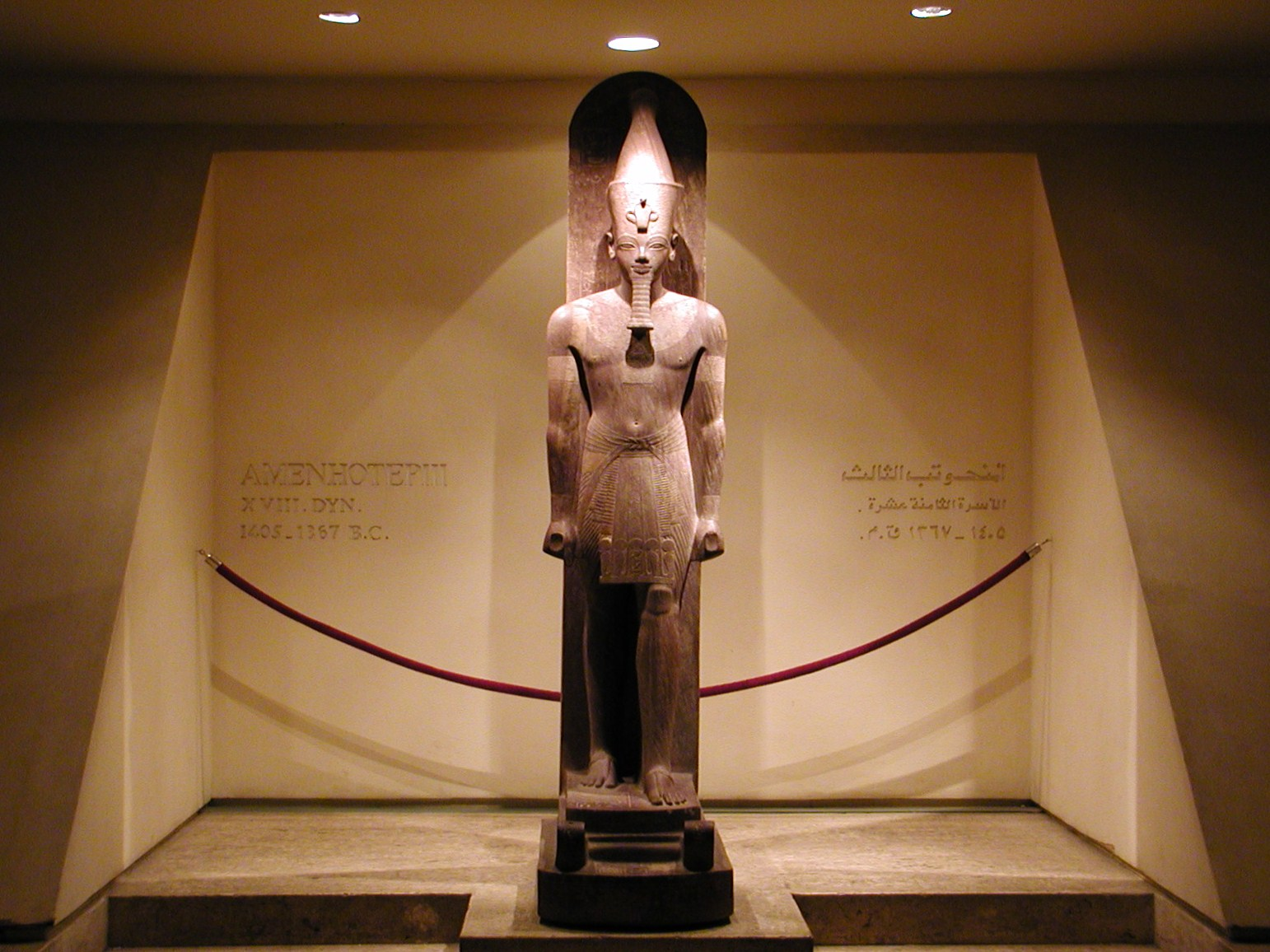
Amenhotep III standing upon Sled of God Tem (oldest creator god Atum)

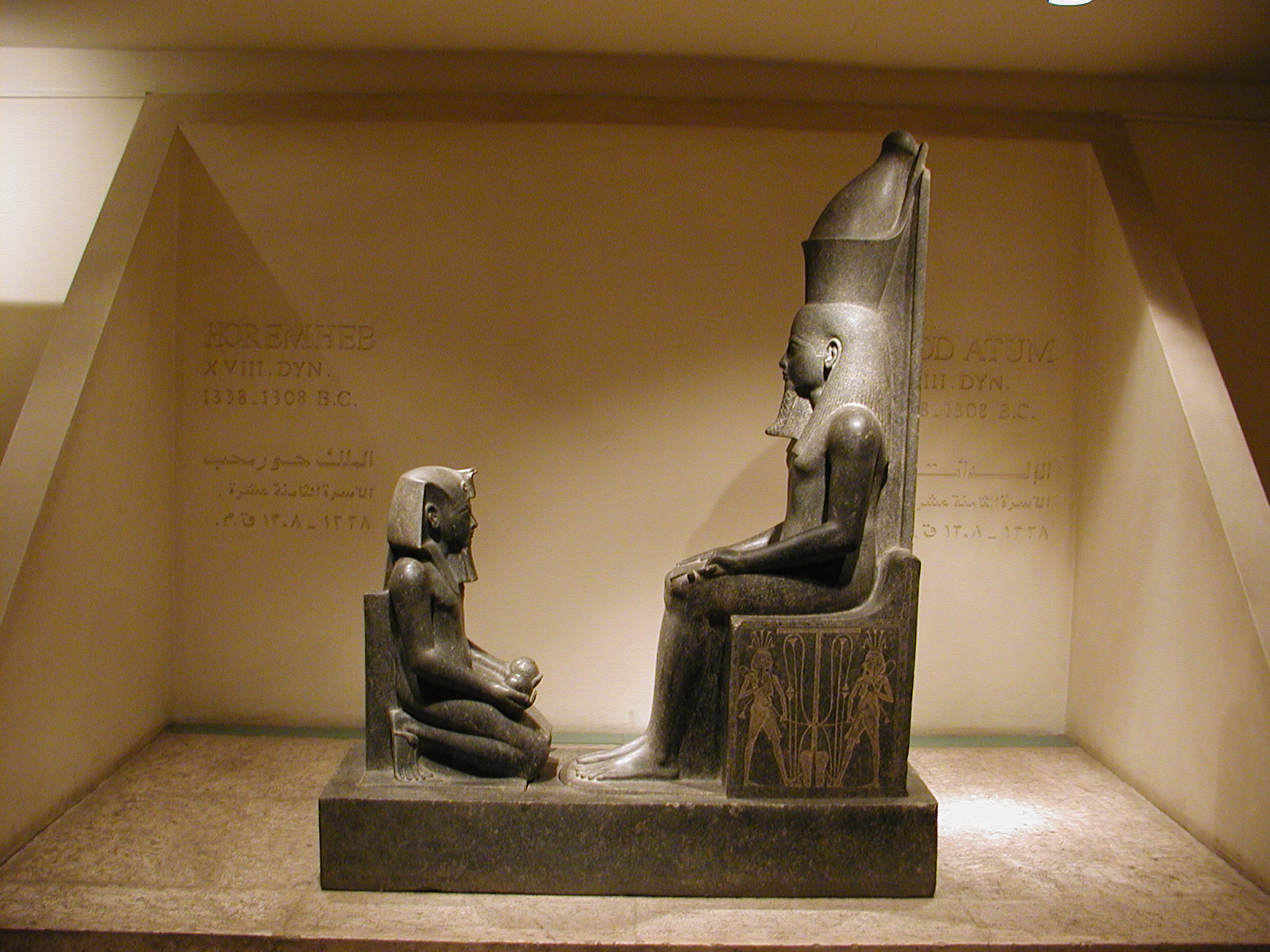
Horemheb kneeling
