= 1974 in archaeology =

The year 1974 in archaeology involved some significant events.

== Excavations ==
- January 19–20: New Zealand Railways K class (1877) steam locomotive K 88 Washington is recovered from the Branxholme locomotive dump in the Ōreti River.
- Project at Lamanai, Belize begins, directed by David M. Pendergast of the Royal Ontario Museum (continues through 1988).
- Excavation at Twann Bahnhof neolithic pile dwelling site in Switzerland begins (continues through 1976).
- Excavation of Panlongcheng Erligang culture site in China begins.
- Excavation conducted in Azokh Cave finding material from the Guruchay culture in Azerbaijan.

== Finds ==
- 26 February: 'Mungo Man', the skeleton of an individual subsequently determined to be around 40,000 years BP, discovered near Mungo Lake in New South Wales by Australian National University geomorphologist Dr. Jim Bowler.
- 29 March: Terracotta Army of Qin Shi Huang discovered at Xi'an, China.
- 4 April: High-status stone cist burial at Songguk-ri, Korea, containing Liaoning-style bronze dagger, greenstone ornaments and other prestige artifacts.
- 24 November: 'Lucy', the skeleton of a 3.2-million-year-old Australopithecus afarensis, discovered at Hadar, Ethiopia, in the Afar Depression.
- Roman villa "B" at Oplontis in Italy discovered.
- East Han Dynasty statue of Li Bing discovered at Dujiangyan Irrigation System.

== Publications ==
- Michael Aston and Trevor Rowley - Landscape Archaeology: an introduction to fieldwork techniques on post-Roman landscapes.
- Philip A. Rahtz (ed) - Rescue Archaeology.

== Miscellaneous ==
- Glyn Daniel is elected to the Disney Professorship of Archaeology in the University of Cambridge.

== Births ==
- October 28 - Andrew Birley, British archaeologist.

== Deaths ==
- May 18 - Ernest Nash, German-born student of Roman architecture and pioneer of archaeological photography (born 1898).
- October 1 - Spyridon Marinatos, Greek archaeologist of the Aegean Bronze Age (born 1901)
- December 21 - Alan Sorrell, English archaeological illustrator (born 1904).
