= Taur Ikhbeineh =

34th century BC archaeological site in Palestine

- Tour Ikhbeineh
- Shown within Palestine
- 31°27′13″N 34°24′51″E
- Periods: Bronze Age
- Associated with: Egyptians, Canaanites
- Location: Deir al-Balah Governorate, Palestine

Site notes
- Area: c. 1.0 hectare (2.5 acres), possibly up to 3.2 hectares (8 acres)
- Excavation dates: 1977, 1987
- Archaeologists: Ram Gophna; Eliezer Oren and Yuval Yekutieli
- Discovered: 1932
- Management: Ministry of Tourism and Antiquities

Taur Ikhbeineh was a prehistoric settlement in what is today the Gaza Strip, Palestine. It was inhabited in the 4th millennium BC at which point it was likely near an estuary of the Wadi Gaza. The site has suffered from erosion, but it covered at least 1.0 hectare (2.5 acres) and may have had peripheral areas of habitation nearby.

Though the settlement was abandoned in the Early Bronze Age, there were burials at Taur Ikhbeineh in the late 3rd or early 2nd millennium BC. Excavations in the 20th century provided evidence of interactions between Canaanite and Egyptian people. The settlement of Tell es-Sakan may have been established as a replacement for Taur Ikbeineh.

The site was discovered in 1932 and investigated by archaeologists in 1977 and 1987. In the early 21st century the site was used agriculturally, and it was damaged during the Gaza war.

== Location and topography ==
Taur Ikhbeineh is located 3 kilometres (1.9 mi) inland from Gaza's Mediterranean coast. When the site was established in the prehistoric period it was likely located near an estuary of the Wadi Gaza, and the coast was closer.

The extent of the site is uncertain though it is likely that it has been reduced by erosion over the millennia. Archaeological investigations identified three areas of activity (dubbed areas A, B, and C in the archaeological reports) within an area of 3.2 hectares (8 acres); area A was the main inhabited part and occupied an area of at least 1.0 hectare (2.5 acres) but it is unclear whether the three areas are part of the same settlement or whether areas B and C are peripheral to the main settlement.

== History ==
The history of Taur Ikhbeineh is understood from partial archaeological excavations. The investigations identified four phases of occupation dated through radiocarbon dating to the 34th century BC, during the Early Bronze Age I (the first part of the Early Bronze Age, referred to as EBI) (Note: Taur Ikhbeineh is sometimes referred to as a Chalcolithic site, see eg: Morhange et al. 2005. There are different naming schemes for this period, and the earliest part of EBI is sometimes considered to be Late Chalcolithic.) The EBI period saw the development of the first urban settlements.

The settlement was abandoned in the Early Bronze Age, though there were later prehistoric burials at Taur Ikhbeineh. Human remains were found at the site and broadly dated to the Early Bronze Age IV or Middle Bronze Age I periods based on pottery found with the burials (corresponding to 2500/2300BC–1750BC). The bones belonged to two individuals: an adult aged 20–30 and a 3-month-old infant. The burial practice was similar to the burials found at Tell el-Ajjul, a nearby Bronze Age settlement.

The earliest occupation layers at Taur Ikhbeineh, which dated to the 4th millennium BC, included evidence of Egyptian and Canaanite cultures interacting. Along with imported Egyptian pottery, archaeologists discovered locally produced material made with Egyptian and Canaanite techniques, assimilating Egyptian processes into local techniques. They hypothesised that there were two workshops either at Taur Ikhbeineh or in the area, with different groups producing different wares. Archaeologists Pierre de Miroschedji and Moain Sadeq suggest that Tell es-Sakan, a nearby Bronze Age settlement, may have been intended to replace Taur Ikhbeineh. Tell es-Sakan was a major fortified Egyptian settlement established around 3300 BC.

== Investigations and later history ==
The site was discovered in 1932, and investigated by Ram Gophna (Tel Aviv University) in 1977 and Eliezer Oren and Yuval Yekutieli (Ben Gurion University) in 1987, with surveys of the area and excavations conducted. Pottery discovered at Taur Ikhbeineh in the 1930s is in the Rockefeller Archeological Museum's collection.

In 2004 the site was used agriculturally. Since then, construction work has taken place nearby, along with clearances and the widening of the Salah al-Din Road which passed north-west of Taur Ikhbeineh. During the Israeli invasion of the Gaza Strip the area around Taur Ikhbeineh was affected by airstrikes. In late 2023, the Gaza Maritime Archaeology Project (GAZAMAP) used satellite imagery to identify a damaged building but the extent of the damage to the archaeological site could not be determined. A report based on observations between June and September 2024 concluded that Taur Ikhbeineh was severely damaged due to bombing and the use of bulldozers.

== See also ==
- List of archaeological sites in the Gaza Strip
- Naqada culture – culture in Egypt partly contemporary with Taur Ikhbeineh

== Bibliography ==
- Andreou, Georgia M. (2023). Gaza Maritime Archaeology Project (PDF) (Report). Honor Frost Foundation. Archived (PDF) from the original on 7 June 2024.
- Andreou, Georgia M.; Fradley, Michael; Blue, Lucy; Breen, Colin (2024). "Establishing a baseline for the study of maritime cultural heritage in the Gaza Strip" (PDF). Palestine Exploration Quarterly. 156 (1): 4–42. doi:10.1080/00310328.2022.2037923. ISSN 0031-0328.
- Centre for Cultural Heritage Preservation (January 2025). Damage and Risk Assessment of Cultural Heritage Under Attack in the Gaza Strip (PDF) (Report). State of Palestine Ministry of Tourism and Antiquities. Archived from the original (PDF) on 2025-07-29.
- Gophna, Ram (July 1978). "En-Bensor". Expedition Magazine. Vol. 20, no. 4.
- Horwitz, Liora Kolska; Tchernov, Eitan; Mienis, Henk K.; Hakker-Orion, Dalia; Bar-Yosef Mayer, Daniella (2002). "The archaeozoology of three Early Bronze Age sites in Nahal Besor, northwestern Negev". In van den Brink, Edwin C. M.; Yannai, Eli (eds.). In Quest of Ancient Settlement and Landscapes: Archaeological Studies in Honour of Ram Gophna. Ramot Publishing and Tel Aviv University. pp. 107–133.
- de Miroschedji, Pierre; Sadeq, Moain (2005), "The frontier of Egypt in the Early Bronze Age: preliminary soundings at Tell es-Sakan (Gaza Strip)", in Clarke, Joanne (ed.), Archaeological Perspectives on the Transmission and Transformation of Culture in the Eastern Mediterranean, Council for British Research in the Levant, pp. 155–169, JSTOR j.ctv310vqks.24
- Morhange, Christophe; Hamdan Taha, Mohamed; Humbert, Jean-Baptiste; Marriner, Nick (2005). "Human settlement and coastal change in Gaza since the Bronze Age". Méditerranée: Revue géographique des pays méditerranéens. 104 (104): 75–78. doi:10.4000/mediterranee.2252.
- Oren, Eliezer D.; Yekutieli, Yuval (1992). "Taur Ikhbeineh: Earliest Evidence for Egyptian Interconnections". In van den Brink, Edwin C. M. (ed.). The Nile Delta in Transition: 4th–3rd Millennium B.C. Tel Aviv: Israel Exploration Society. pp. 361–384.
- Sharon, Ilan (2013). "Levantine chronology". The Oxford Handbook of the Archaeology of the Levant. Oxford: Oxford University Press. pp. 44–65. doi:10.1093/oxfordhb/9780199212972.013.004. ISBN 978-0-19-921297-2.
