= 1993 in archaeology =

== Excavations ==
- Start of salvage excavations at Nevali Cori, to be flooded by dam.

== Finds ==
- March – British warship HMS Agamemnon (1781) (wrecked 1809) found at the mouth of the Río de la Plata.
- July – Fragment A of the Tel Dan Stele (9th–8th century BCE) is excavated in Israel.
- October 1 – Steamer Brother Jonathan (wrecked 1865) found off the coast of California.
- Portuguese nau Nossa Senhora dos Mártires (1605–06) found at the mouth of the Tagus.
- Rhinoceros horn spear end from 30,000 years BP found in Yana River delta, at the Yana Rhinoceros Horn Site.
- The Guodian Chu Slips, including the oldest known version of Laozi's Tao Te Ching and the previously lost Xing Zi Ming Chu, written on bamboo, are found in a tomb near Guodian, Jingmen (Hubei province of China) and dated before 300 BCE (later Warring States period).
- In Patara the Stadiasmus Patarensis is unearthed. The monumental milestone provides information on the Roman road network in the province of Lycia et Pamphylia, giving place names and distances.
- Remains of Homo heidelbergensis found at Eartham Pit, Boxgrove, England.

== Publications ==
- Barry Cunliffe – Wessex to AD 1000 (Longman).
- Sarah Milledge Nelson – The Archaeology of Korea (Cambridge University Press).
- Х. Тодорова, Иван Вайсов (H. Todorova, Ivan Vaisov) – "Новокаменната епоха в България" ("The Neolithic period in Bulgaria") (Издателство Наука и Изкуство (Science and Art Publishing House), Sofia).

== Events ==
- Conservators use a sonar probe mounted with two miniature video cameras to remove any remaining clay from inside the Riace bronzes.

== Deaths ==
- November 14 – Kim Won-yong, "father of Korean Archaeology", professor at Seoul National University (b. 1922).

== See also ==
- Mesa Verde
