= 1989 in archaeology =

The year 1989 in archaeology involved some significant events.

== Excavations ==
- Excavations are made at the Temple of Poseidon (near Corinth, also known as the Temple of Isthmia) by University of Chicago.
- Vimala Begley commences excavations at Arikamedu in Puducherry.
- Rescue excavation at Updown early medieval cemetery in Kent, England, led by Brian Philp, uncover 41 previously unexcavated graves.
- Monkey Marsh Lock, an 18th-century turf-sided lock on the Kennet and Avon Canal at Thatcham in southern England, is excavated and recorded prior to reconstruction.

== Finds ==
- January - Skeleton of Buhl Woman (c. 10,675 BP) found in Idaho.
- May - Wreck of PS Lady Elgin (sunk in collision 1860) discovered off Highwood, Illinois, by Harry Zych.
- June 8 - Wreck of German battleship Bismarck (scuttled in 1941) discovered in North Atlantic by Robert Ballard.
- Wreck of Roman grain-carrying ship Isis (c.150 CE) discovered off the coast of Sicily by Robert Ballard.
- Wreck of German Type UC II submarine SM UC-70 (depth-charged in 1918) discovered off the North Yorkshire coast of England.
- Yoshinogari Ruins discovered at Kanzaki, Kyūshū, Japan; goods and building are mainly Yayoi period.
- Remains of The Rose and Globe Theatres discovered in London.
- Luxor statue cache in courtyard of Amenhotep III's colonnade of the Temple of Luxor, including a 6 ft (1.8 m) pink quartzite statue of the king on a sled wearing the Double Crown.
- Laguna Copperplate Inscription found in the Philippines.
- Oldest known wing bone of the great auk found at Eartham Pit, Boxgrove in England.

== Publications ==
- Richard Hodges - The Anglo-Saxon Achievement: Archaeology & the Beginnings of English Society. Duckworth. ISBN 0-7156-2130-0
- Stuart Piggott - Ancient Britons and the Antiquarian Imagination: Ideas from the Renaissance to the Regency. Thames and Hudson. ISBN 0-500-01470-1.
