= 1977 in archaeology =

The year 1977 in archaeology involved some significant events.

== Explorations ==
- Survey at Taur Ikhbeineh, an Early Bronze Age settlement in the Gaza Strip, led by Ram Gophna

== Excavations ==
- Mario Pino and Tom Dillehay begins excavations at Monte Verde, Chile
- Excavations of the henge at Balfarg in Scotland, led by Roger Mercer, begin.
- Initial excavations take place at Daepyeong, a large Mumun Pottery Period (c. 1500-300 BC) settlement in Korea.

== Finds ==
- Tomb of Philip II of Macedon with a Vergina Sun is found at Vergina in Greece by Manolis Andronikos.
- Tomb of Marquis Yi of Zeng is found in China.
- The Lion of Al-lāt is found in Palmyra by Polish archeologists.

== Publications ==
- Mark Nathan Cohen - The Food Crisis in Prehistory: Overpopulation and the Origins of Agriculture (New Haven: Yale University Press)
- Bruce Robertson - Aviation Archaeology: a Collector's Guide to Aeronautical Relics (Cambridge, England: Patrick Stephens Ltd).
- Stanley South - Method and Theory in Historical Archaeology and Research Strategies in Historical Archaeology (editor)

== Events ==
- Stones at Stonehenge are fenced off to stop vandalism.

== Deaths ==
- George Willmot, British archaeologist and former curator of the Yorkshire Museum (b. 1908)
