= 1985 in archaeology =

The year 1985 in archaeology involved some significant events.

== Excavations ==
- April - Engine of SS Xantho (sunk 1872) recovered off Western Australia.
- June 21 - 1928 Scania truck (sunk 1936) recovered from Fryken in Sweden.
- September - British Vickers Wellington IA medium bomber N2980 (crashed 1940) recovered from Loch Ness in Scotland.

== Explorations ==
- Sagalassos (Turkey) surveyed.

== Finds ==
- July 20 - The main shipwreck site of the Spanish galleon Nuestra Señora de Atocha (which sank in 1622) is found 40 miles (64 km) off the coast of Key West, Florida by treasure hunters who soon begin to raise $400 million in coins and silver.
- September 1 - The shipwreck of the RMS Titanic (1912) in the North Atlantic is located by a joint American-French expedition led by Dr Robert Ballard (WHOI) and Jean-Louis Michel (Ifremer) using side-scan sonar from RV Knorr.
- October 13 - A hoard of coins of the Durotriges tribe is found in the rampart of Castle Rings, Wiltshire, England, an Iron Age hill fort, by a metal detectorist.
- Autumn - Rogozen Treasure: In the village of Rogozen, Vratsa Province, Bulgaria, tractor driver Ivan Dimitrov discovers 65 silver vessels in his garden. In 1986 archaeologists will discover a second hoard consisting of 100 vessels near the spot. Archaeologists date the treasure to the 5th-4th centuries BCE.
- Cosquer Cave found on the Mediterranean coast of France by diver Henri Cosquer; surviving cave paintings include Gravettian hand stencils and Solutrean animal paintings including a great auk, the earliest known depiction of a seabird.
- Wrecks of three Spanish Armada ships driven ashore in Autumn 1588, La Lavia, La Juliana, and Santa Maria de Vison, found at Streedagh Strand, north of Rosses Point on the west coast of Ireland.
- Shipwreck of Greek merchant ship of about 400 BCE found off Ma'agan Michael.
- Scar boat burial, Orkney.
- The Middleham Jewel, a 15th-century pendant, found on a pathway at Middleham Castle in Yorkshire (England).
- The oldest known representation of a cannon, a stone relief sculpture dated 1128, is discovered carved in the walls of Cave 149 of the Dazu Rock Carvings in Dazu, Chongqing, China.
- Discovery of a Roman amphitheatre at Guildhall, London.
- Milecastle 4 of Hadrian's Wall located in Newcastle upon Tyne, England.

== Publications ==
- Theresa A. Singleton (ed.) - The Archaeology of Slavery and Plantation Life.

== Events ==
- Ruins of Nan Madol in Micronesia declared a protected historic landmark.

== Deaths ==
- April 11: Olga Tufnell, English archaeologist of the Near East (born 1905)
- April 18: Gertrude Caton Thompson, English archaeologist of Africa (born 1888)
- December 5: A. Ledyard Smith, American archaeologist of the Americas (born 1901)
- December 18: Theresa Goell, American archaeologist of the Near East (born 1901)
