= 1987 in archaeology =

The year 1987 in archaeology involved some significant events.

== Excavations ==
- Amnya complex (from 6100 BCE) found and first excavated in Siberia.
- Wreck of SS Elbe (1881) (sank 1895) located and excavated off the coast of the Netherlands.
- Gaziantep Museum excavations at Zeugma.
- Excavation at Taur Ikhbeineh, an Early Bronze Age settlement in the Gaza Strip, led by Eliezer Oren and Yekutieli Yuval of Ben Gurion University

== Finds ==
- June 20 - Arkaim in Southern Ural.
- Hoards from Milton Keynes and surrounding area of Buckinghamshire, England: coins from Little Brickhill and Walton.
- Skeleton of a woman dating from over 4,250 years ago found in Achavanich, a megalithic structure in Caithness, Scotland.
- Dufuna canoe, the oldest known boat outside Europe, found in Nigeria.
- The Laguna Copperplate Inscription, the earliest known calendar-dated document (900) in the Philippines, is found.

== Publications ==
- Harding, A. F (1987). Henge Monuments and Related Sites of Great Britain: air photographic evidence and catalogue. BAR British series. Oxford: BAR. ISBN 0-86054-470-2.
- Renfrew, Colin (1987). Archaeology and Language: the puzzle of Indo-European origins. London: Cape. ISBN 0-224-02495-7.
- Merrifield, Ralph (1987). The Archaeology of Ritual and Magic. London: Guild Publishing. ISBN 0-7134-4870-9.

== Events ==
- December 8 - Chaco Culture National Historical Park is designated a UNESCO World Heritage Site.

== Deaths ==
- August 12 - Crystal Bennett, British archaeologist of Jordan (b. 1918)
