= Lindow Moss =

Bog in England

Coordinates: 53°19′22″N 02°16′10″W

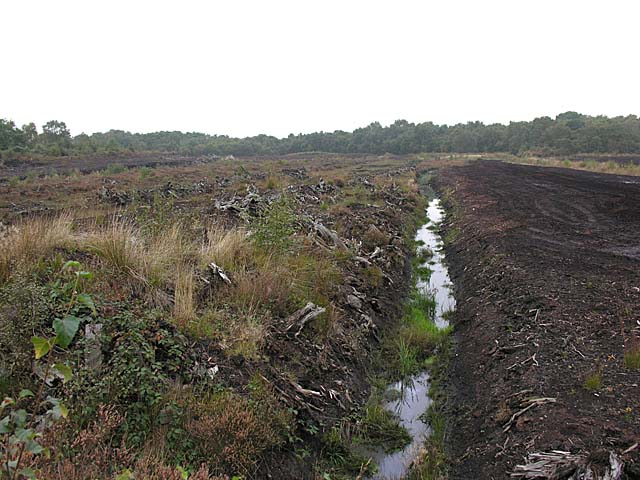
Lindow Moss peat workings in 2005

Lindow Moss, also known as Saltersley Common, is a raised mire peat bog on the edge of Wilmslow in Cheshire, England. It has been used as common land since the medieval period and is best known for the discovery of the preserved bog body of Lindow Man in 1984 as well as Lindow Woman the year before.

The peat bog was formed in a collection of hollows left by melting ice at the end of the last ice age. It is believed to have been a site of religious significance to the ancient Celts. The first written record of Lindow Moss was in 1421 when the lord of Mobberley and Wilmslow allowed people to dig peat from the mossland for use as fuel. It originally covered over 600 hectares (1,500 acres), but has since shrunk to a tenth of its original size. The bog can be a dangerous place; an 18th-century writer recorded people drowning there.

For centuries, peat from the bog was used as fuel, though extraction has now ceased.

The site is known for its flora and fauna such as hare's-tail cottongrass, common cottongrass and green hairstreak butterfly. It also has been a habitat for water voles although their continued existence is threatened by sinking water levels. The Saltersley Common Preservation Society promotes the preservation of the moss. In November 2011, they teamed up with a local amateur filmmaker to produce a short video detailing the history of the bog and some of the threats it faces.

== See also ==
- Lindow Common – adjacent SSSI
