= Lindow Man =

Bog body of an Iron Age man found in England

- Facial reconstruction of Lindow Man
- Died: Between 2 BC and 119 AD; Lindow Moss, Cheshire, England
- Cause of death: Violent death (blunt-force trauma, strangulation, possible throat cutting)
- Body discovered: August 1, 1984; Lindow Moss, near Wilmslow, Cheshire, England
- Other names: Lindow II; "Pete Marsh"
- Known for: Exceptionally preserved Iron Age/Romano-British bog body
- Height: 168–173 cm

Lindow Man, also known as Lindow II and (in jest) as Pete Marsh, is the preserved bog body of a man discovered in a peat bog at Lindow Moss near Wilmslow in Cheshire, North West England. The remains were found on 1 August 1984 by commercial peat cutters. Lindow Man is not the only bog body to have been found in the moss; Lindow Woman was discovered the year before, and other body parts have also been recovered. The find was described as "one of the most significant archaeological discoveries of the 1980s" and caused a media sensation. It helped invigorate the study of British bog bodies, which had previously been neglected.

Dating the body has proven problematic, but it is thought that he was deposited into Lindow Moss, face down, sometime between 2 BC and 119 AD, in either the Iron Age or Romano-British period. At the time of death, Lindow Man was a healthy male in his mid-20s, and may have been of high social status as his body shows little evidence of having done heavy or rough physical labour during his lifetime. There has been debate over the reason for his death; his death was violent and perhaps ritualistic.

The recovered body has been preserved by freeze-drying and is on permanent display at the British Museum, although it occasionally travels to other venues such as the Manchester Museum.

== Background ==
=== Lindow Moss ===
Lindow Moss is a peat bog in Lindow, an area of Wilmslow, Cheshire, which has been used as common land since the medieval period. It formed after the last ice age, one of many such peat bogs in north-east Cheshire and the Mersey basin that formed in hollows caused by melting ice. Investigations have not yet discovered settlement or agricultural activity around the edge of Lindow Moss that would have been contemporary with Lindow Man, but analysis of pollen in the peat suggests there was some cultivation in the vicinity.

Once covering over 600 hectares (1,500 acres), the bog has now shrunk to a tenth of its original size. It is a dangerous place and an 18th-century writer recorded people drowning there. For centuries, the peat from the bog was used as fuel, and it continued to be extracted until the 1980s, by which time the process had been mechanised. Lindow Moss is a lowland raised mire, a type of peat bog which often produces the best-preserved bog bodies, allowing more detailed analysis. Lowland raised mires occur mainly in northern England and extend south to the Midlands. Lindow Man is one of 27 bodies to be recovered from such areas.

=== Preservation of bog bodies ===
The preservation of bog bodies is dependent on a set of specific physical conditions, which can occur in peat bogs. A sphagnum moss bog must have a temperature lower than 4 °C (39 °F) at the time of deposition of the body. The subsequent average annual temperature must be lower than 10 °C (50 °F). Moisture must be stable in the bog year-round: it cannot dry out.

Sphagnum moss affects the chemistry of nearby water, which becomes highly acidic (a pH of roughly 3.3 to 4.5) relative to a more ordinary environment. The concentration of dissolved minerals also tends to be low. Dying moss forms layers of sediment and releases sugars and humic acids which consume oxygen. Since the surface of the water is covered by living moss, water becomes anaerobic. As a result, human tissues buried in the bog tend to tan rather than decay.

=== Lindow Woman ===
On 13 May 1983, two peat workers at Lindow Moss, Andy Mould and Stephen Dooley, noticed an unusual object—about the size of a football—on the elevator taking peat to the shredding machine. They removed the object for closer inspection, joking that it was a dinosaur egg. Once the peat had been removed, their discovery turned out to be a decomposing, incomplete human head with one eye and some hair intact.

Forensics identified the skull as belonging to a European woman, probably aged 30–50. Police initially thought the skull was that of Malika Reyn-Bardt, who had disappeared in 1960 and was the subject of an ongoing investigation. While in prison on another charge, her husband, Peter Reyn-Bardt, had boasted that he had killed his wife and buried her in the back garden of their bungalow, which was on the edge of the area of mossland where peat was being dug. The garden had been examined but no body was found. When Reyn-Bardt was confronted with the discovery of the skull from Lindow Moss, he confessed to the murder of his wife.

The skull was later radiocarbon dated, revealing it to be nearly 2,000 years old. "Lindow Woman", as it became known, dated from around 210 AD. This emerged shortly before Reyn-Bardt went to trial, but he was convicted on the evidence of his confession.

== Discovery ==
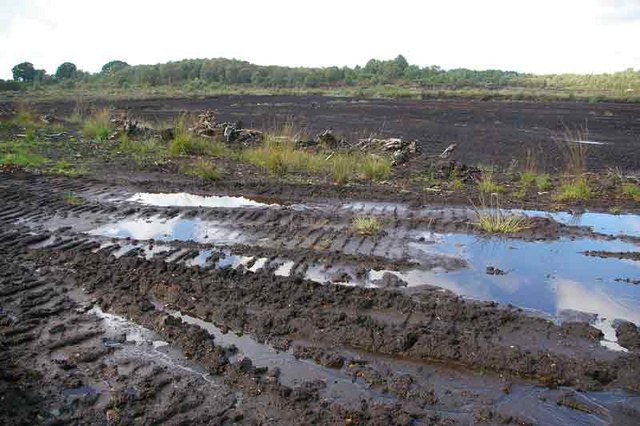
The area of Lindow Moss where Lindow Man was discovered

A year later, a further discovery was made at Lindow Moss, just 250 m (820 ft) southwest of the Lindow Woman. On 1 August 1984, Andy Mould, who had been involved in the discovery of Lindow Woman, took what he thought was a piece of wood off the elevator of the peat-shredding machine. He threw the object at Eddie Slack, his workmate. When it hit the ground, peat fell off the object and revealed it to be a human foot. The police were called, and the foot was taken away for examination.

At the same time Rachel Pugh, a trainee journalist for The Wilmslow World, was tipped off about the discovery. At the urging of her editor, she cycled out to the site of the discovery and persuaded the two men to show her where the foot had been excavated. Recognising the possible historical significance of the find, she told the diggers to stop work at once, and alerted Rick Turner, the Cheshire County Archaeologist, who subsequently succeeded in finding the rest of the body, which later became known as Lindow Man. Some skin had been exposed and had started to decay, so to prevent further deterioration of the body, it was re-covered with peat. The complete excavation of the block containing the remains was performed on 6 August. Until it could be dated, it was moved to the Macclesfield District General Hospital for storage. As the body of Malika Reyn-Bardt had still not been found, it was initially thought possible the body might be hers, until it was determined to be male, and radiocarbon dated.

The owners of the land where Lindow Man was found donated the body to the British Museum, and on 21 August it was transported to London. At the time, the body was dubbed "Pete Marsh" by Middlesex Hospital radiologists, a name subsequently adopted by local journalists, as was the similar "Pete Bogg".

Lindow Man's official name is Lindow II, as there are other finds from the area: Lindow I (Lindow Woman) refers to a human skull, Lindow III to a "fragmented headless body", and Lindow IV to the upper thigh of an adult male, possibly that of Lindow Man. After the discovery of Lindow Man, there were no further archaeological excavations at Lindow Moss until 1987. A large piece of skin was found by workmen on the elevator on 6 February 1987. On this occasion, the police left the investigation to the archaeologists. Over 70 pieces were found, constituting Lindow III. Although the bone was not as well preserved as that of Lindow Man, the other tissues survived in better condition. The final discovery was that of Lindow IV on 14 June 1988. Part of a left leg and buttocks were found on the elevator, from a site just 15 metres (50 ft) west of where Lindow Man was found. Nearly three months later, on 12 September, a right thigh was discovered in the peat on the bucket of a digger. The proximity of the discovery sites, coupled with the fact that the remains were shown to come from an adult male, means that Lindow IV is probably part of Lindow Man.

== Clothing and associated items ==
When Lindow Man was discovered in 1984 at Lindow Moss in Cheshire, England, he was wearing only a fox-fur band around his left arm. Remains of this armband survived attached to his body.

A twisted cord made from animal sinew, the tough tissue that connects muscle to bone, was also found around his neck. According to the British Museum, the cord may have been used as a garrotte to strangle him, although it could instead have been worn as a necklace.

== Remains and investigation ==
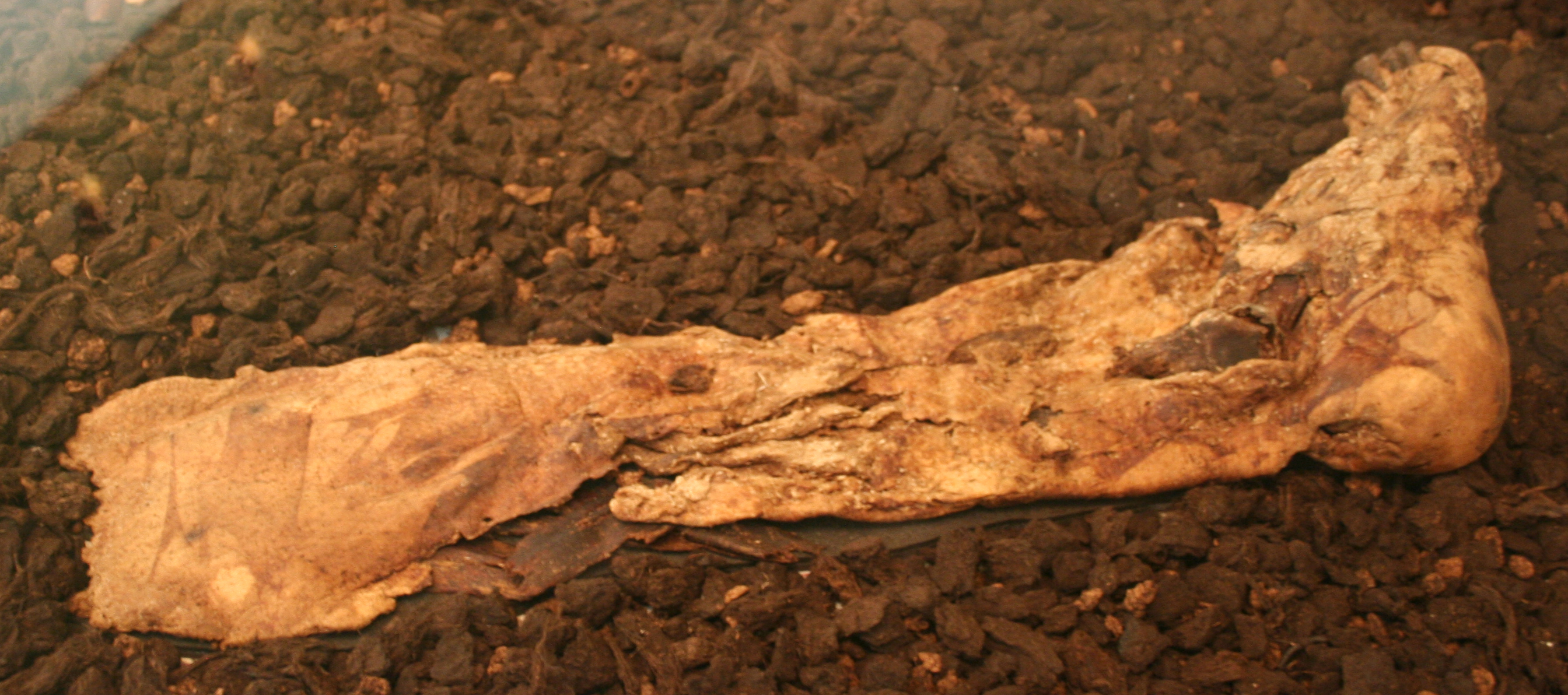
Lindow Man's right foot

=== Archaeological significance ===
Lindow Man marked the first discovery in Britain of a well-preserved bog body; its condition was comparable to that of Grauballe Man and Tollund Man from Denmark. Before Lindow Man was found, it was estimated that 41 bog bodies had been found in England and Wales and 15 in Scotland. Encouraged by the discovery of Lindow Man, a gazetteer was compiled, which revealed a far higher number of bog bodies: over 85 in England and Wales and over 36 in Scotland. Before the discovery of the bodies in Lindow Moss, British bog bodies had been a relatively neglected subject compared to European examples. The interest caused by Lindow Man led to more in-depth research of accounts of discoveries in bogs since the 17th century; by 1995, the numbers had changed to 106 in England and Wales and 34 in Scotland. The remains covered a large timeframe.

=== Physical description and forensic analysis ===
In life, Lindow Man would have been between 168 cm (5 ft 6 in) and 173 cm (5 ft 8 in) tall and weighed about 60 kilograms (132 lb). It was possible to ascertain that his age at death was around the mid-20s. The body retains a trimmed beard, moustache, and sideburns of brown hair, as well as healthy teeth with no visible cavities, and manicured fingernails, indicating he did little heavy or rough work. (Note: Lindow Man's hair is currently red because of chemical changes caused by the bog in which he was buried; however, his hair was probably originally dark brown.) When he died, Lindow Man was suffering from slight osteoarthritis and an infestation of whipworm and maw worm. As a result of the decalcification of the bones and pressure from the peat under which Lindow Man was buried, his skull was distorted. While some preserved human remains may contain DNA, peat bogs such as Lindow Moss are generally poor for such a purpose, and it is unlikely that DNA could be recovered from Lindow Man.

Lindow Man and Lindow III were found to have elevated levels of copper on their skin. The cause for this was uncertain as there could have been natural causes, although a study by Pyatt et al. proposed that the bodies may have been painted with a copper-based pigment. To test this, skin samples were taken from places likely to be painted and tested against samples from areas where painting was unlikely. It was found that the copper content of the skin of the torso was higher than the control areas, suggesting that the theory of Pyatt et al. may have been correct. However, the conclusion was ambiguous as the overall content was above that expected of a male, and variations across the body may have been due to environmental factors. Similarly, green deposits were found in the hair, originally thought to be a copper-based pigment used for decoration, but it was later found to be the result of a reaction between the keratin in the hair and the acid of the peat bog.

=== Dating ===
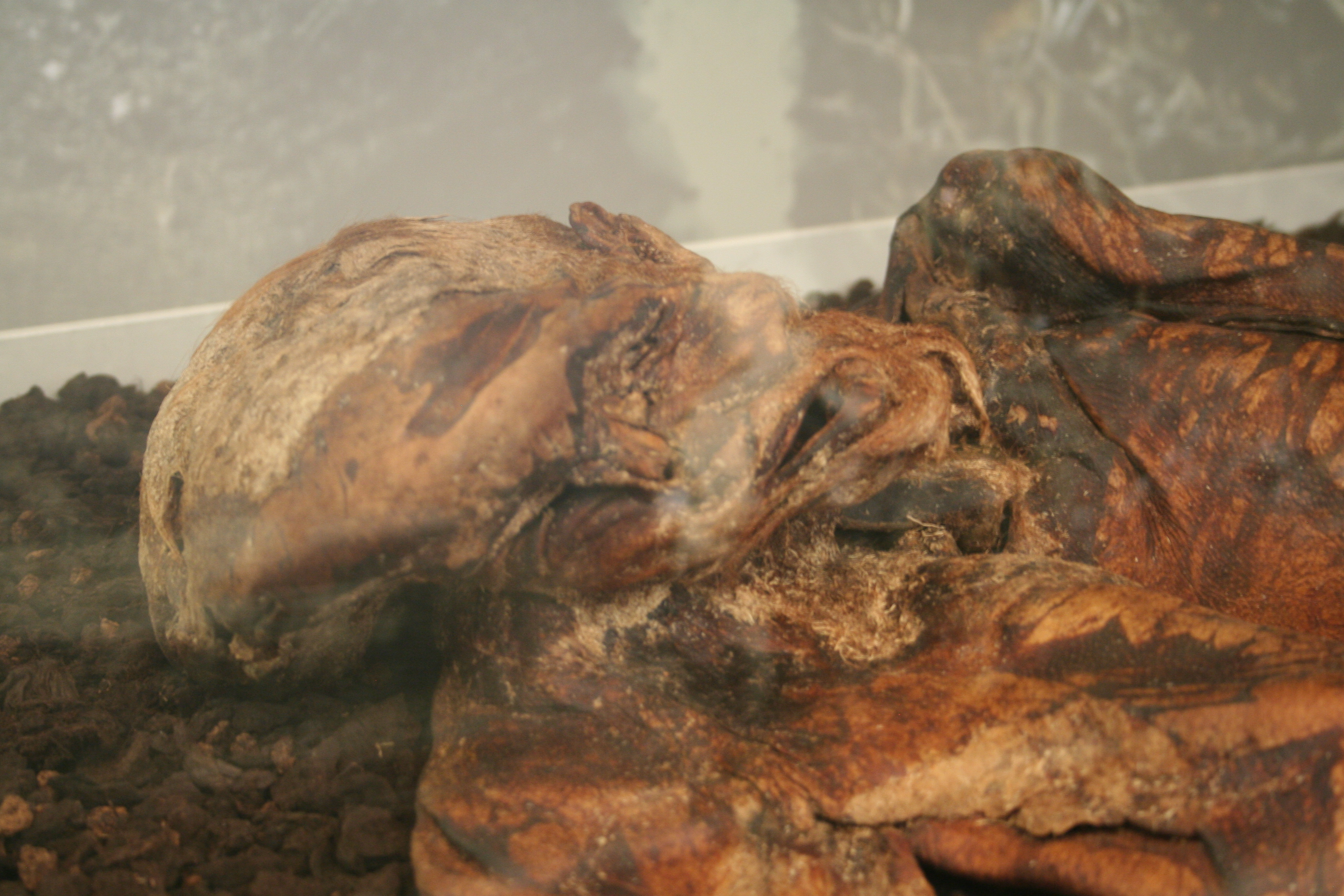
Lindow Man's face

Dating Lindow Man is difficult as samples from the body and surrounding peat have produced dates spanning a 900-year period. Although the peat encasing Lindow Man has been radiocarbon dated to about 300 BC, Lindow Man himself has a different date. Early tests at different laboratories returned conflicting dates for the body; later tests suggested a date between 2 BC and 119 AD. There has been a tendency to ascribe the body to the Iron Age period rather than Roman because of the interpretation that Lindow Man's death may have been a ritual sacrifice or execution. Explanations for why the peat in which he was found is much older have been sought. Archaeologist P. C. Buckland suggests that as the stratigraphy of the peat appears undisturbed, Lindow Man may have been deposited into a pool that was already some 300 years old. Geographer K. E. Barber has argued against this hypothesis, saying that pools at Lindow Moss would have been too shallow, and suggests that the peat may have been peeled back to allow the burial and then replaced, leaving the stratigraphy apparently undisturbed.

=== Last meal ===
Lindow Man's last meal was preserved in his stomach and intestines and was analysed in some detail. It was hoped that investigations into the contents of the stomach would shed light on the contemporary diet, as was the case with Grauballe Man and Tollund Man in the 1950s. The analysis of the contents of the digestive system of bog bodies had become one of the principal endeavours of investigating such remains.

Analysis of the grains present revealed Lindow Man's diet to be mostly of cereals. He probably ate slightly charred bread, although the burning may have had ritual significance rather than being an accident. Some mistletoe pollen was also found in the stomach, indicating that Lindow Man died in March or April.

Archaeologists continue to consider what this simple meal might mean. Sophia Adams of the British Museum describes it as an unseasoned barley cake, a common Iron Age food. Some scholars, following the work of Anne Ross, suggest that burnt pieces of griddle cake may have been used in selection rituals similar to drawing lots. If so, the charred portion in Lindow Man's meal could signal that he was chosen for a specific role.

Other researchers focus on the mixed seeds and plant fragments in the cake. Miranda Aldhouse-Green notes that the ingredients came from several locations, which may have been meant to represent control over a wider landscape or the area involved in the ritual. She also points out that the same evidence could mean something else, such as a plain or intentionally demeaning final meal.

Mistletoe pollen provides another clue. Ross linked it to ritual mistletoe practices associated with ancient religious groups, while Aldhouse-Green notes that mistletoe was seen as a calming or medicinal plant. It may have been given to Lindow Man to steady him or make him more compliant before his death.

One of the conclusions of the study was that the people buried in Lindow Moss may have had a less varied diet than their European counterparts. According to Jody Joy, curator of the Iron Age collection at the British Museum, the importance of Lindow Man lies more in how he lived rather than how he died, as the circumstances surrounding his demise may never be fully established.

== Cause of death ==
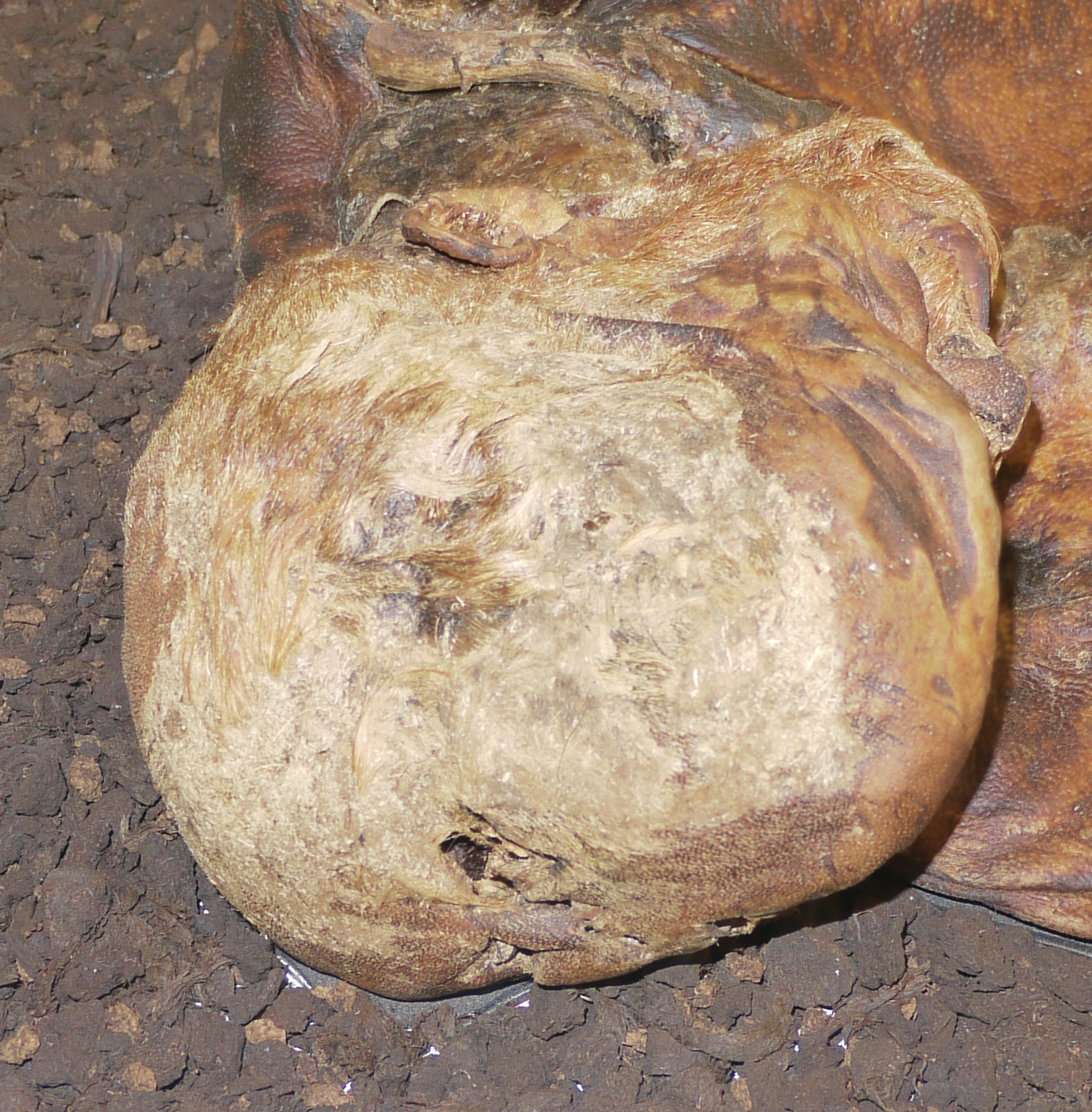
The top of the Lindow Man's head. The V-shaped cut can be seen at the lower centre.

As the peat was cleaned off the body in the laboratory, it became clear that Lindow Man had suffered a violent death. The injuries included a V-shaped, 3.5 centimetres (1.4 in) cut on top of his head; a possible laceration at the back of the head, ligature marks on the neck where a sinew cord was found, a possible wound on the right side of the neck, a possible stab wound in the upper right chest, a broken neck, and a fractured rib. Xeroradiography revealed that the blow on top of the head (causing the V-shaped cut) was caused by a relatively blunt object; it had fractured the skull and driven fragments into the brain. Swelling along the edges of the wound indicated that Lindow Man had lived after being struck. The blow, possibly from a small axe, would have caused unconsciousness, but the victim could have survived for several hours afterwards. The ligature marks on the neck were caused by tightening the sinew cord found around his neck, possibly a garrotte or necklace.

The body's state of decay means that it is not possible to confirm whether some injuries took place before or after death. This is the case for the wound in the upper right chest and the laceration on the back of the skull. The cut on the right of the neck may have been the result of the body becoming bloated, causing the skin to split, but the straight edges of the wound suggest that it may have been caused by a sharp instrument, such as a knife. The ligature marks on the neck may have occurred after death. In some interpretations of Lindow Man's death, the sinew is a garrotte used to break the victim's neck. However, Robert Connolly, a lecturer in physical anthropology, suggests that the sinew may have been ornamental and that ligature marks may have been caused by the body swelling when submerged. The rib fracture may also have occurred after death, perhaps during the discovery of the body, but is included in some narratives of the Lindow Man's death. The broken neck would have proven the fatal injury, whether caused by the sinew cord tightening around the neck or by blows to the back of the head. After death, Lindow Man was deposited into Lindow Moss face down.

== Hypothesis ==
Archaeologist Don Brothwell considered that many of the older bodies need re-examining with modern techniques, such as those used in the analysis of Lindow Man. The study of bog bodies, including those found in Lindow Moss, has contributed to a wider understanding of well-preserved human remains, helping to develop new methods of analysis and investigation. The use of sophisticated techniques, such as computed tomography (CT) scans, has marked the investigation of the Lindow bodies as particularly important. Such scans allow the reconstruction of the body and internal examination. Of the 27 bodies recovered from lowland raised mires in England and Wales, only those from Lindow Moss and the remains of Worsley Man have survived, together with a shoe from another body. The remains have a date range from the early 1st to the 4th centuries. Investigation into the other bodies relies on contemporary descriptions of the discovery.

The physical evidence allows a general reconstruction of how Lindow Man was killed, although some details are debated, but it does not explain why he was killed. In North West England, there is little evidence for religious or ritual activity in the Iron Age period. What evidence does survive is usually in the form of artefacts recovered from peat bogs. Late Iron Age burials in the region often took the form of a crouched inhumation, sometimes with personal ornaments. Although dated to the mid-1st century AD, the type of burial of Lindow Man was more common in the pre-historic period. In the latter half of the 20th century, scholars widely believed that bog bodies demonstrating injuries to the neck or head area were examples of ritual sacrifice. Bog bodies were associated with Germanic and Celtic cultures, specifically related to head worship.

According to Brothwell, Lindow Man is one of the most complex examples of "overkill" in a bog body, and possibly has ritual meaning as it was "extravagant" for a straightforward murder. Archaeologists John Hodgson and Mark Brennand suggest that bog bodies may have been related to religious practice, although there is division in the academic community over this issue. In the case of Lindow Man, scholars debate whether the killing was murder or done as part of ritual. Anne Ross, an expert on Iron Age religion, proposed that the death was an example of human sacrifice and that the "triple death" (throat cut, strangled, and hit on the head) was an offering to several different gods. The wide date range for Lindow Man's death (2 BC to 119 AD) means he may have met his demise after the Romans conquered northern England in the 60s AD. As the Romans outlawed human sacrifice, such timing would open up other possibilities. This conclusion was emphasised by historian Ronald Hutton, who challenged the interpretation of sacrificial death. Connolly suggests that as Lindow Man was found naked, he could have been the victim of a violent robbery.

Joy said

The jury really is still out on these bodies, whether they were aristocrats, priests, criminals, outsiders, whether they went willingly to their deaths or whether they were executed – but Lindow was a very remote place in those days, an unlikely place for an ambush or a murder

According to Anne Ross, an archaeologist and scholar of Celtic history, and Don Robins, a chemist at the University of London, Lindow Man was likely a sacrifice victim of extraordinary importance. They identified his stomach contents as including the undigested remains of a partially burned barley griddle cake of a kind used by the ancient Celts to select victims for sacrifice. Such cakes were torn into fragments and placed in a sack, after which all candidates for sacrifice would withdraw a piece, with the one withdrawing the burnt piece being the one who would be sacrificed. They argued that Lindow Man was likely a high-ranking Druid who was sacrificed in a last-ditch effort to call upon the aid of three Celtic gods to stop a Roman offensive against the Celts in AD 60.

== Conservation ==
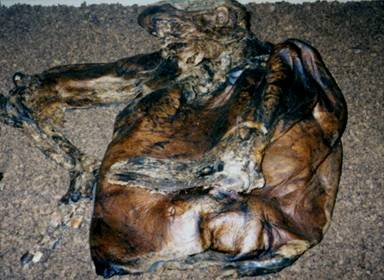
Lindow Man on display at the British Museum in 1996

Environment and situation are the crucial factors that determine how corpses decay. For instance, corpses will decay differently depending on the weather, the way they are buried, and the medium in which they are buried. Peat slows the decay of corpses. It was feared that, once Lindow Man was removed from that environment, which had preserved the body for nearly 2,000 years, the remains would rapidly start to deteriorate, so steps were taken to ensure preservation. After rejecting methods that had been used to maintain the integrity of other bog bodies, such as the "pit-tanning" used on Grauballe Man, which took a year and a half, scientists settled on freeze-drying. In preparation, the body was covered in a solution of 15% polyethylene glycol 400 and 85% water to prevent it from becoming distorted. The body was then frozen solid and the ice vaporised to ensure Lindow Man did not shrink. Afterwards, Lindow Man was put in a specially constructed display case to control the environment, maintaining the temperature at 20 °C (68 °F) and the humidity at 55%.

== Public reception ==
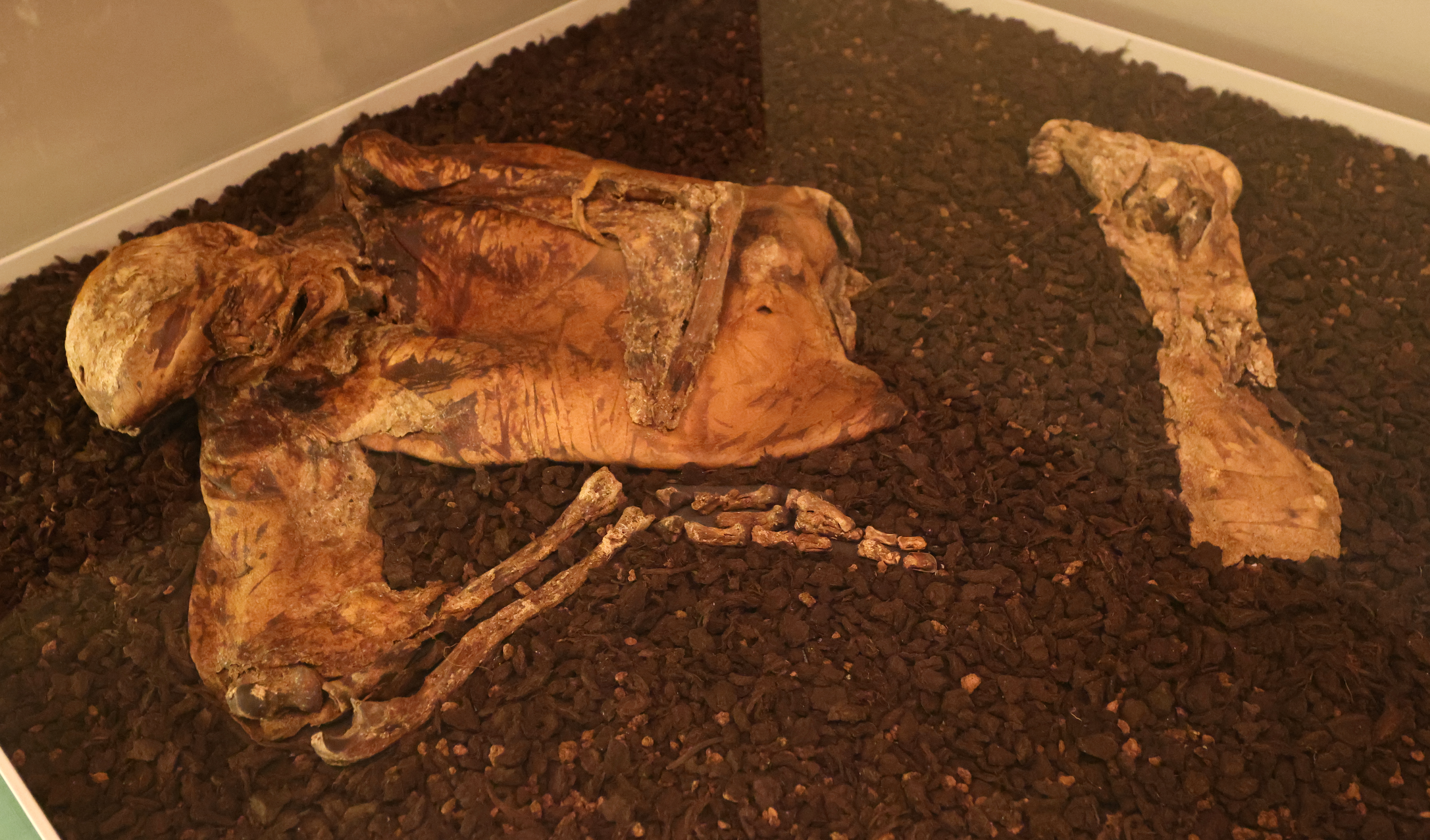
Lindow Man on display at the British Museum in 2023

The discovery of Lindow Man in 1984 at Lindow Moss in Cheshire, England, received worldwide news coverage. Newspapers adopted the nickname "Pete Marsh", while scientists investigating his remains called him Lindow Man. In April 1985, a documentary about the investigation in the BBC television series Q.E.D. was watched by more than 10 million people.

His first temporary exhibition at Manchester Museum in 1987 attracted up to 2,000 visitors a day. During the exhibition, local resident Barbara O'Brien led a campaign for his remains to stay permanently in North West England. The campaign gained support from local members of Parliament and attracted coverage in local and national newspapers. In November 1987, pupils at Lindow Primary School recorded O'Brien's song, "Lindow Man We Want You Back Again". The campaign was unsuccessful, and the British Museum retained the remains.

The Manchester Museum exhibition of 2008–2009 presented different perspectives on Lindow Man through personal accounts from people involved in his discovery and study, museum curators, a local resident and a pagan contributor. According to museum curator Bryan Sitch, public responses were mixed but broadly favourable. Some visitors questioned the inclusion of a pagan viewpoint alongside scientific interpretations, while others criticised the design or wanted more factual information. Visitors left thousands of comment cards and personal offerings, which the museum collected for further study. The exhibition also contributed to debate about whether human remains should be displayed. Manchester Museum organised a public discussion, "Should We Display the Dead?", which considered both Lindow Man and the Body Worlds exhibition then showing elsewhere in the city.

A study by curators Jody Joy and Julia Farley examined 69 enquiries about Lindow Man received by British Museum curators between 2009 and 2018. Questions about the ethics of displaying his remains came mainly from students researching dissertations; none of the enquiries classified as coming from the general public raised that issue. Public enquiries instead tended to concern his life, death and scientific investigation. The authors distinguished these interests from the ethical questions prominent in academic and museum discussions.

== Exhibition ==
Lindow Man is held in the collection of the British Museum in London, where his remains were first publicly displayed in July 1986 as part of the exhibition Archaeology in Britain. In 1997, they were moved to the museum's Iron Age gallery.

His remains have also been loaned to other museums for temporary exhibitions. Manchester Museum displayed him in 1987, 1991 and from 19 April 2008 to 19 April 2009. The 2008–2009 exhibition, Lindow Man: A Bog Body Mystery, won the award for Best Archaeological Innovation at the 2010 British Archaeological Awards. His remains were subsequently exhibited at the Great North Museum in Newcastle upon Tyne from August to November 2009, before returning to the British Museum.

== Cultural references ==
British archaeologist and anthropologist Don Brothwell's The Bog Man and the Archaeology of People provides an account of the modern scientific techniques employed to conserve and analyse Lindow Man. Celtic history, language and lore scholar Anne Ross and archaeological chemist Don Robins's The Life and Death of a Druid Prince provides an account of the circumstances surrounding Lindow Man's life and death, in part hypothesising that he had lived as a highborn, perhaps even as a druid who was sacrificed to the gods at the time of the Menai Massacre and Boudica's rebellion.

== See also ==
- List of bog bodies from Great Britain
