= 1980 in science =

The year 1980 in science and technology involved some significant events, listed below.

== Astronomy and space exploration ==
- February 16 – A total solar eclipse is seen in North Africa and West Asia.
- March 1 – The Voyager 1 probe confirms the existence of Janus, a moon of Saturn.
- October 3 – The main-belt asteroid 2404 Antarctica is discovered by Czech astronomer Antonín Mrkos.
- November 12 – Voyager program: The NASA space probe Voyager I makes its closest approach to Saturn when it flies within 77,000 miles (124,000 km) of the planet's cloud-tops and sends the first high resolution images of the world back to scientists on Earth.

== Chemistry ==
- John B. Goodenough, working with colleagues at the University of Oxford Inorganic Chemistry Laboratory, identifies the cathode material that enables development of the rechargeable lithium-ion battery.
- Royal Society of Chemistry formed by merger of the Royal Institute of Chemistry, the Chemical Society, the Faraday Society and the Society for Analytical Chemistry, with headquarters in London.

== Computer science ==
- May 22 – The arcade game Pac-Man is released in Japan.
- June 23 – Tim Berners-Lee begins work on ENQUIRE, the system that will lead to the creation of the World Wide Web a decade later.
- July – Microsoft's Bill Gates agrees to create an operating system for the new IBM Personal Computer. In September, David Bradley becomes one of the "original 12" engineers working on the project (under Don Estridge) and is responsible for the ROM BIOS code and for developing the Control-Alt-Delete command.
- September – The "Chinese room" argument is introduced in a paper by John Searle.
- September 30 – Digital Equipment Corporation, Intel and Xerox introduce the DIX standard for Ethernet, which is the first implementation outside of Xerox and the first to support 10 Mbit/s speeds.
- Atari release a conversion of the hit arcade game Space Invaders for the Atari 2600 which popularises the home video game console.
- Usenet established at the University of North Carolina at Chapel Hill and Duke University.
- Convolutional neural networks are introduced in a paper by Kunihiko Fukushima.

== Geophysics ==
- May 18 – The 1980 eruption of Mount St. Helens volcano in Washington (state) kills 57, including American volcanologist David A. Johnston.
- June 6 – Luis and Walter Alvarez with Frank Asaro and Helen Michels propose the Alvarez hypothesis, that the mass extinction of the dinosaurs was caused by the impact of a large asteroid 66 million years ago, the Cretaceous–Paleogene extinction event.
- October 10 – The 7.1 M_{w} El Asnam earthquake shakes northern Algeria with a maximum Mercalli intensity of X (Extreme), killing 2,633–5,000.
- November 23 – The 6.9 M_{w} Irpinia earthquake shakes southern Italy with a maximum Mercalli intensity of X (Extreme), killing 2,483–4,900.

== History of science and technology ==
- Voprosy istorii estestvozhaniyi i tekhniki ("Questions of the history of science and technology") begins publication under the auspices of the Academy of Sciences of the Union of Soviet Socialist Republics.

== Medicine ==
- May 8 – Global eradication of smallpox certified by the World Health Organization.
- August 28 – First clinically useful image of a patient's internal tissues using magnetic resonance imaging (MRI) is obtained using a full-body scanner built by a team led by John Mallard at the University of Aberdeen.
- December – First successful human heart transplantation to use the immunosuppressant cyclosporine.
- Global campaign to eradicate Dracunculiasis (Guinea worm disease) begins at the U.S. Centers for Disease Control and Prevention.
- The much-enlarged third edition of the American Psychiatric Association's Diagnostic and Statistical Manual of Mental Disorders (DSM-III), produced under the control of Robert Spitzer, is published.
- First commercial MRI whole body scanner manufactured by Oxford Instruments for installation at Hammersmith Hospital, London.

== Paleontology ==
- First four (ankle) bones of "Little Foot" (Stw 573), a nearly complete young female Australopithecus fossil skeleton capable of walking upright are found in the cave system of Sterkfontein, South Africa, eventually dated at around 3.67 million years BP but not identified at this time.

== Physics ==
- German physician Klaus von Klitzing, working at the high magnetic field laboratory in Grenoble with silicon-based samples developed by Michael Pepper and Gerhard Dorda, makes the unexpected discovery that the Hall conductivity is exactly quantized, the Quantum Hall effect.

== Technology ==
- English watchmaker George Daniels patents the coaxial escapement.

== Zoology ==
- The Cooloola monster, an orthopteran, is discovered in Queensland, Australia.

== Other events ==
- January 6 – Global Positioning System time epoch begins at 00:00 UTC.

== Awards ==
- Nobel Prizes
  - Physics – James Watson Cronin, Val Logsdon Fitch
  - Chemistry – Paul Berg, Walter Gilbert, Frederick Sanger
  - Medicine – Baruj Benacerraf, Jean Dausset, George D. Snell
- Turing Award – C. A. R. Hoare

== Births ==
- January 31 – Dan Milisavljevic, Canadian astronomer.
- November 22 – Shawn Fanning, American computer programmer.
- Victoria Herridge, British palaentologist.

== Deaths ==
- January 2 – Alexandra Illmer Forsythe (b. 1918), American computer scientist.
- January 3 – Joy Adamson (b. 1910), Silesian-born Kenyan wildlife conservationist (murdered).
- January 8 – John Mauchly (b. 1907), American co-inventor of the ENIAC computer.
- February 1 – Toshiko Yuasa (b. 1909), Japanese-born nuclear physicist.
- February 7 – Secondo Campini (b. 1904), Italian jet engine pioneer.
- March 18 – Ludwig Guttmann (b. 1899), German-born British neurologist and pioneer of paralympic games.
- May 28 – Rolf Nevanlinna (b. 1895), Finnish mathematician.
- June 18 – Kazimierz Kuratowski (b. 1896), Polish mathematician.
- July 1 – C. P. Snow (b. 1905), English physicist and novelist.
- August 5 – Joachim Hämmerling (b. 1901), German-born Danish biologist.
- August 29 – Franco Basaglia (b. 1924), Italian psychiatrist.
- October 18 – Hans Ferdinand Mayer (b. 1895), German physicist.
- October 21 – Hans Asperger (b. 1906), Austrian pediatrician.
- October 31 – Elizebeth Smith Friedman (b. 1892), American cryptanalyst.
- November 4 – Elsie MacGill (b. 1905), Canadian aeronautical engineer, "Queen of the Hurricanes".
- December 16 – Hellmuth Walter (b. 1900), German-born mechanical engineer and inventor.
