= 1982 in archaeology =

The year 1982 in archaeology involved some significant events.

== Events ==
- Archaeological Museum of Olympia opens in Greece.
- Eindhoven Museum founded as an archaeological open-air museum in the Netherlands.

== Excavations ==
- October 11 - Hull of Tudor navy ship Mary Rose raised from the Solent.
- The Chaco Project ends at Chaco Canyon (begun 1971).

== Finds ==
- March - Wreck of HMS Swift (1763) located in Puerto Deseado on the Atlantic coast of Patagonia.
- May 12 - Coppergate Helmet found in York, England.
- NASA's Thermal Infrared Multispectral Scanner (TIMS) detects over 200 miles of a precolumbian (900 CE or 1000 CE) road system in Chaco Canyon, as well as walls, buildings and agricultural fields.
- Uluburun shipwreck discovered.

== Publications ==
- A. F. Harding (ed.) - Climatic Change in Later Prehistory ISBN 0-85224-425-8
- Richard Hodges - Dark Age Economics: the Origins of Towns and Trade, A.D. 600-1000 ISBN 0-7156-1531-9
- Roger Moorey - A Century of Biblical Archaeology ISBN 0-7188-2825-9

== Deaths ==
- September 18 - Pei Wenzhong, founding father of Chinese anthropology, buried at Peking Man Site in Zhoukoudian, China (b. 1904).
- October - Michael J. O'Kelly, Irish archaeologist (b. 1915).
