= 1981 in archaeology =

The year 1981 in archaeology involved some significant events.

== Explorations ==
- June
  - Owen Beattie of the University of Alberta begins the 1845–48 Franklin Expedition Forensic Anthropology Project (FEFAP) on King William Island to trace Franklin's lost expedition.
  - Start of archaeological survey seeking Beothuk sites on the northeast coast of Newfoundland which locates that at Boyd's Cove.
- Late ice age tools found in inland Tasmania.
- Location of the wreck of Portuguese carrack St Anthony in 1527 on The Lizard, Cornwall, England, is identified.
- Full photographic survey of the wreck of the Breadalbane in the Northwest Passage.

== Excavations ==
- September - Excavation of the Trinchera Dolina at the archaeological site of Atapuerca in northern Spain begins.
- Ain Ghazal is discovered during road construction outside Amman, Jordan.
- Excavation of Etruscan (or Greek) shipwreck of c. 600 BCE off Isola del Giglio, Italy, directed by Mensun Bound, begins.

== Publications ==
- David Burgess-Wise - Automobile Archaeology (Cambridge, England: Patrick Stephens Ltd).
- Derek Roe - The Lower and Middle Palaeolithic Periods in Britain (London: Routledge & Kegan Paul).

== Finds ==
- Ceremonial decorated bronze Celtic Agris Helmet found in a cave near Agris in southwestern France.
- Wreck of RMS Republic (1903) located off Nantucket by Captain Martin Bayerle.
- Wreck of HMS Formidable (1898) located off the south west coast of England.
- Undley bracteate found near Lakenheath in eastern England.
- Gold bar found in Mexico City, subsequently confirmed as made of material appropriated during the Spanish conquest of the Aztec Empire and presumably abandoned by the Spanish at the time of La Noche Triste in 1520.

== Events ==
- June 12 - Film Raiders of the Lost Ark, featuring fictional 1930s archaeologist Indiana Jones, is released.
- Colin Renfrew is elected to the Disney Professorship of Archaeology in the University of Cambridge.
- Riace bronzes are put on show in Italy for the first time since their discovery in 1972.

== Births ==
- Fadel al-Utol, Palestinian archaeologist
