= 1986 in archaeology =

The year 1986 in archaeology involved some significant events.

== Excavations ==
- Foundations of the Colossus of Nero in Rome.
- British Supermarine Spitfire Mark 1a fighter aircraft N3200 recovered from the beach at Sangatte in France.

== Finds ==
- January 6 - The second half of the Rogozen Treasure is found by archaeologists from the museum in Vratsa, Bulgaria.
- July 18 - First sacrificial pit at Sanxingdui in China found, leading to extensive investigation of the site.
- La Mojarra Stela 1.
- Wreck of HMS A1, the first British submarine casualty (1904), discovered in Bracklesham Bay by local fisherman.
- A fragment of Livy's Ab Urbe Condita Libri is found in Egypt.
- The Umm ar-Rasas mosaics found at Umm ar-Rasas, Jordan.

== Publications ==
- John McK. Camp - The Athenian Agora: excavations in the heart of classical Athens. London: Thames and Hudson. ISBN 0-500-39021-5
- Abraham de la Pryme (1672–1704) - A History of Kingston upon Hull. Kingston upon Hull City Council and Malet Lambert High School. ISBN 0-904767-12-4
- Pramod B. Gadre - Cultural Archaeology of Ahmadnagar during Nizam Shahi period, 1494–1632. Delhi: B.R. Publishing Corporation.
- Arlene Miller Rosen - Cities of Clay: the geoarcheology of tells. University of Chicago Press. ISBN 0-226-72626-6
- Henrieta Todorova (Хенриета Тодорова) - Каменно -медната епоха в България ("The Eneolithic period in Bulgaria"). Sofia.

== Events ==
- July 8 - Protection of Military Remains Act passed in the United Kingdom.
- November - First UNESCO World Heritage Sites in Great Britain designated: Durham Castle and Cathedral; Ironbridge Gorge; Studley Royal Park (including the ruins of Fountains Abbey); Stonehenge, Avebury and Associated Sites; and Castles and Town Walls of King Edward in Gwynedd (Wales).

== Deaths ==
- January 10 - Emil Forrer, Swiss Assyriologist and Hittitologist (b. 1894)
- December 13 - Glyn Daniel, Welsh-born archaeologist (b. 1914)
