= 2005 in archaeology =

List of years in archaeology	(table)
- … 1995; 1996; 1997; 1998; 1999; 2000; 2001; 2002; 2003; 2004; 2005; 2006; 2007; 2008; 2009; 2010; 2011; 2012; 2013; 2014; 2015 …
- In science 2002 2003 2004 2005 2006 2007 2008
- Art; Archaeology; Architecture; Literature; Music; Philosophy; Science; +...

This page lists major events of 2005 in archaeology.

== Excavations ==
- May–September - Dutch East India Company ship Rooswijk (1740) on the Goodwin Sands.
- July - Renewed excavation at Street House Anglo-Saxon cemetery in north east England.
- Workers' barrack at site of Mount Lowe Railway in California.

== Exploration ==
- Survey of the site of the naval Battle of the Aegates begins.

== Publications ==
- Mark P. Leone - The Archaeology of Liberty in an American Capital: Excavations in Annapolis.
- Adrienne Mayor - Fossil Legends of the First Americans.
- Reynolds, A. C., Betancourt, J. L., Quade, J., Patchett, P. J., Dean, J. S., and Stein, J. "87Sr/86Sr sourcing of ponderosa pine used in Anasazi Great House construction at Chaco Canyon, New Mexico." Journal of Archaeological Science 32 pp. 1061–1075.

== Finds ==
- February - Newark Torc discovered in England.
- March - Discovery of KV63, the first tomb in the Valley of the Kings found since 1922.
- May - Statue of Nike at Tadmor.
- June - Archaeologists excavating the Templo Mayor site in Tenochtitlan (modern-day Mexico City) discover a rare child sacrifice to the Aztec war god Huitzilopochtli. The child's body was given a ceremonial burial in a seated position, probably around 1450 in a cornerstone-laying ceremony to mark the building a new portion of the temple (announced July 22).
- August - Large Stone Structure, remains of a large 10th to 9th century BCE public building in East Jerusalem, believed by the excavator to be perhaps remains of the Palace of David.
- Megiddo church, remains of a 3rd-century Christian church, the earliest found in the country, near Tel Megiddo in northern Israel.
- A bone figurine of a bird 2 cm long is found at Lingjing in Henan province of China; it is subsequently dated at 13,500 BCE, making it 8,500 years older than any other known sculpture from east Asia.
- A gold wreath from Thrace is found in Bulgaria.

== Events ==
- April 18 - The bodies of thirty British Royal Navy officers and sailors discovered in 2000 on Nelson's Island are buried in a naval ceremony in Alexandria, Egypt. Dating from the Battle of the Nile (1798) and another battle three years later, only one body, that of Commander James Russell, can be positively identified.
- April 20 - The first part of the Obelisk of Axum is returned to Ethiopia. It was taken to Rome in 1937 on Mussolini's orders.

== Deaths ==
- July 15 - Anders Hagen, Norwegian archaeologist (b. 1921)
- November 21 - Aileen Fox, English archaeologist (b. 1907).

== See also ==
- List of years in archaeology
- Abydos - site of table of Egyptian pharaoh names.
- Pompeii
- Mayapan
