= 2000 in archaeology =

List of years in archaeology	(table)
- … 1990; 1991; 1992; 1993; 1994; 1995; 1996; 1997; 1998; 1999; 2000; 2001; 2002; 2003; 2004; 2005; 2006; 2007; 2008; 2009; 2010 …
- In science 1997 1998 1999 2000 2001 2002 2003
- Art; Archaeology; Architecture; Literature; Music; Philosophy; Science; +...

The year 2000 in archaeology included many events, some of which are listed below.

== Excavations ==
- June – excavations at al-Moghraqa, a Middle Bronze Age former settlement in Palestine, as part of the Gaza Research Project.
- International excavations of the Middle Stone Age occupation cave sites at Pinnacle Point near Mossel Bay in South Africa begin.
- Excavation and restoration of Mor Yakup Church in Turkey begins.
- Re-excavation of tomb KV32 in Egypt's Valley of the Kings begins.

== Finds ==
- March – Railway viaduct of c.1790 at Blaenavon in south Wales unearthed.
- Spring – Clive Cussler's National Underwater and Marine Agency discovers the wreck of RMS Carpathia (sunk 1918) 120 mi (190 km) west of Fastnet Rock.
- May – Wreckage of the Lockheed F-5B Lightning reconnaissance aircraft flown by Antoine de Saint-Exupéry at the time of his death in 1944 is discovered in the Mediterranean Sea off Marseille.
- May 15 – A steam locomotive and 15 dump cars from Panama Canal French construction attempts, 1881–1894, are recovered from the bed of Gatun Lake.
- September – Egyptian archeologists announce the discovery of more than 100 mummies – some from 500 BC and most from Roman time – in the Valley of the Golden Mummies.
- November 19 – Hallaton Treasure found in Leicestershire, England, comprising over 5,000 silver and gold coins, mostly of the Corieltauvi, the Hallaton Helmet and other metal objects from around the time of the Roman conquest of Britain.
- December 7 – Kadisoka temple is discovered in Sleman, Yogyakarta, Indonesia.
- On Nelson's Island off the coast of Alexandria, Egypt, Italian archaeologist Dr. Paolo Gallo uncovers a group of graves dating from the 1798 Battle of the Nile. The graves contain the remains of British Royal Navy officers, sailors, and marines, as well as women and children.
- Shang dynasty road discovered at Anyang Aero Sports School near Yinxu, the ancient capital of China.
- Kakinoshima site located in Japan.
- Girl of the Uchter Moor in Germany.
- Milton Keynes Hoard in England.
- Gevninge helmet fragment in Denmark.
- Wreck of Russian cruiser Pallada (1906) off the coast of Finland.

== Events ==
- August 8 – Wreck of Confederate submarine H. L. Hunley is raised in South Carolina.
- November 5 – Shinichi Fujimura is exposed as having planted forged Paleolithic artefacts at Japanese sites by the Mainichi Shimbun newspaper.

== Publications ==
- Wayne D. Cocroft – Dangerous Energy: the archaeology of gunpowder and military explosives manufacture. London: English Heritage. ISBN 1-85074-718-0
- James Cuno – Who Owns Antiquity? – museums and the battle over our ancient heritage. Princeton University Press. ISBN 978-0-691-13712-4
- A. F. Harding – European Societies in the Bronze Age. Cambridge University Press. ISBN 0-521-36477-9
- Richard Hodges – Towns and Trade in the Age of Charlemagne. London: Duckworth. ISBN 0-7156-2965-4
- Adrienne Mayor – The First Fossil Hunters: paleontology in Greek and Roman times. Princeton University Press. ISBN 0-691-05863-6
- Mark Redknap – Vikings in Wales: an archaeological quest. Cardiff: National Museums & Galleries of Wales. ISBN 0-7200-0486-1
- Colin Renfrew and K. V. Boyle (ed.) – Archaeogenetics: DNA and the population prehistory of Europe. Cambridge: McDonald Institute for Archaeological Research. ISBN 1-902937-08-2
- Michael Stratton and Barrie Trinder – Twentieth Century Industrial Archaeology. London: E & FN Spon. ISBN 0-419-24680-0
- Richard J. A. Talbert (ed.) – Barrington Atlas of the Greek and Roman World. Princeton University Press. ISBN 0-691-03169-X

== Deaths ==
- January 11 – Timothy W. Potter, English archaeologist (b. 1944)
- November 25 – James Deetz, American anthropologist and historical archaeologist (b. 1930)

== See also ==
- Pompeii – computerized digital photographs.
