= Timeline of archaeology, 2000s =

Chronology of archaeology from 2000 to 2010

== 2000 ==
=== Finds ===
- On Nelson's Island off the coast of Alexandria, Egypt, Italian archaeologist Dr. Paolo Gallo uncovers a group of graves dating from the 1798 Battle of the Nile. The graves contain the remains of British Royal Navy officers, sailors, and marines, as well as women and children.

=== Miscellaneous ===
- 8 August: Wreck of Confederate submarine CSS H. L. Hunley raised

== 2001 ==
=== Excavations ===
- Grinnell College project at Mayapan
- Excavations at Cival directed by Dr. Francisco Estrada-Belli

=== Deaths ===
- 29 March: Helge Ingstad, Norwegian explorer; co-discoverer of Viking artifacts at L'Anse aux Meadows

== 2002 ==
=== Finds ===
- Mask of la Roche-Cotard
- 3,500-year-old human remains found in the Citadel of Damascus
- June: Newport ship

=== Publications ===
- Thebes tablets

=== Miscellaneous ===
- Brief reappearance and study of Seaton Carew Wreck

== 2003 ==
=== Finds ===
- Royal saxon tomb in Prittlewell

== 2004 ==
=== Finds ===
Salcombe B underwater archaeological site identified from Bronze Age finds discovered on the Salcombe Cannon Wrecksite

=== Miscellaneous ===
- Albert Goodyear of the University of South Carolina Institute of Archaeology and Anthropology announces that radiocarbon dating at the Topper Site dated to approximately 50,000 years ago, or approximately 37,000 years before the Clovis culture
- Graeme Barker elected to the Disney Professorship of Archaeology in the University of Cambridge

== 2005 ==
=== Excavations ===
- Rare child sacrifice to war god at Tenochtitlan Archaeologists excavating the Templo Mayor site in Tenochtitlan (modern-day Mexico City) announced on 22 July the discovery of a rare child sacrifice to Huitzilopochtli, the war god of the Aztecs. The find was unusual because Huitzilopochtli was usually honored with hearts or skulls from adult warrior sacrifices, and child sacrifices were usually to Tlaloc, the rain god. The find was especially valuable because the remains of the child were found whole, and with whistles, collars, ankle bracelets of shell and copper bells, items usually found at ceremonial burials.
  Archaeologists believe that the sacrifice took place around 1450 in a cornerstone-laying ceremony to mark the building a new layer of the temple (new layers were added about once every 52 years). An Associated Press article remarked that:
  "Priests propped the child in a sitting position, his legs splayed out in front of him, and workers packed sand and clay around his body, which was then covered beneath a flight of stone temple steps...the find came almost by accident last month, as archaeologists dug a test trench at the edge of a temple on the crossroads of two major thoroughfares in the ancient city of Tenochtitlan, the name the Aztecs gave to the city they founded in 1325. About a yard below the surface, they saw the top of a tiny skull."

=== Publications ===
- Reynolds, A. C., Betancourt, J. L., Quade, J., Patchett, P. J., Dean, J. S., and Stein, J. (2005). "87Sr/86Sr sourcing of ponderosa pine used in Anasazi Great House construction at Chaco Canyon, New Mexico." Journal of Archaeological Science 32, 1061-1075.

=== Finds ===
- May: Statue of Nike at Tadmor
- March: Discovery of the first tomb in the Valley of the Kings since 1922
- August: the alleged Palace of David site is the remains of a large 10th to 9th century BC public building in East Jerusalem

=== Miscellaneous ===
- On 18 April, the bodies of 30 British Royal Navy officers and sailors discovered in 2000 on Nelson's Island are buried in a naval ceremony in Alexandria, Egypt. Dating from the 1798 Battle of the Nile and another battle three years later, only one body, that of Commander James Russell, can be positively identified.

== 2006 ==
=== Explorations ===
- Tomb of the Roaring Lions

=== Excavations ===
- KV63

=== Finds ===
- The Irish Bog Psalter contains the fragments of a prayer book found in a bog in Ireland, where it has been for an estimated 1200 years.

=== Miscellaneous ===
- The Kharosti scrolls, the oldest collection of Buddhist manuscripts in the world, are radiocarbon dated by the Australian Nuclear Science and Technology Organisation (ANSTO). The group confirms the initial dating of the Senior manuscripts to 130-250 A.D. and the Schøyen manuscripts to between the first and fifth centuries A.D.

== See also ==
- List of archaeological excavations by date
- Timeline of archaeology
