= Carlo Gallavotti =

Italian philologist (1909–1992)

- Born: 23 January 1909; Cesena, Romagna, Kingdom of Italy
- Died: 9 February 1992 (aged 83); Rome, Lazio, Italy
- Occupation: University professor
- Known for: Critical edition of Theocritus, Aristotle (Poetics), and Empedocles; Studies on Maximus Planudes; Studies on Mycenaean
- Relatives: Giovanni Gallavotti (son)

Academic background
- Education: University of Bologna; University of Turin; University of Florence
- Alma mater: University of Bologna
- Doctoral advisor: Augusto Rostagni
- Other advisors: Enrico Rostagno; Giorgio Pasquali; Girolamo Vitelli; Medea Norsa

Academic work
- Discipline: Classics
- Sub-discipline: Ancient Greek literature; Latin literature; Mycenaean
- Institutions: University of Bari; University of Catania; Sapienza University of Rome
- Notable students: Anna Morpurgo Davies; Anna Sacconi

Carlo Gallavotti (23 January 1909 – 9 February 1992) was an Italian classical scholar and philologist, who taught at the Sapienza University of Rome.

== Biography ==
Gallavotti was born in Cesena from Giuseppe and Immacolata, née Lopiano. He graduated from the University of Bologna (advisor: Augusto Rostagni). He became Rostagni's research assistant at the University of Turin, then studied textual criticism, paleography and papyrology at the University of Florence, with Giorgio Pasquali, Enrico Rostagno, and Girolamo Vitelli and Medea Norsa. In 1932–1933 he taught Classical philology in Florence on behalf of Pasquali, who was put on leave for teaching abroad; in the next year he won a scholarship at the Sapienza and began working on the critical edition of Theocritus. In 1934 he was habilitated to high school teaching and taught in Pinerolo, Perugia and Bologna.

In 1939 he won a post at the Officina dei Papiri Ercolanesi and was assigned to teach Ancient Greek literature and Byzantine studies at the University of Naples. In 1945 he moved to teach Greek and Latin grammar, Ancient Greek literature, Latin literature and Papyrology at the University of Bari.

In 1946, Gallavotti was habilitated to university teaching and became Professor in Ancient Greek literature at the University of Catania. In 1947 he moved back to Bari and served as Dean of the Faculties of Humanities, of Magistero and of Foreign Languages. In 1949 he became Professor in Greek and Latin grammar at the Sapienza University of Rome and in 1958 he moved to the chair of Classical philology. From 1962 to 1979 he also taught Ancient Greek literature.

Gallavotti retired in 1979 and died in Rome in 1992. He was the father of Giovanni Gallavotti.

== Research activity ==
Gallavotti tied his name most notably to his critical edition of Theocritus and the Greek bucolic poets, which was published in 1946 and re-edited two times in his life. Gallavotti was the first to collate all the almost-180 known manuscripts and his edition was praised by A. S. F. Gow – but not by Pasquali, who approved Gallavotti's study of the transmission, but not his constitutio textus. Focusing on critically editing the texts, Gallavotti published relatively few papers on Theocritus, nonetheless he produced interpretative essays and studied the textual history of his works through the Byzantine times. Regarding the transmission of Classics and Byzantine philology, he is most noted for his ten "Planudea" essays, focused on manuscripts and the philological activity of Maximus Planudes. He also worked on papyri – chiefly literary and Herculaneum papyri – and published critical editions of Sappho and Alcaeus and of Menander's play Dyskolos.

Influenced by Augusto Rostagni, Gallavotti was interested in the ancient aesthetic theories and philosophy and edited Aristotle's Poetics and Empedocles' poem.

He is also credited with pioneering Mycenaean studies in Italy. Anna Morpurgo Davies and Anna Sacconi were his students; with the latter, Gallavotti published the Mycenaean inscriptions of Pyla.

Gallavotti's bibliography was simultaneously and independently collected by the scientific board of Rivista di Cultura Classica e Medievale, that also dedicated the 1994 issue to his memory, and by Silvio M. Medaglia and Camillo Neri (University of Bologna).

== Works by Gallavotti (selection) ==
=== Books ===
- Gallavotti, C., ed. (1946). Theocritus quique feruntur Bucolici Graeci. Rome: Typis Officinae Polygraphicae.
  - Gallavotti, C., ed. (1955). Theocritus quique feruntur Bucolici Graeci (2nd ed.). Rome: Typis Officinae Polygraphicae.
  - Gallavotti, C., ed. (1993). Theocritus quique feruntur Bucolici Graeci (3rd ed.). Rome: Typis Officinae Polygraphicae.
- Sappho; Alcaeus (1947–1948). Gallavotti, C. (ed.). Testimonianze e frammenti. Vol. I–II. Naples: Libreria Scientifica Editrice.
- Gallavotti, C. (1956). Lingua, tecnica e poesia negli idilli di Teocrito: Anno accademico 1951–1952. Dal corso di lezioni del prof. Carlo Gallavotti. Rome: Edizioni dell'Ateneo. OCLC 25799132.
- Gallavotti, C. (1956). Documenti e struttura del greco nell'età micenea: Anno accademico 1955–1956. Seminario di grammatica greca e latina. Rome: Edizioni dell'Ateneo. OCLC 17416253.
- Gallavotti, C.; Sacconi, A., eds. (1961). Inscriptiones Pyliae ad Mycenaeam aetatem pertinentes. Incunabola Graeca, 1. Rome: in aedibus Athenaei.
- Gallavotti, C. (1962). Rossi, L. E. (ed.). Fonti per la protostoria greca: Anno accademico 1961–1962. Rome: Edizioni dell'Ateneo. OCLC 17416253.
- Gallavotti, C. (1962). La lirica eolica: Anno accademico 1961–1962. Rome: Edizioni dell'Ateneo. OCLC 17416253.
- Menander (1966). Gallavotti, C. (ed.). Dyscolos. Rome: Edizioni dell'Ateneo.
- Aristotle (1974). Gallavotti, C. (ed.). Dell'arte poetica. Milan – Rome: Mondadori – Fondazione Lorenzo Valla.
- Empedocle (1975). Gallavotti, C. (ed.). Poema fisico e lustrale. Milan – Rome: Mondadori – Fondazione Lorenzo Valla.

=== Articles ===
- Gallavotti, C. (1934a). "I codici planudei di Teocrito". SIFC. 11: 289–313.
- Gallavotti, C. (1934b). "L'edizione teocritea di Moscopulo". RFIC. 62: 349–369.
- Gallavotti, C. (1935). "Novi Laurentiani codicis analecta". SBN. 4: 203–236.
- Gallavotti, C. (1936a). "Da Planude e Moscopulo alla prima edizione a stampa di Teocrito". SIFC². 13: 45–59.
- Gallavotti, C. (1936b). "Intorno al quinto idillio di Teocrito". RFIC². 14: 27–39.
- Gallavotti, C. (1939a). "Tre papiri fiorentini". RFIC². 17: 252–260.
- Gallavotti, C. (1939b). "Un nuovo codice atonita nel quadro della tradizione manoscritta di Teocrito". RFIC². 17: 43–55.
- Gallavotti, C. (1940). "Revisioni sul testo degli Epigrammi di Teocrito". RFIC². 18: 241–255.
- Gallavotti, C. (1941a). "Il papiro bucolico Viennese e la poesia di Bione". RFIC². 19: 233–258.
- Gallavotti, C. (1941b). "La libreria di una villa romana ercolanese (nella Casa dei papiri)". Bollettino del R. Istituto di Patologia del Libro. 3: 129–145.
- Gallavotti, C. (1941c). "Per il testo dei Geroglifici di Horo Apollo". SIFC². 18: 55–73.
- Gallavotti, C. (1941d). "[Studi sulla lirica greca: 1.—] La nuova ode di Saffo". RFIC². 19: 161–168.
- Gallavotti, C. (1941e). "[Studi sulla lirica greca: 4.—] L'ode saffica dell'ostrakon fiorentino". SIFC². 18: 175–202.
- Gallavotti, C.; Pugliese Carratelli, G. (1941). "Rilievi storici sulla nuova ode di Saffo". SIFC². 18: 161–174.
- Gallavotti, C. (1942a). "Nuovi testi letterari da Ossirinco". Aegyptus. 22 (1–2): 107–116. JSTOR 41214394.
- Gallavotti, C. (1942b). "Sopra un frammento di Ferecrate e un verso di Sofocle". Dioniso. 9: 24–31.
- Gallavotti, C. (1942c). "Studi sulla lirica greca: 2.— Le citazioni saffiche di Apollonio Rodio. 3.— Esegesi e testo dell'Ode fr. 2 di Saffo". RFIC². 20: 103–124.
- Gallavotti, C. (1942d). "Studi sulla lirica greca: 5.— Nuovi carmi di Alceo da Ossirinco". RFIC². 20: 161–181.
- Gallavotti, C. (1944–1945). "Studi sulla lirica greca: 6.— Il carme 4 di Bacchilide. 7.— Il libro degli Epinici di Bacchilide". RFIC². 22–23: 1–15.
- Gallavotti, C. (1945). "Per l'edizione di Teocrito". BPEC². 1: 21–39.
- Gallavotti, C. (1949a). "Archiloco". PP. 4: 130–153.
- Gallavotti, C. (1949b). "Il secondo carme di Orazio". PP. 4: 217–229.
- Gallavotti, C. (1949c). "Il tiranno di Archiloco". PP. 4: 69–71.
- Gallavotti, C. (1949d). "Laurentiani codicis altera analecta". RAL². 4: 352–379.
- Gallavotti, C. (1950). "Studi sulla lirica greca: 8.— Revisione metrica di frammenti eolici. 9.— La responsione esterna nella metrica eolica. 10.— Figura e metrica delle strofe eoliche". RFIC². 28: 97–116.
- Gallavotti, C. (1952a). "Per il testo di Teocrito". RFIC². 30: 137–148.
- Gallavotti, C. (1952b). "Planudea". BPEC². 7: 25–50.
- Gallavotti, C. (1953). "Auctarium Oxyrhynchium". Aegyptus. 33 (1): 107–116. JSTOR 41215454.
- Gallavotti, C. (1954a). "Il syndesmos in Aristotele". PP. 37: 241–255.
- Gallavotti, C. (1954b). "Per il testo della Poetica Aristotele". PP. 38: 321–333.
- Gallavotti, C. (1955a). "Anacreonte e la chioma recisa". PP. 40: 41–47.
- Gallavotti, C. (1955a). "Un restauro d'Anacreonte". PP. 40: 47–50.
- Gallavotti, C. (1956a). "Il segno della luna nel sillabario miceneo". RFIC. N. S. 34: 398–411.
- Gallavotti, C. (1956b). "La triade lesbia in un testo miceneo". RFIC. N. S. 34: 225–236.
- Gallavotti, C. (1956c). "Lettura di testi micenei". PP. 46: 5–24.
- Gallavotti, C. (1956d). "Note al testo della Poetica". SIFC. N. S. 27–28: 125–134.
- Gallavotti, C. (1956e). "Postilla alla nuova epigrafe alessandrina". Ἀντίδωρον Hugoni Henrico Paoli oblatum. Miscellanea Philologica. Genoa: Istituto di Filologia Classica. pp. 323–324.
- Gallavotti, C. (1960). "Planudea (II)". BPEC. N. S. 8: 11–23.
- Gallavotti, C. (1961). "40. Ode di Saffo". In Castiglioni, L. (ed.). Papiri della Università di Milano. P.Mil.Vogl. Vol. II. Milan: A. Giuffré. pp. 17–21.
- Gallavotti, C. (1981). "Planudea (III)". BollClass. 2: 3–27.
- Gallavotti, C. (1982a). "La silloge tricliniana di Teocrito e un codice parigino-laurenziano". BollClass. 3: 3–22.
- Gallavotti, C. (1982b). "Planudea (IV)". BollClass. 3: 63–86.
- Gallavotti, C. (1983b). "Planudea (V)". BollClass. 4: 36–56.
- Gallavotti, C. (1983a). "Nota sulla schedografia di Moscopulo e i suoi precedenti fino a Teodoro Prodromo". BollClass. 4: 3–35.
- Gallavotti, C. (1983c). "Planudea (VI)". BollClass. 4: 101–128.
- Gallavotti, C. (1984). "Nuovi papiri di Teocrito". BollClass. 5: 3–42.
- Gallavotti, C. (1987). "Planudea (VII)". BollClass. 8: 96–128.
- Gallavotti, C. (1989a). "Planudea (VIII)". BollClass. 10: 1–16.
- Gallavotti, C. (1989b). "Planudea (IX)". BollClass. 10: 49–69.
- Gallavotti, C. (1990). "Planudea (X)". BollClass. 11: 78–103.

== Fellowship of learned societies ==
- Corresponding member, Φιλολογικός Σύλλογος Παρνασσός [Parnassos Literary Society] (Athens).
- Corresponding member, Deutsches Archäologisches Institut (Berlin).
- Fellowship, Accademia dei Lincei (1957).
- Fellowship, Accademia dell'Arcadia (Rome).
- Fellowship, Accademia delle Scienze di Palermo.
- Fellowship, Accademia delle Scienze di Torino (1953).
- Fellowship, Accademia Pugliese delle Scienze (Bari).
- Fellowship, Istituto di Studi Romani (Rome).
- Honorary fellowship, Accademia degli Incamminati (Bologna).
- Honorary fellowship, Ελληνική Ανθρωπιστική Εταιρεία [Hellenic Humanistic Society].

== Bibliography ==
- AA. VV. (1994). "Bibliografia di Carlo Gallavotti". RCCM. 36 (1–2): V–XXX. JSTOR 23946931.
- Angeli, A. (2013). "Carlo Gallavotti (1908–1992)". In Capasso, M. (ed.). Hermae. Scholars and Scholarship in Papyrology. Biblioteca degli «Studi di Egittologia e di Papirologia», 10. Vol. III. Pisa – Rome: Fabrizio Serra Editore. pp. 87–129. ISBN 978-88-6227-620-7.
- Ghiselli, A. (1995). "Ricordo di Carlo Gallavotti". Eikasmos. 6: 311–314.
- Gow, A. S. F., ed. (1952). Theocritus. Vol. I. Cambridge: University Press. ISBN 9780521066167.
- Medaglia, S. M.; Neri, C. (1995). "Bibliografia di Carlo Gallavotti". Eikasmos. 6: 315–336.
- Nicolai, R. (1998). "Gallavotti, Carlo". Dizionario Biografico degli Italiani. Rome: Istituto dell'Enciclopedia Italiana. pp. 526–528.
- Pasquali, G. (1951). "Review of Gow 1952". Athenaeum. 39: 372–382.
- Rossi, L. E. (1994). "Ricordo di Carlo Gallavotti". RCCM. 36 (1–2): 1–4. JSTOR 23946932.
- Traversa, A. (1956). "L'iscrizione metrica per Felice. Una nuova epigrafe del Museo Greco-Romano di Alessandria d'Egitto". Ἀντίδωρον Hugoni Henrico Paoli oblatum. Miscellanea Philologica. Genoa: Istituto di Filologia Classica. pp. 283–322.
