= 1990 in archaeology =

- 1980s ^{.} 1990s in archaeology ^{.} 2000
- Other events: 1990s ^{.} Archaeology timeline

== Excavations ==
- Start of 5-year project of large excavations at Birka (Sweden).
- Start of 5-year project of excavation and restoration at the Ruins of Saint Paul's, Macau.
- Start of long-term project of large excavations at Sagalassos (Turkey) by Marc Waelkens.
- Work begins at Leptiminus (Tunisia) by David Mattingly.
- Survey and excavation at Tall el-Hammam.
- Vijayanagara research project begins in India.
- The first of three World War II German tanks is recovered from the Czarna Nida river in southern Poland.

== Finds ==
- March – Swash Channel Wreck, a continental European armed merchantman of the early 17th century, is found off the south coast of England.
- July - Discovered the rests of a man of the Ortoiroid culture in Vieques island, Puerto Rico, dated back about 2000 b.c.
- October – Wonoboyo Hoard of gold and silver artifacts from the 9th century Mataram kingdom in Central Java.
- December 13 – West Runton Mammoth partially uncovered in England.
- Vũng Tàu shipwreck, a lorcha (boat) of about 1690 carrying a cargo of porcelain, is identified in the South China Sea (in the Côn Đảo archipelago).
- Workers' tombs in Giza pyramid complex of Egypt.
- "Ossuary of Caiaphas" in Jerusalem.
- A road-building crew in Central China accidentally uncovers a Han dynasty vault, containing perhaps tens of thousands of terra-cotta figures.

== Publications ==
- Sylvia P. Beamon and Susan Roaf – The Ice-houses of Britain.

== Events ==
- November – British Government produces Planning Policy Guidance 16: Archaeology and Planning to advise local authorities on the treatment of archaeology within the planning process. Site developers are required to contract with archaeological teams to have sites investigated in advance of development.

== Deaths ==
- January 29 – Leslie Peter Wenham, English Roman archaeologist (born 1911)

== See also ==
- Pompeii
