= Gallavotti =

Gallavotti is an Italian surname. Notable people with the surname include:

- Barbara Gallavotti (born 1967), Italian biologist and science communicator
- Carlo Gallavotti (1909–1992), Italian classical scholar and philologist
- Giovanni Gallavotti (born 1941), Italian mathematical physicist

== See also ==
- Galavotti
