= 1918 in archaeology =

Below are notable events in archaeology that occurred in 1918.

== Excavations ==
- Ballshi inscription, a 9th-century epigraph testifying to the christianization of Bulgaria

== Births ==
- 11 February – Anne Stine Ingstad, Norwegian archaeologist, co-discoverer of Viking artifacts at L'Anse aux Meadows (d. 1997)
- 8 March – Mendel L. Peterson, American underwater archaeologist (d. 2003)
- 20 May – Carlos J. Gradin, Argentine archaeologist (d. 2002)
- 24 June – Elizabeth Eames, English archaeologist (d. 2008)
- 20 August – Crystal Bennett, Alderney-born archaeologist of Jordan (d. 1987)
- 25 October – Donald Wiseman, Professor of Assyriology at the University of London (d. 2010)
- 18 December – Joyce Reynolds, English epigrapher (d. 2022)

== Deaths ==
- 27 January – Canon William Greenwell, English archaeologist notable for his Grimes Graves excavations (b. 1820)
