= Berlin Sculpture-Network =

- Type: Cooperative project
- Purpose: To reconstruct the spatial, functional and substantive contexts context of ancient sculptures
- Location: Berlin

The Berlin Sculpture-Network was a cooperative project between the Antiquities Collection of the Berlin State Museums and the Institute of Classical Archaeology at the Free University of Berlin. Funded by the German Federal Ministry of Education and Research within the initiative “Translating Humanities” (“Übersetzungsfunktion von Geisteswissenschaften"), the project ran from 2009 to 2012. Its aim was to reconstruct the spatial, functional and substantive contexts of ancient sculptures.

The "Berlin Sculpture-Network" project includes a database of ancient sculptures in the museums, along with associated archival records and current excavation data. It also includes a collection of all plaster casts in the Berlin collections. The data is available in the online database Arachne.

== Objects ==
Selected research results were showcased in a major exhibition at the Pergamon Museum in 2011, where an interactive 3D visualization of the archaeological monuments of the ancient city of Pergamon was introduced to the general public. This virtual 3D model served as a research tool, combining the latest findings from the excavations in Pergamon with reconstructions of the city and its surrounding landscape, as well as marble sculptures presented in their original contexts. The exhibition laid the foundation for the long-term development of new exhibition concepts for the Berlin Antiquities collection at the Berlin State Museums.

The "Berlin Sculpture-Network" is a platform for scientific exchange between project members and numerous specialists both within and outside Berlin, who research Greek and Roman sculpture and supply scientific contributions to the project.

== See also ==
- German Archaeological Institute, Berlin central office
- Arachne (archaeological database)
