= 2002 in archaeology =

== Explorations ==
- First expedition to Sub Marine Explorer in the Pearl Islands by James P. Delgado.

== Excavations ==
- March – Part of the podium of the Temple of Apollo in Mdina, Malta is discovered and subsequently excavated.

== Finds ==
- February – Remains of oldest known European early modern humans at this time found in Peștera cu Oase, Romania.
- May 1 – Horncastle boar's head, an early 7th-century Anglo-Saxon ornament, probably part of a helmet crest, discovered in the eastern English town of Horncastle by a metal detectorist.
- May 3 – Amesbury Archer, a Bronze Age burial found near Stonehenge in England.
- June – Newport Ship (medieval) in south-east Wales.
- October – Banc Ty'nddôl sun-disc in mid-Wales.
- 3,500-year-old human remains found in the Citadel of Damascus.
- Mask of la Roche-Cotard (Mousterian) found beside the Loire in France.

== Publications ==
- Thebes tablets.

== Events ==
- Brief reappearance and study of Seaton Carew Wreck.
- Ciampate del Diavolo (early hominid footprints in Italy) come to scientific attention.
- December 29 – 70,000 excavated artifacts from the Ōfune Site in Japan are damaged or destroyed when fire breaks out in an exhibition room.

== Deaths ==
- March 31 – Carlos J. Gradin, Argentine archaeologist (born 1918)
- April 28 – Gordon Willey, American archaeologist (born 1913)
- June 26 – Barbara Adams, English Egyptologist (born 1945)

== See also ==
- Syria - ongoing excavations.
