= Maritime Archaeology Sea Trust =

Charitable trust in the UK

- Formation: 2011
- Legal status: Charitable Trust
- Purpose: Maritime Archaeological research, fieldwork, conservation, education & training
- Headquarters: United Kingdom
- Location: United Kingdom
- Region served: Worldwide
- Official language: English
- Patron: Baron Iliffe, Simon Jenkins, Maldwin Drummond
- Website: Thisismast.org
- Remarks: Registered charity number 1140497

Maritime Archaeology Sea Trust (MAST) is a charitable trust founded in February 2011, which focuses on investigations into the maritime heritage of the United Kingdom and further afield, through historical and archaeological investigations. MAST uses its profits from contract work as well as donations to fund its charitable aims.

Its stated objective is to advance the education of the public in maritime heritage, focusing in particular on maritime archaeological material. By such means as the directors in their discretion shall from time to time think fit including the preservation and investigation of shipwrecked vessels and of historically or otherwise valuable maritime material and the dissemination of the educationally useful results of such investigation to the general public. It does this by conducting archaeological surveys and excavations, conservation of material and publication of results. Clients include Historic England, the Ministry of Defence and the National Trust.

MAST is also accredited to the Governing Bodies of the 2001 UNESCO Convention on the Protection of the Underwater Cultural Heritage and is a signatory to the Armed Forces Covenant which is committed to honour and to support the Armed Forces community of the United Kingdom

== Projects ==
MAST takes a holistic approach to maritime archaeology covering a wide range of methods and environments including geophysics (both on land and sea), excavations, surveys, conservation and desk-based research.

=== HMS Invincible 1744 ===
In July 2016 MAST received a £2 million grant for the rescue excavation, recovery, conservation and public display of material from the wreck of HMS Invincible (1747) with partners Bournemouth University, National Museum of the Royal Navy, Dan Pascoe of Pascoe Archaeological Services and Serving and ex-Service volunteers and the Community.

Chancellor George Osborne said: "The wreck of the HMS Invincible is an invaluable part of the UK's proud maritime history and it is important we work to save as much as possible. This hugely worthwhile project will support military veterans, serving personnel and disadvantaged teenagers to learn new skills and put artefacts from the wreck on public display for the first time".

The site was first found in 1979 by Arthur Mack. John Bingeman subsequently led excavations between 1980 and 1990 (Bingeman 2010). Dan Pascoe of Pascoe Archaeological Services took the reins in 2010, monitoring the increasingly vulnerable site, undertaking extensive survey work and raising artefacts at risk from destruction, work funded by Historic England. It was this that led Historic England to recognise the site's vulnerability.

Chatham Historic Dockyard holds a collection of artefacts from HMS Invincible. Eighteenth-century maritime archaeological material is relatively scarce in UK collections, despite the number of wrecks from that period located in surrounding waters. The HMS Invincible 1744 Project aims to contribute additional data on shipbuilding and shipboard life of the era.

=== Esmeralda 1503 ===
Following the discovery of a site consistent with an early 16th-century European wreck off Al-Hallaniyah in 1998, the Omani government, spearheaded by its Ministry of Heritage and Culture, agreed to initially to a reconnaissance expedition in 2013. David Mearns, director of Blue Water Recoveries, brought together a team of maritime archaeologists from MAST and Bournemouth University, geophysicists and other scientists in 2013 to conduct a reconnaissance survey of the site, 14 years after its initial discovery. The archaeology team, led by Associate Professor Dave Parham of Bournemouth University, was supported by MAST which co-funded the first expedition in 2013. There have two subsequent fieldwork seasons and fieldwork was completed in November 2015.

=== Royal Navy Loss List ===
As part of a team undertaking the 2001 UNESCO Convention Impact Review for the United Kingdom, MAST completed the Royal Navy Loss List, a major assessment of the international spread of UK sovereign wrecks.

The RN Loss List, from 1512 to 1947, is compiled from the volumes and websites listed below from the earliest known RN wreck. The assessment shows that there are over 4,700 Royal Naval wrecks scattered across the oceans of the world, covering the period between 1512 and 1945.

=== Coronation Geophysical Survey ===
A Geophysical Survey was conducted by MAST and the Cornwall and Isles of Scilly Maritime Archaeological Society (CISMAS) on the Coronation Protected Wreck Site. Promare UK was sub-contracted to conduct the magnetometer survey and Swathe Services to conduct a multibeam survey producing a site plan of geo-referenced targets of both designated sites and the intermediate area.

The Coronation was a 90-gun second rate, built in 1685 by Isaac Betts at Portsmouth dockyard as one of the 1677 thirty-ships programme. On 3 September 1691 after patrolling for the French fleet, the English Fleet made for Plymouth. The Coronation foundered in a strong south easterly gale whilst trying to round Penlee Point with a loss of all but 13 of her crew, including the captain, Charles Skelton.

The Coronation Protected wreck site consists of two designated areas: Inshore (designated 1988) & Offshore (designated 1978). The area in between these two protected sites is known as the "Intermediate" site wherein lies an unverified scatter of archaeological material.

=== Bamburgh Castle Beach Wreck ===
A rarely seen portion of an unknown wreck within the intertidal zone of Bamburgh Castle Beach was reported to MAST by Steve Brown, a PADI Basic Archaeological Diver (BAD) Instructor and local historian. MAST has conducted two preliminary surveys of the site in 2013 to establish the extent of the site and how much remains under the sand.

The survival and position of some of the features within the wreck would suggest that the buried structure could be mostly intact as the position of hull structure, deck beams, masts and even deck fittings are all as would be expected from a mostly intact buried vessel.

Dendrochronological samples were taken as part of this survey to try and establish the date and origin of the vessel.

The site is now protected under the Ancient Monuments and Archaeological Areas Act 1979.

=== Swash Channel Wreck Artefacts ===
MAST has donated funds to conserve three of the carvings from the Swash Channel Wreck as well as a canister

They were raised in August 2010. The two carvings were found directly above the gunports in the bowcastle and are in extremely good condition. They bring the number of carvings found on the site to five.

The work will be done by the York Archaeological Trust. Once conserved you will be able to see the artefacts up close at Poole Museum.

=== MoD wrecks ===
MAST, in partnership with Bournemouth University, won a Ministry of Defence (MoD) contract to assess the environmental and safety risks posed by the tankers RFA Creosol (1916), RFA War Mehtar (1919) and the escort carrier HMS Dasher (D37). This assessment includes research into the history of the wreck and its cargo/contents.

The ships fall into two broad groups, purpose-built tankers and an escort aircraft carrier converted from a merchant ship. The first two are relatively simple vessels and the third a much more complex vessel that is likely to be complicated by its conversion and change of use and reuse.

== Not for Profit ==
MAST has conducted two major charity events off Plymouth Sound. One in 2012 and one in 2013. In September 2012 MAST raised £6,000 to raise awareness for maritime heritage in the UK and for the RNLI's Plymouth branch.

In August 2013, MAST raised money again to raise awareness for the need to protect UK maritime heritage but also for the charity Battle Back which received £2,000 towards helping injured Service personnel in their rehabilitation.

== Diving Speciality ==
In 2012 MAST created a PADI Distinctive Specialty called Basic Archaeological Diver, a no frills, no fuss introduction to the basics of archaeology underwater with simple recording techniques using little more than a camera and tape measures. The course is now also a Scuba Schools International accredited course and is recognised by British Sub Aqua Club (BSAC). The course is an introduction to the basics includes a lecture on the laws governing divers and underwater archaeology in the UK.
