= Peterson Island =

Antarctic island

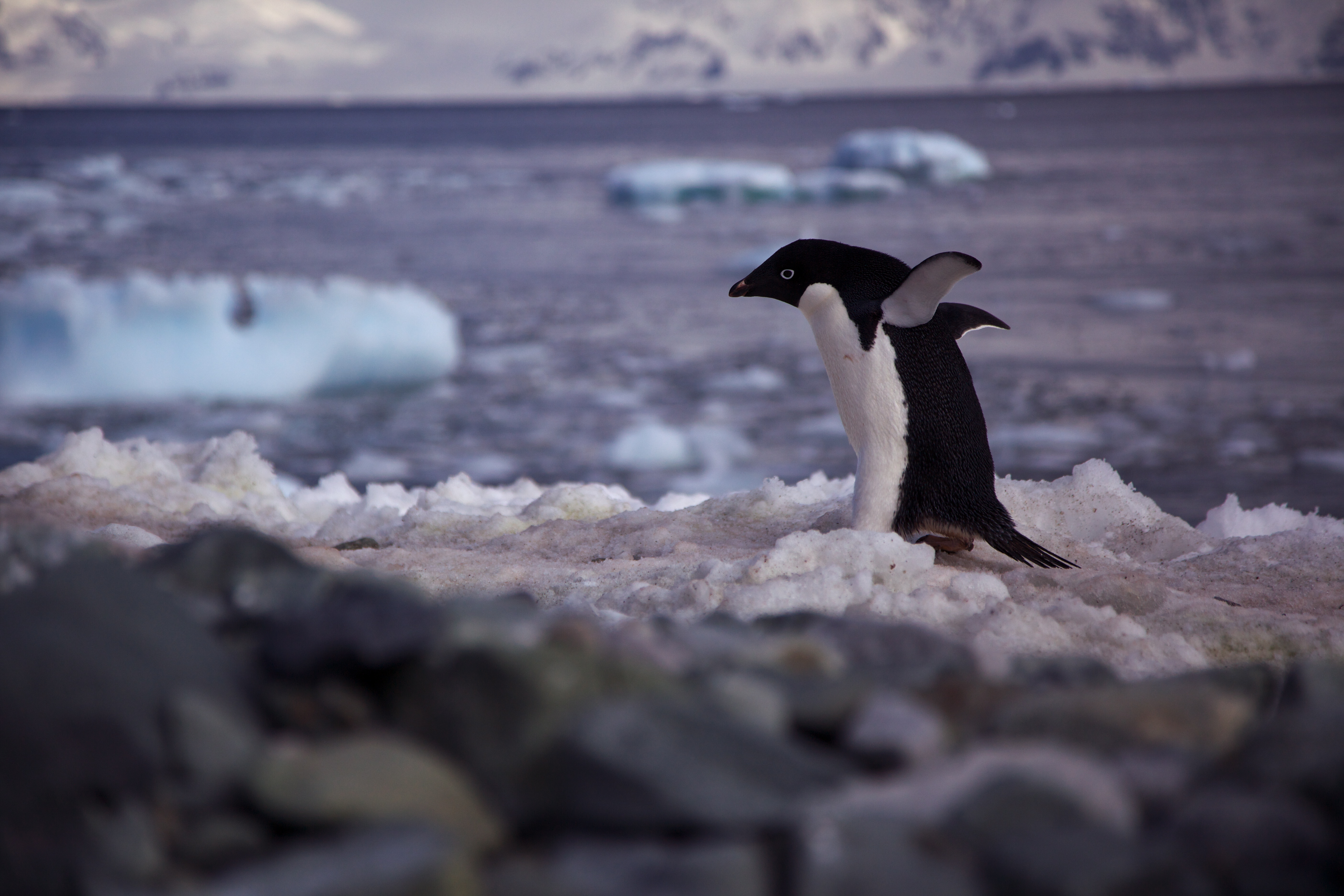
- Adélie penguins breed in the IBA

- Location within Antarctica

Geography
- Location: Antarctica
- Coordinates: 66°28′S 110°30′E
- Archipelago: Windmill Islands
- Length: 3.5 km (2.17 mi)
- Width: 2 km (1.2 mi)
- Highest elevation: 60 m (200 ft)

Administration
- Administered under the Antarctic Treaty System

Demographics
- Population: Uninhabited

Peterson Island is a rocky island, 3.5 km (2.2 mi) long, with two inlets indenting the north side, lying west of, and separated by a narrow channel 200-400 m wide from, the Browning Peninsula, in the southern part of the Windmill Islands on the Budd Coast of Wilkes Land, Antarctica.

== Discovery and naming ==
The island was first mapped from aerial photos taken by the USN's Operation Highjump and Operation Windmill in 1947 and 1948. It was named by the US-ACAN for Lt. Mendel L. Peterson, USN, supply officer with Operation Windmill which established astronomical control stations in the area in January 1948.

=== Benlein Point ===
Benlein Point is the southernmost point of the island. It was named by the US-ACAN for Construction Man Franklin J. Benlein, USN, a member of the Wilkes Station party of 1958.

=== Mackemer Point ===
Mackemer Point is the north-westernmost point of the island. It was named by the US-ACAN for Aerographer's Mate Frederick W. Mackemer, USN, another member of the Wilkes Station party of 1958.

=== Knowles Passage ===
Knowles Passage separates Holl Island from Peterson Island. It was named by US-ACAN for Lt Lloyd C. Knowles, USN, engineer officer of the USS Burton Island, who took part in survey and photographic operations in January 1948.

== Important Bird Area ==
A 397 ha site, comprising the whole island and its central inlet, has been designated an Important Bird Area (IBA) by BirdLife International because it supports a colony of some 30,000 Adélie penguins, based on 2011 satellite imagery. Other birds breeding on the island include a large colony of snow petrels, as well as Cape petrels, southern fulmars, south polar skuas and Wilson's storm petrels. Southern elephant seals haul out and breed on the island's northern and north-western slopes, the most southerly known breeding site for the species.

== See also ==
- Composite Antarctic Gazetteer
- List of Antarctic and Subantarctic islands
- List of Antarctic islands south of 60° S
- SCAR
- Territorial claims in Antarctica
