= 2004 in archaeology =

The year 2004 in archaeology included many events, some of which are listed below.

== Excavations ==
- Summer - Tambora culture in Indonesia.
- September 29 - Fort Tanjong Katong in Singapore (excavations continue for 10 months).
- Work by Jeffrey P. Brain on the Popham Colony ends (began in 1994)

== Explorations ==
- Start of the three-year Bombay Before the British project.
- Start of the Iziko South African Museum project to attempt to identify the wreck of the slave ship Meermin.
- Preliminary excavations at Must Farm Bronze Age settlement in The Fens of eastern England.

== Publications ==
- Bond, James (2004). Monastic Landscapes. Stroud: Tempus. ISBN 0-7524-1440-2.
- Dunbar, Robin (2004). The Human Story: a new history of mankind's evolution. London: Faber. ISBN 0-571-19133-9.
- Friedrich, M.; et al. (2004). "The 12,460-year Hohenheim oak and pine tree-ring chronology from central Europe: a unique annual record for radiocarbon calibration and paleoenvironment reconstructions". Radiocarbon. 46 (3): 1111–1122. Bibcode:2004Radcb..46.1111F. doi:10.1017/S003382220003304X. S2CID 53343999.

== Finds ==
- Huxley Hoard of 10th century Viking silver jewellery discovered near Huxley, Cheshire, England.
- Site of naval Battle of the Aegates (241 BCE) located off Levanzo.
- Salcombe B underwater archaeological site identified from Bronze Age finds discovered on the Salcombe Cannon Wreck site off the English south coast.
- Swash Channel Wreck (early 17th century) rediscovered off Poole Harbour on the English south coast.
- Artifacts retrieved from the Dutch East India Company ship Rooswijk (1740) on the Goodwin Sands.
- Shorwell helmet (Anglo-Saxon) found on the Isle of Wight.
- Fossilized dinosaur brain found at Bexhill-on-Sea on the English south coast.

== Events ==
- November 15 - Human Tissue Act 2004 in Britain requires licences for the public display of human remains and provides for transfer of such remains from museum collections.
- New calibration curve for dendrochronology, INTCAL04, internationally ratified for dates back to 26,000 BP.
- Albert Goodyear of the University of South Carolina Institute of Archaeology and Anthropology announces that radiocarbon dating at the Topper archaeological site in South Carolina dates it to approximately 50,000 years ago, or approximately 37,000 years before the Clovis culture.
- Brief reappearance and further study of Seaton Carew Wreck on the English north-east coast.
- Graeme Barker elected to the Disney Professorship of Archaeology at the University of Cambridge in England.
