= Emagines =

Emagines is a project, funded since 2006 by the German Research Foundation (DFG), for digitizing the large and partially very old collections of images held by the German Archaeological Institute (DAI). The German Archaeological Institute (DAI) and the Research Archive for Ancient Sculpture (FA) are cooperating in the long-term strategic operation of a database Arachne which aims at making these digitized images accessible worldwide.

== Requirements and aims ==
The project began with the glass negatives from the departments of the German Archaeological Institute at Athens, Istanbul and Cairo (Emagines1) in 2006. Negatives from Rome, Madrid, the headquarters in Berlin and the Eurasia-Department of the DAI were added during the second project phase in 2008 (Emagines2). These negatives mostly contain historical images of sculpture, topography and architecture, much of which no longer exists in its former condition. Furthermore, the negatives are severely threatened by physical decomposition and destruction due to environmental influences, natural catastrophes like earthquakes and (in the long run) manual use.

The project aims at the permanent digital preservation of the negatives and their content. Until being made available in the Arachne database, widespread use of these negatives has been hindered by the way they have been scattered and by the partially overlapping nature of their images they carry. The digitized image holdings are copyrighted by the DAI and are therefore shown to the Arachne guest with the water mark of the DAI.

The internet presentation of the images also provides a platform for an e-commerce system, still in a test phase. Within the database framework, textual information about the objects depicted in the images will be continually updated by the DAI by citing new bibliographical references.

The database was modified not only with regard to its contents, but also technically in response to the heterogeneous material, which varies greatly in type, chronology and cultural history. a new entry mask has been developed to describe the essential characteristics of the material in many of those object groups, and some of the existing entry masks needed to be extended or customized.

== Workflow ==
To avoid exposing the fragile contents from the risks of long-distance transport, the images are being scanned in the departments of the German Archaeological Institute (DAI) in an ongoing process. The scanned images are then sent to the Research Archive for digital processing, entry into a database and long-term storage on the SAN of the University of Cologne for the DAI. The resulting documentation-complex is a centralised scientific of the DAI which can be accessed by web.

== Data ==
84,298 (week 51 in 2009) glass negatives are currently available in Arachne. About 44,000 of these belong to the Emagines2 project. A fuzzy meta-search for the character string 'Emagines' results in about 48,000 hits in different categories, including the glass negatives. The glass negatives can be referenced through 84,298 records using image-navigation.

== See also ==
- Arachne (Official Webpage)
- Arachne-project: Emagines
- Research Archive for Ancient Sculpture
- German Archeological Institut
- Humanities Computing in Cologne
