= 1937 in archaeology =

Below are notable events in archaeology that occurred in 1937.

== Excavations ==
- Uaxactun project by Carnegie Institution led by Oliver Ricketson ends.
- Excavations at Vergina conducted by University of Thessaloniki.
- Major excavations begin at Avebury by Alexander Keiller (continue until 1939).
- Excavations at Alalakh, Turkey, conducted by Leonard Woolley, begin (continue until 1949, interrupted by World War II).
- Excavations at Nagar, Syria, conducted by Max Mallowan, begin (continue until 1938).
- Chinese excavations at Peking Man Site in Zhoukoudian, begun in 1927 by Davidson Black, and Yinxu, begun in 1928 by Li Chi, come to an end with the outbreak of the Second Sino-Japanese War.
- Excavations begin at the Neolithic site of Hyrax Hill, Kenya, by Mary Leakey (continue until 1938).
- Major excavations begin at the Hohlenstein-Stadel cave in Germany, conducted by Robert Wetzel and Otto Völzing (continue until August 1939).
- Recording of standing medieval buildings by William A. Pantin and excavations beneath site and stratigraphy of medieval pottery by Rupert Bruce-Mitford on construction site for New Bodleian Library in Oxford, one of the earliest instances of rescue archaeology in England.
- Excavation of 'Caesar's Camp' Iron Age hillfort on Wimbledon Common in London.
- Expedition to the Nuuk district of Greenland by a Polish team led by Aage Roussell.

== Finds ==
- Ferriby Boat 1 found by Ted Wright. Wright finds two other boats, in 1940 and 1963, the latter of which is later discovered to be the oldest Bronze Age boat in Western Europe.
- Earliest known papyrus scroll found in tomb of Hemaka at Saqqara in Egypt.
- A large garlanded sarcophagus is found in the necropolis near Konuralp in Turkey.

== Publications ==
- Dorothy Garrod - The Stone Age of Mount Carmel: excavations at the Wady el-Mughara.
- Stuart Piggott - "The early Bronze Age in Wessex".

== Events ==
- Institute of Archaeology established within the University of London by Mortimer Wheeler and Tessa Verney Wheeler.
- Lion of Amphipolis re-erected in Greece.
- Obelisk of Axum moved from Ethiopia to Rome. It is returned to Ethiopia in 2005.
- A Civilian Conservation Corps of Navajo stonemasons repairs Chacoan buildings in Chaco Canyon. A previous group has built soil conservation devices, planted trees and improved roads and trails.

== Births ==
- June 18 - Bruce Trigger, Canadian archaeologist and McGill University professor (died 2006)
- July 25 - Colin Renfrew, British archaeologist (died 2024)
- November 3 - Andrea Carandini, Italian archaeology professor

== Deaths ==
- July 17 - Percy Gardner, English classical archaeologist (born 1846)
