= Thebes tablets =

Inscribed works discovered in Thebes, Greece

The Thebes tablets, with inscriptions in Mycenaean Greek using Linear B, were discovered in Thebes, Greece. They belong to the Late Helladic IIIB context, contemporary with finds at Pylos. A first group of 21 fragments was found in the 1963–64 campaign; A further 19 tablets were found in 1970 and 1972. Using Near Eastern cylinder seals associated with the finds, the editors of the published corpus of the whole archive now date the destruction of the Kadmeion, the Mycenaean palace complex at Thebes, and thus the writing of the tablets, some of which were still damp when they were unintentionally fired, to shortly after 1225 BC. Chadwick identified three recognizable Hellenic divinities, Hera, Hermes and Potnia "Mistress", among the recipients of wool. He made out a case for ko-ma-we-te-ja, also attested at Pylos, as the name of a goddess.

Quite early, before the more recent discoveries, Frederick Ahl made the provocative suggestion concerning the φοινικήια γράμματα "Phoenician" or "palm-leaf" (phoinix) letters: "Cadmus did bring writing to Thebes, but this writing was not the Phoenician alphabet, but Linear B".

== Discovery ==
A substantial additional portion, some 250 tablets, amounting roughly to 5% of the entire Mycenaean corpus from all sites, was discovered in Pelopidou Street and the "Arsenal" by Vassilis L. Aravantinos, the current archaeological superintendent of Thebes, from 1993 to 1995, in a rescue excavation. In 1996, a few more tablets were identified in a museum among finds from the 1963–1964 dig in Thebes.

The number of "tablets" given by the editors is actually misleading. For example, as Tom Palaima and Sarah James have independently demonstrated, the "123 tablets" of the Fq series actually are many fragments of texts that originally made up between 15 and 18 tablets.

== Publication ==
The Belgian and Italian professors and philologists Louis Godart and Anna Sacconi were charged with the publication of these tablets. During the following years, their preliminary glimpses of the contents suggested that the new tablets could reveal a new view of Mycenaean religion when the tablets were published in 2001, the effect of their overall content was perceived disappointing by some scholars

== Findings ==
Many of the Thebes tablets can be read as containing information on divinities and religious rites; others mention quantities of various commodities. By the sites mentioned, the boundaries of the region controlled by the Theban palace can be estimated: the Theban palace controlled the island of Euboea and had a harbour in Aulis. The tablets contain a number of important terms previously unattested in Linear B, such as ra-ke-da-mi-ni-jo /Lakedaimnijos/ "a man from Lacedaemonia (Sparta)", or ma-ka, which some want to interpret as /Mā Gā/ "Mother Gaia" (a goddess still revered in Thebes in the 5th century BC, as reported, for example, in Aeschylus' Seven Against Thebes); however, this is implausible, because ma-ka is a single word, and there are no examples in ca. 5,000 Mycenaean texts of two monosyllabic words being combined into a single lexical unit. Also ku-na-ki-si /gunaiksi/ "for women" exhibits the peculiar oblique stem of Ancient Greek: γυνή "woman".

Vassilis L. Aravantinos, Louis Godart and Anna Sacconi read the tablets to indicate cult activity dedicated to Demeter, Zeus protector of crops, and to Kore, and they speculate that the roots of the Eleusinian Mysteries can be traced back to Mycenaean Thebes. Thomas G. Palaima, however, has criticized their suggestions as "subject to very dubious interpretations" and "highly suspect on linguistic and exegetical grounds". Other arguments against the identification of cult activity in the texts have been advanced by Sarah James and Yves Duhoux.

Palaima attaches importance to one tablet (Uo 121) as evidence of linking sacrificial animals with foodstuffs at the end of LHIIIB. The same phenomenon, part of ritual Mycenaean feasting, occurs in the contemporary Pylos tablets.

== Vienna symposium ==
The Thebes tablets were discussed at a linguist symposium held in Vienna December 5–6, 2002, the results of which have been published. Günter Neumann (pp. 125–138) argues that the animals in the Thebes tablets are not sacred or "divine" but animals that would naturally be part of everyday life for both Mycenaean and later Greeks. He gathers historical evidence, including references to the animals being fed grains.

Michael Meier-Brügger (pp. 111–118) argues that de-qo-no as "master of banqueting" has no clear linguistic origin but could be deipnon "main dinner", as in Homer; that di-wi-ja-me-ro may not refer to "the part for the goddess Diwia" but instead a "two-day period" (as also argued earlier by Melena and in the same volume by Killen). Meier-Brügger also argues that si-to is not a previously unattested god Sito (Grain) but siton "grain".

José Luis Garcia Ramón (pp. 37–69) argues that, linguistically, a-ko-ro-da-mo may not be agorodamos "mystic assembler of the people". He proposes the Greek male name Akrodamos. He believes that o-po-re-i, according to Mycenaean usage of gods' names and epithets, could not mean "Zeus of the Fall Harvest". Instead, he posits that o-po-re-i is a personal name, parallel to another in the Thebes tablets, me-to-re-i; the names mean respectively "on the mountain" and "beyond the mountain".

John T. Killen (pp. 79–110) specifically concludes (p. 103) that "the fact that ma-ka, o-po-re-i, and ko-wa never all occur together, and that it requires a special hypothesis to explain this fact, combined with what I believe are the continuing difficulties with explaining o-po-re-i as a theonym /Opo:rehi/, make me reluctant for the present to accept the ma-ka = Ma:i Ga:i [i.e., Mother Earth] equation".

== Sources ==
- V. L. Aravantinos, L. Godart, A. Sacconi, Thèbes: Fouilles de la Cadmée I: Les tablettes en Linéaire B de la Odos Pelopidou: Édition et commentaire. Pisa and Rome: Istituti editoriali e poligrafici internazionali, 2001. ISBN 88-8147-228-7
- V. L. Aravantinos, L. Godart, A. Sacconi, A. Sacconi, Thèbes: Fouilles de la Cadmée III: Corpus des documents d'archives en linéaire B de Thèbes (1-433). Pisa and Rome: Istituti editoriali e poligrafici internazionali, 2002. ISBN 88-8147-354-2 ISBN 88-8147-301-1
- V. L. Aravantinos, M. del Freo, L. Godart, Thèbes: Fouilles de la Cadmée IV: Les textes de Thèbes (1-433): Translitération et tableaux des scribes. Pisa and Rome: Istituti editoriali e poligrafici internazionali, 2005. ISBN 88-8147-421-2 ISBN 88-8147-434-4
- "Bryn Mawr Classics Review 20: review of all three volumes". Bryn Mawr Classics Review. 2005.
- Duhoux, Yves, "Dieux ou humains? Qui sont "ma-ka", "o-po-re-i" et "ko-wa" dans les tablettes linéaire B de Thèbes," Minos p. 37-38 (2002-2003 [2006]), pp. 173-254.
- S.A. James, "The Thebes Tablets and the Fq series: A Contextual Analysis," Minos 37-38 (2002-2003 [2006]), pp. 397–418.
- S. Deger-Jalkotzy and O. Panagl, Die Neuen Linear B-Texte aus Theben (Vienna: Verlag der Österreichischen Akademie der Wissenschaften 2006). ISBN 978-3-7001-3640-8
