= Mendel L. Peterson =

American pioneer in the field of underwater archeology

- Born: March 8, 1918; Moore, Idaho, US
- Died: July 30, 2003 (aged 85); McLean, Virginia, US
- Known for: Underwater archeology

Mendel L. Peterson (March 8, 1918 – July 30, 2003) was an American pioneer in the field of underwater archeology and former curator at the Smithsonian Institution, becoming known as "the father of underwater archeology". His specialties included underwater exploration and numismatics. Peterson Island in Antarctica is named after him.

== Career ==
Peterson retired in 1973 after 25 years at the Smithsonian, where he had held the positions of Associate Curator and Curator of the Divisions of Military and Naval History, 1948–1957; Head Curator of the Department of History, 1951–1957; Head Curator and Chairman of the Department of Armed Forces History, 1957–1969; and Curator of the Division of Historic Archaeology, 1969–1973. Among his accomplishments at the Smithsonian, he designed and assembled the Hall of Naval History, which opened on 19 June 1952 with speeches by Rear Adm. John B. Heffernan, United States Navy; Dr. Remington Kellogg, Director of the United States National Museum; and Dr. Alexander Wetmore, Secretary of the Smithsonian Institution.

Peterson leads members of National Associates on tour of the underwater archeology exhibits, 1972

Peterson spent 25 years diving on ancient wrecks throughout the world, but with a focus on the Florida Straits, the West Indies and off the Coast of Bermuda. Detailed articles about his explorations of wrecked galleons appeared in the press of the time. Along with legendary Bermudian treasurer hunter Teddy Tucker and others from the Smithsonian, Peterson is credited with developing the grid system for surveying wreck sites. Peterson also taught marine archaeology at the University of Maryland. Numerous reels of film shot and narrated by Peterson, which detail the surface operations of underwater archaeology, are archived at the Smithsonian.

In 1950-51, Peterson visited the wreck of HMS Looe, a 44 gun British frigate wrecked off Looe Key, Florida, in 1744, salvaging, identifying and returning to the Smithsonian a "variety of recovered ballast blocks, cannons, shots, fasteners, pottery, bottles, and coins."

In 1955, along with Edwin Link and Marion Link, he retraced the steps of Christopher Columbus in the New World using journal notes and physical descriptions of islands, ultimately reaching the conclusion that Columbus landed first in Caicos Archipelago, not on San Salvador Island, as is widely believed.

In the spring of 1958, again with Edwin and Marion Link, Peterson helped to lead an expedition to dig out Caesarea Maritima, an ancient Palestinian harbor built by King Herod in the 1st century B.C. The expedition, using a boat equipped with a powerful water jet to remove sand deposits and strong hoists to bring items to the surface, was thought to be the first of its kind.

With his experience of appraising shipwreck finds, Peterson was often asked by the newspapers to provide expert commentary on famous underwater exploration and salvage operations.

Peterson is also the author of several books: including History Under the Sea: A Handbook for Underwater Exploration (1969) which is a detailed guide to exploration and identification of coins, cannon and bottles; and "The Funnel of Gold".

== Life ==
Peterson was born on 8 March 1918 in land-locked Moore, Idaho. He is said to have credited a childhood trip to see the Gulf of Mexico for his lifelong interest in the oceans. Much of his later childhood was spent in Athens, Ohio.

Peterson joined the US Navy in 1943, and learned his deep-sea diving skills during WWII postings to the Solomon, Marshall, Caroline and Philippine Islands. After the war, Peterson studied textile engineering at a naval graduate school and then designed and tested foul weather gear for the US Navy in Antarctica. Peterson held the rank of Commander in the US Naval Reserve.

Peterson graduated from the Southern Mississippi University in 1938, received a master's degree in history from Vanderbilt University in 1940, and attended Lowell Technical Institute from 1945 – 1947.

Peterson died 30 July 2003 at his home in McLean, Virginia, at the age of 85.
