= 1995 in archaeology =

The year 1995 in archaeology involved some significant events.

== Explorations ==
- The Theban Mapping Project makes the great size of the tomb KV5 apparent.

== Excavations ==
- Neolithic ceremonial site of Göbekli Tepe in Turkey commenced under German archaeologist Klaus Schmidt.

== Finds ==
- April - Submarine CSS H. L. Hunley (sunk in action 1864) is located in Charleston Harbor, South Carolina, by Clive Cussler and the National Underwater and Marine Agency after a 14-year search.
- July - French barque La Belle (sunk 1686) is located in Matagorda Bay, Texas.
- November - Submarine Resurgam (sunk 1880) is located off Rhyl, North Wales, by diver Keith Hurley.
- British transport ship SS Empire Heritage (torpedoed in 1944) is located off Tory Island, County Donegal.
- Blakhiya Byzantine cemetery in Palestine was discovered during building works; excavations took place the following year.

== Other events ==
- The ancient sculptures database Arachne is started.
- American installation artist Mark Dion first transforms archaeological investigation into an art exhibit with his History Trash Dig at Fribourg, Switzerland.

== Publications ==
- Tim Cornell – The Beginnings of Rome: Italy and Rome from the Bronze Age to the Punic Wars.

== Deaths ==
- September 12 - Grahame Clark, English archaeologist (b. 1907).
- October 20 - Eric Birley, English archaeologist associated with the excavations of forts on Hadrian's Wall (b. 1906).
