= 2006 in archaeology =

The year 2006 in archaeology includes the following significant events.

== Explorations ==
- Tomb of the Roaring Lions

== Excavations ==
- KV63 - the Valley of the Kings, near Luxor, Egypt.
- Ancient pre-Inca pet cemetery dated to the Chiribaya culture found south of Lima, Peru.
- Ancient pre-Inca tombs complex dated to Middle Sican culture discovered under the Huaca Loro pyramid in Peru; 12 ceremonial tumi knives found.
- The Jewish cemetery, Lucena (Andalusia), the largest such cemetery excavated in Spain, is discovered during construction of the city's southern ring road and excavated.
- Portions of Timișoara Fortress in Romania.

== Finds ==
- July - The Faddan More Psalter, a devotional book, is found in a peat bog in Ireland, where it has been buried for approximately 1200 years.
- December
  - Little Horwood Hoard of Iron Age gold staters from Buckinghamshire, England.
  - River Boyne shipwreck of 1530s found off Drogheda in Ireland.
- Inscriptions in an early form of Linear Elamite discovered at Jiroft in Iran.
- Roman sarcophagus found during work at St Martin-in-the-Fields in London, well outside the walls of Londinium.
- Defences from the Siege of Leith (1560) discovered in Pilrig, Edinburgh, Scotland.
- Wreck of Type A Kō-hyōteki-class midget submarine, sunk in the 1942 attack on Sydney Harbour, discovered off Sydney's Northern Beaches.

== Publications ==
- Steve Burrow - The Tomb-builders in Wales 4000-3000 BC ISBN 9780720005684
- Andrea Carandini - Remo e Romolo: Dai rioni dei Quiriti alla città dei Romani (775/750 - 700/675 a.C. circa) ISBN 9788806180652 and La leggenda di Roma ISBN 9788804634973
- Gwyn Davies - Roman Siege Works ISBN 9780752428970
- Jürg Eggler & Othmar Keel - Corpus der Siegel-Amulette aus Jordanien: vom Neolithikum bis zur Perserzeit ISBN 9783525530146
- Lars Fogelin - Archaeology of Early Buddhism ISBN 9780759107502
- Matthew Johnson - Ideas of Landscape ISBN 9781405178334
- Chris Stringer - Homo Britannicus: the Incredible Story of Human Life in Britain ISBN 9780713997958

== Awards ==
- June - Barry Cunliffe knighted.

== Events ==
- October - British historian Alex Woolf publishes arguments that the Pictish kingdom of Fortriu was located around the Moray Firth region, further north in Scotland than the previous consensus.
- The Kharosti scrolls, the oldest collection of Buddhist manuscripts in the world, are radiocarbon-dated by the Australian Nuclear Science and Technology Organisation (ANSTO). The group confirms the initial dating of the Senior manuscripts to 130-250 CE and the Schøyen manuscripts to between the 1st and 5th centuries CE.

== Deaths ==
- June 6 - Leslie Alcock, English archaeologist (b. 1925)
- August 2 - Richard Avent, British archaeologist, conservationist and civil servant (b. 1948)
- December 1 - Bruce Trigger, Canadian archaeologist and McGill University professor (b. 1937)

== See also ==
- List of years in archaeology
- Karnak
- Pompeii
- Mayapan - recent excavations, near cenote wells.
