= 2003 in archaeology =

== Explorations ==
- Start of Stonehenge Riverside Project (continues to 2008).
- Identification of Neolithic sources of jadeite on Monte Viso and Monte Beigua in Italy.

== Excavations ==
- Start of Ness of Brodgar excavation in Scotland.
- Start of Dungarvan Valley Caves Project in Ireland.
- Full excavation of High Pasture Cave on Skye.

== Finds ==
- April - First British cave art discovered at Creswell Crags.
- June - Staffordshire Moorlands Pan found in England, a Celtic vessel with inscriptions relating to Hadrian's Wall.
- July - Russian monitor Russalka (1867) located by sonar in the Gulf of Finland.
- August - Tse-whit-zen village discovered on the Washington coast during construction work.
- Autumn–December - Prittlewell royal Anglo-Saxon burial near Southend-on-Sea in England, the grave, dated to about 580 AD, of a high-status man, perhaps Saexa (brother to Sæberht of Essex), buried with objects including Christian symbols.
- Boscombe Bowmen's shared grave of around 2300 BCE discovered in southern England.
- Cirebon shipwreck (early 10th century) in the Java Sea, containing a large amount of Chinese Yue ware and important evidence of the Maritime Silk Road.
- Dutch-built fluyt Swan located in Baltic Sea.
- Roman base silver coin hoard at Chalgrove in Oxfordshire, England, including one of Domitianus, briefly ruler of the Gallic Empire.
- Iron Age gold coin hoard at Henley-on-Thames in Oxfordshire, England.

== Publications ==
- Wayne D. Cocroft and Roger J. C. Thomas - Cold War: building for nuclear confrontation 1946-1989.
- Christopher Dyer. "The archaeology of medieval small towns". Medieval Archaeology. 47: 85–114.
- Adrienne Mayor - Greek Fire, Poison Arrows and Scorpion Bombs: biological and chemical warfare in the ancient world.
- Colin Renfrew - Figuring It Out: What are we? Where do we come from? – The parallel visions of artists and archaeologists.
- Ruth M. Van Dyke and Susan E. Alcock (ed.) - Archaeologies of Memory.

== Events ==
- July 17 - The International Committee for the Conservation of the Industrial Heritage adopts the Nizhny Tagil Charter for the Industrial Heritage.
- November 10 - Official opening of the Department of First World War Archaeology in the Institute for the Archaeological Heritage of the Flemish Community (IAP) at Ypres.
- December 26 - The 2003 Bam earthquake devastates the Arg-e Bam in Iran.
- December 31 - Alexandria National Museum inaugurated in Egypt.
- Contemporary and Historical Archaeology in Theory group formed.
- The fake "ancient Egyptian" Amarna Princess statue, actually made by Shaun Greenhalgh, is sold to Bolton Museum in England.

== Deaths ==
- January 22 - Mary Chubb, English archaeologist and author; worked in Egypt and the Near East (b. 1903)
- July 30 - Mendel L. Peterson, American underwater archaeologist (b. 1918)

== See also ==
- List of years in archaeology
