= Moore, Idaho =

- City
- Location of Moore in Butte County, Idaho.
- Coordinates: 43°44′04″N 113°22′02″W
- Country: United States
- State: Idaho
- County: Butte

Area
  - Total: 0.29 sq mi (0.74 km^{2})
  - Land: 0.29 sq mi (0.74 km^{2})
  - Water: 0 sq mi (0.00 km^{2})
- Elevation: 5,473 ft (1,668 m)

Population (2020)
  - Total: 162
  - Density: 570/sq mi (220/km^{2})
- Time zone: UTC-7 (Mountain (MST))
  - Summer (DST): UTC-6 (MDT)
- ZIP code: 83255
- Area codes: 208, 986
- FIPS code: 16-54100
- GNIS feature ID: 2411154

Moore is a city in Butte County, Idaho, United States. The population was 162 at the 2020 census.

== Geography ==
According to the United States Census Bureau, the city has a total area of 0.29 square miles (0.75 km^{2}), all of it land.

== Demographics ==
Historical population
Census	Pop.	Note	%±
1950	256		—
1960	358		39.8%
1970	156		−56.4%
1980	210		34.6%
1990	190		−9.5%
2000	196		3.2%
2010	189		−3.6%
2020	162		−14.3%
2019 (est.)	170		−10.1%
U.S. Decennial Census

=== 2010 census ===
As of the census of 2010, there were 189 people, 79 households, and 50 families residing in the city. The population density was 651.7 inhabitants per square mile (251.6/km^{2}). There were 90 housing units at an average density of 310.3 units per square mile (119.8 units/km^{2}). The racial makeup of the city was 100.0% White. Hispanic or Latino of any race were 3.2% of the population.

There were 79 households, of which 30.4% had children under the age of 18 living with them, 54.4% were married couples living together, 5.1% had a female householder with no husband present, 3.8% had a male householder with no wife present, and 36.7% were non-families. 34.2% of all households were made up of individuals, and 20.3% had someone living alone who was 65 years of age or older. The average household size was 2.39 and the average family size was 3.14.

The median age in the city was 37.2 years. 29.6% of residents were under the age of 18; 6.4% were between the ages of 18 and 24; 21.7% were from 25 to 44; 23.7% were from 45 to 64; and 18.5% were 65 years of age or older. The gender makeup of the city was 49.2% male and 50.8% female.

=== 2000 census ===
As of the census of 2000, there were 196 people, 81 households, and 57 families residing in the city. The population density was 686.3 inhabitants per square mile (265.0/km^{2}). There were 93 housing units at an average density of 325.6 units per square mile (125.7 units/km^{2}). The racial makeup of the city was 97.96% White, 1.02% from other races, and 1.02% from two or more races. Hispanic or Latino of any race were 2.04% of the population.

There were 81 households, out of which 25.9% had children under the age of 18 living with them, 63.0% were married couples living together, 7.4% had a female householder with no husband present, and 28.4% were non-families. 23.5% of all households were made up of individuals, and 13.6% had someone living alone who was 65 years of age or older. The average household size was 2.42 and the average family size was 2.90.

In the city, the population was spread out, with 25.0% under the age of 18, 3.6% from 18 to 24, 25.0% from 25 to 44, 25.0% from 45 to 64, and 21.4% who were 65 years of age or older. The median age was 43 years. For every 100 females, there were 79.8 males. For every 100 females age 18 and over, there were 83.8 males.

The median income for a household in the city was $28,984, and the median income for a family was $30,000. Males had a median income of $31,875 versus $15,208 for females. The per capita income for the city was $14,732. About 10.0% of families and 13.1% of the population were below the poverty line, including 32.6% of those under the age of eighteen and none of those 65 or over.

== See also ==
- List of cities in Idaho
