= Anna Sacconi =

- Born: 28 July 1938

Academic background
- Education: Sapienza University of Rome

Academic work
- Discipline: Classics; Mycenaean Greek; Aegean civilization
- Institutions: Sapienza University of Rome

Anna Sacconi is an Italian Professor Emeritus of Aegean civilisation at La Sapienza, University of Rome. She is known for her work on the corpus of Linear B vase inscriptions and Linear B tablets from Thebes.

== Career ==
Sacconi studied classical philology at La Sapienza, she was first assistant professor of Greek literature and lecturer in Mycenaean philology before becoming professor of Aegean Civilisation in 1975. From 1974 until 1987 she was the director of Istituto per gli Studi Micenei ed Egeo-Anatolici (Institute for Mycenean and Aegean-Anatolian studies) at the Consiglio Nazionale delle Ricerche, where she was also editor of the series Incunabula Graeca and the journal Studi Micenei ed Egeo-Anatolici. She was coordinator of Mycenaean philology within the department of Greek and Latin Philology from 1988 until 2010. Since 1981 she is the representative for Italy in the Comité International Permanent des Etudes Mycéniennes which is affiliated with the Unesco. She is Editor in Chief together with Louis Godart of Pasiphae. Rivista di filologia e di antichità egee.

Sacconi's work includes editions of Linear B texts, including editions of the Linear B vase inscriptions in 1974 and a supplement in 2017. She also published the Linear B tablets from Thebes, along with Vassilis Aravantinos and Louis Godart. She has produced exegetical studies too, regarding religion, myths and society in comparison with the Near Ancient East. Sacconi is a prolific author and has produced more than 150 scientific works, exceeding her technical topic to a wider perspective on the Mycenaean culture.

== Selected publications ==
- with Louis Godart. (2017) Supplemento al Corpus delle iscrizioni vascolari in lineare B. ISBN 9788862279482
- ed. with Ernesto De Miro, Louis Godart. (1996). Atti e memorie del secondo Congresso internazionale di micenologia: Roma-Napoli, 14-20 ottobre 1991. Roma: Gruppo editoriale internazionale. ISBN 9788880110750.
- with Vassilis L. Aravantinos, Eleni Andrikou, Louis Godart, Joanita Vroom. (2006). Thèbes. Fouilles de la Cadmèe. II.2: Les tablettes en linéaire B de la Odos Pelopidou. Le contexte archéologique, La céramique de la Odos Pelopidou et la chronologie du linéaire B. ISBN 9788881473960
- with Vassilis L. Aravantinos, Louis Godart. (2002) Thèbes. Fouilles de la Cadmèe. III: Corpus des documents d’archives en linéaire B de Thèbes (1–433). ISBN 9788881473014
- with Aravantinos, V., Godart, L. (2001). Thèbes: Fouilles de la Cadmée. I, Les tablettes en linéaire B de la Odos Pelopidou: édition et commentaire.
- ed. (1988). Michael Ventris. Work notes on Minoan language research and other unedited papers. Roma: Edizioni dell'Ateneo.
- with Louis Godart. (1978). Les tablettes en linéaire B de Thèbes. Roma: Edizioni dell'Ateneo & Bizzarri.
- (1974). Corpus delle iscrizioni vascolari in lineare B. Roma: Edizioni dell'Ateneo.
