= Arachne (archaeological database) =

Archaeological database

- Website type: Object Database
- Owners: German Archaeological Institute (DAI) and CoDArchLab, University of Cologne
- Creator: Prof. Dr. Reinhard Förtsch
- Website: Arachne3; Arachne4 beta
- Commercial: No
- Registration: Optional

iDAI.objects arachne (short form: Arachne) is the central object-database (administrator: Reinhard Förtsch) of the German Archaeological Institute (DAI) and the Cologne Digital Archaeology Laboratory (CoDArchLab) at the University of Cologne.

Arachne is intended to provide archaeologists and Classicists with a free internet research tool for searching hundreds of thousands of records on objects and their attributes. This combines an ongoing process of digitizing traditional documentation (stored on media that are both threatened by decay and largely unexplored) with the production of new digital object and graphic data. All digital (graphic and textual) information is secure on a Tivoli Storage System (featuring long-term multiple redundancy) and distributed online through the Storage Area Network in Cologne.

== Object modelling and design ==
Arachne's database design uses a model that builds on one of the most basic assumptions one can make about archaeology, classical archaeology or art history: all activities in these areas can most generally be described as contextualizing objects. Arachne tries to avoid the basic mistakes of earlier databases, which limited their object modelling to specific project-oriented aspects, thus creating separated containers of only a small number of objects. All objects inside Arachne share a general part of their object model, to which a more class-specific part is added that describes the specialised properties of a category of material like architecture or topography. Seen on the level of the general part, a powerful pool of material can be used for general information retrieval, whereas on the level of categories and properties, very specific structures can be displayed.

Arachne aims to create interoperability between different systems while protecting the copyrights of the authors. The Arachne database is a central subsystem of the iDAI.welt, the software architecture of the German Archaeological Institute, consisting of various interconnected modules and oriented in their data on open access and in its programming to open source. The modules of the iDAI.welt (e.g. iDAI.objects, IDAI.field, iDAI.gazetteer) are in a constant process of development by new technological and scientific methods and possibilities. Interoperability is becoming increasingly important, especially between Arachne as an image and object database and the various geographical information systems (GIS), used on excavations and surveys, to combine different categories of data while keeping redundant data as low as possible. Another central issue is the provision of URIs (Universal Resource Identifier) for all objects digitally captured. The integration of the CIDOC-CRM and the Open Archives Initiative into iDAI.objects is of great importance. As a partner of the project CLAROSnet a multilingual interface was created. Since April 2009 Arachne is i18n-ready, so the technical framework for internationalization has been implemented: until now (December 2015) the arachne interface is available in German, English and Italian.

== History ==
Arachne was developed in 1995 as a FileMaker-database and benefits since 2001 from the establishment of the Institute for Humanities Computing at the University of Cologne (Historisch-Kulturwissenschaftliche Informationsverarbeitung, HKI), whose students started to use arachne as a realistic test environment for serious programming projects. Thanks to the significant and continuous support by the German Research Foundation (DFG) since 2001 Arachne integrates also negative archives, which have significantly expanded the data stock of Arachne, hence the archives of the photographers Barbara Malter and Gisela Badura-Fittschen were digitized and documented. Since 2003 the negative archives of ancient sculpture of the German Archaeological Institute in Rome were added. All that totaled in 40.000 high quality scans of ancient sculptures, that are presented with a state-of-the-art scientific documentation.

Since 2004 Arachne is operated by a consortium, consisting of the DAI and the CoDArchLab of the University of Cologne. In the same year Arachne has been reworked from the bottom structurally as well as editorially. The data of the FileMaker solution were exported, Arachne was rebuilt from scratch using an MAMP environment. Since 2006 as part of a multiphase-project (Emagines), funded by the DFG, the glass negatives of the German Archaeological Institute were digitized and the records were provided in the arachne database (finally 150,000 scans in 60,000 object records). As a result of the Berlin Sculpture-Network another important data stock were added within the years 2009-2012: the Complete Catalog of Sculptures in the Antiquities Collection of the Berlin State Museums (Antikensammlung der Staatlichen Museen zu Berlin), which includes revised scientific catalog texts, images (colored) and archive material (“Archivalien”), altogether referring to 2,600 sculptures and are freely accessible in the Arachne since 2013. Furthermore, there are approximately 3,500 plaster casts of the Berlin Abgußsammlung, already provided in Arachne and associated with the datasets of the originals mentioned above.

Another major step in the development of Arachne was the provision of engravings (“Stichwerke”) without existing copyrights by the DFG-funded project (2009-2013) "Reception of Antiquity in a Semantic Network: Digital Books, Images and Objects”. 2,300 engraving works have been initially provided in the TEI viewer - specially developed within the project - with OCR full text search. Further digital books and archive material coming from other projects were added. The total amount is shown in the iDAI.bookbrowser which enables a direct link between the represented objects of the 'real world' and their textual descriptions in the digital books. The iDAI.bookbrowser supported by its OAI interfaces the METS metadata standard and is linked to external online portals (Propylaeum, ZVDD).

== Bibliography ==
- Reinhard Förtsch, M. Keuler, Cologne Digital Archaeology Laboratory - Arbeitsstelle für Digitale Archäologie, In: Kölner und Bonner Archaeologica 1, 2011, S. 174-175.
- P. Scheding, R. Krempel, M. Remmy: "Vom Computer reden ist nicht schwer...". Projekte und Perspektiven der Arbeitsstelle für digitale Archäologie. In: Kölner und Bonner Archaeologica 3, 2013, S. 265-270.
- P. Scheding, M. Remmy (Hrsg.): Antike Plastik 5.0:// – 50 Jahre Forschungsarchiv für Antike Plastik in Köln. Münster 2014.

== See also ==
- List of academic databases and search engines
