= Medea Norsa =

Italian scholar (1877–1952)

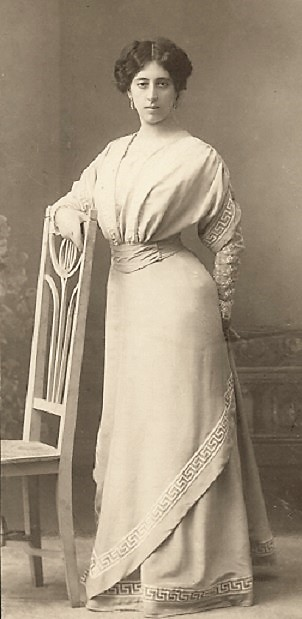

Medea Vittoria Irma Norsa (1877–1952) was an Italian papyrologist and philologist. She headed the Istituto Papirologico Girolamo Vitelli in Florence from 1935 to 1949.

== Early life and education ==
Norsa was born to Michele Norsa and Silvia Vittoria Krosna in Trieste on 26 August 1877, the oldest of four children. She was christened Medea Vittoria Irma on 16 September 1877. After Silvia's death in 1886, her father married Caterina Giovanna Furlani in 1894 and had three more children.

Norsa's heritage has been discussed by several scholars: Antonio Carlini calls her father Jewish, while Gino Bandelli describes her father's family as having ceased all relations with the local Jewish community in the Austro-Hungarian empire after the mid-1800s. Her father's family is thought to have hailed originally from Mantua.

Norsa studied at a girls' school in Trieste from 1891 and took the maturità exam in classics in 1900 at another school in Koper. She then left for university in Vienna, initially to study Italian literature. However, she then moved to the Istituto di Studi Superiori in Florence in 1901 after one year in Vienna. Norsa's year in Vienna and subsequent transfer to an Italian university was likely reflective of typical behaviour by Italian scholars in the Austro-Hungarian empire, to which Trieste belonged at the time. In 1906, she earned a degree in literature with full marks from the University of Florence, with a dissertation on Sophocles' Ajax and Aeschylus' Seven Against Thebes.

In December 1906, she began to collaborate with her mentor Girolamo Vitelli and obtained a diploma from the school of palaeography, still at the Istituto di Studi Superiori.

== Career ==
Between 1907 and 1911, Norsa returned to Trieste and worked as a teacher at her former school. In this period, she also published part of her university dissertation in the school's journal.

In 1911, Norsa returned to Florence to work with Vitelli on the first volume of Papiri Greci e Latini della Società Italiana (PSI), which was published in 1912. Their ongoing collaboration continued up to Vitelli's death in 1935, and resulted in 11 volumes of the series.

For much of her career, Norsa continued to teach, first in licei classici in towns in Tuscany, then in Florence where she also obtained a university teaching post in classical papyrology in 1924.

Norsa was made conservator of the papyrus collection at the University of Florence in 1925. From 1926 until the beginning of the Second World War, she travelled to Egypt regularly to acquire papyri and participate in excavation campaigns. In 1935, she succeeded Vitelli as head of the Istituto Papirologico at the same university, which took on its founder's name to become the Istituto Papirologico Girolamo Vitelli. Norsa remained in the position of Institute head until 1949, overseeing excavations at Antinoopolis and another two fascicules of the PSI.

Anti-Semitism directed against Norsa under Italian fascism made her stint as Institute head difficult. Mario Capasso has argued that the reason for her not having been appointed professor at the University of Florence during this period was that the university considered her Jewish. The publication of some tables of literary papyri, originally intended to be published by the Institute of Classical Philology at Sapienza University of Rome, was repeatedly put off due to the insistence of Vincenzo Ussani, the institute director, on first clarifying Norsa's racial status. The tables were eventually published by the Scuola Normale Superiore in Pisa. Norsa's application to visit Egypt for the second season of the Antinoopolis excavation in 1939 prompted an enquiry by the government into her racial status, meaning she was not able to go. The enquiry eventually declared her race to be mista non ebrea (mixed, not Jewish).

During her time at the Institute, Norsa played a key role in the acquisition of further papyri and ostraka, using funds offered by Enrico Rostagno, and maintained a network of other papyrologists and antiquities dealers. She is credited with the recognition and publication, in 1937, of a fragment of Sappho found on an ostracon (Sappho 2), and with the acquisition for the Institute of a papyrus copy of Callimachus' Lock of Berenike (PSI IX, 1092).

In 1947–8, Norsa stepped down as head of the papyrology course at the University of Florence and was replaced by Vittorio Bartoletti, another student of Vitelli. She retired from the position of head of the Istituto Papirologico in 1949, and was made the honorary president of the Association Internationale de Papyrologie in the same year.

== Later life ==
Norsa's house had been bombed in March 1944 during the Second World War, destroying all of her books and papers and killing her sister-in-law, Eugenia. Unable to afford any rebuilding work, she spent the rest of her life as a temporary guest first at the Laurentian Library, then at various religious institutions. She suffered a stroke in 1947 and then a period of ill health that prompted her gradual retirement from teaching and leadership of the Institute.

The last three years of Norsa's life were spent at a care home run by Dominican nuns. She died in Florence on 28 July 1952, aged 74.

== Posthumous legacy ==
In 1993, a posthumous festschrift was published in her honour entitled Omaggio a Medea Norsa, edited by Mario Capasso.

In 2008, the Centro Papirologico "Medea Norsa" was founded by Silvia Strassi at the University of Trieste, named after Norsa. This moved to the Accademia Fiorentina di Papirologia e di Studi sul Mondo Antico in Florence in 2014.

== Select bibliography ==
- (with Girolamo Vitelli) Papiri greci e latini, I-XIII, Firenze 1912–1953.
- 'La collezione fiorentina di papiri greci e latini,' Atene e Roma, n.s. 2., 1921, pp. 202–207.
- Papiri greci e collezioni italiane: scritture documentarie. Roma 1929–1933.
- (with Girolamo Vitelli) Il Papiro Vaticano Greco 11: 1. Phaborinou peri phyges. 2. Registri fondiari della Marmarica, Città del Vaticano, 1931.
- (with Girolamo Vitelli) 'Frammenti di scolii agli Aitia di Callimaco.' Bulletin de la Société Royale d'Archéologie d'Alexandrie 28, 1933, pp. 123–132.
- (with Girolamo Vitelli) Diegeseis di poemi di Callimaco in un papiro di Tebtynis, Firenze 1934.
- 'Un frammento di fisica aristotelica in un papiro fiorentino,' Annali della Scuola Normale Superiore di Pisa 7, 1938, pp. 1–12.
- La scrittura letteraria greca dal secolo IV A.C. all’VIII D.C., Firenze 1939.
- 'Due frammenti fiorentini del papiro di Bacchilide P.Brit.Mus. 733. Una circolare ai pagarchoi della Tebaide del secolo VIII,' Annali della Scuola Normale Superiore di Pisa 10, 1941, pp. 155–170.
- 'Un frammento del Romanzo di Nino,' in Scritti dedicati alla memoria di Ippolito Rosellini nel primo centenario della morte (4 giugno 1943), Firenze, 1945, pp. 191–197.
- Papiri greci delle collezioni italiane. Scritture documentarie dal III sec. a.C. al sec. VIII d.C., Roma, 1946.
- 'Papiro Vaticano greco n. 2037A,' Aegyptus 32, 1952, pp. 232–240.
