= 2008 in archaeology =

This page lists major events of 2008 in archaeology.

== Excavations ==
- March - The first excavation inside the sarsen circle since 1964 is started at Stonehenge.
- Start of 2008–09 excavation of 18th century steel works at Trenton, New Jersey.
- Discovery and excavation of the Savaria Mithraeum.

== Finds ==
- March 12–17 - Search for HMAS Sydney and German auxiliary cruiser Kormoran: David Mearns leads a search team which finds the Australian cruiser HMAS Sydney and the German auxiliary cruiser Kormoran, which both sank following a mutually destructive engagement off Western Australia in 1941.
- April 1 - Remains of a Portuguese carrack presumed to be the Bom Jesus (lost 1533) on the coast near Oranjemund in Namibia.
- May
  - HMS Victory (1737) in the Western Approaches.
  - Tugboat Robert C. Pringle (1903) in Lake Michigan.
- September
  - 'Venus of Hohle Fels', the oldest known example of figurative art.
  - First of the Salme ships from the Viking Age, containing the remains of seven men, is found in Salme village on the island of Saaremaa, Estonia. Several weapons, everyday items, gaming pieces and animal remains are also found.
  - Dornier Do 17 bomber WrkNr 1160 in Goodwin Sands in the Thames Estuary.
- October 9 - Serbian archaeologists find a copper axe in Prokuplje, Serbia believed to be 500–800 years older than the actual beginning of the Copper Age, suggesting that the human use of metal is older than previously believed.
- November - A Dutch amateur discovers 109 Celtic coins dating to the 1st century near Maastricht. Archaeologists report that the coins were produced by the Eburones. 39 of the coins were gold, marking this the first Celtic gold treasury found in the Netherlands.
- HMS London (1660) in the Thames Estuary.
- The 'West Yorkshire Hoard' of Anglo-Saxon gold ornaments is first discovered by a metal detectorist near Leeds in England.
- First hoard of denarii at Edge Hill, Warwickshire, England, found.

== Publications ==
- Barry Cunliffe - Europe Between the Oceans: 9000 BC-AD 1000 (Yale University Press).
- Laurent Olivier - Le sombre abîme du temps: mémoire et archéologie (Seuil).
- Andrew Stewart - Classical Greece and the Birth of Western Art (Cambridge University Press).

== Events ==
- February 10 - 2008 Namdaemun fire: An arsonist sets fire to the 550-year-old Namdaemun gate in Seoul, South Korea, causing severe damage to the structure.
- Obelisk of Axum, repatriated to Ethiopia in 2005, is unveiled at Axum.

== Awards ==
- June - Archaeologist Larry Zimmerman receives the Peter Ucko Memorial Award at the 2008 World Archaeological Congress held in Dublin, Ireland.

== Deaths ==
- September 20 - Elizabeth Eames, British archaeologist (b. 1918)
