= 2010 in archaeology =

This page lists major events of 2010 in archaeology.

== Excavations ==
- March 26: Archaeologists begin excavations at the site of William Shakespeare's last home, New Place in Stratford-upon-Avon (continuing in 2011).
- April 2: Teams of anthropologists and archaeologists begin searching the Fresh Kills Landfill on Staten Island for human remains of victims of the September 11 attacks in 2001. Over 30 fragments of human remains are subsequently identified.
- May: Rescue excavations at the Buddhist site of Mes Aynak in Afghanistan begin (continuing until July 2011).
- Excavations of the Roman site at Bloomberg London begin, continuing until 2013 and including discovery of the Bloomberg tablets.

== Finds ==
- April 9: In England, metal detectorist Dave Crisp discovers the Frome Hoard, 52,503 Roman coins dating to the period 253 to 305, one of the largest hoards ever found in Britain.
- May
  - A fragment of a clay tablet is discovered in the Ophel section of the City of David in Jerusalem. The fragment, with a surface of 2 by 2.8 centimetres (0.79 by 1.10 in), is the oldest piece of writing from Jerusalem yet discovered, dating back to the 14th century BC. The high quality of the Akkadian writing indicates that it was engraved by a royal scribe and speaks to the importance of Jerusalem as a political center in that era.
  - In Cumbria, England, a metal detectorist discovers an almost complete Roman cavalry helmet.
- June
  - Skeletons featuring marks that could have resulted from a violent death are uncovered during an ongoing investigation in Driffield Terrace near the centre of York in England. Archaeologists believe the cemetery to be that of gladiators. Bite marks on one skeleton suggest that the gladiator was bitten by a large carnivore which would be consistent with gladiatorial battles in Ancient Rome.
  - The Areni-1 shoe, the world's oldest leather shoe is found in a cave in the Vayots Dzor Province of Armenia. The 5,500-year-old shoe dates back to approximately 3,500 BC and is in excellent condition, due in large part to being buried under a pile of sheep dung.
  - Vatican officials announce that the earliest-known icons of the Apostles Peter and Paul have been discovered in the catacombs of an eight-story office building in Rome. The images date to the second half of the 4th century and are believed to decorate the tomb of a Roman noblewoman. The tomb also houses the oldest known images of the Apostles John and Andrew.
- July
  - Egyptian archaeologists unveil a recently discovered double-tomb in Saqqara. The tomb is the resting place of a father and son who served as heads of the royal scribes. The tomb dates to the 6th dynasty making it 4,300 years old. Archaeologists hail this find as one of the most colorful Old Kingdom tombs ever discovered. They also believe that, when excavated, this area just west of the Step Pyramid of Djoser, could be one of the largest cemeteries in ancient Egypt.
  - The first Philistine temple is unearthed at Tell es-Safi, Israel, the historic site of the city of Gath. The find provides archeological context for the Biblical narrative of Samson (Book of Judges chapters 13 to 16), who destroys a Philistine temple by pulling the two main pillars together.
  - The second (and larger) of the Salme ships from the Viking Age, containing the remains of more than 20 dead men, is found in the village of Salme on the island of Saaremaa, Estonia. Several weapons, everyday items, gaming pieces and animal remains are also found.
  - Parks Canada finds wreck of HMS Investigator (1848) on Banks Island in the Beaufort Sea.
- July 22: Archaeologists using ground-penetrating radar announce discovery of an apparent new henge at Stonehenge in England.
- August
  - Stone point arrowheads are recovered from Sibudu Cave, South Africa, which date back 64,000 years. The arrowheads have traces of blood and a plant resin glue. This is the oldest known use of arrows.
  - The Theban Desert Road Survey, a program led by Yale University, announces the discovery of an ancient Egyptian settlement along an ancient caravan route in the Western Desert. The settlement was a major administrative and economical center, estimated to have been in use from 1650 BC to 1550 BC.
- September: An 8th-century BC Moabite temple is discovered near the city of Madaba, Jordan. The temple contains around three hundred religious artifacts, including a figurine of the animal god Hadad. The artifacts will be displayed in the Jordan Archaeological Museum.
- Undated: Excavations at Taposiris Magna in Egypt uncover a huge headless granite statue of a Ptolemaic pharaoh and portions of the original gateway to a temple dedicated to the god Osiris.

== Events ==
- January 18–October 22: BBC Radio 4 broadcasts A History of the World in 100 Objects based on the collections of the British Museum.
- June
  - Bones found in a church in Porto Ercole, near Grosseto in Tuscany, are identified as probably belonging to the painter Caravaggio (d. 1610).
  - The largest Aztec stone sculpture with its original coloring is unveiled at an exposition at the Templo Mayor museum in Mexico City. The sculpture which was discovered in 2007 depicts the Aztec god Tlaltecuhtli. The exposition also displays many offerings found along with the sculpture.
- September 13: First showing of Werner Herzog's documentary film Cave of Forgotten Dreams, about the Chauvet Cave (at the Toronto International Film Festival).
- October 7: First publication of the identification of Yersinia pestis as the cause of the 14th century Black Death.
- Laboratory analysis of the bones of a close relative of Lucy (Australopithecus) reveal how early hominins walked.

== Institutions ==
- July 10: Kaman-Kalehöyük Archaeological Museum opens in Turkey.

== Publications ==
- April 8: Publication of Denisovan DNA.
- May 7: Scientists conducting the Neanderthal genome project publish the first draft of their DNA sequencing, containing enough of the Neanderthal genome to suggest that Neanderthals and early modern humans may have interbred.
- June
  - A radiocarbon dating study of plant matter, usually from offerings at Egyptian kings' burial sites, is published in Science. The researchers have compared these dates with presumed historical dates using Bayesian inference to determine if there is any correlation. Among the findings is that the Old Kingdom began between 2691 and 2625 BC, while the New Kingdom began between 1570 and 1544 BC.
  - A British archaeologist announces that sedimentary evidence suggests that Neanderthals entered Kent soon after the land bridge from mainland Europe appeared, about 100,000 years BP, 40,000 years earlier than previously thought.
- July: Archaeologists working for the Natural History Museum excavating a coastal site at Happisburgh in East Anglia announce that it was occupied by a date as early as 950,000 years BP, the earliest and northernmost evidence of human expansion into Eurasia.
- August 10: Archaeologists working on the Stone Age site at Star Carr in North Yorkshire announce that they have found the earliest surviving remains of a house in Britain, dating from at least 8,500 years BC.
- August 12: Researchers from the Max Planck Institute for Evolutionary Anthropology publish indirect evidence for stone tool use dating to 3.39 million years BP from Dikika, Ethiopia.
- P. J. Capelotti - The Human Archaeology of Space: Lunar, Planetary and Interstellar Relics of Exploration.
- David J. Mattingly - Imperialism, Power, and Identity: Experiencing the Roman Empire.
- Bjørnar Olsen - In Defense of Things: Archaeology and the Ontology of Objects.
- Donald B. Redford - City of the Ram-Man: the Story of Ancient Mendes.

== Deaths ==
- February 2: Donald Wiseman, former Professor of Assyriology at the University of London (b. 1918)
- September 12: Honor Frost, Mediterranean underwater archaeologist (b. 1917)
- October 28: Ehud Netzer, Professor of archeology at Hebrew University known for his excavations related to Herod the Great (b. 1934)
