= 1997 in archaeology =

The year 1997 in archaeology involved some significant events.

== Excavations ==
- The exhumation of Yagan's head.
- Major salvage excavation of Neolithic-era Ashkelon begun by Yosef Garfinkel of the Hebrew University of Jerusalem (continues to 1998).
- Excavation at Jericho by Lorenzo Nigro and Nicolò Marchetti.
- Excavation of cargo of Vietnamese porcelain in the South China Sea off Hội An (Vietnam), directed by Mensun Bound, begins.

== Publications ==
- Barry Cunliffe – The Ancient Celts (Oxford University Press)
- Sarah Milledge Nelson (ed.) – The Archaeology of Northeast China: Beyond the Great Wall (London: Routledge).
- Sarah Milledge Nelson – Gender in Archaeology: Analyzing Power and Prestige (Walnut Creek: AltaMira Press).
- Bernard Sergent – Genèse de l'Inde (Paris: Payot).
- R. E. Witt – Isis in the Ancient World (Baltimore: Johns Hopkins University Press).

== Finds ==
- January 14: Finding of the probable remains of Aristotle's Lyceum in Athens by Greek archaeologists.
- March: Pioneer Helmet found in a warrior grave at Wollaston, Northamptonshire, England.
- April: Roman coin hoard found at Patching, West Sussex, England.
- Herto Man, remains of a 160,000- to 154,000-year-old human, discovered in Ethiopia.
- Recovery of Homo skeletal remains at least 350,000 years old from the Sima de los Huesos (Pit of Bones) at the archaeological site of Atapuerca in northern Spain begins.
- Megalosaurus and Cetiosaurus footprints are identified at Ardley, Oxfordshire, by Christopher Jackson.
- Scauri shipwreck of c.400–450 is found off Pantelleria.
- Fragment of a fifth Incantada sculpture in Thessaloniki, northern Greece.
- Terpsichore statuette in Dodona, Greece.
- The remains of a Byzantine church in Jabalia in the Gaza Strip are discovered during roadworks.

== Events ==
- July 10: In London, scientists report their DNA analysis findings from a Neandertal skeleton which support the out of Africa theory of human evolution placing an "African Eve" at 100,000 to 200,000 years ago.
- July 19: Emergency designation of the 18th century wreck of the Hanover off the coast of Cornwall under the Protection of Wrecks Act 1973.
- September: Portable Antiquities Scheme begins in England as a pilot voluntary scheme for the recording of small finds of base metal or non-metallic archaeological artefacts found by metal detectorists or other members of the public.
- Bryn Euryn, an archaeological site near Colwyn Bay, is identified as the probable base of Cynlas Goch, a 6th-century Welsh king.
- Experimental archaeology: Construction of Guédelon Castle in France using 13th century techniques begins.

== Deaths ==
- May 17 - James Bennett Griffin, American archaeologist (b. 1905).
- June 30 - Su Bingqi, Chinese archaeologist (b. 1909)
- November 13 - Elisabeth Munksgaard, Danish historian and archaeologist (b. 1924).
- November 6 - Anne Stine Ingstad, Norwegian archaeologist (b. 1918).
- October 4 - Anne Strachan Robertson, Scottish archaeologist and numismatist (b. 1910)
