= Louis Godart =

Italian-Belgian archaeologist

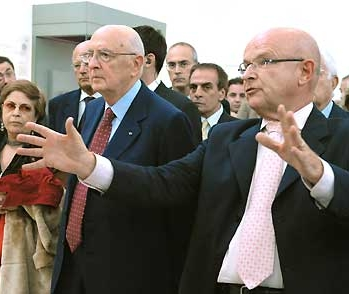
Louis Godart, right, with Italy's President Giorgio Napolitano

Louis Godart (born 12 August 1945) is an Italian archaeologist of Belgian origins. He is a specialist in Mycenaean archaeology and philology and holds the chair of philology at the University of Naples Federico II. He is also currently Director for the Conservation of Artistic Heritage of the Italian President.

== Studies ==
Godart was born in Bourseigne-Vieille, a Belgian municipality. He attended middle and high school at the Collège de Bellevue in Dinant, Belgium until 1963. Afterwards, he studied classical philology at the University of Louvain, graduating in 1967. Godart received a PhD in literature and philosophy at the Free University of Brussels in 1971. In 1977, he earned another doctorate in arts and humanities at the Sorbonne in Paris. Godart has served as a member of the Accademia dei Lincei, Società Nazionale di Scienze, Académie des Inscriptions et Belles-Lettres, Accademia Pontaniana, German Archaeological Institute, and the Academy of Athens. He was also the professor of Aegean civilization at the University of Naples Federico II.

Godart studies Aegean writing systems, specializing in Mycenaean Linear B tablets. He has worked on the corpus of Cretan hieroglyphics, including parts of the Linear A and Linear B corpora. Godart has also been conducting excavations on the island of Crete since 1969. He has excavated areas such as Monastiraki, Malia, and Chania. In 1982 he began an excavation on the Minoan site of Apodoulou, Crete. This archaeological mission was a joint program with the University of Naples Federico II, Greek Ministry of Culture, and Yannis Tzedakis, former Director General of Antiquities of Greece. Godart has organized several national and international conferences in protohistoric Mediterranean archaeology and philology, including the 1992 Micenologia II International Congress in Naples.

He is the author of 29 books, 74 monographs, and 235 scientific articles, published in Italy and abroad on topics relating to the civilizations of the Mediterranean, especially the Aegean civilization.

== See also ==
- Phaistos Disc
