= Swash Channel Wreck =

Shipwreck near Poole Harbour, Dorset, United Kingdom

The Swash Channel Wreck is the remains of an early 17th-century armed merchantman possibly of Dutch origin wrecked outside of Poole Harbour. The vessel was approximately 40 m long and has been predicted to be around 600 tonnes. The ship was probably involved with the beginning of internationalization.

The Location of the Swash Channel Wreck

The archaeological evidence, including the small number of guns, the position of the galley, wooden sheathing, ornate carvings and that only one row of knees is present on the wreck, suggest that the vessel was a high-status merchantman bound for the tropics. Dendrochronology dates the ship's timbers to 1628 from the Dutch/German Border. Approximately 40% of the port side of the wreck remains from above the keel line to the stern and bow castles.

== Designation ==
The site was designated under the Protection of Wrecks Act 1973; it was designated on 10 December 2004, when heritage minister Andrew McIntosh said: "This is an important wreck ... it is likely to be well preserved and rare in terms of its quality and the quantity of the surviving structure ... This order is particularly timely as the location of the wreck has been publicised and we need to protect it from potential damage by divers visiting the site."

The wreck is a Protected Wreck managed by Historic England.

== Site investigations ==
The site was first located in March 1990 when the Dutch dredger Scaldis hit an obstruction whilst dredging close to Buoy No 3 in the Swash Channel. Substantial timbers and a single iron cannon were brought to the surface. The cannon ended up in Poole Museum store but maritime archaeology in Poole was focused on the Studland Bay Wreck and no further investigation took place.

In 2004 Wessex Archaeology on behalf of Poole Harbour Commissioners and Poole Borough Council conducted a geophysical survey, and the site was re-discovered as a sidescan sonar anomaly Wessex Archaeology undertook a designated site assessment for English Heritage in 2005, recording a zone of structure approximately 20 m in length and reporting that further remains were known to exist. The structure included parts of the ship's forecastle, complete with galley and gunports, which is extremely rare as ships’ upper works are usually destroyed during the wrecking. Importantly the structure showed signs of being recently exposed, and after a short time it was seen to be degrading.

Bournemouth University was approached by English Heritage in 2006 to investigate the possibility of undertaking a monitoring project as part of a student-training project. The purpose of the 2006 season was to set up a long-term "strategy for the future management of the SCW ... [for the] ... 2006–2011" season.

The archaeological investigation discovered that the protective hessian sandbags placed in 2005 had degraded exposing the wreck. The site was larger than thought; covering a 50 m by 40 m area with structural remains over 40 m by 20 m. More work than was originally predicted was required, and with no further funding available, Bournemouth University negotiated sponsorship with a number of local organisations, including Jenkins Marine , Poole Museum and Dorset Workboats to cover this extra work.

Since 2006 Bournemouth University continued to work on the wreck as a student training project allowing students to undertake the majority of the work including trials for establishing the most cost-effective method of in situ stabilisation, and creating photomosaics of the site showing the site a whole for the first time. BU continued to monitor the site noting that sediment was being lost lowering sand levels across the site, by up to 350 mm in some areas. The gradual exposure of new material has reached the point where extensive archaeological deposits that contain extremely vulnerable organic material are being exposed, rapidly degraded and eventually lost.

In 2010 English Heritage agreed to fund an excavation of the site by a BU led team of marine archaeologists undertook the largest underwater excavation in the UK since the Mary Rose. The site was divided into 6m grids where two teams began excavating the sediment and recovering the small finds, once a grid was excavated the areas were photographed to create a photomosaic of the site. A third team worked on the recording and dismantling of the Bow Castle ready for raising and preserving.

The Bow Castle was raised in May 2011, and the 8-metre-long carved rudder was raised in 2013. In March 2017, the ship was named as the Fame. In early 2026, the ship's absent hull washed ashore, likely as a result Storm Chandra.

== Artifacts ==
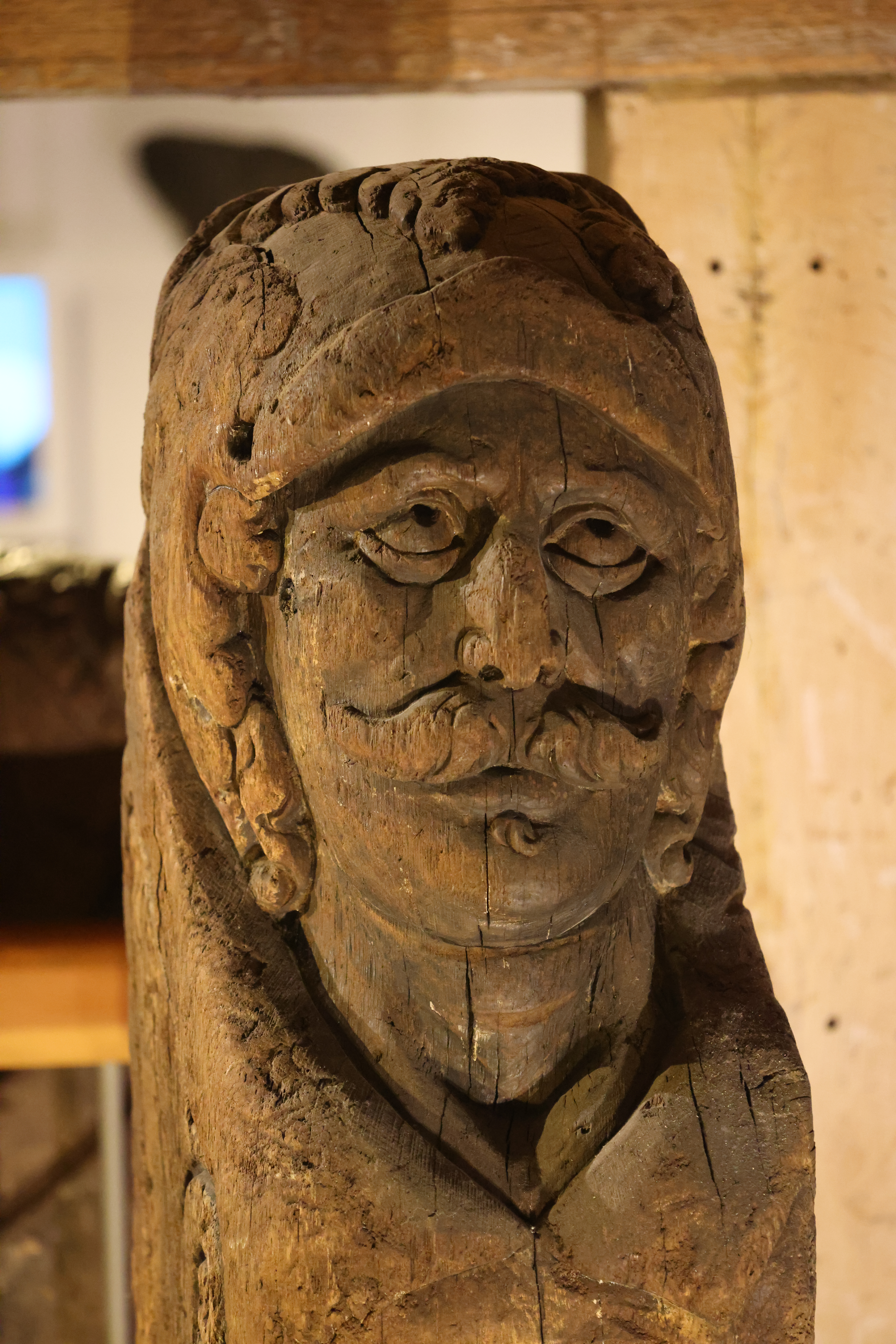
The carving from the top of the rudder post

Over 1000 artifacts have been brought up as of 2010 these include various rigging blocks, barrels, pottery and personal items such as shoes, wooden bowls and tankards. The ship has also yielded 5 carvings of baroque style including two mermen, cherubim, and a classical style head carved on top of the rudder. These carvings are being conserved by York Archaeological Trust with funding from BU and MAST.
