= Seaton Carew Wreck =

Protected wrecksite in England

Coordinates: 54°39′29″N 1°10′49″W

The Seaton Carew Wreck is a protected wrecksite lying in the intertidal zone at Seaton Carew. Prior to 1996 the wreck had been completely covered by the sand of the beach, but it was exposed in 1996 and 2002 and has been regularly exposed since 2004. The wreck is of a type of vessel known as a collier brig which would have been ubiquitous in the 18th and 19th centuries and is unusual on the North-East coast for the high degree of preservation. The wreck is a Protected Wreck managed by Historic England.

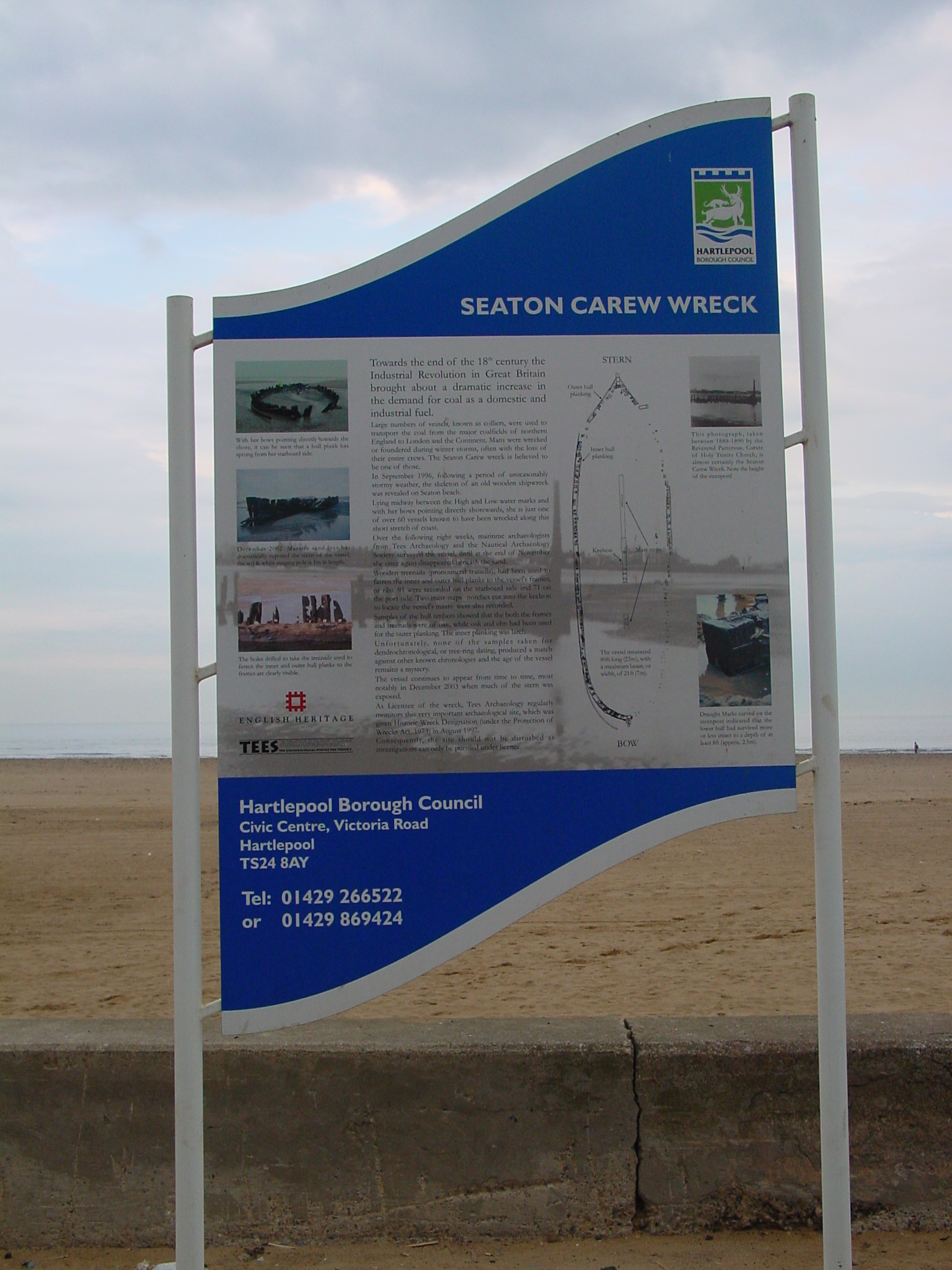
The noticeboard explaining the protected wreck at Seaton Carew

== Discovery ==
On 4 August 1996, two local people, Derek Hodgson and Joe Howey reported discovering the remains of a wreck on Seaton Carew beach. The wreck had not been seen before, at least in their lifetimes, but a recent storm, some 3 or 4 days before had stripped sand from the beach and exposed the wreck. They contacted Tees Archaeology, who began a rapid assessment of the wreck with the help of volunteers from the Nautical Archaeology Society.

The wreck was lying in the inter-tidal zone about halfway between the high and low water levels, giving about 6 hours for assessment between tides. It quickly became clear that what the sea had revealed, the sea was again going to conceal, as, with each tide, the sand was gradually returning to cover the wreck.

== Description ==
The wreck lies with her bows towards the shore. It is approximately 25m long and 7m broad. The frames are oak and fastened with treenails. It appears to be of a type of vessel known as a collier brig, a sturdy type of vessel favoured by Captain James Cook for his voyages of exploration.

It appears to have been subject to salvage as frames have been cut off to a consistent level, leaving the remains of the masts and lower third of the hull. Damage to the port side near the stern may have been made as part of the salvage operation to remove its cargo, possibly of coal. A photograph taken by a local priest, James Pattison in 1898 appears to show the same wreck with the hull salvaged but the stern post still intact.

== Designation ==
The importance of the wreck was recognised by the designation on 8 August 1997 under the Protection of Wrecks Act.

The original interpretation panel erected near the site in August 2000 was replaced by a new panel in 2005.

== Reappearances ==
Tees Archaeology as the licensee has responsibility for monitoring the wrecksite. The wreck was substantially (though briefly) uncovered in 2002 and again in 2004 allowing further recording to be carried out. In 2004 and 2005 the wreck was partially exposed for most of the time, but in 2006 and 2007 it was rarely, if at all, exposed. Making regular appearances again in 2019 onwards.

== See also ==
- Archaeology of shipwrecks
- Maritime archaeology
- List of designations under the Protection of Wrecks Act
- HM Bark Endeavour
