= Pioneer (submarine) =

Confederate submarine from the American Civil War

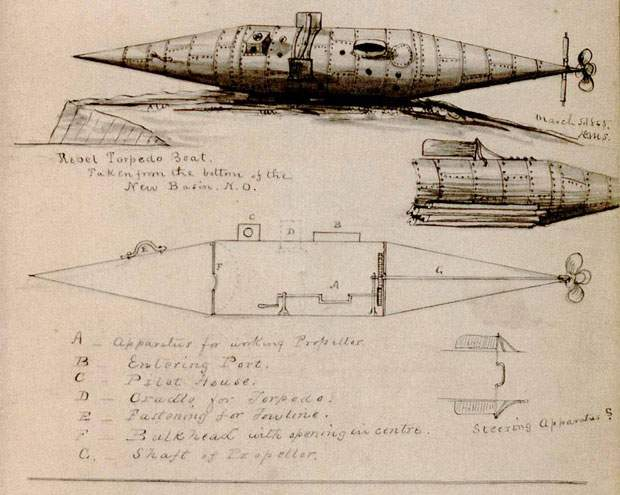
- The Confederate submarine Pioneer drawn by Ensign David M. Stauffer of the Mississippi Squadron, 1865

History

Confederate States of America
- Name: Pioneer
- Builder: Horace Lawson Hunley, James McClintock, and Baxter Watson
- Laid down: 1861
- Launched: 1862
- Fate: Scuttled 25 April 1862; Raised and sold for scrap ca. 1868

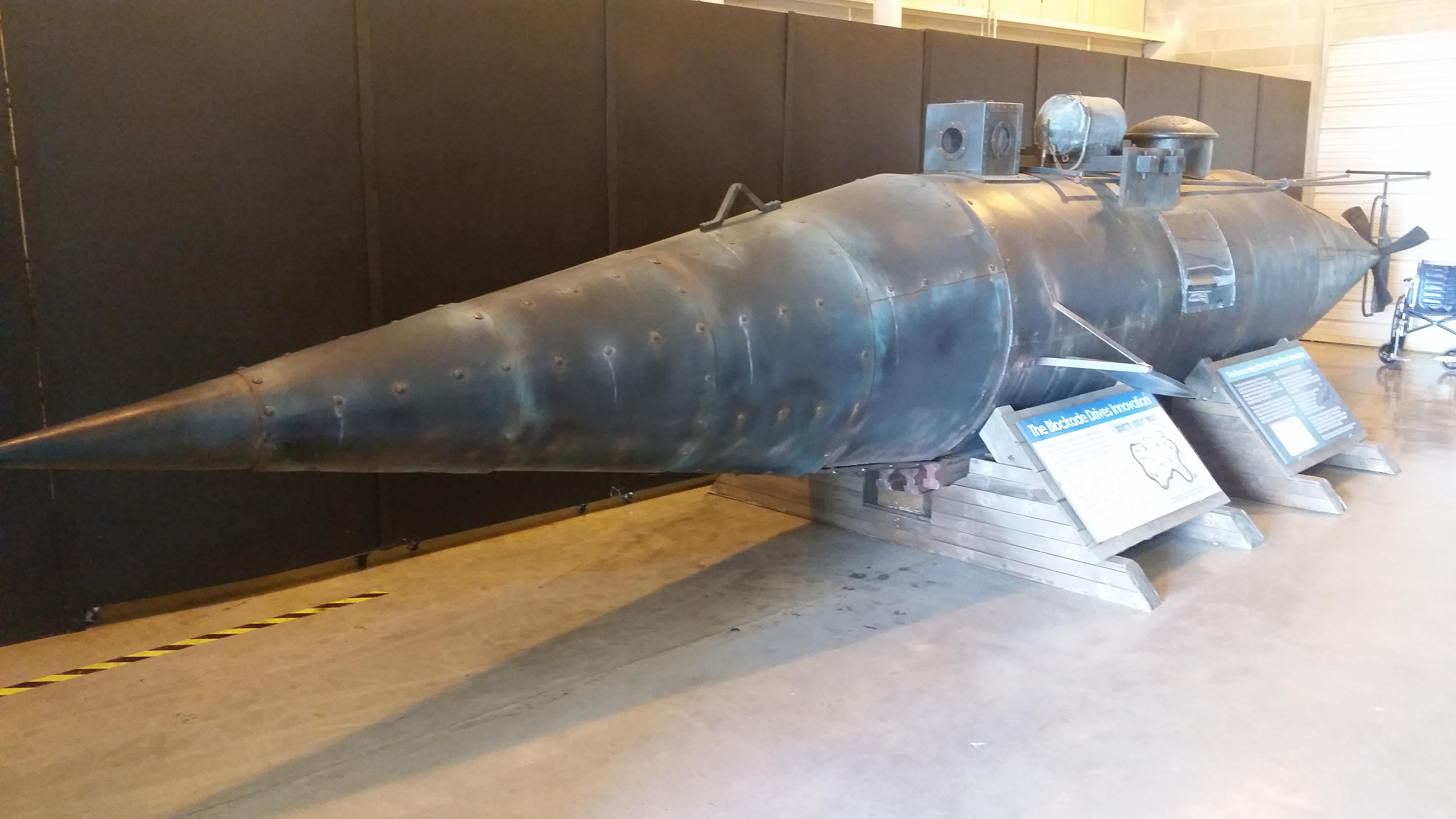
Pioneer full-scale replica on display at the Warren Lasch Conservation Center

Pioneer was the first of three submarines privately developed and paid for by Horace Lawson Hunley, James McClintock, and Baxter Watson.

While the United States Navy was constructing its first submarine, USS Alligator, during the American Civil War in late 1861, the Confederates were doing so as well. Horace L. Hunley, James McClintock, and Baxter Watson built Pioneer in New Orleans, Louisiana. It was the first of three submarines financially backed by Hunley (Pioneer, Pioneer II, and Hunley). The Pioneer was thirty feet long and four feet in diameter. The crew consisted of a pilot and one man to rotate the propeller manually. It was equipped with an explosive that would be attached to the hull of an enemy vessel and blown up using a clockwork mechanism. Pioneer was tested in February 1862 in the Mississippi River, and later was towed to Lake Pontchartrain for additional trials where it successfully managed to sink a schooner, but the Union advance towards New Orleans the following month prompted the men to abandon development and scuttle Pioneer in the New Basin Canal on 25 April 1862. The team followed with the Pioneer II or American Diver, built after they relocated to Mobile, Alabama.

The scuttled Pioneer was raised and examined by Union troops. The Times-Picayune of New Orleans of 15 February 1868 reported Pioneer had been sold for scrap.

The Bayou St. John submarine, now in the collection of the Louisiana State Museum, was for decades misidentified as Pioneer. The Bayou St. John submarine and Pioneer may have undergone trials at about the same time and confusion between the two may date back to contemporary accounts; it is not clear which of the two was constructed first.

A life-size model of Pioneer can be viewed and explored at Maritime Museum Louisiana, in Madisonville, Louisiana.
