= H. L. Hunley =

Submarine of the Confederate States of America

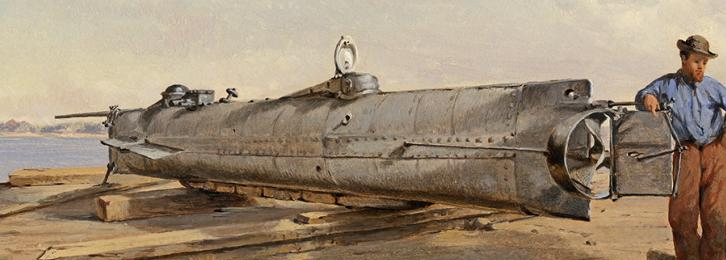
- 1864 painting by Conrad Wise Chapman

History

Confederate States
- Name: H. L. Hunley
- Namesake: Horace Lawson Hunley
- Builder: James McClintock
- Laid down: Early 1863
- Launched: July 1863
- Acquired: August 1863
- In service: 17 February 1864
- Out of service: 17 February 1864
- Status: Raised in 2000 and preserved in H. L. Hunley Museum

General characteristics
- Displacement: 7.5 short tons (6.8 t)
- Length: 39.5 ft (12.0 m) (unconfirmed)
- Beam: 3.83 ft (1.17 m)
- Propulsion: Hand-cranked ducted propeller
- Speed: 4 kn (7.4 km/h; 4.6 mph) (surface)
- Complement: 2 officer, 6 enlisted
- Armament: 1 spar torpedo
- H. L. HUNLEY (submarine)
- U.S. National Register of Historic Places
- Location within South Carolina Location within the United States
- Nearest city: North Charleston, South Carolina
- Coordinates: 32°44′0″N 79°46′0″W
- Built: 1864
- Architects: Park & Lyons; Hunley, McClintock & Watson
- Website: www.hunley.org
- NRHP reference No.: 78003412
- Added to NRHP: December 29, 1978

H. L. Hunley, also known as Hunley, CSS H. L. Hunley, or CSS Hunley, was a submarine of the Confederate States of America that fought in the American Civil War. Hunley demonstrated the advantages and dangers of undersea warfare. She was the first combat submarine to sink a warship (USS Housatonic), although Hunley was not completely submerged, and following her attack was lost along with her crew before she could return to base. She was named for her inventor, Horace Lawson Hunley, shortly after she was taken into government service under the control of the Confederate States Army at Charleston, South Carolina.

Hunley, nearly 40 ft (12 m) long, was built at Mobile, Alabama, and launched in July 1863. She was then shipped by rail on 12 August 1863 to Charleston. Hunley (then referred to as the "fish boat", the "fish torpedo boat", or the "porpoise") sank on 29 August 1863 during a test, killing five members of her crew. She sank again on 15 October 1863, killing all eight of her second crew, including Horace Hunley himself. Both times Hunley was raised and returned to service.

On 17 February 1864, Hunley attacked and sank the 1,240-ton United States Navy screw sloop-of-war Housatonic, which had been on Union blockade duty in Charleston's outer harbor. Hunley did not survive the attack and sank, taking all eight members of her third crew with her, and was lost. Twenty-one crewmen died in the three sinkings of Hunley during her short career.

Finally located in 1995, Hunley was raised in 2000 and is on display in North Charleston, South Carolina, at the Warren Lasch Conservation Center on the Cooper River. Examination in 2012 of recovered Hunley artifacts suggested that the submarine was as close as 20 ft (6.1 m) to her target, Housatonic, when her deployed torpedo exploded, which caused the submarine's sinking.

== Historical context ==
The Civil War, April 12, 1861 – April 9, 1865, was a domestic American war where the Union (also called the North) was locked in combat with the Confederates (also called the South).

In the beginning of the war, combat was fought with bayonets, horses, wooden ships, and imprecise artillery. During the course of the conflict the weaponry changed and mines, accurate guns, more deadly bullets, torpedoes, and "ironclad" ships became a new standard. Though most of the fighting occurred on land, a critical element of the war was at sea. Whichever side controlled the coastline also controlled shipping imports from Europe and Coastal America, which contained critical resources such as clothes, food, artillery, medicine, and, at times, reinforcements. The Hunley was created to destroy the Union blockade and help gain this all-important coastline advantage.

== Predecessors ==
Horace Lawson Hunley provided financing for James McClintock to design three submarines: Pioneer in New Orleans, Louisiana, American Diver built in Mobile, and Hunley.

While the United States Navy was constructing its first submarine USS Alligator, in late 1861, the Confederacy was developing their own. Likely having within them an incessant loyalty to the Confederate states as well as understanding the financial gains that would come from sinking enemy ships, Hunley, McClintock, and Baxter Watson first built Pioneer. She was tested in February 1862 in the Mississippi River and was later towed to Lake Pontchartrain for additional trials. The Union advance towards New Orleans caused the men to abandon development, however, and Pioneer was scuttled the following month. McClintock noted the significance that a boat capable of moving in any direction at any depth could be made, but ultimately decided that such a vessel could be improved. Hunley, Watson, and McClintock moved to Mobile to develop a second submarine, American Diver. They collaborated with Park & Lyons machine shops owners, Thomas Park and Thomas Lyons, in the construction of the vessel. Their efforts were supported by the Confederate States Army. Lieutenant William Alexander of the 21st Alabama Infantry Regiment was assigned to oversee the project. The builders experimented with several methods of providing the new submarine with self-propulsion, including McClintock's electromagnetic drive, followed by a custom steam engine, but eventually settled on a simple hand-cranked propulsion system as they felt that the time and money lost in implementing such an engine would not be worth the trouble. American Diver was ready for harbor trials by January 1863, but she proved too slow to be practical. Nonetheless, it was decided to tow the submarine down the bay to Fort Morgan and attempt an attack on the Union blockade. However, the submarine foundered in the rough waters caused by foul weather and the currents at the mouth of Mobile Bay and sank. The crew escaped, but the boat was not recovered.

== Construction and testing ==
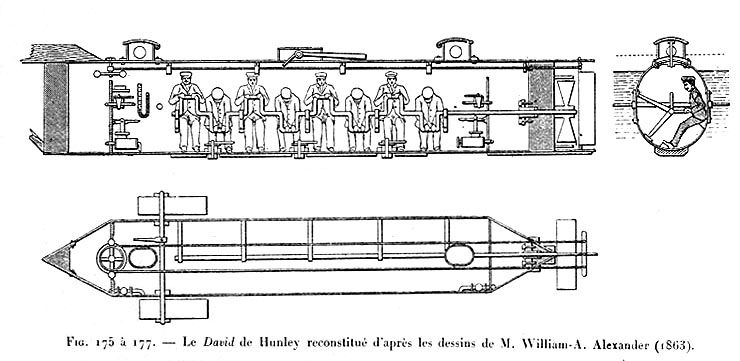
Inaccurate inboard profile and plan drawings, after rough sketches made by W.A. Alexander (1863)

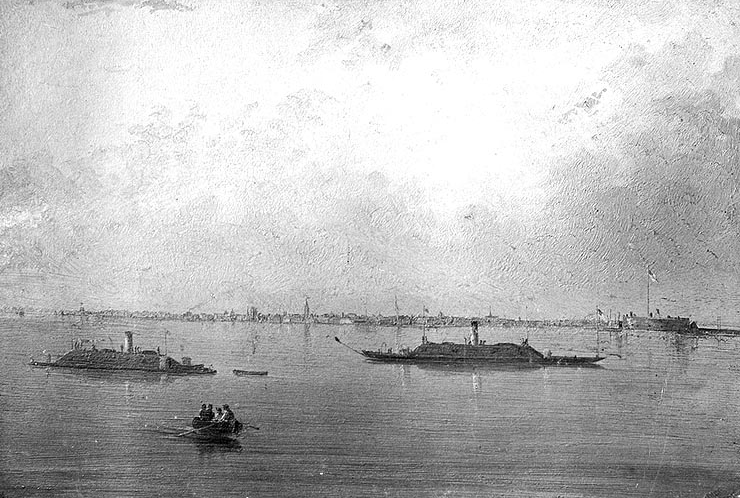
CSS Chicora and CSS Palmetto State

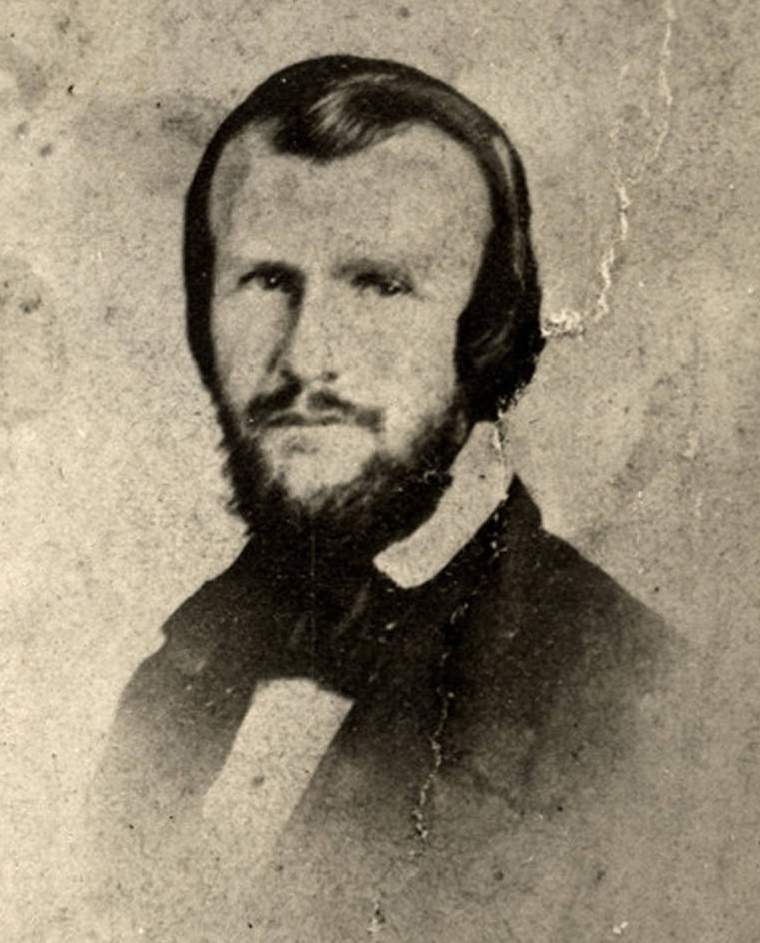
Horace Lawson Hunley, the submarine's namesake and inventor

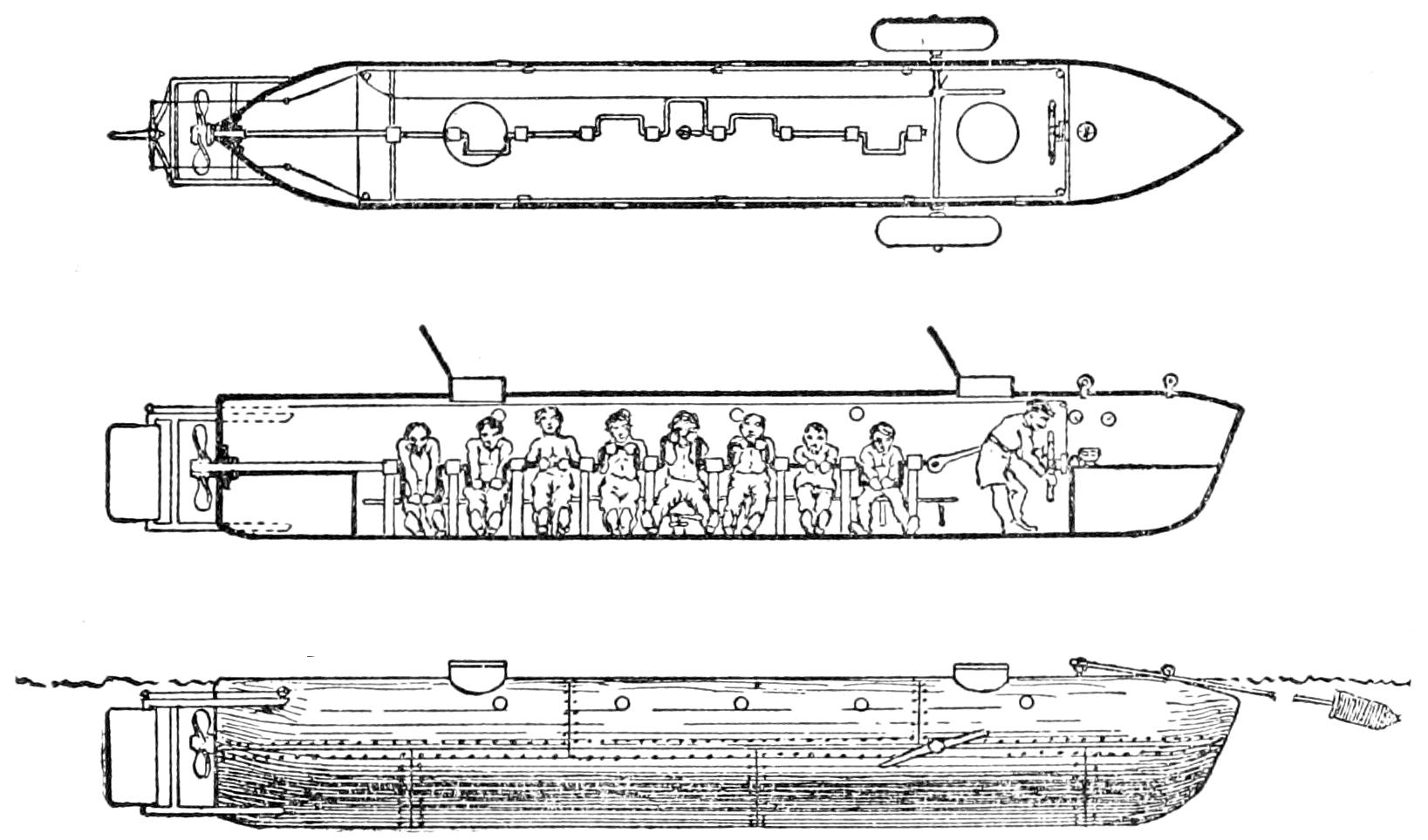
Drawings of H. L. Hunley from 1900.

Construction of Hunley began soon after the loss of American Diver. At this stage, Hunley was variously referred to as the "fish boat", the "fish torpedo boat", or the "porpoise". Legend held that Hunley was made from a cast-off steam boiler—perhaps because a cutaway drawing by William Alexander, who had seen her, showed a short and stubby machine. In fact, Hunley was designed and built for her role, and the sleek, modern-looking craft shown in R.G. Skerrett's 1902 drawing is an accurate representation. Each end was equipped with ballast tanks that could be flooded by valves or pumped dry by hand pumps. Extra ballast was added using iron weights bolted to the underside of the hull. If the submarine needed additional buoyancy to rise in an emergency, the iron weight could be removed by unscrewing the heads of the bolts from inside the vessel.

The hull of the ship is estimated to originally have been 4 feet 3 inches (1.30) in diameter. The two hatches, accessible by means of conning tower, located in the forward and aft of the vessel, are estimated to have originally measured at 16.5 inches (42 cm) in width and 21 inches (53 cm) in length. The small sizing of the hatches and the cramped quarters made entering, exiting, and maneuvering about the ship remarkably difficult. Hunley was designed for a crew of eight, seven to turn the hand-cranked ducted propeller at about 3.5 horsepower (2.6 kW), and one to steer and direct the boat. At the height of her speed, Hunley could reach 4 knots [Wills, 2017].

By July 1863, Hunley was ready for a demonstration. Supervised by Confederate Admiral Franklin Buchanan, Hunley successfully attacked a coal flatboat in Mobile Bay. Following this, the submarine was shipped by rail to Charleston, South Carolina, on 12 August 1863. However, the Confederate military seized the submarine from her private builders and owners shortly after arriving, turning her over to the Confederate Army. Hunley would operate as a Confederate Army vessel from then on, although Horace Hunley and his partners would remain involved in her further testing and operation. While sometimes called CSS Hunley, she was never officially commissioned into service.

Confederate Navy Lieutenant John A. Payne of CSS Chicora volunteered to be Hunley's captain, and seven men from Chicora and CSS Palmetto State volunteered to operate her. On 29 August 1863, Hunley's new crew was preparing to make a test dive when Lieutenant Payne accidentally stepped on the lever controlling the sub's diving planes as she was running on the surface. This caused Hunley to dive with one of her hatches still open. Payne and two others escaped, but the other five crewmen drowned.

H. L. Hunley crew lost 29 August 1863:

- Michael Cane
- Nicholas Davis
- Frank Doyle
- John Kelly
- Absolum Williams

The Confederate Army took control of Hunley, with all orders coming directly from General P. G. T. Beauregard, with Lt. George E. Dixon placed in charge. On 15 October 1863, Hunley failed to surface after a mock attack, killing all eight crewmen. Among these was Hunley himself, who had joined the crew for the exercise and possibly had taken over command from Dixon for the attack maneuver. The Confederate Navy once more salvaged the submarine and returned her to service.

H. L. Hunley crew lost 15 October 1863:

- Horace Hunley
- Thomas S. Parks
- Henry Beard
- R. Brookbanks
- John Marshall
- Charles McHugh
- Joseph Patterson
- Charles L. Sprague

== Armament ==
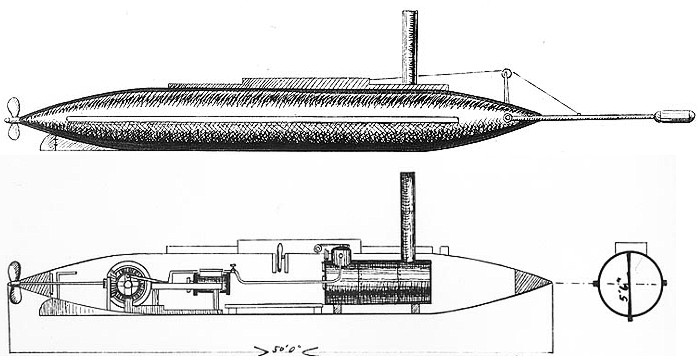
Plans of CSS David

Hunley was initially intended to attack by using a floating explosive charge with a contact fuze (a torpedo in 19th-century terminology). The Hunley's methodology of deploying the explosive charge consisted of them diving beneath the ship and catching the charge on the side/hull of the vessel and re-emerging outside of the blast range of the explosive. This plan was discredited and not used as the possibility of Hunley becoming entangled in the rope, the rope drifting away from the ship, or the charge exploding on the submarine was too great.

Instead, a spar torpedo—a copper cylinder containing 135 pounds (61 kilograms) of black powder—was attached to a 22-foot (6.7 m)-long wooden spar, as seen in illustrations made at this time. Mounted on Hunley's bow, the spar was to be used when the submarine was 6 ft (1.8 m) or more below the surface. Previous spar torpedoes had been designed with a barbed point: the spar torpedo would be jammed in the target's side by ramming and then detonated by a mechanical trigger attached to the submarine by a line so that as she backed away from her target, the torpedo would set off. However, archaeologists working on Hunley discovered evidence, including a spool of copper wire and components of a battery, that it may have been electrically detonated. In the configuration used in the attack on Housatonic, it appears Hunley's torpedo had no barbs and was designed to explode on contact as it was pushed against an enemy vessel at close range. After Horace Hunley's death, General Beauregard ordered that the submarine should no longer be used to attack underwater. An iron pipe was then attached to her bow, angled downwards so the explosive charge would be delivered sufficiently underwater to make it effective. This was the same method developed for the earlier David surface attack craft used successfully against the USS New Ironsides. The Confederate Veteran of 1902 printed a reminiscence authored by an engineer stationed at Battery Marshall who, with another engineer, made adjustments to the iron pipe mechanism before Hunley left on her last fatal mission on 17 February 1864. A drawing of the iron pipe spar, confirming her David-type configuration, was published in early histories of submarine warfare.

== Attack on Housatonic ==
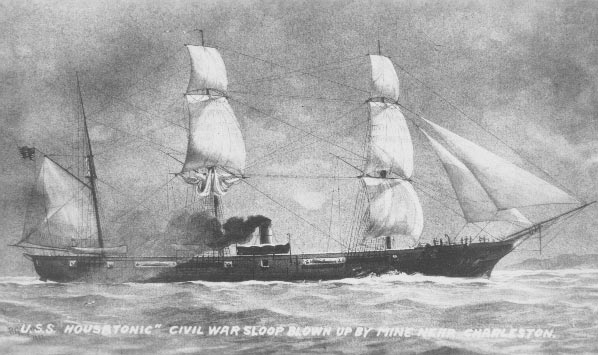
USS Housatonic

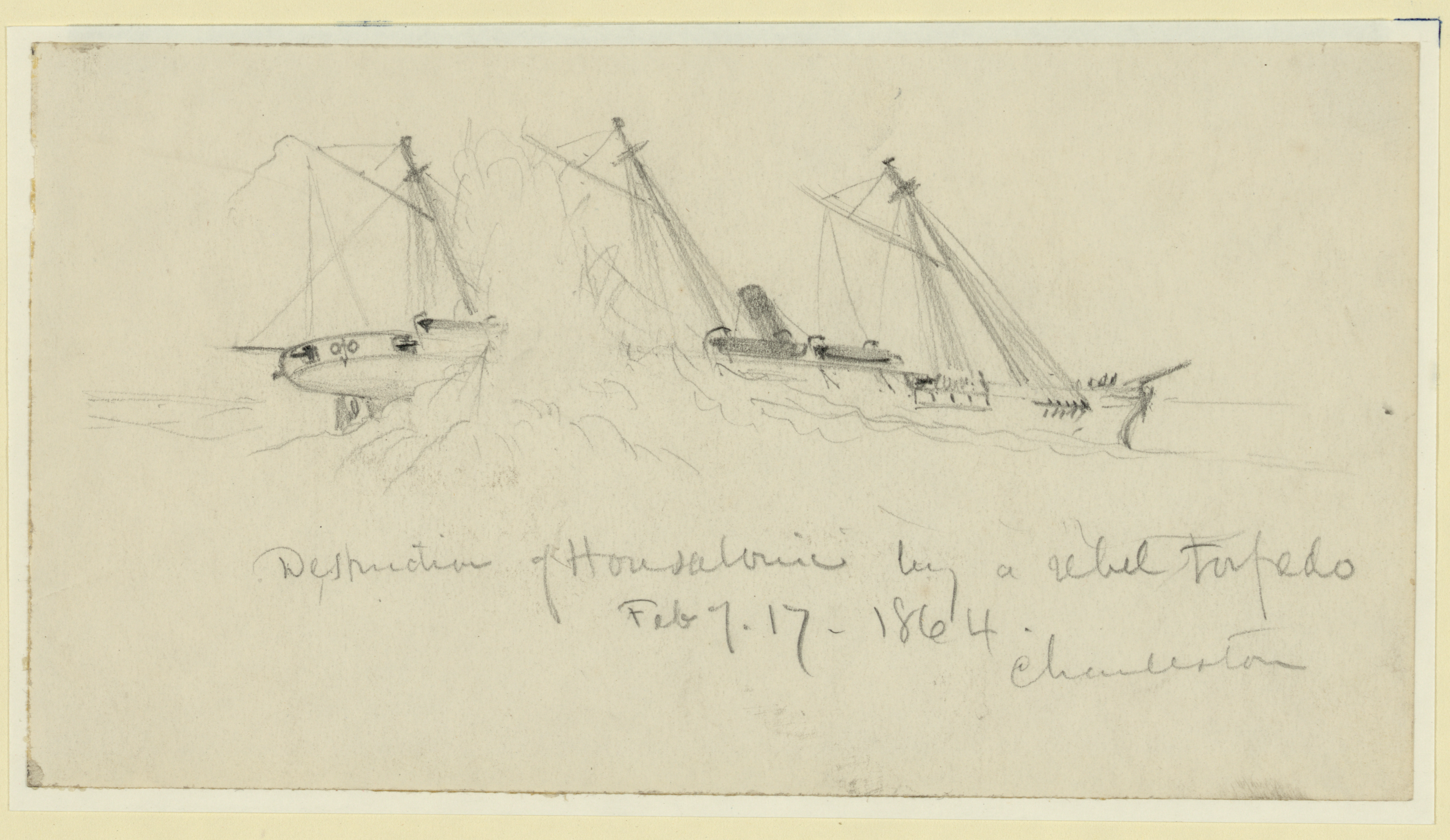
Destruction of the USS Housatonic; sketch by war artist William Waud

Hunley made her only attack against an enemy target on the night of 17 February 1864. The target was United States Navy ship USS Housatonic, a 1,240-long-ton (1,260 t) wooden-hulled steam-powered screw sloop-of-war with 12 large cannons, which was stationed at the entrance to Charleston, about 5 miles (8.0 kilometres) offshore. Hunley happened to be on patrol around that area at the time. Helmed by Lieutenant George E. Dixon with a crew of seven and desperate to break the naval blockade of the city, H. L. Hunley successfully attacked Housatonic, ramming Hunley's only spar torpedo against the enemy's hull. The torpedo was detonated, sending Housatonic to the bottom in three minutes, along with five of her crewmen. Hunley and her crew went missing after the attack. They were not found for over 100 years.

== Disappearance ==
After the attack, H. L. Hunley failed to return to her base. At one point, there appeared to be evidence that Hunley survived as long as one hour following the attack, which occurred at about 20:45. The day after the attack, the commander of Battery Marshall reported that he had received "the signals" from the submarine indicating she was returning to her base. The report did not say what the signals were. A postwar correspondent wrote that "two blue lights" were the prearranged signals, and a lookout on Housatonic reported he saw a "blue light" on the water after his ship sank. "Blue light" in 1864 referred to a pyrotechnic signal in long use by the U.S. Navy. It has been falsely represented in published works as a blue lantern; the lantern eventually found on the recovered H. L. Hunley had a clear, not a blue, lens. Pyrotechnic "blue light" could be seen easily over the four-mile (6 km) distance between Battery Marshall and the site of Hunley's attack on Housatonic.

After signaling, Dixon's plan could have been to take his submarine underwater to make a return to Sullivan's Island, although he left no confirmed documentation of this plan. At one point, the finders of Hunley suggested she was unintentionally rammed by USS Canandaigua when that warship was going to rescue the crew of Housatonic, but no such damage was found when she was raised from the bottom of the harbor. Instead, all evidence and analysis eventually pointed to the instantaneous death of Hunley's entire crew at the moment of the spar torpedo's contact with the hull of Housatonic. Upon removal of the silt inside the hull, the skeletons of the crewmembers were found seated at their stations with no signs of skeletal trauma. In October 2008, scientists reported they had found that the crew of Hunley had not set her pump to remove water from the crew's compartment, and this might indicate she was not flooded until after they died. In January 2013, it was announced that conservator Paul Mardikian had found evidence of a copper sleeve at the end of Hunley's spar. This finding indicated the torpedo had been attached directly to the spar, meaning the submarine may have been less than 16 feet (5 m) from Housatonic when the torpedo exploded. In 2018, researchers reported that the keel blocks, which the crew could release from inside the vessel to allow the sub to surface quickly in an emergency, had never been released.

The short distance between the torpedo and the vessel, in addition to the signs that the crew died instantaneously and without a struggle to survive, led a team of blast trauma specialists from Duke University to theorize that the Hunley's crew was killed by the blast itself, which could have transmitted pressure waves inside the vessel without damaging its hull. Their research, which included scaled experiments with live black powder bombs, provided data indicating the crew was likely killed by the explosion of their own torpedo, which could have caused immediate pulmonary blast trauma. The Duke team's experiments and results were published August 2017 in the peer-reviewed journal PLOS One and eventually became the subject of the book In the Waves: My Quest to Solve the Mystery of a Civil War Submarine. Their conclusions have been disputed by archaeologists with the Naval History and Heritage Command (NHHC).

Years after Hunley went missing, when the area around the wreck of Housatonic was surveyed, the sunken Hunley was found on the seaward side of the sloop, where no one had considered looking before. This later indicated that the ocean current was going out following the attack on Housatonic, taking Hunley with her to where she was eventually found and later recovered.

== Recovery of wreckage ==
Hunley's discovery was described by William Dudley, Director of Naval History at the Naval Historical Center as "probably the most important find of the century."

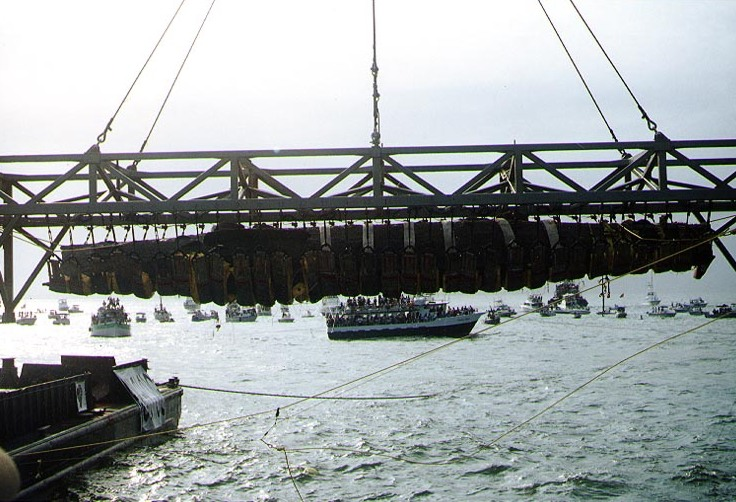
H. L. Hunley, suspended from a crane during her recovery from off of Charleston Harbor, August 8, 2000

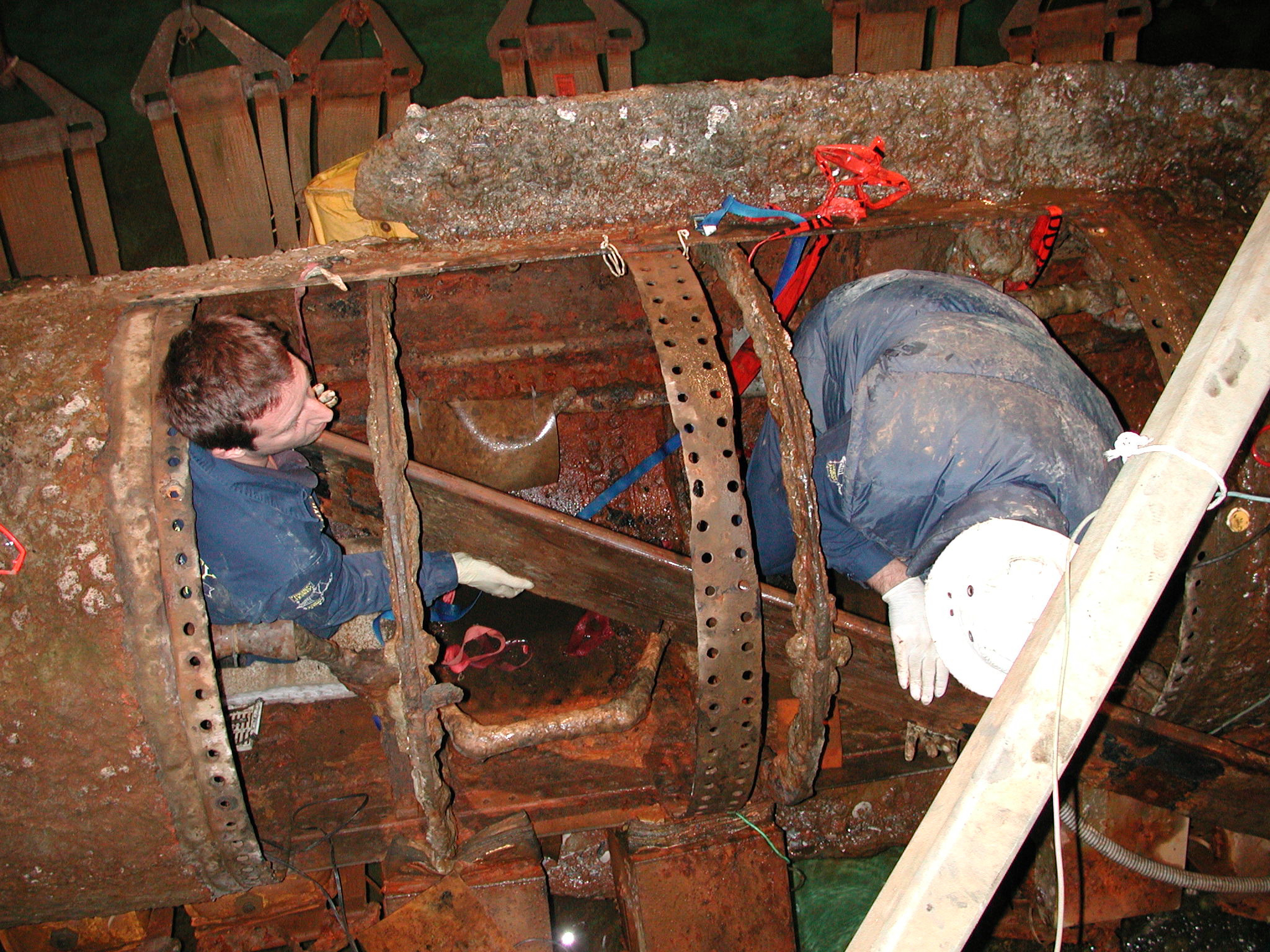
Removing the first section of the crew's bench at the Warren Lasch Conservation Center, January 28, 2005

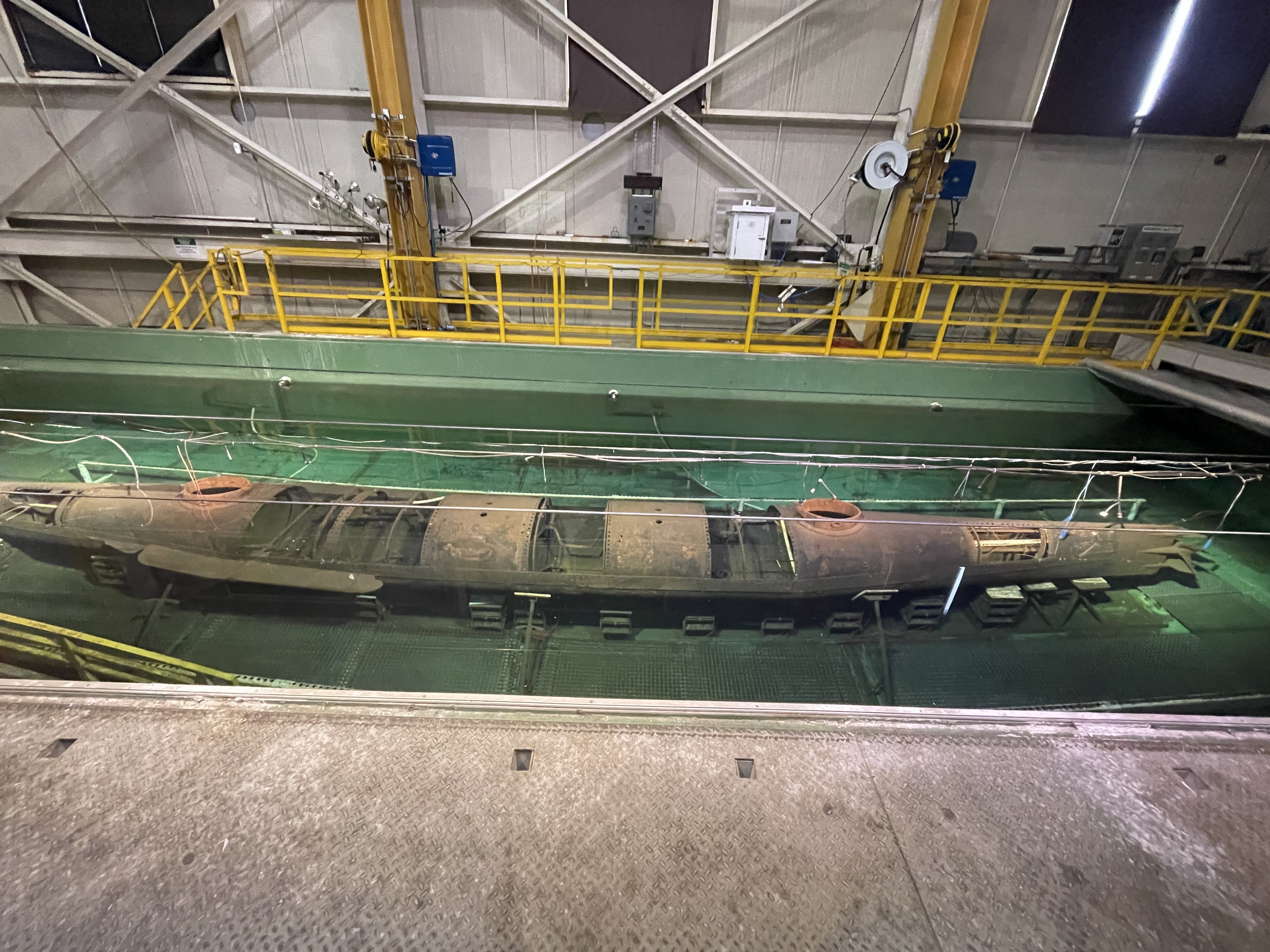
H. L. Hunley in sodium hydroxide bath, August 2025

The discovery of Hunley has been claimed by two different individuals. Underwater archaeologist E. Lee Spence, president, Sea Research Society, reportedly discovered Hunley in 1970, and has a collection of evidence claiming to validate this, including a 1980 Civil Admiralty Case. The court took the position that the wreck was outside the jurisdiction of the U.S. Marshals Office, and no determination of ownership was made.

On 13 September 1976, the National Park Service submitted the Sea Research Society's (Spence's) location for H. L. Hunley for inclusion on the National Register of Historic Places. Spence's location for Hunley became a matter of public record when H. L. Hunley's placement on that list was officially approved on 29 December 1978. Spence's book Treasures of the Confederate Coast, which had a chapter on his discovery of Hunley and included a map complete with an "X" showing the wreck's location, was published in January 1995.

Diver Ralph Wilbanks located the wreck in April 1995 while leading a NUMA dive team originally organized by archaeologist Mark Newell and funded by novelist Clive Cussler, who announced the find as a new discovery and first claimed that the location was in about 18 ft (5.5 m) of water over one mile (1.6 km) inshore of Housatonic, but later admitted to a reporter that that was false. The wreck was actually 100 yd (91 m) away from and on the seaward side of Housatonic in 27 feet (8.2 m) of water. The submarine was buried under several feet of silt, which had concealed and protected the vessel for over a hundred years. The divers exposed the forward hatch and the ventilator box (the air box for the attachment of her twin snorkels) to identify her. The submarine was resting on her starboard side, at about a 45-degree angle, and was covered in a 1/4 to 3/4 inch (0.64 to 1.91 cm) thick encrustation of rust bonded with sand and seashell particles. Archaeologists exposed part of the ship's port side and uncovered the bow dive plane. More probing revealed an approximate length of 37 feet (11 m), with the entire vessel preserved under the sediment.

On 14 September 1995, at the official request of Senator Glenn F. McConnell, chairman, South Carolina Hunley Commission, E. Lee Spence, with South Carolina Attorney General Charles M. Condon signing, donated Hunley to the State of South Carolina. Shortly thereafter, NUMA disclosed to government officials Wilbank's location for the wreck which, when finally made public in October 2000, matched Spence's 1970s plot of the wreck's location well within standard mapping tolerances. Spence avows that he discovered Hunley in 1970, revisiting and mapping the site in 1971 and again in 1979, and that after he published the location in his 1995 book he expected NUMA to independently verify the wreck as Hunley, not to claim that NUMA had discovered her. NUMA was actually part of a SCIAA expedition directed by Dr. Mark M. Newell and not Cussler. Dr. Newell swore under oath that he used Spence's maps to direct the joint SCIAA/NUMA expedition and credited Spence with the original discovery. Dr. Newell credits his expedition only with the official verification of Hunley.

The in situ underwater archaeological investigation and excavation culminated with the raising of Hunley on 8 August 2000. A large team of professionals from the Naval Historical Center's Underwater Archaeology Branch, National Park Service, the South Carolina Institute of Archaeology and Anthropology, and various other individuals investigated the vessel, measuring and documenting her before removal. Once the on-site investigation was complete, harnesses were slipped underneath the sub and attached to a truss designed by Oceaneering International. After the last harness had been secured, the crane from the recovery barge Karlissa B hoisted the submarine from the sea floor. She was raised from the open waters of the Atlantic Ocean, just over 3.5 nautical miles (6.5 km) from Sullivan's Island outside the entrance to Charleston Harbor. Despite having used a sextant and hand-held compass thirty years earlier to plot the wreck's location, Dr. Spence's 52 m (171 ft) accuracy turned out to be well within the length of the recovery barge, which was 64 m (210 ft) long. On 8 August 2000, at 08:37, the sub broke the surface for the first time in more than 136 years, greeted by a cheering crowd on shore and in surrounding watercraft, including author Clive Cussler. Once safely on her transporting barge, Hunley was shipped back to Charleston. The removal operation concluded when the submarine was secured inside the Warren Lasch Conservation Center, at the former Charleston Navy Yard in North Charleston, in a specially designed tank of fresh water to await conservation until she could eventually be exposed to air.

The exploits of Hunley and her final recovery were the subject of an episode of the television series The Sea Hunters, called Hunley: First Kill. This program was based on a section ("Part 6") in Clive Cussler's 1996 non-fiction book of the same name (which was accepted by the Board of Governors of the Maritime College of the State University of New York in lieu of his Ph.D. thesis).

In 2001, Clive Cussler filed a lawsuit against E. Lee Spence for unfair competition, injurious falsehood, civil conspiracy, and defamation. Spence filed a countersuit against Cussler, in 2002, seeking damages, claiming that Cussler was engaging in unfair competition, tortious interference, and civil conspiracy by claiming Cussler had discovered the location of the wreck of Hunley in 1995 when she had already been discovered by Spence in 1970, and that such claims by Cussler were damaging to Spence's career, and had caused him damages over $100,000. Spence's lawsuit was dismissed through summary judgment in 2007, on the legal theory that, under the Lanham Act, regardless of whether Cussler's claims were factual or not, Cussler had been making them for over three years before Spence brought his suit against Cussler; thus the suit was not filed within the statute of limitations. Cussler dropped his suit a year later, after the judge agreed that Spence could introduce evidence in support of his discovery claims as a truth defense against Cussler's claims against him.

Hunley may be viewed during tours at the Warren Lasch Conservation Center in Charleston. A replica is on display at the USS Alabama Battleship Memorial Park, Mobile, Alabama, alongside the USS Alabama (BB-60) and the USS Drum (SS-228).

== Crew ==
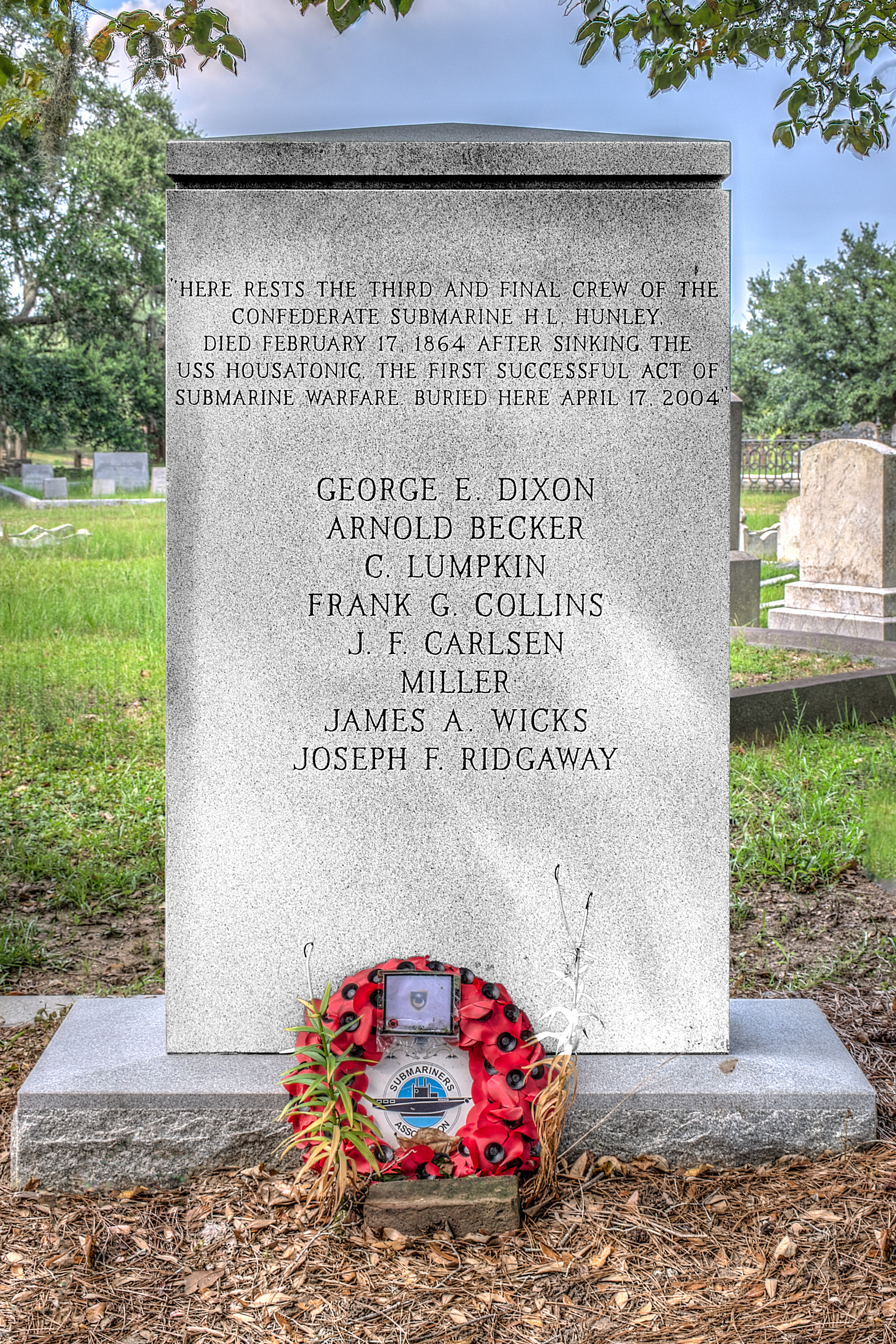
H. L. Hunley memorial marker at Magnolia Cemetery

The crew was composed of:

- Lieutenant George E. Dixon (Commander)(of Alabama or Ohio)
- Frank Collins (of Virginia)
- Joseph F. Ridgaway (of Maryland)
- James A. Wicks (North Carolina native living in Florida)
- Arnold Becker (of Germany)
- Corporal Johan Frederik Carlsen (of Denmark)
- C. Lumpkin (probably of the British Isles)
- Augustus Miller (probably a former member of the German Artillery).

Apart from the submarine commander, Lieutenant George E. Dixon, the identities of the volunteer crewmen of Hunley had long remained a mystery. Douglas Owsley, a physical anthropologist working for the Smithsonian Institution's National Museum of Natural History, examined the remains and determined that four of the men were American born, while the four others were of European birth, based on the chemical signatures left on the men's teeth and bones by the predominant components of their diet. Four men had eaten plenty of corn, an American diet, while the remainder ate mostly wheat and rye, a mainly European diet. By examining Civil War records and conducting DNA testing with possible relatives, forensic genealogist Linda Abrams identified the remains of Dixon and the three other Americans: Frank G. Collins of Fredericksburg, Va., Joseph Ridgaway, and James A. Wicks. Identifying the European crewmen has been more problematic, but was apparently solved in late 2004. The position of the remains indicated that the men died at their stations and were not trying to escape from the sinking submarine.

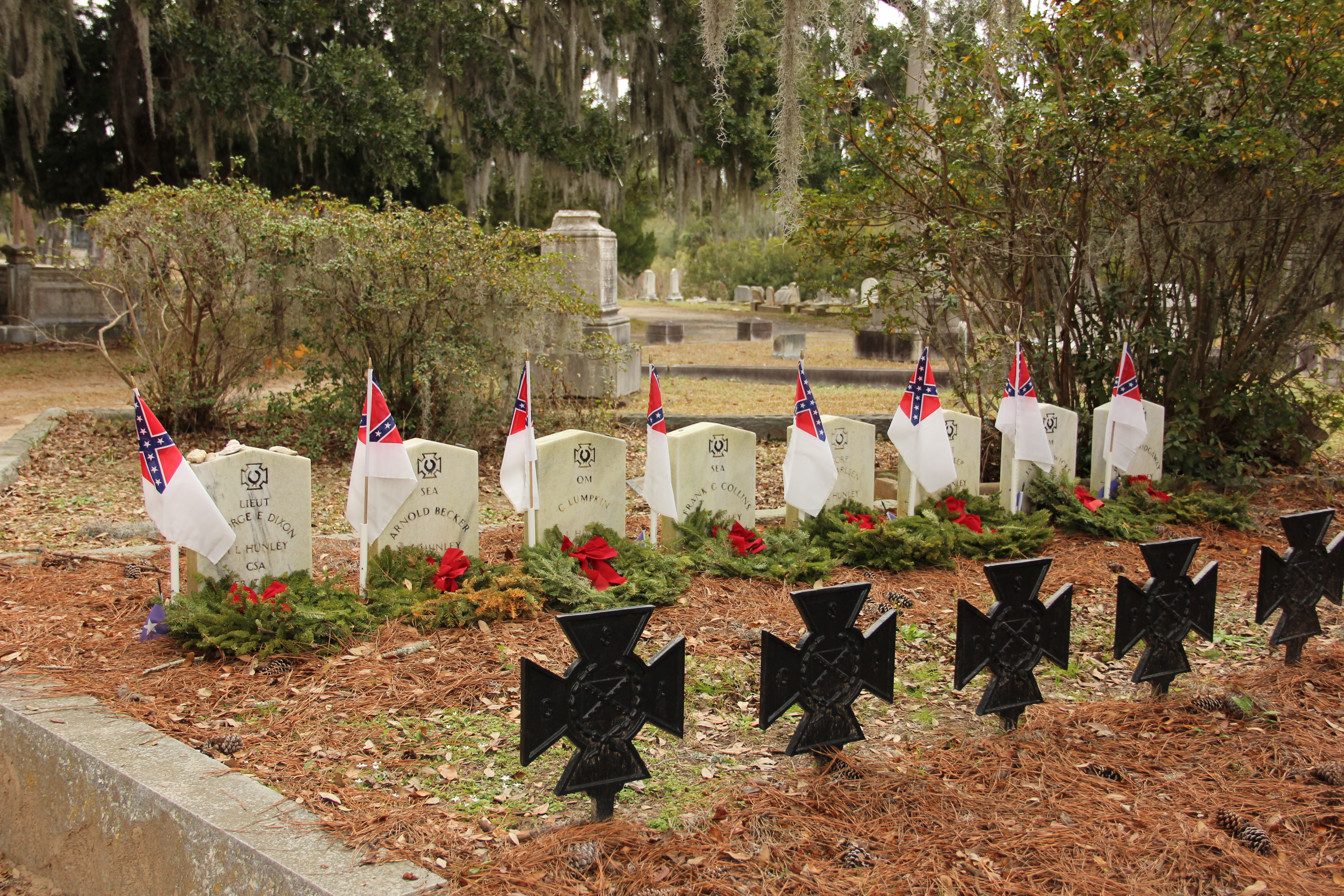
Gravestones of third and final crew of the H. L. Hunley in Magnolia Cemetery in Charleston, South Carolina

On 17 April 2004, the remains of the crew were laid to rest at Magnolia Cemetery, in Charleston. Tens of thousands of people attended including some 6,000 reenactors and 4,000 civilians wearing period clothing. Color guards from all five branches of the U.S. armed forces—wearing modern uniforms—were also in the procession. Even though only two of the crew were from the Confederate States, all were buried with full Confederate honors, including being buried with the 2nd Confederate national flag, known as the Stainless Banner.

Another surprise occurred in 2002, when lead researcher Maria Jacobsen, examining the area close to Lieutenant Dixon, found a misshapen $20 gold piece, minted in 1860, with the inscription "Shiloh April 6, 1862, My life Preserver G. E. D." on a sanded-smooth area of the coin's reverse side, and a forensic anthropologist found a healed injury to Lt. Dixon's hip bone. The findings matched a family legend that Dixon's sweetheart, Queenie Bennett, had given him the coin to protect him. However, the supposed relationship between Bennett and Dixon has not been supported by archaeological investigations of the legend. Dixon had the coin with him at the Battle of Shiloh, where he was wounded in the thigh on 6 April 1862. The bullet struck the coin in his pocket, saving his leg and possibly his life. He had the gold coin engraved and carried it as a lucky charm.

Adam Jon Kronegh of the Danish National Archive identified the J.F. Carlsen of Hunley. Johan Frederik Carlsen was born in Ærøskøbing 9 April 1841. The last year he was registered in the census of Ærøskøbing was 1860, when he was registered as a "sailor". His father was registered as a cobbler, and the teeth of Carlsen's remains in Hunley still bear significant marks of a so-called "tailor's notch", probably from helping his father with needle and thread from childhood. In 1861, J.F. Carlsen entered the freight ship Grethe of Dragør. The ship landed in Charleston in February 1861, where records in the Danish military archives show that Carlsen deserted the ship. In June 1861, he entered Jefferson Davis (the Confederate privateer brig originally named Putnam) as a mate.

== Tours ==
The Hunley is on display at the Warren Lasch Conservation Center. The center includes artifacts recovered from inside Hunley and exhibits about the submarine.

== In popular culture ==
- Hunley's story was the subject of the first episode (entitled "The Hunley") of the TV series The Great Adventure. It aired on 27 September 1963 on CBS. The role of Lt. Dixon (misspelled in the credits as "Lt. Dickson") was played by Jackie Cooper.
- The original TNT Network made-for-cable movie The Hunley (1999) tells the story of H. L. Hunley's final mission while on station in Charleston. It stars Armand Assante as Lt. Dixon, and Donald Sutherland as General Beauregard, Dixon's direct superior on the Hunley project.
- Hunley is the inspiration of the Sons of Confederate Veterans, H. L. Hunley JROTC Award, presented to cadets based on strong corps values, honor, courage, and commitment to their unit during the school year.
- In the novel The Stingray Shuffle by Tim Dorsey, a minor drug cartel decides to emulate the larger cartels' narco-submarine cocaine trafficking by building a replica of Hunley using blueprints downloaded off the Internet.
- The story of the Duke University experiments that concluded the Hunley crew died of pulmonary blast trauma became the subject of the non-fiction book In the Waves: My Quest to Solve the Mystery of a Civil War Submarine by Rachel Lance (2020).

== See also ==
- The Hunley - A 1999 American historical drama television film
- USS Alligator (1862) – U. S. Navy submarine launched a year before Hunley
- American Turtle – built in 1775, the world's first submersible with a documented record of use in combat
- French submarine Plongeur – launched a few months before Hunley
- Spanish submarine Peral – 1888 submarine, the first to be powered by electric batteries
