= Conservation-restoration of the H.L. Hunley =

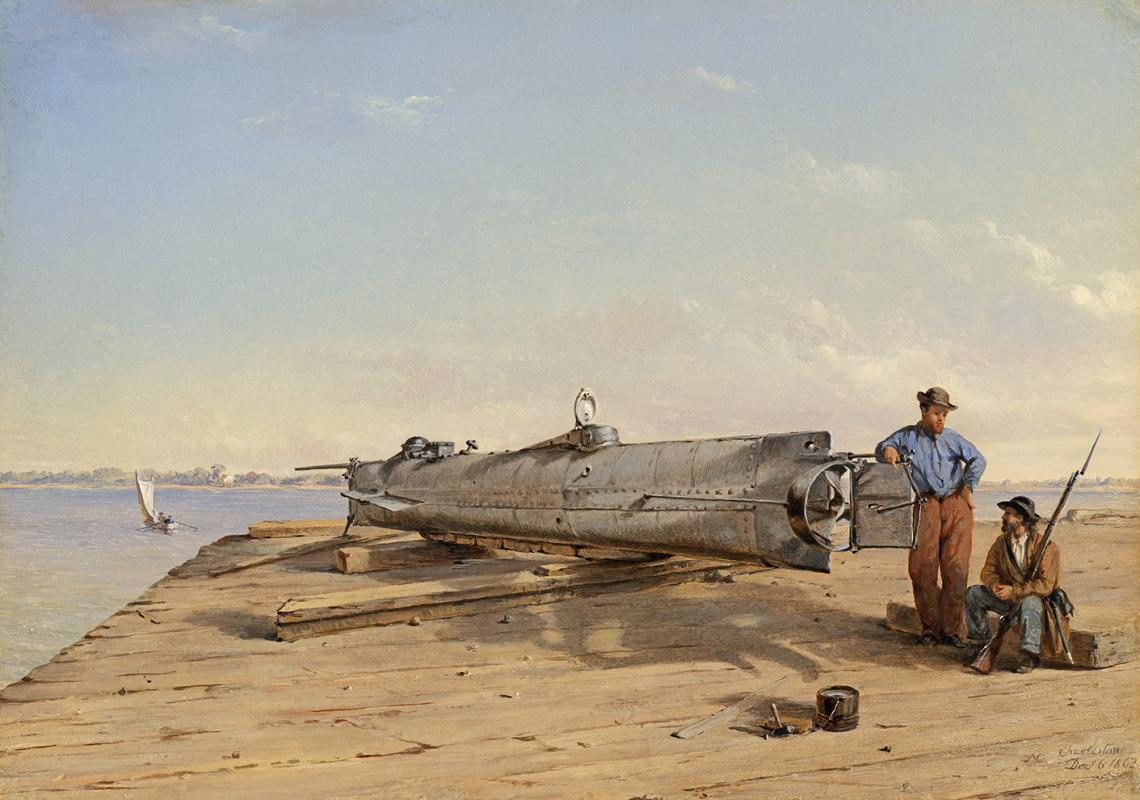
Conrad Wise Chapman – Submarine Torpedo Boat H.L. Hunley, Dec. 6, 1863

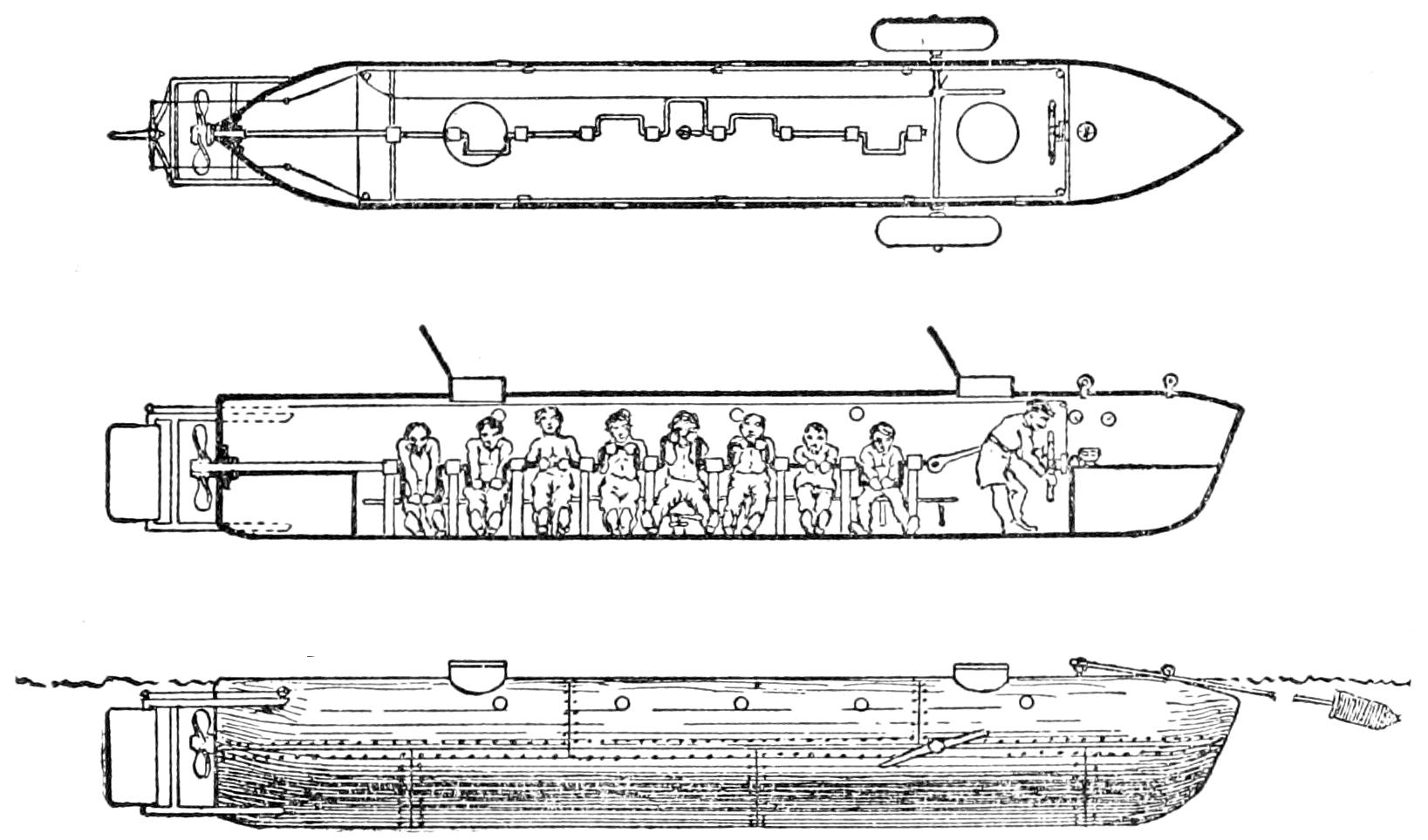
PSM V58 D167 Confederate submarine which sank the Housatonic

The conservation-restoration of the H.L. Hunley is currently being undertaken by the Warren Lasch Conservation Center; they hoped to have the Hunley project completed by 2020. Since the Hunley was located in 1970 by Dr. E. Lee Spence and recovered from the ocean in 2000, a team of conservators from the Lasch Conservation Center has been working to restore the Hunley.

The Hunley, the first combat submarine to successfully complete its mission, has been at the Lasch Conservation Center for over 15 years while scientists and conservators formulate a plan for its restoration. Once the Hunley's conservation and restoration is complete it will be relocated to a new museum built in its honor on the former Navy base in North Charleston. Currently visitors can tour the conservation center laboratories and can view the Hunley in its 75,000-gallon tank.

== History and sinking of the H.L. Hunley ==
H.L. Hunley is a civil war confederate submarine built in 1863 by Park & Lyons; Hunley, McClintock & Weston. Its length is 39.5 ft. and its beam is 3.83 ft. and it had a speed of four knots. It was propelled by a hand cranked propeller and held a crew of one officer and seven enlisted men. Its armament carried one spar torpedo. The Hunley sank three times during its short career. The first two times were during test runs, and the final time was during its attack of the USS Housatonic (1861). The Hunley was lost to the Charleston outer harbor until 1970 and was finally recovered in 2000.

On February 17, 1864, the Hunley destroyed the Union sloop Housatonic outside Charleston Harbor using a spar-mounted torpedo loaded with 135 pounds of gunpowder. The Hunley rammed the Housatonic to embed the torpedo in her hull and then reversed course while the lanyard connected to the torpedo fuse tightened and detonated it. The Housatonic sank immediately. The Hunley was unable to get enough distance and was also fatally damaged, though it may have survived up to an hour after the detonation.

== Discovery and recovery of the H.L. Hunley ==
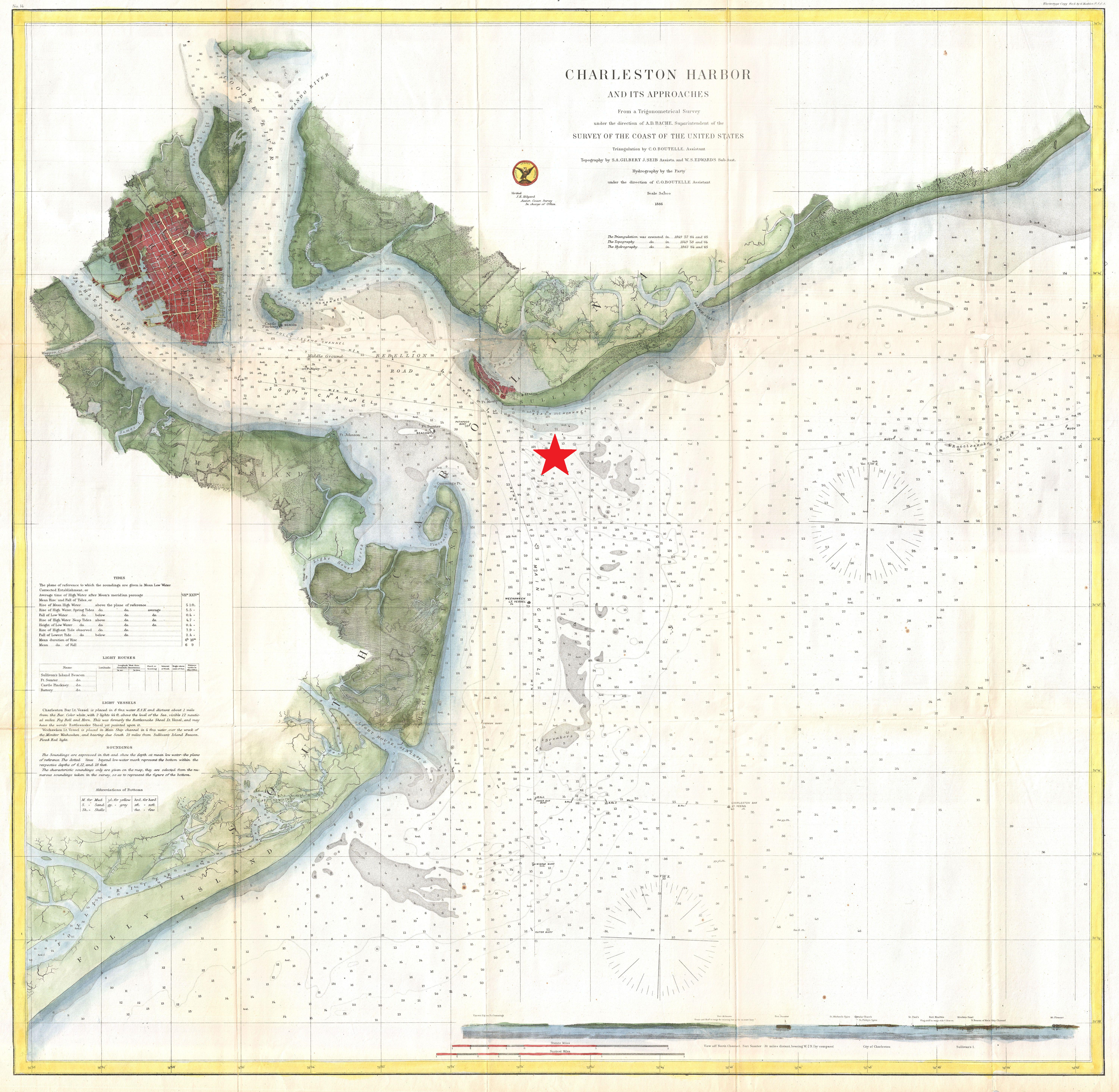
Location of the Hunley submarine

The H.L. Hunley was found in 1995 in the Charleston outer harbor about four miles off Sullivan's island. The divers had to dive down 30 feet of water before finding the Hunley, which was buried in the sand and sediment. There is some controversy about who located the actual position of the Hunley. Well-known author Clive Cussler and underwater archaeologist E. Lee Spence both claim to have made the original discovery. Cussler claims to have discovered it in 1995, and Spence says he discovered it in 1970 but failed to validate the discovery by diving in the location.

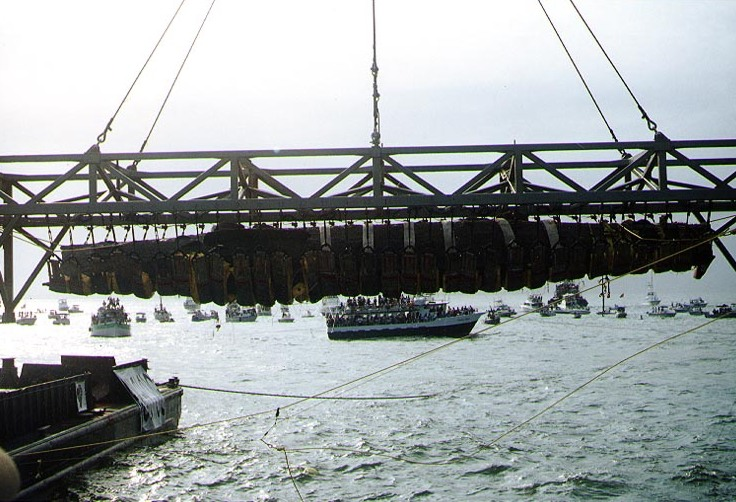
H.L. Hunley recovery

The Hunley was sent to Lasch Conservation Center at the old Charleston Navy Yard for conservation. The remains of the eight crewmen serving on the Hunley when it sank were found and buried on April 17, 2004, at the Magnolia Cemetery in Charleston. The recovery and conservation of the H.L. Hunley was championed by South Carolina Senator Glenn McConnell. He asked Warren Lasch to take on the fundraising and oversee the conservation and restoration treatment of the Hunley. Lasch accepted the challenge in 1997 and became the chairman of the Friends of the Hunley.

== Types of deterioration present on the H.L. Hunley ==
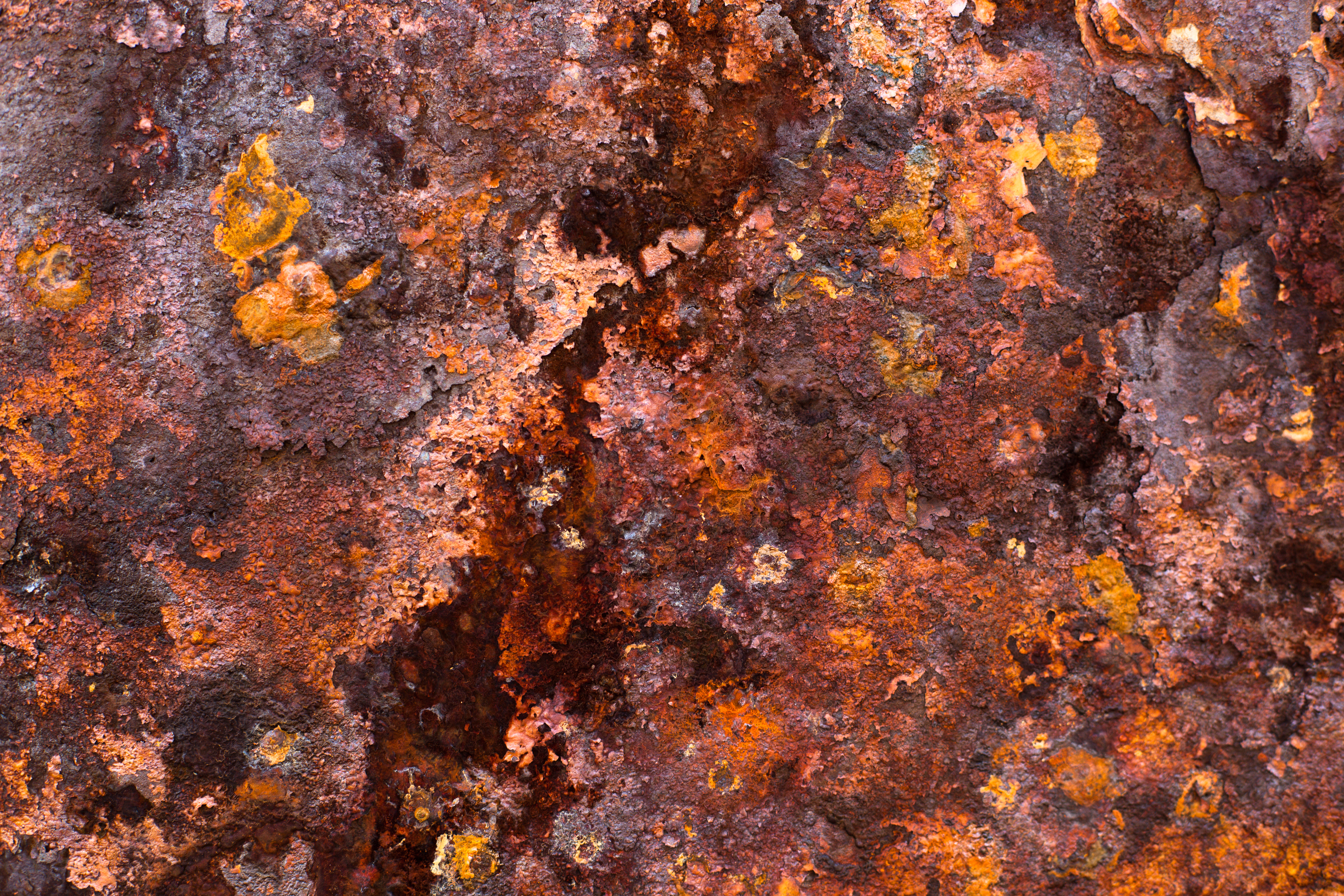
Rust on iron

=== Rust ===
Rust occurs naturally when iron or steel is submerged in water and exposed to oxygen. It can also occur when the moisture content of the air surrounding the metal is high. Because the H.L. Hunley was made of iron and was submerged for over a hundred years, rust had formed all over the submarine. However, to prevent more rust from forming, the conservators choose to keep the H.L. Hunley submerged in a water tank, instead of exposing it to the oxygen-rich air, until a full conservation plan could be created.

=== Metal Fatigue ===
Metal Fatigue (Stress and Corrosion) can be either from stress or corrosion. Stress fatigue occurs when the metal is repeatedly pushed back and forth, such as from water pressure. This pressure eventually cause tiny cracks to form in the metal. Corrosion fatigue happens when the cracks in the metal becomes corrosive and weaken the structure. Thus normal wear and tear can cause metal fatigue.

=== Causes of deterioration ===
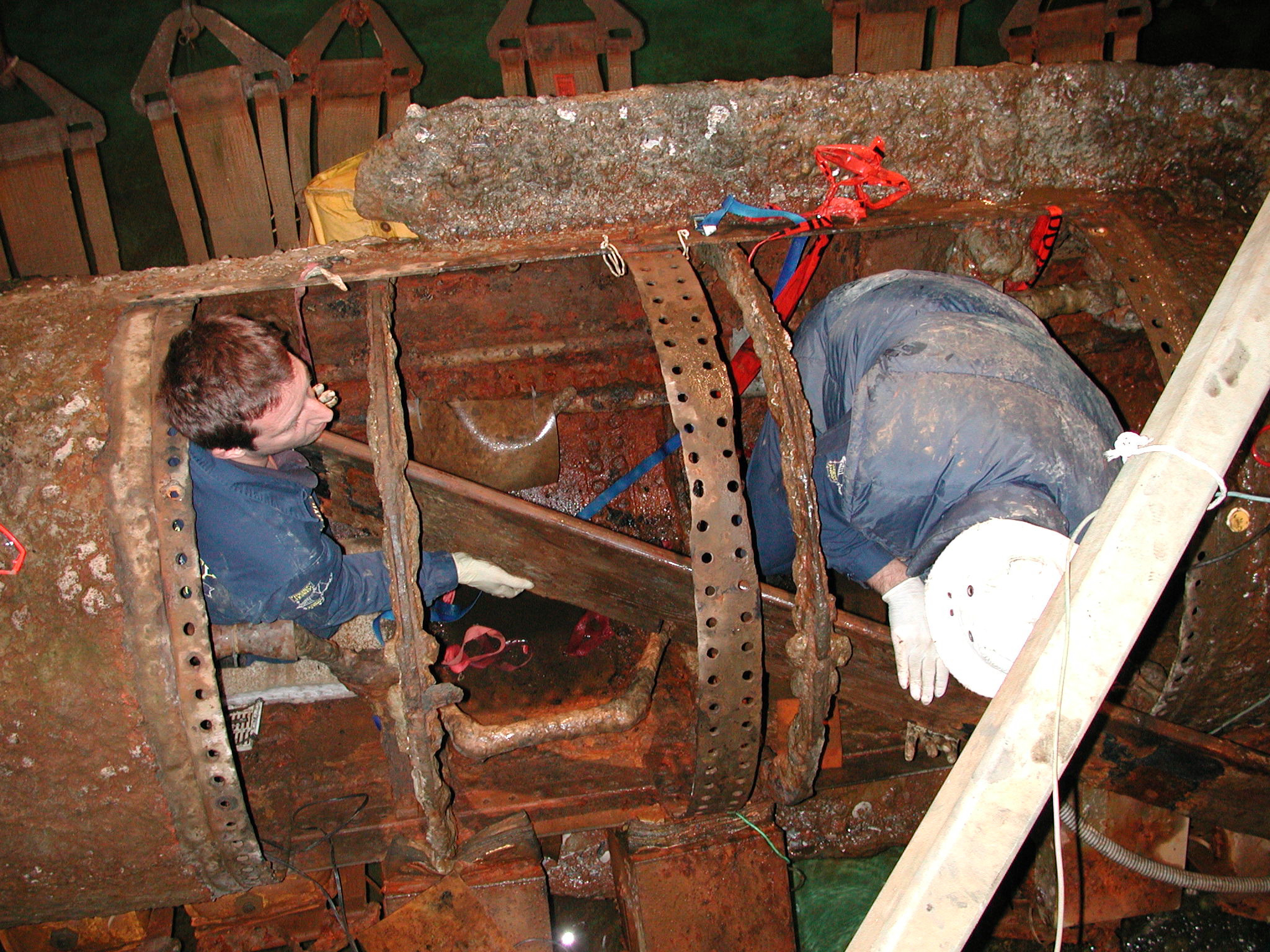
Hunley

==== Salt Water ====
The combination of salt water and metal can cause several types of corrosion, electrochemical corrosion and anaerobic corrosion. Electrochemical corrosion happens because the metal ions attract other compounds, which then cause the salt in the water to attack the metal. Anaerobic corrosion occurs when sulfate deposits surround the submerged metal and start producing hydrogen sulfide, which corrodes metal. Since the H.L. Hunley sank in the outer harbor of Charleston, the salt water had over a hundred years to eat through the metal.

==== Air/oxygen ====
Iron artifacts from the sea in particular are susceptible to rapid deterioration when exposed to an oxygen-rich environment like air. Chlorides from the seawater penetrate the iron on the molecular level. When in solution, these chlorides present no real problem. However, when exposed to air, they slowly dry in crystal form. As the crystals grow, the surface of the metal will expand and flake away, eventually reducing the artifact to a pile of iron oxide dust. In other words, the iron oxide dust is called rust. Rust occurs naturally on iron when it has been submerged for a while and is exposed to oxygen.

==== Concretion ====
Concretion is an encrusted layer of sand, sediment and shells that builds up slowly, when an object is submerged in water. Over time, marine organisms colonize on the submerged metal and build up layers of calcium. These layers create a barrier for a micro environment on the surface of the metal.

== Treatments of deterioration ==
=== Timeline of conservation and restoration ===
- August 2000: Hunley raised from the sea
- February 2001: Several hull plates are removed
- March 2001: First artifacts are found
- April 2001: First human remains are uncovered
- September 2001: Second Phase of conservation and restoration begins
- January 2002: Third Phase begins, studies on the human remains and excavation of the block lifts
- 2003: Fourth Phase begins, excavation of the ballast tanks
- 2008: 3-D scanning of the exterior surface
- June 2011: Hunley is rotated to an upright position
- May 2014: Hunley is lowered into the 75,000 gallon tank, designed to remove the salt from the metal
- 2014-2015: Removal of the outer concretion
- 2016: Removal of the interior concretion

=== Rotation ===
The Hunley was removed from its watery grave at a 45-degree angle in order to keep the interior contents from shifting and falling through a weakened section of the hull. The Hunley had been lying at 45-degree angle on the sea floor for more than a hundred years. To lift the civil war submarine from the ocean, several slings were attached to the underside of the submarine and then slowly lifted from the water.

Once the submarine was relocated to the Lasch Conservation Center, it was left in the slings at a 45-degree angle until the hull plates and keel blocks were removed, eleven tons of sediment had been cleaned out of the interior and an engineering and strength evaluation could be completed. Once the evaluation was completed and the Hunley was deemed safe to move, it took three days in June of 2011 to turn the civil war submarine upright. The conservators also used sensors, located on the keel support, to monitor the weight on each bearing. This was done so that the conservators can make sure the weight of the submarine is being supported evenly.

=== Concretion removal ===
When the Hunley was brought to the Lasch Conservation Center, it had over 1,200 pounds (540 kg) of concretion on its outer hull, in some places on the hull the concretion was over one inch (25 mm) thick. To remove the concretion, conservators spent many hours slowly chiseling the concretion off, using pneumatic chisels. It took conservators over a year to remove all the concretion from the outer hull. As of September 2015, the conservators finished removing the concretion from the outside and began working on the interior. It is stated that it will take at least another year to remove the interior concretion, posssibly even longer, as the conservators have to work in the small interior space of the submarine. Removing the concretion that has built up allows researchers to analyze why the Hunley sank and if the holes they have found in the outer hull of the submarine were from the attack on the Housatonic.

=== Submersion ===
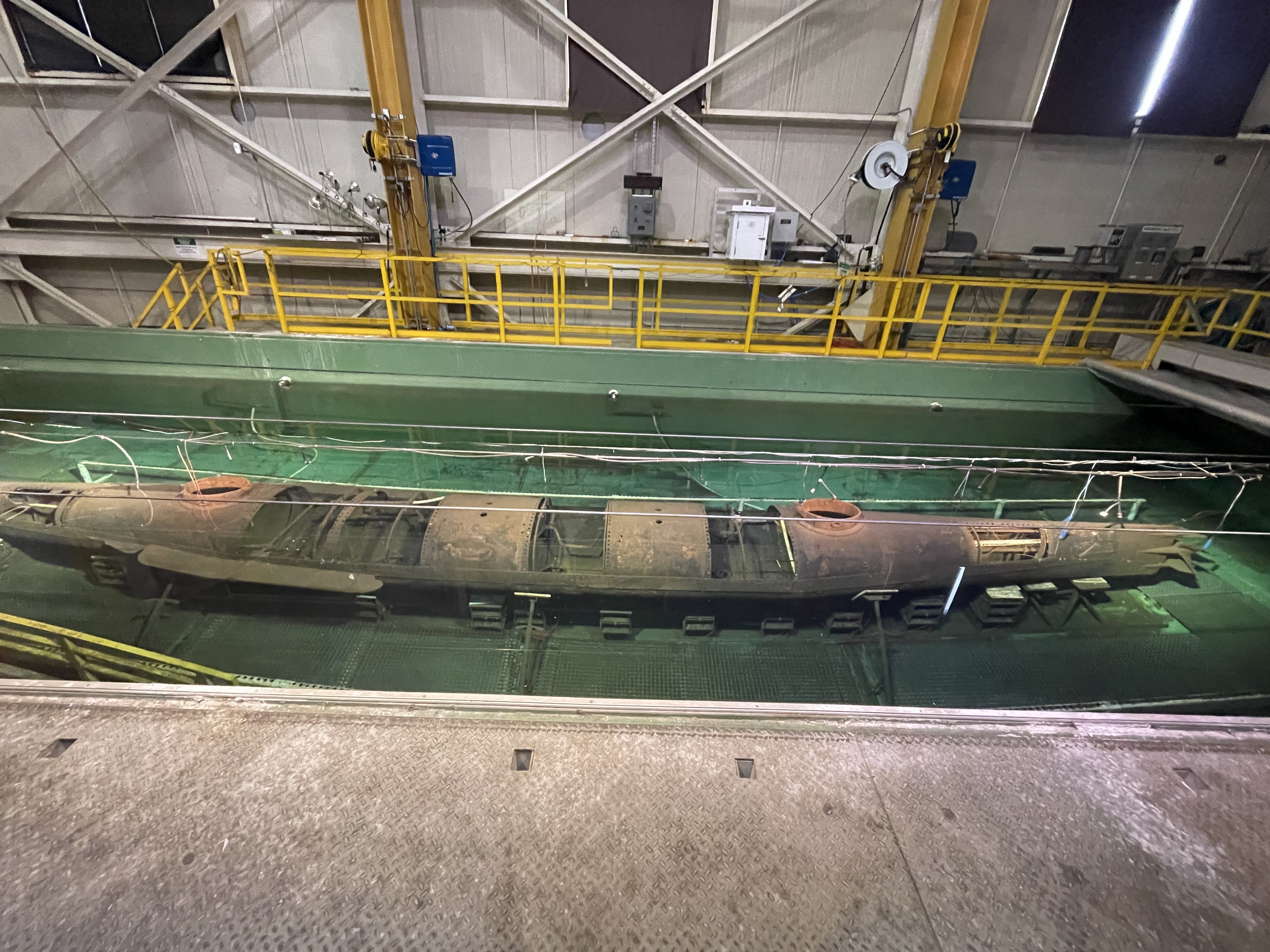
H.L. Hunley in sodium hydroxide bath, August 2025

After the Hunley was recovered it was placed in a 75,000-US-gallon (280,000 L; 62,000 imp gal) tank, consisting of water and a solution of sodium hydroxide. This was to protect the Hunley from the deterioration properties of oxygen. If it was left out in the open air, it would immediately begin to rust and deteriorate rapidly. By placing the Hunley in the tank, conservators had bought some time to formulate a conservation plan. "During treatment, the Hunley will be constantly monitored and once the chemical bath is saturated with the salts it has leached from the submarine, it will be drained from the tank, neutralized, and replaced with a fresh solution. This process, which is estimated to take approximately 5-7 years, will be repeated until the level of salt in the iron is low enough to allow the Hunley to be rescued from its delicate and dangerous state."
