= Blue light (pyrotechnic signal) =

Early pyrotechnic signal

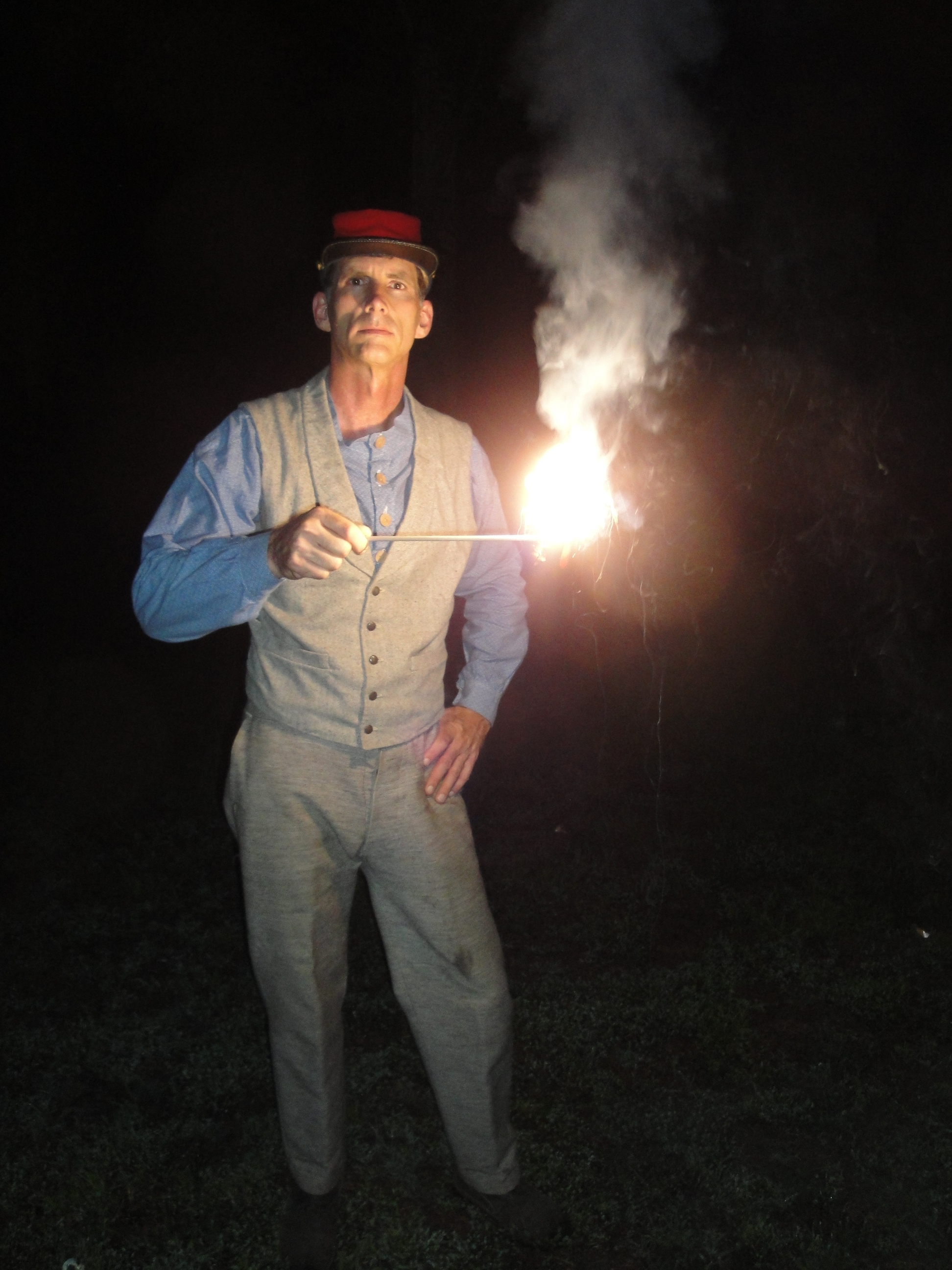
Blue light.

Blue light is an archaic signal, the progenitor of modern pyrotechnic flares. Blue light consists of a loose, chemical composition burned in an open, hand-held hemispherical wooden cup, and so is more akin to the flashpan signals of the Admiral Nelson era than the modern, encased signal flares, which are often launched by mortar or rifle and suspended by parachute. Widely used during the eighteenth and nineteenth centuries for signaling by the world's military forces, and for general illumination in the civilian sector, blue light was remarkable for its use of poisonous arsenic compounds (realgar and orpiment), which contributed to its replacement by safer flares in the early twentieth century.

== Confusion with blue-colored lanterns ==
Blue light was famously mentioned in accounts of the H.L. Hunley, the Confederate submarine which became the first to sink an enemy vessel, the USS Housatonic, on February 17, 1864, during the Civil War. Such blue light has been repeatedly misidentified by authors and researchers of the Hunley story as a blue lantern, since they failed to realize the 1864 meaning of "blue light" as it was known to eyewitnesses who testified to its use during the battle between the Hunley and Housatonic. Pyrotechnic blue light was commonly used by the vessels of the Federal South Atlantic Blockading Squadron off of Charleston, South Carolina and would have been a familiar sight to both Union and Confederate soldiers and sailors.

Recipes for blue light appear in early chemistry texts and often included antimony or copper compounds meant to add a blue color, but by the time of the American Civil War, standard military texts listed recipes for blue light which lacked any such coloring agent. While the generic moniker "blue light" was retained, the pyrotechnic signal was meant to burn with a vivid, white light. Modern authors have been confused by the generic name of blue light, and have imagined incorrectly that the signal which was seen during the Hunley - Housatonic encounter was blue. The oil lantern which archeologists at the Warren Lasch Conservation Center recovered from the Hunley submarine has a clear, not a blue, glass lens, further evidence which discounts the modern "blue lantern myth" of the Hunley. Blue light as made in 1864 has been reproduced according to the two recipes listed in period texts and has been tested with success over the same distances involved in the Hunley engagement.

== Decline ==
Blue light has been obsolete for signaling since early in the twentieth century, but pyrotechnic lighting is still popular for celebratory fireworks displays, and its synonyms "Bengal light" and "Bengal fire" can still be found in modern pyrotechnic manuals. Such displays were also popular in nineteenth century civilian life: two hundred blue lights were used in the first illumination of Niagara Falls during the 1860 North American visit of the Prince of Wales.

== As a nickname ==
"Blue Light" was a derisive nickname given to military officers of the 18th and 19th centuries, whose evangelical Christian zeal burned as brightly as its namesake signal, to the chagrin of those less ardent. During the American Civil War, Confederate General Stonewall Jackson carried the nickname "Old Blue Light" because his men said his eyes glowed with a blue light when battle commenced. Shelby Foote, The Civil War; the nickname is referenced in the lyrics of "Stonewall Jackson's Way" (penned circa 1862).
