= Rachel Lance =

American biomedical engineer and writer

Rachel Lance is an American biomedical engineer and writer. Her scientific work focuses on the physiological effects that extreme environments have on people, most often undersea and in the face of explosives. From 2009 to 2017 Lance worked as a civil servant for the US Navy, where she designed equipment for underwater operations, and until 2024 she worked as faculty as an Assistant Consulting Professor in the Department of Anesthesiology at Duke University. Lance earned her Bachelor of Science (2005) and Master of Science (2007) in biomedical engineering at the University of Michigan. Concurrent with her work for the US Navy, she earned her Ph.D. in Biomedical Engineering at Duke in 2016 with a dissertation titled Underwater Blast Injuries, and the Sinking of the Submarine HL Hunley. She is the author of two mainstream books, In the Waves: My Quest to Solve the Mystery of a Civil War Submarine and Chamber Divers: The Untold Story of the D-Day Scientists Who Changed Special Operations Forever.

== HL Hunley Controversy ==
The HL Hunley was a homemade, hand-cranked submarine built by Confederate personnel during the American Civil War. It disappeared after setting off a 200-pound black powder bomb against the hull of the Union ship USS Housatonic on February 17, 1864, and it was recovered from the ocean floor outside Charleston, South Carolina in the year 2000.

Lance, along with a team of other relevant experts, published a series of three peer-reviewed academic papers about the submarine and its explosion as part of a scientific assessment of the various trauma risks to the crew. The first paper evaluated the air supply inside the submarine's enclosed hull, and concluded that the crew of eight men would have noticed painful symptoms from carbon dioxide with enough time to save themselves before they risked loss of consciousness from lack of oxygen. It therefore eliminated asphyxiation as the cause of the crew's demise. The second paper evaluated the so-called "lucky shot" theory, which stated that a crewmember from the deck of the USS Housatonic managed to shoot the pilot of the Hunley, causing the sub to sink and kill the remaining crew. Lance and her co-authors conducted ballistic testing with period-accurate weapons as well as an analysis of the tides and probable sinking rate of the submarine, and found that this theory did not match the location the submarine was found in, the damage to the submarine, or the absence of bullets or bullet wounds to the crew.

Lance defended her dissertation on blast trauma in November 2016 and returned to work full-time with the US Navy before publishing the final academic paper in the series, which released on August 23, 2017 to reveal the results from Lance's experiments using live explosives and a scale model of the submarine. She concluded that the beer-keg-sized bomb, located only 16 feet from the crew compartment, was the likely cause of the death of the crew.

After the release of this paper and news reports about the findings, the pro-Lost Cause group Friends of the Hunley embarked on a smear campaign against Lance. Among other acts, they issued a mass email attempting to marginalize the scientific work, saying "Duke University issued a press release claiming one of their student's [sic] discovered what caused the Hunley's crew to perish," a statement that was misleading at best given Lance wrote the peer-reviewed paper after receiving her doctorate. The Friends of the Hunley continued to attempt to marginalize the scientific work as a student project and encouraged others to do so as well. Podcast hosts from the podcast Stuff You Missed In History Class, upon receiving such emails after airing an episode about the HL Hunley in which Lance did not appear or participate, called the group's claims tantamount to saying "nuh uh" without support, and pointed out the sexism inherent to their methods of marginalizing Lance. The Friends also attempted to discredit Lance's work by comparing it to results from a separate, entirely different theory of the crew's demise that stated they hit their heads on the hull of the submarine when it moved as a result of the blast. Representatives tried to get a scheduled lecture by Lance at the US National Archives canceled, and when the Archives refused to cancel the lecture, several instead attended and attacked her during the questions session, with Lance replying that she found it "inappropriate" that they continued to pretend they could not understand that there is a difference between being hit in the head and experiencing a pressure wave from a bomb.

In her book about the subject, In the Waves: My Quest to Solve the Mystery of a Civil War Submarine, Lance revealed that the Friends of the Hunley had engaged in other acts of historical revisionism to control the narrative about the Confederate submarine in support of the racist "Lost Cause" agenda. She found evidence that the removal of the Confederate flag about the South Carolina statehouse in 2000 was a direct trade for granting total control over the display of the HL Hunley to a South Carolina group led by active members of the Sons of Confederate Veterans. Lance also revealed that the Friends of the Hunley had made active choices to try to hide racist aspects of the submarine's history, including that they claimed to transcribe a historical document to make it publicly accessible, but changed the wording to hide the fact that two enslaved men had been murdered.

== Personal ==
Rachel Lance lives in Durham, North Carolina. She loves baking, scuba diving, and "properly designed O-ring seals." She holds a blue belt in Brazilian jiujitsu.
