= Horace Lawson Hunley =

American engineer (1823–1863)

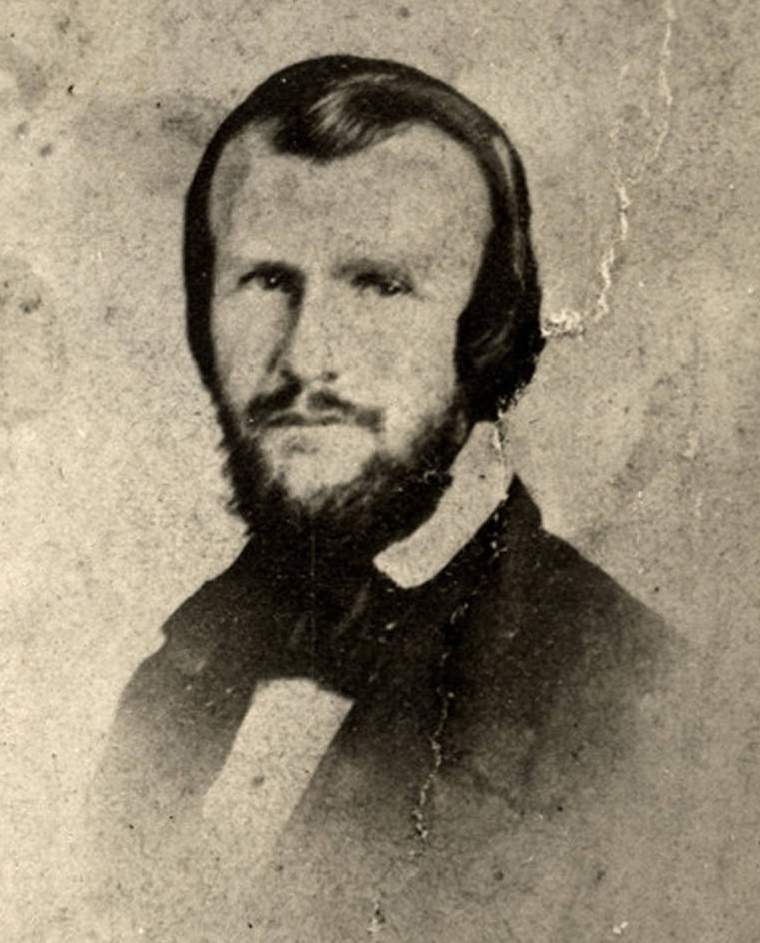
- Hunley in c. 1860
- Born: December 29, 1823; Sumner County, Tennessee, U.S.
- Died: October 15, 1863 (aged 39); Charleston, South Carolina, U.S.
- Burial place: Magnolia Cemetery; Charleston, South Carolina, U.S.
- Education: University of Louisiana
- Military career
- Allegiance: Confederate States of America
- Branch: Confederate States Navy
- Service years: 1861–1863
- Rank: Financier
- Conflicts: American Civil War

Horace Lawson Hunley (December 29, 1823 – October 15, 1863) was a Confederate marine engineer during the American Civil War. He developed early hand-powered submarines, the most famous of which was posthumously named for him, H. L. Hunley.

== Biography ==
Hunley was born in Sumner County, Tennessee, to Louisa Harden Lawson and John Hunley. After relocating to New Orleans, Hunley studied law at the University of Louisiana and was admitted to the bar in 1849. He served in the Louisiana State Legislature and practiced law in New Orleans.

In response to the Union blockade of southern ports, the Confederate government offered bounties of up to $50,000 to anyone who sank a Union warship. In the summer of 1861, the Reverend Franklin Smith advocated Southern businessmen pursue submarine warfare, in writings to Southern newspapers. At this time Hunley joined engineer James R. McClintock and Baxter Watson in building the Pioneer (submarine). In order to prevent her capture, the submarine had to be scuttled during trials in Lake Pontchartrain when New Orleans fell to Union forces in early 1862. The Pioneer would later be raised in 1868 and sold for scrap later that year.

Hunley, with McClintock and Watson, followed by building the American Diver. The second submarine was towed to Fort Morgan and attempted an attack on the Union blockade of Mobile. However, the submarine foundered in foul weather and sank in the mouth of Mobile Bay. without any casualties, as the crew was able to escape.

Hunley organized and arranged funding for a third submarine. The third boat, the H. L. Hunley, was one-third financed by Hunley, one-third by E. C. Singer (an associate of Horace's in the Confederate Secret Service and nephew of Isaac Singer, constructor of the sewing machine), and the remaining third to Singer associates R. W. Dunn and J. D. Breaman. Singer named the third vessel the H. L. Hunley to honor Horace's devotion and efforts to his sub projects. After a demonstration held on July 31, 1863 was successful by sinking an old barge the submarine was transported to Charleston harbor and presented to General P. G. T. Beauregard. Five men from the first crew of the Hunley died during early tests when she was accidentally swamped by the wake of a passing ship through her open hatches; four managed to escape. Another crew was recruited by Hunley who promised Beauregard a timely attempt. This crew included experienced crew members from earlier experiments. On October 15, 1863, Hunley took his turn at command during a routine exercise. The vessel again sank, and this time all eight crew members were killed, including Hunley himself. The vessel was later raised and used again in 1864 in the first successful sinking of an enemy vessel (USS Housatonic) by a submarine in naval history. The operation was also fateful for the H. L. Hunley herself, which sank a third time, and for the second time losing all hands.

Upon recovery of the submarine and associated artifacts, it was discovered that the spar torpedo exploded while still attached to the spar. The system was designed to have the submarine ram the torpedo barb into the hull, back off to a safe distance, then activate the ignition via a long-length of rope. The submarine was never intended to be that close to the explosion and probably suffered significant structural damage, which contributed to her loss.

Horace Lawson Hunley was buried with full military honors at Magnolia Cemetery in Charleston, South Carolina, on November 8, 1863.

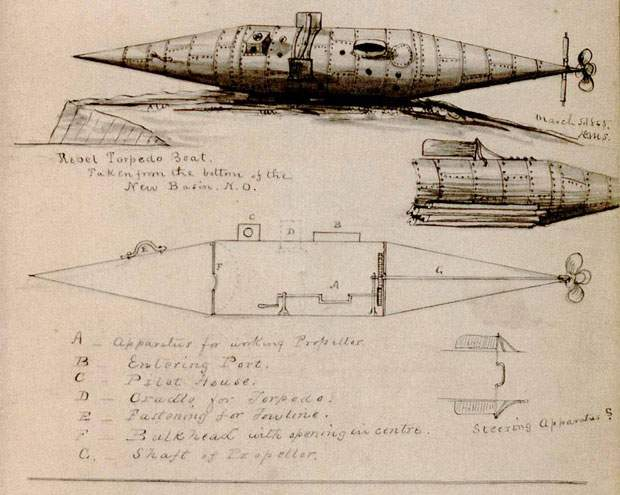
The Confederate submarine Pioneer drawn by Ensign David M. Stauffer of the Mississippi Squadron, 1865

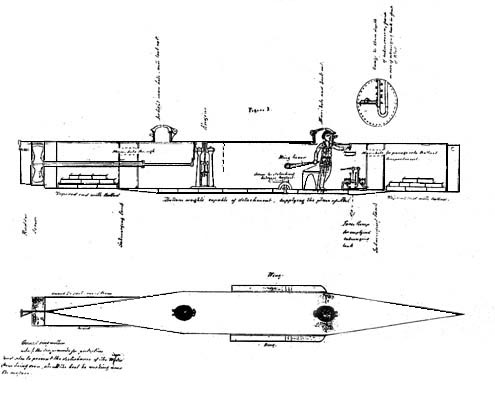
Cross-section of the American Diver. From a sketch drawn by James R. McClintock in 1872.

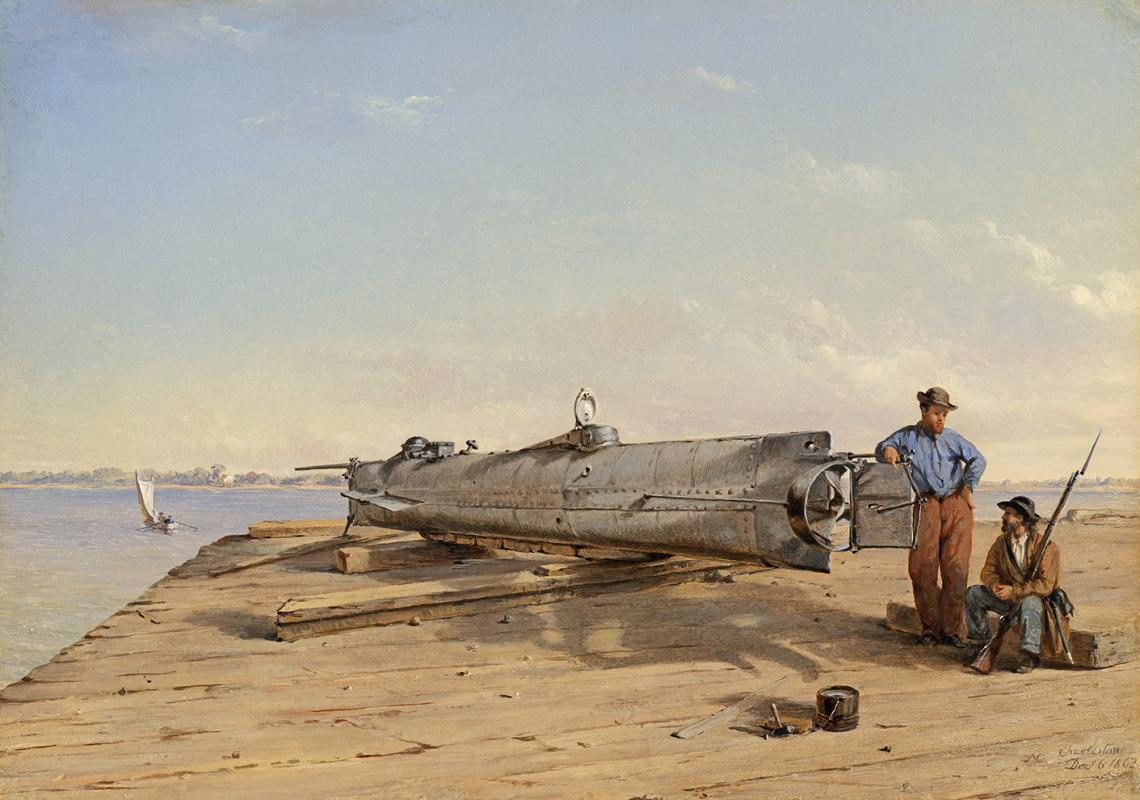
H.L. Hunley by Conrad Wise Chapman 1863
