= Benson–Hammond House =

Historic house in Maryland

- Benson-Hammond House
- U.S. National Register of Historic Places
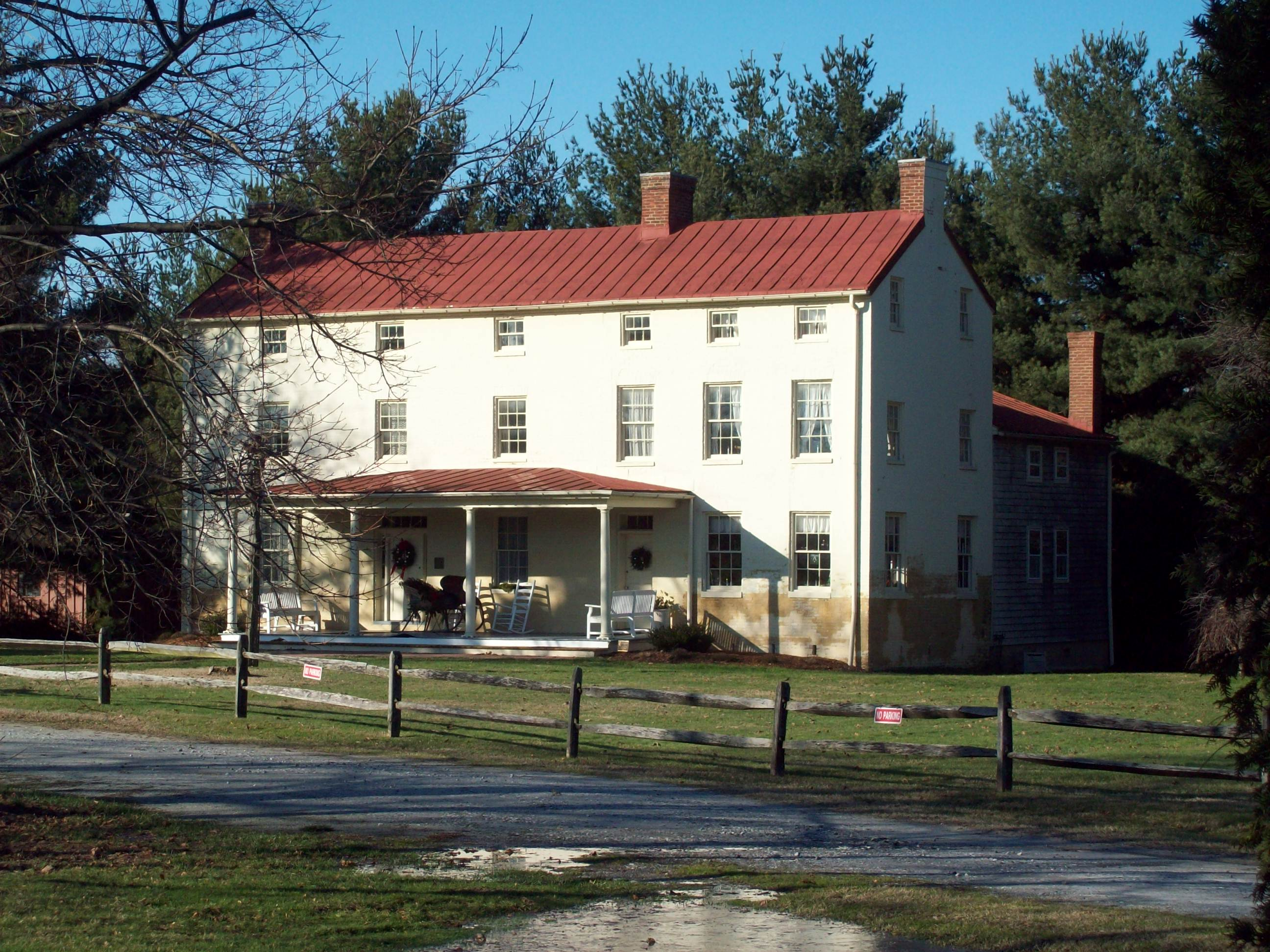
- Benson-Hammond House, December 2009

- Location within Maryland Location within the United States
- Location: Aviation Blvd., Linthicum, Maryland
- Coordinates: 39°11′23″N 76°39′17″W
- Area: 2.6 acres (1.1 ha)
- Built: c. 1820-1870
- Architectural style: Greek Revival
- NRHP reference No.: 90000595
- Added to NRHP: April 5, 1990

The Benson–Hammond House is a historic house located on Aviation Blvd in Linthicum, Anne Arundel County, Maryland.

== Description and history ==
It is a 2 1/2-story, six-by-two-bay brick farmhouse constructed in the Greek Revival style in several stages at various times between about 1820 and 1870.

It was listed on the National Register of Historic Places on April 5, 1990.

On June 18, 2026, The Benson Hammond House was the site of a gathering of next of kin and members of the media for the announcement of the DNA identification of Private John Pumphrey, a Maryland teen killed at the Battle of Camden in 1780.
