= American Diver =

Submarine of the Confederate States of America, predecessor of the H.L. Hunley submarine

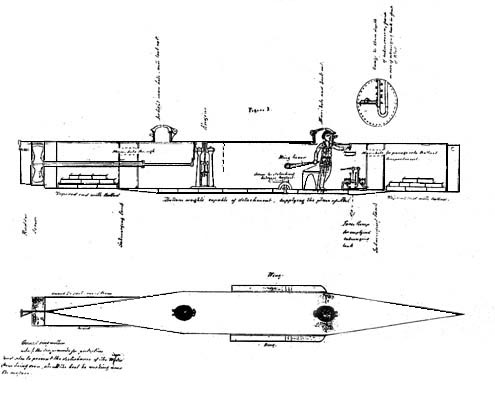
- Cross-section of the American Diver. From a sketch drawn by Jame R. McClintock in 1872.

History

C.S.A.
- Name: American Diver
- Builder: Horace L. Hunley
- Laid down: 1862
- Launched: January 1863
- Out of service: February 1863
- Fate: Lost

General characteristics
- Length: 36 ft (11 m)
- Beam: 3 ft (0.91 m)
- Propulsion: Hand-cranked propeller
- Complement: 5 crew

American Diver, also known as the Pioneer II, was a prototype submarine built for the Confederate States of America military. It was the first successor to the Pioneer. The Diver was invented and built by the same consortium that built the Pioneer in New Orleans. It was composed of Horace Lawson Hunley, James McClintock, and Baxter Watson. They were forced to move their operations to Mobile, Alabama, following the capture of New Orleans by Union forces in April 1862. Although ultimately unsuccessful, it served as a model in the development of the consortium's next submarine, the H. L. Hunley. The Hunley eventually became the first combat submarine to sink an enemy warship.

== History ==
The Diver was designed and built by the consortium in late 1862. Over the course of several months many costly attempts were made to propel the submarine with some type of electrical motor and then a steam engine, but both methods proved to be failures. The steam engine was finally replaced by a hand-crank. The submarine was ready for trials by January 1863. It required four crew members to turn the propeller crank and one to steer and was deemed to be too slow by the team. Nonetheless, it was decided in February 1863, to tow the submarine down the bay to Fort Morgan and attempt an attack on the Union blockade of Mobile. However, the submarine foundered in the heavy chop caused by foul weather and the currents at the mouth of Mobile Bay and sank. The crew escaped, but the boat was not recovered.
