= John Pumphrey =

American Revolutionary War soldier

- Born: Between 1762 and 1764; Anne Arundel County, Province of Maryland
- Died: August 16, 1780; Camden, South Carolina
- Cause of death: Killed in Action
- Burial place: Old Presbyterian Burying Ground at the Quaker Cemetery, Camden, South Carolina
- Military career
- Allegiance: United States
- Service years: 1777 - 1780
- Rank: Private
- Nickname: Camden 9B
- Unit: Maryland 7th Regiment
- Known for: First individual from the Camden Fourteen to be identified using his DNA.

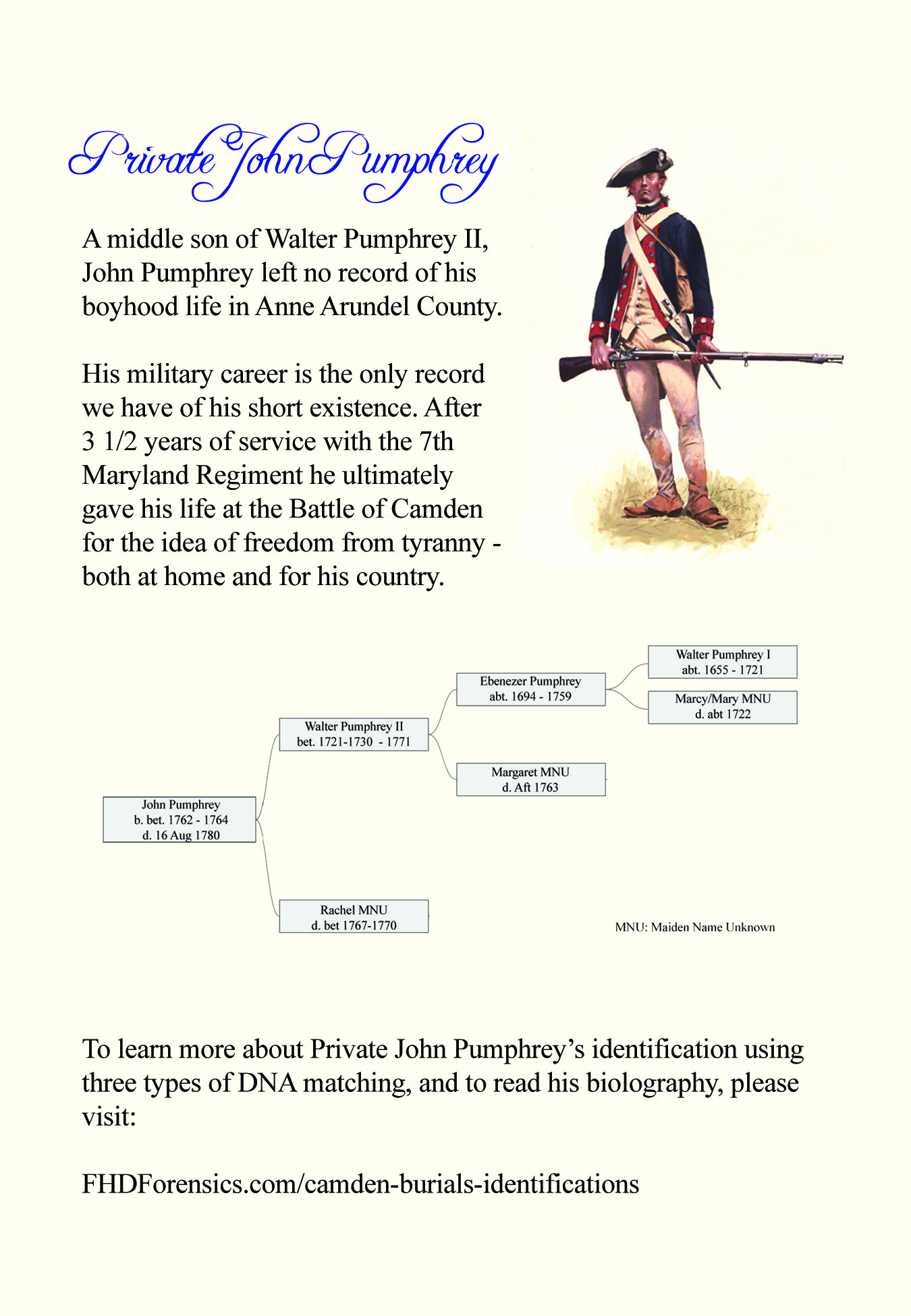
Pedigree card from next of kin notification

Private John Pumphrey (born between 1762 and 1764 – August 16, 1780) was a Continental Army soldier in the 7th Maryland Regiment who was killed at the Battle of Camden during the American Revolutionary War. His remains, designated "Camden 9B" during archaeological investigation of the Camden battlefield, were identified through forensic genetic genealogy in 2026.

Pumphrey was the first of the "Camden Fourteen" recovered by the Camden Burials Project to be identified using genetic genealogy, Pumphrey was labeled as Camden 9B for his discovery as the second subject in mass burial # 9 on the battlefield, along with 4 other Continentals. Following the upload of his genetic profile to genealogy databases commentators described Pumphrey and his compatriots as some of the oldest unidentified individuals ever investigated using forensic genetic genealogy.

Because few documentary records survive for children during the colonial era, researchers relied primarily genetic data, as well as the historical records left by his parents and his siblings after the war to reconstruct his biography.

== Early life ==
An anthropological examination performed on his remains by anthropologists Drs. Madeline Atwell and WIlliam Stevens from the Richland County Coroner's Office (RCCO) in Columbia, South Carolina revealed that he was a subadult, or under the age of 20 when he died. In later scrutiny Atwell determined that he was most likely as young as 16 when he died in 1780, making him 13 years-old when he joined the Continental Army in 1777.

Extensive genetic genealogy research uncovered that John Pumphrey was a direct descendant and great-grandson of Walter Pumphrey I (1655–1721), the colonial-era immigrant founder of the Pumphrey family in Anne Arundel County, Maryland.

John Pumphrey's grandfather, Ebenezer Pumphrey (1694–1759) was Walter I's middle son who became even more prominent than his father in the lumber and building industry in Maryland. John's father was Ebenezer's son, Walter Pumphrey II (about 1721–1771), and his mother was most likely Walter's wife, Rachel who died before 1770.

Orphaned by the time he was about 10 years old, Pumphrey may have enlisted at his unusually young age of 13–15 due to instability at home after his father's death in 1771 according to the researchers involved in his identification. A cousin, Rezin Pumphrey took over administration of Walter Pumphrey II's estate in 1772 and began selling their land and assets. John's brother, Greenberry Pumphrey (About 1752 - Bef. Oct 1815) later spent decades recovering the family's rightful property.

== Military service ==
Pumphrey enlisted with Captain Frederick Deem's 7th Maryland Regiment on January 5, 1777. On February 28, 1779, he took a re-enlistment bonus of $100 to continue serving.

Aside from the Battle of Camden, John Pumphrey and the 7th Maryland participated in Northern Theater engagements before marching south, including the Battle of Brandywine, Battle of Germantown, and the Battle of Monmouth. His regiment was also encamped at Valley Forge with General George Washington during the winter of 1778.

== Discovery ==
Most American Continentals killed at the Battle of Camden on August 16, 1780, were buried where they fell. Many of the battlefield burials were incredibly shallow, with at least one combatant's remains emerging from the ground at the end of the 20th century. During the 1990s, relic hunters came upon what were revealed to be graves while scouring the area for military ephemera.

After the early discoveries by artifact collectors, archaeologists James Legg and Steven D. Smith of the South Carolina Institute of Archaeology and Anthropology worked over nearly three decades protecting, studying, and interpreting the Camden Battlefield. A joint preservation effort between several agencies eventually evolved into what would become the Camden Burials Project. In the fall of 2022, 14 sets of complete skeletal remains were transported from the battlefield to the RCCO for examination and preparation for reburial.

After a funeral on April 22, 2023 with full military honors attended by representatives of both the US and British armies, the twelve combatants determined to be US Continentals were later reburied at the Old Presbyterian Burying Ground at the Quaker Cemetery in Camden, South Carolina.

The DNA identification project for Private John Pumphrey was underwritten by The South Carolina Battleground Preservation Trust, SC Institute of Archaeology and Anthropology's Archaeological Research Trust, Historic Camden Foundation, Genealogy For Justice, and the DNA project's participants and fans. Certain parts of the research were also supported by FamilyTreeDNA.

== Identification ==
After reburial in 2023, his DNA was extracted from small bone samples submitted to Santa Cruz, California paleogenomics lab Astrea Forensics. Identification was made by matching his genetic profile with matches in public databases who had opted into forensic sharing, as well as with YDNA reference testing. Three different kinds of DNA matching were employed.

Texas-based FHD Forensics performed the genetic genealogy investigation and announced the upload of his genetic profile on December 11, 2024. The three types of DNA matching used to determine his identity were autosomal DNA, YDNA, and XDNA.

Autosomal DNA analysis produced approximately 20,000 genetic matches in the GEDmatch and FamilyTreeDNA databases. Researchers then tested certain test subjects' Y-chromosome DNA, which is passed largely unchanged from father to son, to confirm that that Camden 9B belonged to the Pumphrey paternal line previously revealed by the autosomal DNA matches.

To identify his maternal ancestry, X-chromosome DNA matches were traced. Because males inherit their single X chromosome from their mother, while females inherit one X chromosome from each parent, the distinctive inheritance pattern of X-DNA helped identify Pumphrey's mother.

Private Pumphrey's genetic genealogy identification was announced to his closest next of kin at a ceremony at Benson-Hammond House in Linthicum, Maryland near his boyhood home on June 18, 2026.
