= Underwater Archaeology Branch, Naval History & Heritage Command =

Unit of the United States Department of the Navy

Underwater Archaeology Branch
Agency overview
- Formed: 1996
- Headquarters: Washington D.C., United States
- Parent agency: Naval History & Heritage Command
- Website: https://www.history.navy.mil/research/underwater-archaeology.html

The Underwater Archaeology Branch (UAB) of the Naval History & Heritage Command (NHHC) is a unit of the United States Department of the Navy. It was formally founded in 1996 as a consequence of the emerging need to manage, study, conserve, curate and interpret the U.S. Navy's submerged cultural resources.

== Mission ==
Today, the Branch's mission is to manage, research, conserve, and interpret the Navy's collection of sunken and terrestrial military craft, which includes nearly 3,000 shipwrecks and over 17,000 aircraft wrecks distributed across the globe, and which date from the American Revolution to the beginnings of the nuclear age. The Navy's sunken and terrestrial military craft reflect pivotal events in American history, contain environmental or public safety hazards such as oil or unexploded ordnance, and, most importantly, often serve as the final resting places of sailors who paid the ultimate sacrifice in service of the nation. As a consequence, these sites are protected from unauthorized disturbance by the Sunken Military Craft Act.

== Duties and responsibilities ==
The Underwater Archaeology Branch serves four primary functions:

1) HISTORIC PRESERVATION & RESOURCE MANAGEMENT

The Branch ensures that the Department of the Navy remains in compliance with applicable federal laws and regulations pertaining to activities directed at the Navy’s over 20,000 sunken military craft, including the administration of the Department’s archaeological, historical, and educational permitting program implementing the Sunken Military Craft Act. The Branch also serves as the technical authority for the Department of the Navy on matters pertaining to submerged cultural resources and the science of underwater archaeology.

2) ARCHAEOLOGICAL RESEARCH

The Branch executes a scientific field research program based on organic, partner, and permittee capabilities that addresses archaeological research priorities, supports resource management objectives, contributes to our knowledge of U.S. Navy history, and enhances broader commemorative efforts and initiatives.

3) CONSERVATION & CURATION

Through its Conservation, Research, and Archaeology Laboratory (CO.R.A.L), the Branch stabilizes, analyzes, interprets, and manages a collection of more than 30,000 archaeological artifacts recovered from Department of the Navy sunken military craft. It maintains specialized artifact analysis and conservation expertise, a dedicated laboratory and curatorial facility, and an active artifact loan program.

4) PUBLIC OUTREACH

Supporting a fundamental mission component of the Naval History and Heritage Command, the Branch engages and informs the public and the Fleet with science-based heritage products and archaeological artifacts through a variety of outreach initiatives that aim to foster awareness, appreciation, and thereby the preservation of the Navy’s sunken military craft. These initiatives can take the form of scientific and popular publications, lectures, online content, the artifact loan program, an active academic internship program, underwater archaeological exhibits, in-person visits and tours, and support of United States Naval Academy (USNA) midshipmen and student research.

== Sample Projects ==
- CSS Alabama
- USS Alligator
- USS Cumberland
- CSS Florida
- USS Housatonic
- H. L. Hunley
- Scorpion
- USS Tecumseh
- USS Tulip
- German submarine U-1105
- Boca Chica Channel Wreck
- Penobscot Expedition
- Remote-sensing survey of D-Day Landing sites
- Search for USS Bonhomme Richard
