= Stonewall Jackson's Way =

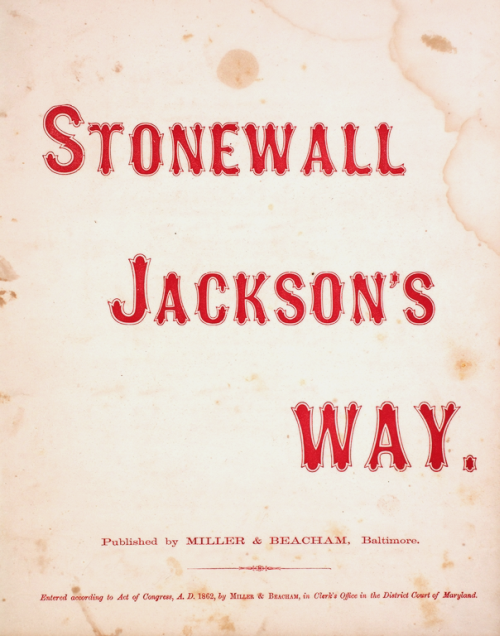
- Cover, sheet music, 1862

Song
- Language: English
- Published: 1862
- Songwriter(s): Anonymous

"Stonewall Jackson's Way" is a poem penned during the American Civil War that later became a well-known patriotic song of the Confederate States and the Southern United States. It became very popular, but its authorship was unknown until almost 25 years later.

The poem honors the famed Confederate Army officer Lieutenant General Thomas J. "Stonewall" Jackson, and was written by John Williamson Palmer (1825–1906), who stated that he had written the ballad on September 16, 1862; however, Miller & Beacham, who published the song in 1862, stated that the song was found on the body of a Confederate sergeant after the First Battle of Winchester, May 25, 1862. It is possible this alternative origin story was concocted to prevent Palmer, from Baltimore, from being arrested as a Confederate sympathizer.

The title Stonewall Jackson's Way was used for Stonewall Jackson's Way, a board wargame published by Avalon Hill in 1992.

== Poem ==
Come, stack arms, men! Pile on the rails,
Stir up the camp-fire bright;
No matter if the canteen fails,
We'll make a rousing night!
Here Shenandoah brawls along,
And burly Blue-Ridge echoes strong,
To swell our brigade's rousing song
Of "Stonewall Jackson's way."

We see him now, - the old slouched hat,
Cocked o'er his eye askew;
The shrewd, dry smile, - the speech so pat,
So calm, so blunt, so true.
The "Blue-Light Elder," his foe knows well.
Says he, "that's Banks, - he don't like shell;
Lord save his soul! we'll give him hell!"
In Stonewall Jackson's way.

Silence! ground arms! kneel all! caps off!
Old "Blue Light's" going to pray.
Strangle the fool that dares to scoff!
Attention! it's his way.
Appealing from his native sod,
In forma pauperis to God,
Say "tare Thine arm; stretch forth thy rod,
Amen!" "That's Stonewall Jackson's way."

He's in the saddle now, Fall in!
Steady the whole brigade;
Hill's at the ford, cut off, we'll win
His way out, ball and blade!
What matter if our shoes are worn?
What matter if our feet are torn?
Quick-step! we're with him ere the dawn!
That's "Stonewall Jackson's way."

The sun's bright lances, rout the mists,
Of morning, and by George!
Here's Longstreet, struggling in the lists,
Hemmed in an ugly gorge.
Pope and his Yankees, fierce before,
"Bay'nets and grape!" hear Stonewall roar;
"Charge, Stuart! Pay off Ashby's score!"
In "Stonewall Jackson's way."

Ah! Maiden, wait and watch and yearn
For news of Jackson's band!
Ah! Widow, read, with eyes that burn,
That ring upon thy hand;
Ah! Wife, sew on, pray on, hope on;
Thy life shall not be all forlorn
The foe had better ne'er been born
That gets in "Stonewall's way."

== Historical references ==
In addition to the titular Confederate Army Lieutenant General Stonewall Jackson (also referenced by another nickname, “Old Blue Light“), the poem mentions, only by surname, several other famous officers on both sides of the American Civil War—in sequential order:

- Union Major General Nathaniel P. Banks
- Confederate Lieutenant General A. P. Hill
- Confederate Lieutenant General James Longstreet
- Union Major General John Pope
- Confederate Major General J. E. B. Stuart
- Confederate Brigadier General Turner Ashby

== Bibliography ==
- Anonymous. "Stonewall Jackson's Way" (Sheet music). Baltimore: Miller & Beacham (1862).
- Holland, Rupert S. (ed.). Historic Poems and Ballads. Philadelphia: George W. Jacobs & Co. (1912).
- Miles, Dudley H., Ph.D. (ed.). The Photographic History of The Civil War In Ten Volumes, Vol 9. New York: The Review of Reviews Co. (1911).
