= South Carolina Institute of Archaeology and Anthropology =

Research institute of the University of South Carolina

- Parent institution: University of South Carolina
- Established: 1963
- Location: Columbia, South Carolina, United States
- Coordinates: 33.9993217°N 81.0298143°W
- Interactive map of South Carolina Institute of Archaeology and Anthropology
- Website: sc.edu/study/colleges_schools/artsandsciences/sc_institute_archeology_and_anthropology/index.php

The South Carolina Institute of Archaeology and Anthropology, or SCIAA, was founded in 1963 as a research institute at University of South Carolina and as a State cultural resource management agency. In the latter capacity, SCIAA is part of the Executive Department of the South Carolina State Government and serves as the main State agency concerned with the State's Archaeology (both prehistoric and historic), and its discovery, study, interpretation, publication, and official conservation at its curatorial facilities. As a University research institute, SCIAA both initiates and conducts a wide spectrum of field investigations and collections research throughout South Carolina. SCIAA participates in numerous university projects, and is a significant part of the University's infrastructure, and the University's publication series.

== History ==
In 1968, laws were passed to help control salvage that included the Hobby Diver License and under the authority of SCIAA Director Dr. Robert L. Stephenson.

The institute has 252 ancestral remains and 9,748 known funerary objects of Native Americans. The institute is in consultation with tribes under the process established under the Native American Graves Protection and Repatriation Act passed by Congress in 1990.

== Divisions ==
Among the divisions at the institute are the Maritime Research Division, studying submerged cultural heritage and shipwreck sites; the Savannah River Archaeological Research Program oversees the Savannah River Site in Ellenton for the US Department of Energy; the Allendale Paleoindian Expedition studying a Clovis and pre-Clovis site in Allendale County; and the Military Sites Research Program researching conflict and war through archaeological research.

== Camden Battlefield ==
Over a period of almost 30 years, SCIAA archaeologists James Legg and Steven D. Smith have studied and documented the site of the Battle of Camden. Beginning in 2020, the team discovered human remains and military artifacts attributed to combatants in the 1780 Revolutionary War battle. From September to November of 2022, certain areas of the site were excavated and the bodies of 14 individuals were recovered from 7 burials. One of the mass graves, Burial 9 contained 5 individuals, several of which were teenagers.

Known as the Camden Fourteen, after anthropological investigation and sampling for DNA studies, all were honored in a three day military funeral in Camden.

On June 18, 2026, the first successful Camden Fourteen DNA identification was announced. Private John Pumphrey, one of the teenagers found in Burial 9, was a member of the 7th Maryland Regiment.
