= Charleston Innovation Campus =

Branch campus of Clemson University

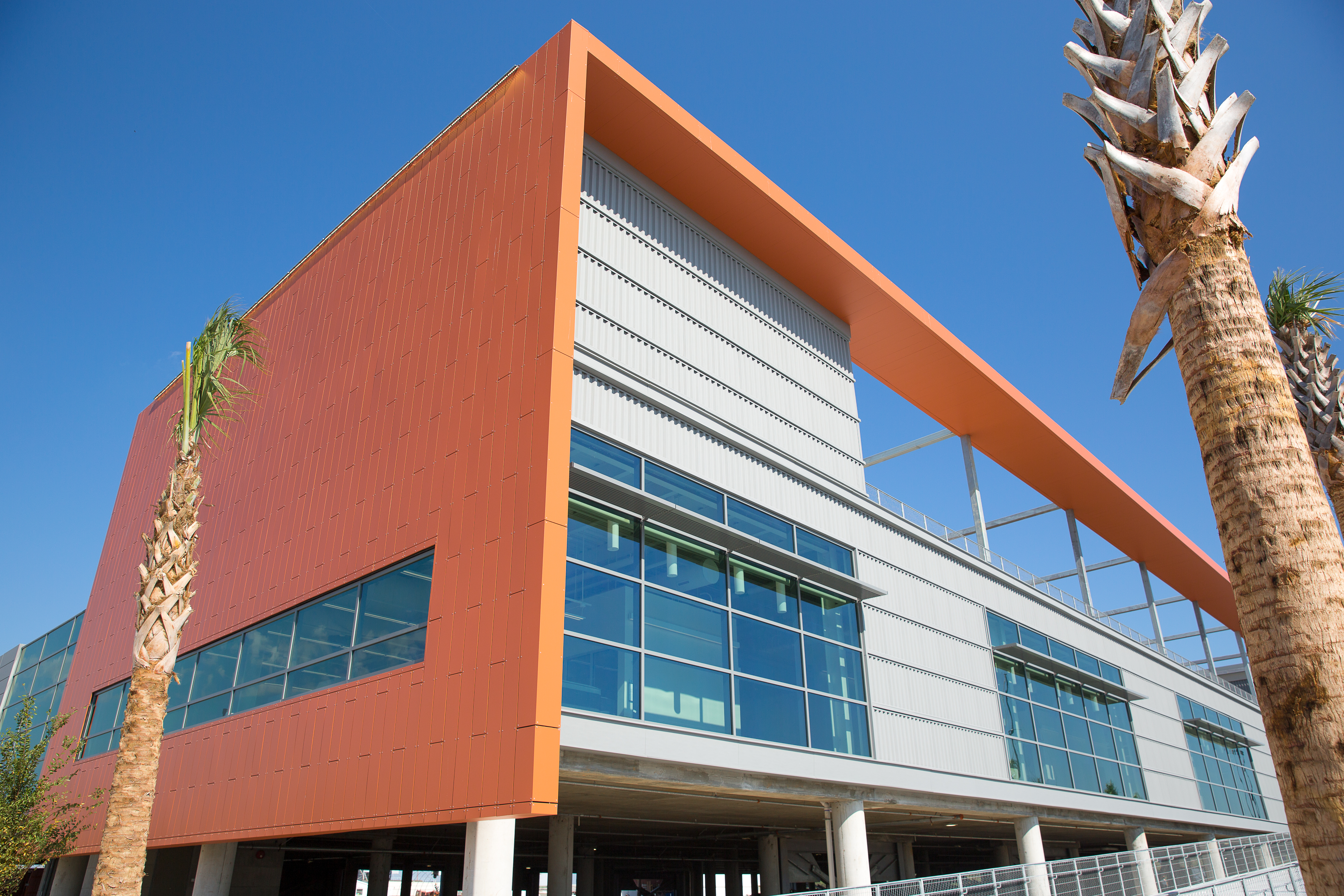
- Zucker Family Graduate Education Center
- Established: 2004; 22 years ago
- Parent institution: Clemson University
- Location: North Charleston, South Carolina, United States; 32°51′21″N 79°57′30″W
- Website: www.clemson.edu/cecas/departments/charleston/

The Charleston Innovation Campus is a branch campus of Clemson University, located at the former Charleston Navy Yard in North Charleston, South Carolina. It was established in 2004, and houses the Warren Lasch Conservation Center, Dominion Energy Innovation Center, and the Zucker Family Graduate Education Center.

== Warren Lasch Conservation Center ==
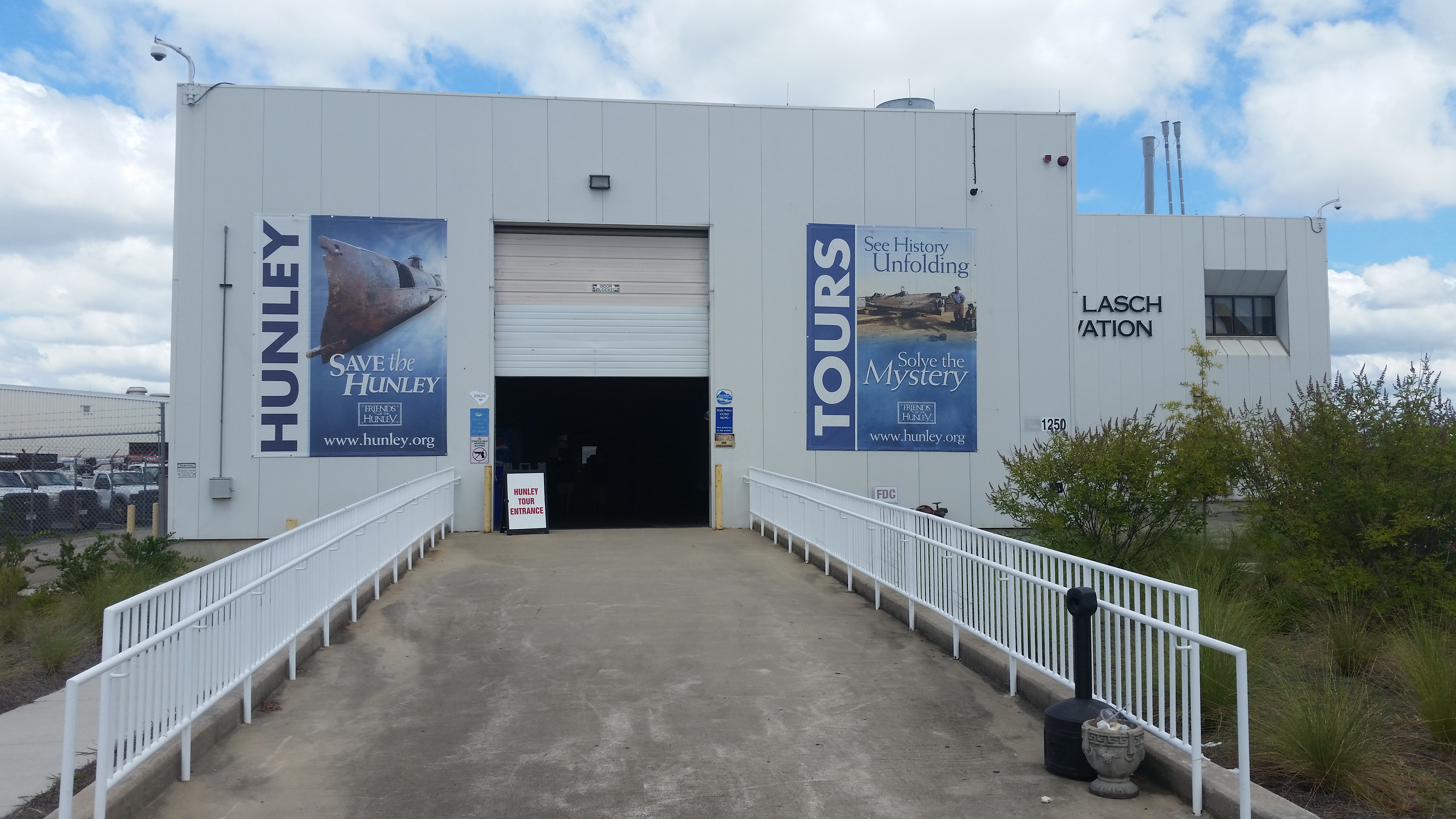
Warren Lasch Conservation Center

The Warren Lasch Conservation Center was established in 2000 for the conservation and restoration of the submarine H.L. Hunley. The namesake of the building is Warren F. Lasch, who was chairman of Friends of the Hunley during the Hunley's recovery. The Hunley is housed in a specially designed tank of sodium hydroxide. The center became part of Clemson in 2004, and its scope expanded into research of various metal and architectural conservation topics.

== Dominion Energy Innovation Center ==
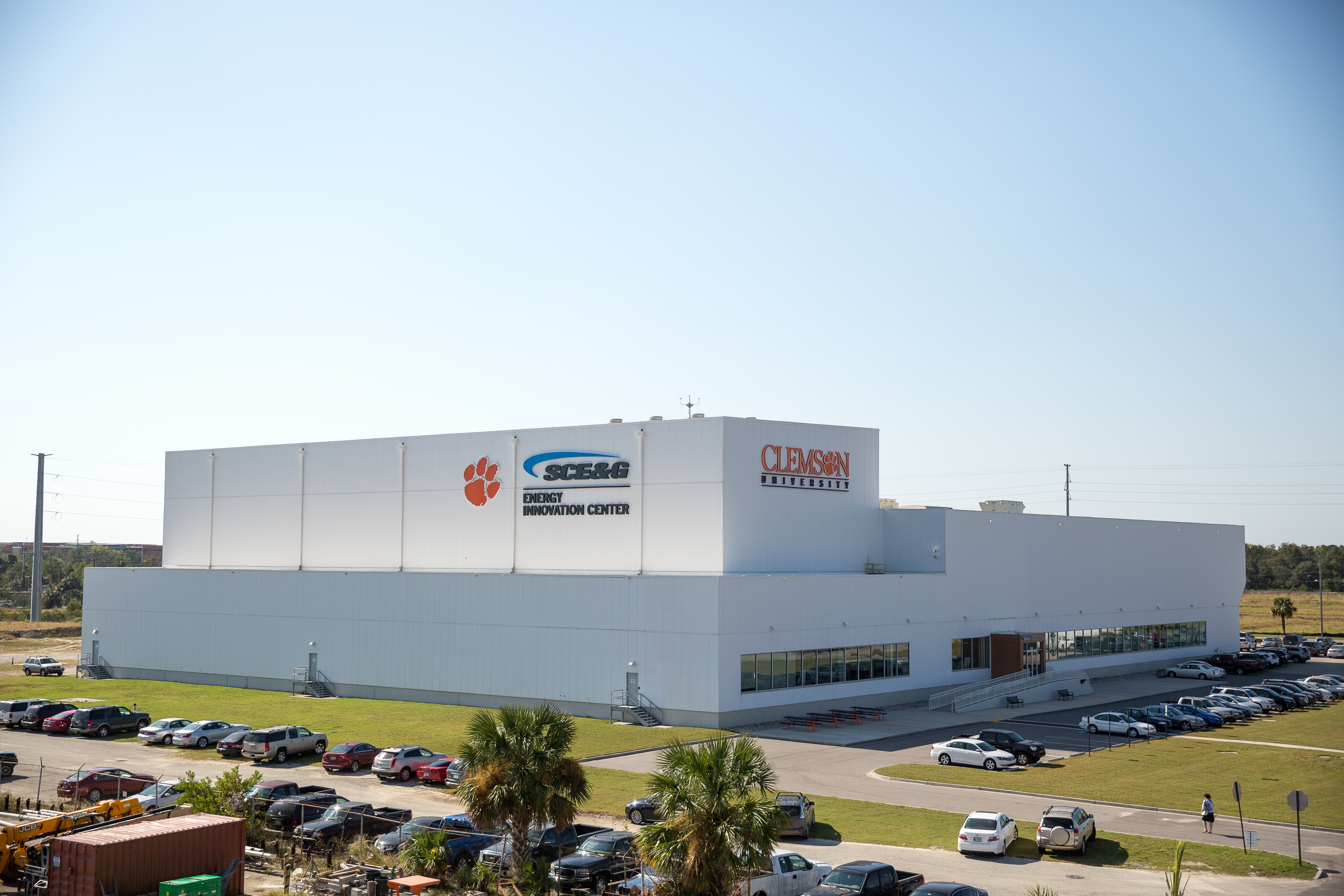
Dominion Energy Innovation Center

The Energy Innovation center opened in 2013 with the help of a $45 million grant from the U.S. Department of Energy. The center houses 7.5- and 15-megawatt test rigs for offshore wind power units and a 15-megawatt grid simulator.

== Zucker Family Graduate Education Center ==
The Zucker Family Graduate Education Center opened in 2016. The center offers graduate programs in disciplines including computer science, computer engineering, digital production arts, electrical engineering, mechanical engineering, and systems engineering.
