= List of films and television shows about the American Civil War =

The following is a list of films and television shows about the American Civil War (1861–1865).

== 1910s ==
Year	Country	Title (Alternative title)	Director	Subject
1912	United States	Chattanooga	Lincoln J. Carter	War. Chattanooga campaign
1913	United States	The Girl of the Sunny South	Travers Vale	Drama.
1913	United States	The Battle of Gettysburg	Charles Giblyn; Thomas H. Ince	Drama, War. Battle of Gettysburg
1913	United States	The Battle of Shiloh	Joseph W. Smiley	Drama, War. Battle of Shiloh
1913	United States	The Seed of the Fathers	Stanner E.V. Taylor	Drama, War.
1914	United States	The Littlest Rebel	Edgar Lewis	Drama, War. Based on the play The Littlest Rebel.
1914	United States	Dan	George Irving; Jack Pratt	Drama, War.
1915	United States	Life of Sam Davis: A Confederate Hero of the Sixties		Drama, History. Sam Davis
1915	United States	'Twas Ever Thus	Hobart Bosworth	Drama, War.
1915	United States	Under Southern Skies	Lucius J. Henderson	Drama. Based on the play Under Southern Skies.
1915	United States	May Blossom	Allan Dwan	Drama. Based on the play May Blossom.
1915	United States	The Heart of Lincoln	Francis Ford	Drama, History.
1915	United States	Barbara Frietchie	Herbert Blaché	Drama. Based on the play Barbara Frietchie.
1915	United States	The Heart of Maryland	Herbert Brenon	Drama, History, War. Based on the play The Heart of Maryland.
1915	United States	The Coward	Reginald Barker	Drama, History, War. Based on an unknown story.
1915	United States	The Warrens of Virginia	Cecil B. DeMille	Drama, War.
1915	United States	The Birth of a Nation	D. W. Griffith	Drama, History, War. Based on a novel The Clansman: A Historical Romance of the Ku Klux Klan.
1915	United States	Colonel Carter of Cartersville	Howell Hansel	Drama, History.
1916	United States	Rose of the South	Paul Scardon	Drama, History.
1916	United States	Peck o' Pickles	Thomas N. Heffron	Comedy, Drama.
1916	United States	The Crisis	Colin Campbell	Drama, History, War. Based on a novel The Crisis.
1916	United States	Naked Hearts	Rupert Julian	Drama.
1916	United States	Her Father's Son	William Desmond Taylor	Comedy.
1916	United States	The Sting of Victory	J. Charles Haydon	Drama.
1916	United States	According to the Code	E. H. Calvert	Drama, War.
1917	United States	Your Obedient Servant	Edward H. Griffith	Drama.
1917	United States	Those Without Sin	Marshall Neilan	Drama.
1917	United Kingdom	Little Women	Alexander Butler	Drama, Romance, Family. Based on a novel Little Women.
1917	United States	The Little Yank	George Siegmann	War, Drama.
1917	United States	Her Country's Call	Lloyd Ingraham	Biography, Drama.
1917	United States	The Field of Honor	Allen Holubar	Drama.
1917	United States	The Spreading Dawn	Laurence Trimble	Drama. Based on a short fiction The Spreading Dawn.
1918	United States	My Own United States	John W. Noble	Drama. Based on the short story The Man Without a Country.
1918	United States	Morgan's Raiders	Bess Meredyth; Wilfred Lucas	Drama.
1918	United States	Madam Who?	Reginald Barker	Drama. Confederate Secret Service
1918	United States	Woman	Maurice Tourneur	Drama, War.
1918	United States	The Last Rebel	Gilbert P. Hamilton	Drama.
1918	United States	Little Women	Harley Knoles	Drama, Family, Romance. Based on a novel Little Women.
1918	United States	Hearts of Love	J. Charles Haydon	Drama, History, War.
1918	United States	The Scarlet Drop	John Ford	Western.
1919	United States	Secret Service	Hugh Ford	Drama, War. Based on the play Secret Service. American Civil War spies
1919	United States	Hay Foot, Straw Foot	Jerome Storm	Comedy.

== 1920s ==
Year	Country	Title (Alternative title)	Director	Subject
1920	United States	The Kentucky Colonel	William A. Seiter	Drama. Based on a novel A Kentucky Colonel.
1920	United States	Held by the Enemy	Donald Crisp; Wilton Welch	Drama, War. Based on the play Held by the Enemy.
1920	United States	The Little Shepherd of Kingdom Come	Wallace Worsley	Drama, History, War. Based on a novel The Little Shepherd of Kingdom Come.
1920	United States	Hitchin' Posts	John Ford	Drama.
1920	United States	The Copperhead	Charles Maigne	Drama. Based on the novel The Glory of His Country and based on the play The Copperhead.
1921	United States	Jesse James Under the Black Flag	Franklin B. Coates	History, Western. Jesse James
1921	United States	Johnny Ring and the Captain's Sword	Norman L. Stevens	Drama.
1921	United States	The Highest Law	Ralph Ince	Drama.
1921	United States	The Heart of Maryland	Tom Terriss	Drama. Based on the play The Heart of Maryland.
1922	United States	The Heart of Lincoln	Francis Ford	War.
1924	United States	The Warrens of Virginia	Elmer Clifton	Drama, Romance. American Civil War spies
1924	United States	Barbara Frietchie	Lambert Hillyer	Drama, War. Based on the play Barbara Frietchie.
1924	United States	Abraham Lincoln	Phil Rosen	Biography, Drama, History. Abraham Lincoln
1926	United States	Hands Up!	Clarence G. Badger	Action, Comedy, War.
1926	United States	The General	Clyde Bruckman; Buster Keaton	Action, Adventure, Comedy, Drama, War. Based on a memoir The Great Locomotive Chase. Great Locomotive Chase
1927	United States	Jesse James	Lloyd Ingraham	Western.
1927	United States	The Heart of Maryland	Lloyd Bacon	Action, Drama, Romance, War. Based on the play The Heart of Maryland.
1928	United States	The Little Shepherd of Kingdom Come	Alfred Santell	Drama, Romance. Based on a novel The Little Shepherd of Kingdom Come.
1928	United States	Court Martial	George B. Seitz	Action, Adventure, Drama, History, Romance, War, Western.
1928	United States	The Overland Telegraph	John Waters	Western.
1929	United States	The California Mail	Albert S. Rogell	Western.
1929	United States	Morgan's Last Raid	Nick Grinde	Adventure, Romance, War, Western.

== 1930s ==
Year	Country	Title (Alternative title)	Director	Subject
1930	United States	Only the Brave	Frank Tuttle	Action, Drama, Music, Mystery, Romance, War. American Civil War spies
1930	United States	Abraham Lincoln	D. W. Griffith	Biography, Drama, War. Abraham Lincoln
1931	United States	Secret Service	J. Walter Ruben; James Anderson	Drama, History, Romance, War, Western. Based on the play Secret Service. American Civil War spies
1933	United States	Little Women	George Cukor	Drama, Family, Romance, War. Based on a novel Little Women.
1934	United States	Operator 13	Richard Boleslawski	Drama, History, Musical, Romance, War, Western. Based on the novel Secret Service Operator 13. American Civil War spies
1935	United States	So Red the Rose	King Vidor	Drama, Romance, War. Based on a novel So Red the Rose.
1935	United States	The Littlest Rebel	David Butler	Comedy, Drama, Family, Musical, War. Based on the play The Littlest Rebel.
1936	United States	The Prisoner of Shark Island	John Ford	Biography, Drama, History. Samuel Mudd
1936	United States	Trailin' West	Noel M. Smith	Western. American Civil War spies
1936	United States	Hearts in Bondage	Lew Ayres	Drama, History, Romance, War. List of naval battles of the American Civil War
1936	United States	General Spanky	Fred C. Newmeyer; Gordon Douglas	Comedy, Family, War.
1937	Sweden	John Ericsson, Victor of Hampton Roads (John Ericsson - segraren vid Hampton Roads)	Gustaf Edgren	Biography, Drama, History, War, Western. John Ericsson
1937	United States	Western Gold	Howard Bretherton	Action, Music, Western.
1937	United States	Wells Fargo	Frank Lloyd	Drama, History, Western.
1938	United States	Of Human Hearts	Clarence Brown	Drama, Western.
1939	United States	Southward Ho	Joseph Kane	Western.
1939	United States	Swanee River	Sidney Lanfield	Biography, Drama, Musical. Stephen Foster
1939	United States	Frontier Pony Express	Joseph Kane	Drama, Music, Western. American Civil War spies
1939	United States	The Arizona Kid	Joseph Kane	Drama, Music, Western.
1939	United States	The Old Maid	Edmund Goulding	Drama. Based on the play The Old Maid.
1939	United States	Gone with the Wind	Victor Fleming	Drama, Romance, War. Based on a novel Gone with the Wind.

== 1940s ==
Year	Country	Title (Alternative title)	Director	Subject
1940	United States	Arizona	Wesley Ruggles	Drama, Western.
1940	United States	Young Bill Hickok	Joseph Kane	Drama, Music, Western.
1940	United States	Colorado	Joseph Kane	Drama, Music, Western.
1940	United States	The Man from Dakota	Leslie Fenton	Drama, History, War, Western. Based on a novel Arouse and Beware.
1940	United States	Virginia City	Michael Curtiz	Drama, Western.
1940	United States	Dark Command	Raoul Walsh	Drama, Western. Quantrill's Raiders
1941	United States	Belle Starr	Irving Cummings	Drama, Western. Belle Starr
1941	United States	They Died with Their Boots On	Raoul Walsh	Biography, Drama, Romance, War, Western. George Armstrong Custer
1942	United States	Tennessee Johnson	William Dieterle	Biography, Drama. Andrew Johnson
1943	United States	The Desperadoes	Charles Vidor	Western.
1944	United States	Oklahoma Raiders	Lewis D. Collins	Drama, Music, Western.
1944	United States	Raiders of Ghost City	Lewis D. Collins; Ray Taylor	Action, Adventure, Drama, History, Western.
1946	United States	Renegade Girl	William Berke	Drama, Western.
1947	United States	The Romance of Rosy Ridge	Roy Rowland	Romance, Western. Based on a novel The Romance of Rosy Ridge.
1948	United States	Son of God's Country	R. G. Springsteen	Drama, Western.
1948	United States	Silver River	Raoul Walsh	Drama, Romance, Western. Based on an unknown story.
1948	United States	Tap Roots	George Marshall	Drama, Romance, War, Western. Newton Knight
1948	United States	A Southern Yankee	Edward Sedgwick	Comedy, History, War, Western. American Civil War spies
1948	United States	The Man from Colorado	Henry Levin	Romance, Western.
1949	United States	Fighting Man of the Plains	Edwin L. Marin	Western. Quantrill's Raiders
1949	United States	Law of the Golden West	Philip Ford	Drama, Western.
1949	United States	Little Women	Mervyn LeRoy	Drama, Family, Romance. Based on a novel Little Women.
1949	United States	South of St. Louis	Ray Enright	Western.

== 1950s ==
Year	Country	Title (Alternative title)	Director	Subject
1950	United States	The Eagle and the Hawk	Lewis R. Foster	Western. American Civil War spies
1950	United States	The Outriders	Roy Rowland	Western.
1950	United States	Kansas Raiders	Ray Enright	Drama, Western.
1950	United States	Two Flags West	Robert Wise	War, Western. Galvanized Yankees
1950	United States	Rocky Mountain	William Keighley	Action, Adventure, Drama, Western.
1951	United States	The Great Missouri Raid	Gordon Douglas	Western.
1951	United States	Red Mountain	William Dieterle; John Farrow	Drama, Western. Quantrill's Raiders
1951	United States	Silver Canyon	John English	Drama, Music, Western.
1951	United States	Best of the Badmen	William D. Russell	Western.
1951	United States	The Redhead and the Cowboy	Leslie Fenton	Drama, Romance, Western.
1951	United States	Drums in the Deep South	William Cameron Menzies	Western. Based on the short story Woman with a Sword.
1951	United States	The Last Outpost	Lewis R. Foster	Drama, Western.
1951	United States	The Red Badge of Courage	John Huston	Drama, War. Based on a novel The Red Badge of Courage.
1951	United States	Springfield Rifle	Andre de Toth	Thriller, War, Western. American Civil War spies
1952	United States	Hangman's Knot	Roy Huggins	Drama, Western.
1952	United States	Behind Southern Lines	Thomas Carr	Action, Adventure, Drama, War, Western.
1953	United States	The Stranger Wore a Gun	Andre de Toth	Drama, War, Western. Based on the short story Yankee Gold.
1953	United States	Rebel City	Thomas Carr	Drama, Western.
1953	United States	Woman They Almost Lynched	Allan Dwan	Western.
1953	United States	Jack McCall, Desperado	Sidney Salkow	Drama, Western.
1953	United States	Kansas Pacific	Ray Nazarro	Western. Kansas Pacific Railway
1953	United States	Escape from Fort Bravo	John Sturges	Drama, Romance, Western.
1954	United States	Border River	George Sherman	Drama, Western.
1954	United States	Siege at Red River	Rudolph Maté	Drama, Western.
1954	United States	The Black Dakotas	Ray Nazarro	Western.
1954	United States	The Raid	Hugo Fregonese	Drama, War, Western. Based on the short story Affair at St. Albans. St. Albans Raid
1955	United States	Prince of Players	Philip Dunne	Biography, Drama. Based on the book Prince of Players. Edwin Booth, John Wilkes Booth, Assassination of Abraham Lincoln.
1955	United States	Yellowneck	R. John Hugh	Adventure, Drama, War, Western.
1955	United States	Apache Ambush	Fred F. Sears	Drama, Western.
1955	United States	Five Guns West	Roger Corman	Drama, Western.
1956	United States	Great Day in the Morning	Jacques Tourneur	Drama, Western. Based on a novel Great Day in the Morning.
1956	United States	The Great Locomotive Chase	Francis D. Lyon	Action, Adventure, Family, War, Western. Great Locomotive Chase
1956	United States	Love Me Tender	Robert D. Webb	Drama, Musical, Romance, Western.
1956	United States	Friendly Persuasion	William Wyler	Drama, Family, Romance, War, Western. Based on a novel The Friendly Persuasion.
1957	United States	Ride a Violent Mile	Charles Marquis Warren	Action, Adventure, Drama, War, Western.
1957	United States	The Guns of Fort Petticoat	George Marshall	Action, Romance, War, Western. Based on a short story Petticoat Brigade.
1957	United States	Drango	Hall Bartlett; Jules Bricken	Western.
1957	United States	Run of the Arrow	Samuel Fuller	Drama, Western.
1957	United States	Revolt at Fort Laramie	Lesley Selander	Western.
1957	United States	Band of Angels	Raoul Walsh	Drama. Based on a novel Band of Angels.
1957	United States	Raintree County	Edward Dmytryk	Drama, Romance, War, Western. Based on a novel Raintree County.
1958	United States	Quantrill's Raiders	Edward Bernds	Western.
1959	United States	Westbound	Budd Boetticher	Drama, Western.
1959	United States	The Legend of Tom Dooley	Ted Post	Drama, Western. Based on the song Tom Dooley. Tom Dula
1959	United States	The Horse Soldiers	John Ford	Adventure, Drama, Romance, War, Western. Based on a novel The Horse Soldiers. Grierson's Raid

== 1960s ==
Year	Country	Title (Alternative title)	Director	Subject
1960	United States	13 Fighting Men	Harry W. Gerstad	Drama, War, Western.
1960	United States	Young Jesse James	William F. Claxton	Action, Adventure, War, Western.
1961	United States	The Little Shepherd of Kingdom Come	Andrew V. McLaglen	Drama, History, Romance, War, Western. Based on a novel The Little Shepherd of Kingdom Come.
1962	France	In the Midst of Life (Au cœur de la vie)	Robert Enrico	Drama, War. Based on the stories by Ambrose Bierce.
1962	United States	How the West Was Won	Henry Hathaway; John Ford; George Marshall	Western.
1963	United States	Red Runs the River	Katherine Stenholm	Drama, History, War. Richard S. Ewell, First Battle of Bull Run, Second Battle of Bull Run
1964	United States	Advance to the Rear	George Marshall	Comedy, War, Western. Based on a novel Company of Cowards.
1965	Spain; United States	Finger on the Trigger	Sidney W. Pink	Drama, Western.
1965	United States	Arizona Raiders	William Witney	Western.
1965	United States	Major Dundee	Sam Peckinpah	Adventure, Drama, War, Western.
1965	United States	Shenandoah	Andrew V. McLaglen	Drama, War, Western. Based on a novel Fields of Honor.
1966	Italy	Three Graves for a Winchester (Three Bullets for Ringo) (3 colpi di Winchester per Ringo)	Emimmo Salvi	Drama, Western.
1966	United States	Incident at Phantom Hill	Earl Bellamy	Western.
1966	United States	Alvarez Kelly	Edward Dmytryk	Drama, Western. Beefsteak Raid
1966	Italy; Spain; West Germany	The Good, the Bad and the Ugly (Il buono, il brutto, il cattivo)	Sergio Leone	Adventure, Western.
1967	Italy	Day of Violence (I giorni della violenza)	Alfonso Brescia	Drama, Western.
1967	Italy; Spain	Red Blood, Yellow Gold (Professionisti per un massacro) (Los profesionales de la muerte)	Nando Cicero	Action, Adventure, Drama, Western.
1967	United States	Mosby's Marauders	Michael O'Herlihy	Action, Adventure, History, War, Western.
1967	United States	The Fastest Guitar Alive	Mickey Moore	Western. American Civil War spies
1967	United States	A Time for Killing	Phil Karlson	Drama, Western. Based on a novel The Southern Blade.
1968	Italy; Spain	I Want Him Dead (Lo voglio morto) (Lo quiero muerto)	Paolo Bianchini	Western.
1968	Italy; Spain	Kill Them All and Come Back Alone (Ammazzali tutti e torna solo)	Enzo G. Castellari	Action, Western.
1968	United States	Arizona Bushwhackers	Lesley Selander	Drama, Romance, Western.
1968	United States	Journey to Shiloh	William Hale	Drama, War, Western. Based on a novel Journey to Shiloh.
1969	United States	The Desperados	Henry Levin	Western.
1969	United States	The Undefeated	Andrew V. McLaglen	Action, Adventure, Drama, Romance, War, Western. Joseph O. Shelby

== 1970s ==
Year	Country	Title (Alternative title)	Director	Subject
1970	United States; Mexico	Rio Lobo	Howard Hawks	War, Western.
1971	United States	The Beguiled	Don Siegel	Drama, Thriller, War. Based on a novel A Painted Devil.
1972	Sweden	The New Land (Nybyggarna)	Jan Troell	Drama, Western. Based on a novels The Emigrants.
1972	Italy; France; West Germany; Spain	A Reason to Live, a Reason to Die (Una Ragione Per Vivere E Una Per Morire)	Tonino Valerii	Drama, Western.
1972	United States	No Drums, No Bugles	Clyde Ware	Drama, War.
1973	Italy; Spain	Fasthand (Mi chiamavano "Requiescat"... ma avevano sbagliato) (Mano rápida)	Mario Bianchi	Western.
1973	United Kingdom; United States	Charley One-Eye	Don Chaffey	Western.
1975	Hungary	American Torso (Amerikai anzix)	Gábor Bódy	Drama.
1976	United States	The Outlaw Josey Wales	Clint Eastwood	Western. Based on a novel The Rebel Outlaw: Josey Wales.
1977	United States	The Lincoln Conspiracy	James L. Conway	Drama. Based on the book The Lincoln Conspiracy. Assassination of Abraham Lincoln

== 1980s ==
Year	Country	Title (Alternative title)	Director	Subject
1985	United States	Rebel Love	Milton Bagby	Drama, Romance, War.
1989	United States	Glory	Edward Zwick	Biography, Drama, History, War. Based on the books Lay This Laurel, One Gallant Rush and Robert Gould Shaw letters. 54th Massachusetts Infantry Regiment, Second Battle of Fort Wagner

== 1990s ==
Year	Country	Title (Alternative title)	Director	Subject
1990	United States	Across Five Aprils	Kevin Meyer	Drama, History, War. Based on a novel Across Five Aprils.
1990	United States; United Kingdom	Dances with Wolves	Kevin Costner	Adventure, Drama, Western. Based on a novel Dances with Wolves.
1993	France; United States	Sommersby	Jon Amiel	Drama, Mystery, Romance.
1993	United States	Gettysburg	Ronald F. Maxwell	Drama, History, War. Based on a novel The Killer Angels. Battle of Gettysburg
1994	United States; Canada	Little Women	Gillian Armstrong	Drama, Family, Romance. Based on a novel Little Women.
1995	United States	Ozarks: Legacy & Legend	Kieth Merrill	History, Western.
1995	United States	Pharaoh's Army	Robby Henson	Western.
1999	United States	Ride with the Devil	Ang Lee	Drama, Romance, War, Western. Based on a novel Woe to Live On.

== 2000s ==
Year	Country	Title (Alternative title)	Director	Subject
2000	United States	Blood and Honor	Donald Farmer	Action, Drama, War.
2001	United States	American Outlaws	Les Mayfield	Action, Western.
2002	United States	Wicked Spring	Kevin Hershberger	Drama, War, Western. Battle of the Wilderness
2002	Italy; United States	Gangs of New York	Martin Scorsese	Crime, Drama. Based on the book The Gangs of New York. New York City draft riots
2003	United States	Gods and Generals	Ronald F. Maxwell	Biography, Drama, History, War. Based on a novel Gods and Generals. Stonewall Jackson
2003	United States; Italy; Romania; United Kingdom	Cold Mountain	Anthony Minghella	Adventure, Drama, Romance, War. Based on a novel Cold Mountain.
2004	United States	Gettysburg: Three Days of Destiny	Robert Child	Action, Drama, History, War. Battle of Gettysburg
2004	United States	C.S.A.: The Confederate States of America	Kevin Willmott	Comedy, Drama, War.
2005	United States	The Battle of Aiken	Christopher Forbes	Action. Battle of Aiken
2005	United States	My Brother's War	Whitney Hamilton	Drama, Romance, War.
2006	United States	Prairie Rose	Rebecca Sutera Tulloch	Drama. Camp Douglas
2007	United States	Johnny	R. David Burns	Biography, War. John Clem
2007	United States	Freedom	Rick McVey	Drama, History, War.
2007	United States	Sons of Virginia	Dale Jackson	Action, History, War.
2007	United States	The Last Confederate: The Story of Robert Adams	A. Blaine Miller	Action, Biography, Drama, History, Romance, War, Western.
2008	United States	The Notorious Colonel Steel	Christopher Forbes	Drama, Western.

== 2010s ==
Year	Country	Title (Alternative title)	Director	Subject
2010	United States	The Battle of Pussy Willow Creek	Wendy Jo Cohen	Comedy, History, War.
2010	United States	Lost River: Lincoln's Secret Weapon	Rachel Gordon; Jason Urban	History. Anna Ella Carroll
2010	United States	The Conspirator	Robert Redford	Crime, Drama, History. Mary Surratt, Assassination of Abraham Lincoln
2010	United States	Dog Jack	Edward T. McDougal	Drama, War. Based on the book Dog Jack.
2011	United States	The Civil War on Drugs	Zach Cregger; Trevor Moore	Comedy, History, War.
2012	United States	Civil Love	Bryan Carzan	Drama, Romance.
2012	United States	Cole Younger & The Black Train	Christopher Forbes	Western. James–Younger Gang
2012	United States	Hatfields and McCoys: Bad Blood	Fred Olen Ray	Drama, Western. Hatfield–McCoy feud
2012	United States	War Flowers	Serge Rodnunsky	Drama, History, War.
2012	United States; India	Lincoln	Steven Spielberg	Biography, Drama, History, War. Based on the book Team of Rivals. Abraham Lincoln
2013	United States	The Light of Freedom	Kim Robinson	Drama, Family, History.
2013	United States	The Retrieval	Chris Eska	Adventure, Drama, Western.
2013	United States	Saving Lincoln	Salvador Litvak	Biography, Drama, History. Ward Hill Lamon
2013	United States	Copperhead	Ronald F. Maxwell	Drama. Based on a novel The Copperhead.
2014	United States	Confederate Cavalry	Christopher Forbes	War.
2014	United States	Field of Lost Shoes	Sean McNamara	Action, Drama, War. Battle of New Market
2014	United States	The Keeping Room	Daniel Barber	Drama, Western.
2014	United States	Firetrail	Christopher Forbes	War, Western.
2015	United States	Men Go to Battle	Zachary Treitz	Comedy, Drama, War.
2015	United States	Perfect Disguise	Christopher Forbes	Western.
2016	United States	Josephine	Rory Feek	Drama, History.
2016	United States	The War Riders	Christopher Forbes	War.
2016	United States	Union Bound	Harvey Lowry	Action, Drama, History.
2016	United States; China	Free State of Jones	Gary Ross	Action, Biography, Drama, History, War, Western. Newton Knight, Jones County
2017	United States	The Last Gunslinger	Christopher Forbes	Western.
2017	United States	Without a Country	Brad Clark	Adventure, Drama, History.
2017	United States	The Beguiled	Sofia Coppola	Drama, Thriller, War. Based on a novel The Beguiled.
2018	United States	The Confederate	Christopher Forbes	History.
2018	United States	Union	Whitney Hamilton	Drama, History, War.
2019	China; United States	Harriet	Kasi Lemmons	Action, Biography, Drama, History. Harriet Tubman
2019	France; Canada; Belgium	The Savage State (L'État sauvage)	David Perrault	Drama, Western.
2019	United States	American Confederate	Christopher Forbes	Western.
2019	United States	Little Women	Greta Gerwig	Drama, Romance. Based on a novel Little Women.
2019	United States	A Rebel Born	Christopher Forbes	Action. Nathan Bedford Forrest

== 2020s ==
Year	Country	Title (Alternative title)	Director	Subject
2020	United States	The Burning of Atlanta	Christopher Forbes	Action, History. Battle of Atlanta
2021	United States	Foxhole	Jack Fessenden	Drama, War.
2021	United States	Vivandière	James R. Temple	Action.
2021	United States	Kill Cavalry	Christopher Forbes	War. Hugh Judson Kilpatrick
2021	United States	Hampton's Legion	Christopher Forbes	Action, War. Wade Hampton III
2022	United States	Civil War Saint	Ashley Hays Wright	War.
2022	United States	Emancipation	Antoine Fuqua	Action, Thriller.
2022	United States	Submerged	Christopher Forbes	War. Sinking of USS Housatonic
2022	United States	Band of Rebels	Christopher Forbes	Western.
2022	United States	Jesse James: Unchained	Henrique Couto	Western.
2022	United States	Freedom's Path	Brett Smith	Drama, History, War.
2023	United States	Hampton's iron scouts	Christopher Forbes	
2023	United States	Jesse James and Quantrill's Raiders	Christopher Forbes	Jesse James, Quantrill's Raiders
2023	United States	Treasure Train	Christopher Forbes	Based on the book The Treasure Train.
2023	United States	Letters to Freedom	Joshua Williams	Drama, Romance, War.
2023	United States	Storm Over Georgia	Christopher Forbes	Drama, History, War.
2023	Mexico; Canada; Denmark	The Dead Don't Hurt	Viggo Mortensen	Drama, Western.
2024	United States	Horizon: An American Saga – Chapter 1	Kevin Costner	Drama, Western.
2024	United States	Horizon: An American Saga – Chapter 2	Kevin Costner	Drama, Western.
2024	Italy; Belgium; United States; France; Canada	The Damned	Roberto Minervini	Drama, History.
2025	United States	Sherman’s March through the Carolinas	Christopher Forbes	Carolinas campaign
2025	United States	Blood Feud: The Hatfield's and the Mccoy's	Christopher Forbes	Action, Drama, History. Hatfield–McCoy feud
2025	United States	Treasure Train: The Lost Confederate Gold	Christopher Forbes	Action, Drama, War.
2025	United States	The War Between	Deborah Correa	Drama, History, War.
2026	United States	The Legend of Van Dorn	Shane Stanley	Biography, History, Romance, War, Western. Holly Springs Raid, Battle of Thompson's Station, Earl Van Dorn

== Science fiction, fantasy and horror ==
Year	Country	Title (Alternative title)	Director	Subject
1941	Soviet Union	Mysterious Island (Таинственный остров)	Eduard Pentslin	Adventure, Sci-Fi, Family. Based on a novel The Mysterious Island.
1961	United Kingdom	Mysterious Island	Cy Endfield	Adventure, Family, Fantasy, Sci-Fi. Based on a novel The Mysterious Island.
1973	Spain; France	The Mysterious Island (L'Île Mysterieuse) (La Isla misteriosa y el capitán Nemo) (Die Geheimnisvolle Insel)	Juan Antonio Bardem; Henri Colpi	Adventure, Mystery, Sci-Fi. Based on a novel The Mysterious Island.
1987	United States	From a Whisper to a Scream	Jeff Burr	Action, Drama, Horror, Mystery, Thriller.
1993	United States	Ghost Brigade	George Hickenlooper	Horror, War.
2004	United States	Dead Birds	Alex Turner	Horror, Thriller, Western.
2005	United States	An Occurrence at Owl Creek Bridge	Brian James Egen	Drama, Romance, Sci-Fi, Thriller. Based on a short story An Occurrence at Owl Creek Bridge.
2011	Canada	Exit Humanity	John Geddes	Drama, Horror.
2012	United States	Jules Verne's Mysterious Island	Mark Sheppard	Adventure, Fantasy, Horror, Sci-Fi. Based on a novel The Mysterious Island.
2012	United States	Abraham Lincoln vs. Zombies	Richard Schenkman	Action, Comedy, Horror. Abraham Lincoln
2012	United States; Russia	Abraham Lincoln: Vampire Hunter	Timur Bekmambetov	Action, Fantasy, Horror. Based on a novel Abraham Lincoln, Vampire Hunter. Abraham Lincoln
2013	United States	Shroud	David Jetre	Action, Drama, Horror, Mystery, Thriller, Western.
2014	United States	Army of Frankensteins	Ryan Bellgardt	Adventure, Horror, Sci-Fi.
2015	Germany	Dead or alive (Tot oder Lebendig)	Jochen Taubert	Action, Horror, Western.
2016	United States	Dead South	Craig Ross Jr.	Action, Drama, Horror, Thriller.
2017	United States	Dead Again in Tombstone	Roel Reiné	Action, Fantasy, Horror, Western.
2020	Germany	Scalped alive (Lebendig skalpiert)	Jochen Taubert	Comedy, Horror, Western.

== Television films ==
Year	Country	Title (Alternative title)	Director	Subject
1946	United States	Little Women	Ernest Colling	Family, Drama, Romance. Based on a novel Little Women.
1958	United States	Little Women	William Corrigan	Musical, Drama, Family, Romance. Based on a novel Little Women.
1960	United States	The Renegade	Rudolph Maté	Adventure.
1963	United States	Johnny Shiloh	James Nielson	Adventure, Family, War, Western. John Clem
1970	United States	Menace on the Mountain	Vincent McEveety	Drama, Family, History, War, Western.
1970	United States	The Andersonville Trial	George C. Scott	Drama. Based on the play The Andersonville Trial. Henry Wirz
1971	United States	They've Killed President Lincoln!	Robert Guenette	Drama, History. Assassination of Abraham Lincoln
1971	United States	The Last Rebel	Denys McCoy	Western.
1974	United States	The Autobiography of Miss Jane Pittman	John Korty	Drama, History. Based on a novel The Autobiography of Miss Jane Pittman.
1974	United States	The Red Badge of Courage	Lee Philips	Drama, War, Western. Based on a novel The Red Badge of Courage.
1975	Yugoslavia	Andersonville - Death Camp (Андерсонвил — Логор смрти) (Andersonvil — Logor smrti)	Sava Mrmak	Drama, History, War. Based on the play The Andersonville Trial. Henry Wirz
1975	United States	The Hatfields and the McCoys	Clyde Ware	Action, Drama, Western. Hatfield–McCoy feud
1975	United States	Friendly Persuasion	Joseph Sargent	Drama. Based on the novels The Friendly Persuasion, Except for Me and Thee.
1978	United States	The Million Dollar Dixie Deliverance	Russ Mayberry	Adventure, Drama, Family.
1979	Canada; United States	One of the Missing	J.D. Feigelson	Drama. Based on a short story One of the Missing.
1979	United States	Love's Savage Fury	Joseph Hardy	Drama, Western.
1979	United States	The Legend of the Golden Gun	Alan J. Levi	Fantasy, Western. William Quantrill
1980	United States	The Ordeal of Dr. Mudd	Paul Wendkos	Biography, Drama, History. Samuel Mudd
1981	West Germany; United States	The Private History of a Campaign That Failed	Peter H. Hunt	Comedy, Drama. Based on short stories The Private History of a Campaign That Failed, The War Prayer.
1984	United States	Booker	Stan Lathan	Biography, Drama, Family. Booker T. Washington
1990	United States	Traitor in My House	Nell Cox	Drama, Family. Elizabeth Van Lew
1990	United States	The Rose and the Jackal	Jack Gold	Adventure, Drama, Romance, War, Western. American Civil War spies, Allan Pinkerton, Rose O'Neal Greenhow
1991	United States	The Perfect Tribute	Jack Bender	Drama. Gettysburg Address
1991	United States	Ironclads	Delbert Mann	War. Battle of Hampton Roads
1992	United States	Lincoln and the War Within	Calvin Skaggs	Drama. Abraham Lincoln, William H. Seward.
1993	United States	For Love and Glory	Roger Young	Drama.
1993	United States	Class of '61	Gregory Hoblit	Action, Drama.
1995	United States	Tad	Rob Thompson	Drama, History. Tad Lincoln
1996	United States	Andersonville	John Frankenheimer	Drama, History, War. Andersonville Prison
1998	United States	The Day Lincoln Was Shot	John Gray	Biography, Drama, History. Based on the book The Day Lincoln Was Shot. Assassination of Abraham Lincoln
1998	United States	The Tempest	Jack Bender	Drama. Based on the play The Tempest.
1999	United States	The Hunley	John Gray	Action, Drama, History, War, Western. Sinking of USS Housatonic
2000	United States	Enslavement: The True Story of Fanny Kemble	James Keach	Biography, Drama. Fanny Kemble
2004	Canada	The Unsexing of Emma Edmonds	Pepita Ferrari	Biography. Sarah Emma Edmonds
2005	United States	The Colt	Yelena Lanskaya	Action, Drama, History, War, Western. Based on the short story Zherebyonok.
2005	United States; Thailand; Germany	Mysterious Island	Russell Mulcahy	Action, Adventure, Fantasy, Sci-Fi. Based on a novel The Mysterious Island.
2006	United States	Ambrose Bierce: Civil War Stories	Don Maxwell; Brian James Egen	Biography, Drama, History, War. Based on stories One Kind Of Officer, Story Of A Conscience, An Occurrence At Owl Creek Bridge.
2006	United States	No Retreat from Destiny: The Battle That Rescued Washington	Kevin Hershberger	Action, Drama, War. Valley campaigns of 1864
2014	United States	Deliverance Creek	Jon Amiel	Drama, Romance, Western.
2015	United States	Point of Honor	Randall Wallace	Drama.
2016	United States	Rebel	Luke Cook	Action, Adventure, Romance, Western. Based on a novel The Starbuck Chronicles.

== Television series ==
Year	Country	Title (Alternative title)	Director	Subject
1917	United States	The Lincoln Cycle	John M. Stahl	Biography, Drama, History. Abraham Lincoln
1938	United States	The Lone Ranger	William Witney; John English	Drama, Family, Western. Based on the radio program The Lone Ranger.
1950-51	United Kingdom	Little Women		Drama, Family, Romance. Based on a novel Little Women.
1951	United States	Mysterious Island	Spencer Gordon Bennet	Action, Family, Sci-Fi. Based on a novel The Mysterious Island.
1957-58	United States	The Gray Ghost	Hollingsworth Morse	Adventure, War, Western. John S. Mosby
1958	United Kingdom	Little Women	Alan Bromly	Drama, Family, Romance. Based on a novel Little Women.
1961	United States	The Americans		Action, War. Based on a novel The Valiant Virginians.
1970	United Kingdom	Little Women	Paddy Russell	Drama, Family, Romance. Based on a novel Little Women.
1974-76	United States	Lincoln	George Schaefer	Biography, Drama, History, War. Abraham Lincoln
1976-79	United States	How the West Was Won		Drama, Western.
1977	United States	Roots	Marvin J. Chomsky; John Erman; David Greene; Gilbert Moses	Biography, Drama, History, War. Based on a novel Roots: The Saga of an American Family.
1978-9	United States	Centennial		Action, Adventure, Drama, Romance, Western. Based on a novel Centennial.
1978	United States	Little Women	David Lowell Rich	Drama, Family, Romance. Based on a novel Little Women.
1979	United States	Little Women		Drama. Based on a novel Little Women.
1980	United States	Beulah Land	Virgil W. Vogel; Harry Falk	Drama. Based on the novels Beulah Land, and Look Away, Beulah Land.
1981	United States	Manions of America	Joseph Sargent; Charles S. Dubin	Drama.
1982	United States	The Blue and the Gray	Andrew V. McLaglen	Drama, History, War.
1985-94	United States	North and South		Drama, History, Romance, War. Based on a novels North and South.
1986	United States	Dream West	Dick Lowry	Biography, Drama, Western. Based on a novel Dream West.
1988	United States	Lincoln	Lamont Johnson	Drama, History, War. Based on a novel Lincoln. Abraham Lincoln
1991	United States	Son of the Morning Star	Mike Robe	Biography, History, Western. Based on the book Son of the Morning Star.
1993	United States	Alex Haley's Queen	John Erman	Biography, Drama, Romance, War. Based on a novel Queen: The Story of an American Family.
1994	United States	Oldest Living Confederate Widow Tells All	Ken Cameron	Drama, War. Based on a novel Oldest Living Confederate Widow Tells All.
1995	Canada; New Zealand	Mysterious Island		Adventure, Drama, Sci-Fi. Based on a novel The Mysterious Island.
1998	United States	The Secret Diary of Desmond Pfeiffer	Matthew Diamond	Comedy, History. Abraham Lincoln
2012	United States	Hatfields & McCoys	Kevin Reynolds	Drama, History, Romance, War, Western. Hatfield–McCoy feud
2012-13	United States	Copper		Action, Drama.
2013-14	United States	1863	Robert Tinnell	History.
2015-16	United States	To Appomattox	Mikael Salomon	Biography, Drama, History, War.
2016	United States	Roots	Bruce Beresford; Thomas Carter; Phillip Noyce; Mario Van Peebles	Drama, War. Based on a novel Roots: The Saga of an American Family.
2016-17	United States	Mercy Street		Drama, History. Based on the memoir Adventures of an Army Nurse in Two Wars.
2017	United Kingdom; United States; Ireland	Little Women	Vanessa Caswill	Drama. Based on a novel Little Women.
2024	United States	Manhunt	Carl Franklin; John Dahl; Eva Sørhaug	Drama, History, Thriller. Based on the book Manhunt: The 12-Day Chase for Lincoln's Killer. John Wilkes Booth, Edwin Stanton, Assassination of Abraham Lincoln.
2024	United States	The Gray House	Roland Joffé	Drama. American Civil War spies

== Documentaries ==
- The Battle of Gettysburg (1955)
- The Civil War by Ken Burns (first broadcast on PBS from September 23 to Thursday, September 27, 1990)
- The Great Battles of the Civil War (TV series 1994)
- Sherman's March (1986)
- Civil War Combat (TV Series 2000-2003)
- Gettysburg: 3 days of Destiny (2004)
- 10 Days That Unexpectedly Changed Women (2006), TV, recounting the Battle of Antietam
- Lincoln and Lee at Antietam: The Cost of Freedom (2006)
- The End of the Civil War (2009, History Channel): a collection of four separately produced and aired films sold as a single title: Sherman's March (2007), April 1865 (2003), The Hunt for John Wilkes Booth (2007), and Stealing Lincoln's Body (2009). The collection is also known as The Last Days of the Civil War.
- Gettysburg (broadcast on History in 2011)
