= The Heart of Maryland =

The Heart of Maryland may refer to:

- The Heart of Maryland (play), 1895 play directed by David Belasco
  - The Heart of Maryland (1915 film), 1915 film based on the play, directed by Herbert Brenon
  - The Heart of Maryland (1921 film), 1921 film based on the play, directed by Tom Terriss
  - The Heart of Maryland (1927 film), 1927 film based on the play, directed by Lloyd Bacon
