= The Hunley =

Made for tv movie

- VHS cover
- Genre: Historical drama
- Screenplay by: John Gray
- Story by: John Fasano; John Gray
- Directed by: John Gray
- Starring: Armand Assante; Donald Sutherland; Alex Jennings; Christopher Bauer; Gerry Becker
- Music by: Randy Edelman
- Country of origin: United States
- Original language: English

Production
- Executive producers: Andrew Adelson; Tracey Alexander
- Producer: Mitch Engel
- Cinematography: John Thomas
- Editor: Maryann Brandon
- Running time: 94 minutes
- Production company: Adelson Entertainment

Original release
- Network: TNT
- Release: July 11, 1999

The Hunley is a 1999 American historical drama television film written and directed by John Gray, from a story by Gray and John Fasano. The film stars Armand Assante, Donald Sutherland, Alex Jennings, Michael Dolan, and Christopher Bauer, and is based on the true story of the H. L. Hunley submarine and the action of 17 February 1864. It aired on TNT on July 11, 1999.

== Plot ==
Horace L. Hunley takes his ship, the H.L. Hunley, out in the Charleston, South Carolina harbor and it sinks with all hands. As the blockade still needs to be broken, General P. G. T. Beauregard has the ship raised and puts George E. Dixon in charge. He starts looking for a crew and after some difficulty finally finds enough volunteers to man it. However, the crew do not all get along with each other.

Dixon flashes back to the Battle of Shiloh, where a gold coin given to him by his wife (who was later killed in a steamboat explosion caused by a drifting mine) deflected a bullet and saved his life. They take the ship down and sit on the bottom to see how long they can stay down and almost get stuck. The U.S. Navy is warned about the sub. The crew votes that if after an attack they are stuck on the bottom, they will open the valves, flooding the ship, rather than suffocate. They go out to attack the USS Wabash, but the attack fails. Following the warning, the ship has draped metal chain netting over the side. Also the rope which was attached to the torpedo they were to release under the ship gets loose and becomes entangled in the propeller. It has to be cut loose while sailors on the Wabash shoot at the Hunley. Beauregard proposes putting the torpedo at the end of a long spar. The USS Housatonic is ordered to change its position in the harbor and always be ready to steam, meaning it cannot hang metal netting over the side. The Hunley's second in command, Lt. Alexander, is ordered to Mobile, Alabama, and a young soldier who had been volunteering to join the crew is allowed to do so.

On February 17, 1864, the CSS H. L. Hunley sails out and attacks the USS Housatonic. The torpedo is rammed into the side of the ship. It blows up and the Housatonic is the first ship ever sunk by a sub. A bullet from the ship breaks a window in the conning tower and wounds Dixon. The explosion opens the seams on the Hunley and it takes on water. It settles to the bottom and the crew cannot release the ballast or pump the ship. As agreed the crew opens the valves and the ship floods, killing the entire crew. General Beauregard attends a memorial service in Charleston for the Hunley and her crew, while inside the flooded submarine, Dixon sees a vision of his wife, welcoming him into the afterlife.

== Cast ==
- Armand Assante as Lt. George E. Dixon
- Donald Sutherland as Gen. P. G. T. Beauregard
- Alex Jennings as Lt. William Alexander
- Christopher Bauer as Simkins
- Gerry Becker as Capt. Pickering
- Michael Dolan as Becker
- Sebastian Roche as Collins
- Michael Stuhlbarg as Wicks
- Jeff Mandon as Miller
- Frank Vogt as Ronald White
- Jack Baun as Ridgeway
- Kevin Robertson as Carlson
- Caprice Benedetti as Dixon’s wife
