= Robert F. Flemming Jr. =

African-American inventor (1839–1919)

- Born: July , 1839; Baltimore, Maryland, U.S.
- Died: February 23, 1919 (aged 79); Melrose, Massachusetts, U.S.
- Occupations: Guitar manufacturer, inventor, music teacher
- Known for: Invention of guitar-like instrument "Euphonica", spotting the H.L. Hunley
- Spouse: Eleanora Flemming
- Military career
- Burial place: Wyoming Cemetery, Melrose, Massachusetts
- Other names: Fleming, Flemmings
- Allegiance: Union
- Service years: 1863–1865
- Rank: Landsman
- Unit: 25th Infantry Regiment Massachusetts

Robert Francis Flemming Jr. (July 1839 – February 23, 1919) was an American inventor and Union sailor in the American Civil War. He was the first crew member aboard the USS Housatonic to spot the H.L. Hunley before it sank the USS Housatonic. The sinking of USS Housatonic is renowned as the first sinking of an enemy ship in combat by a submarine.

== Biography ==
=== Early life ===
Robert F. Flemming Jr. was born a free African-American in Baltimore, Maryland, in July 1839, the eldest child of Robert F. Flemming Sr., a baker, and Mary Jane (Holland) Flemming. By 1850 the family had moved to Cambridge, Massachusetts, and Flemming (age 12) had four new siblings: John (age 11), Catherine (age 5), George (age 2), and Mary (an infant). Flemming Sr. died soon after, and Mrs. Flemming opened a boarding house in Cambridge while the three oldest children went out to work.

=== Service in the Civil War ===
Robert Flemming was working in New York City as a marble cutter when he enlisted in the United States Navy on May 14, 1863. He was rated as landsman (rank), the equivalent of the current naval rating of seaman recruit. His first posting was to the USS Wyoming (1859) the following June; he was present when the sloop engaged the naval forces of the Japanese Empire at the Naval battle of Shimonoseki on July 16 of that year.

=== Attack on USS Housatonic ===
The following October, Flemming transferred to the sloop of war USS Housatonic (1861), which was sent to join the blockade of Southern seaports as part of the South Atlantic Blockading Squadron. On the evening of February 17, 1864, Flemming was on watch when he noticed a strange object in the water about 400 feet off the starboard bow. He alerted the officer of the guard, who dismissed the object as a log. "Queer-looking log," Flemming replied. Taking a closer look, he soon realized that the "log" wasn't floating with the tide, but was actually coming at a high speed toward the Housatonic. Shouting that there was a torpedo approaching the ship, Flemming alerted the rest of the crew, who started to get the Housatonic under way. However, it was too late; there was an explosion and, within five minutes, the Housatonic sank in 25 feet of water with a loss of five crewmen. The crew immediately began climbing the rigging or entering life boats as the sloop began to sink; once it hit bottom, however, the masts and rigging were still above the water, and Flemming and others hung on for forty-five minutes until help arrived.

The Housatonic was destroyed by the Confederate States Navy's secret weapon, the submarine H. L. Hunley under the command of Lieutenant George E. Dixon with a crew of seven volunteers. The Hunley thus was the first submarine to sink a warship in combat. From his vantage point in the rigging, Flemming noted a blue light to the starboard of the Housatonic, which was later surmised to have been the crew of the Hunley's prearranged signal to friendly forces to light bonfires to guide the crew home. However, the Hunley never returned, leading to one of the great mysteries of the Civil War.

=== Invention and music career ===
Flemming finished his naval service on the gunboat USS E. B. Hale after June 1865 and subsequently returned to Massachusetts, living and working in Cambridge, Massachusetts, and Boston, Massachusetts, where he went into business as a guitar manufacturer and music teacher.

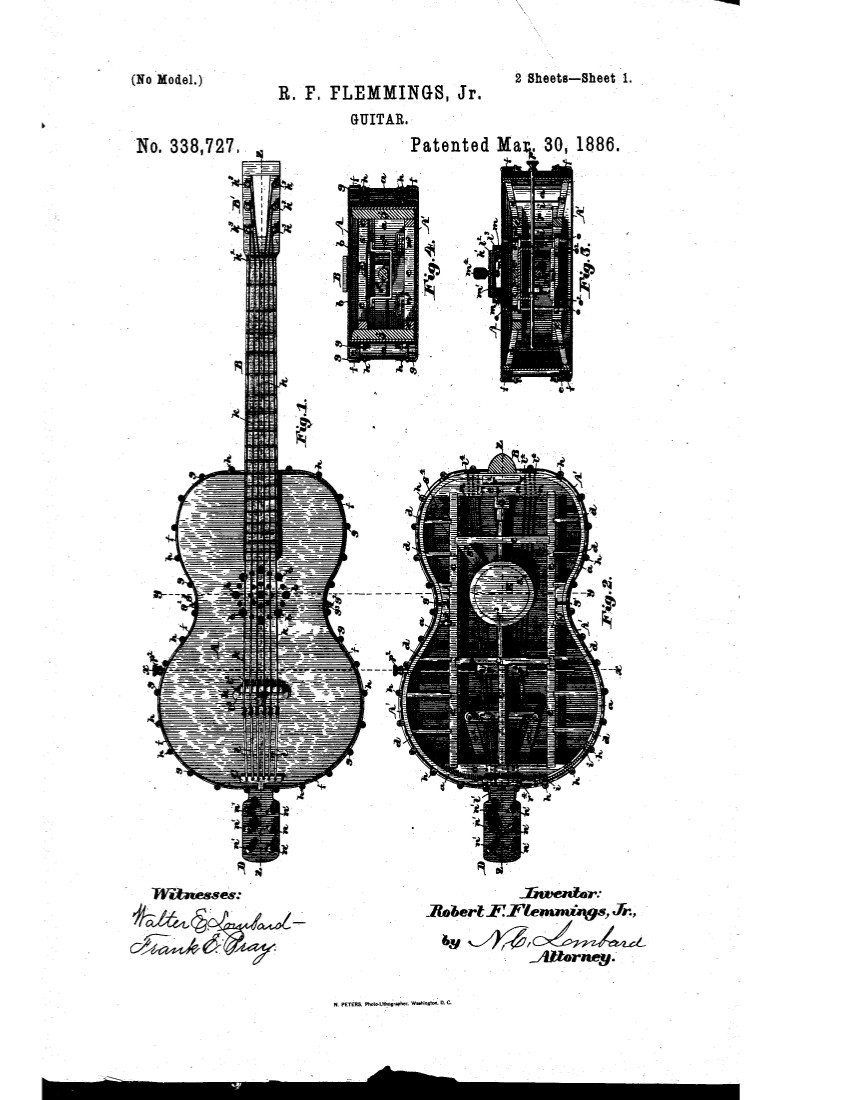
Illustration of a Euphonica

Flemming invented a guitar he called the "Euphonica" that he believed would produce a louder and more resonant sound than a traditional guitar. The U.S. Patent Office granted Flemming a patent (no. 338,727) on March 30, 1886. He also received a Canadian patent (no. 26,398) on April 5, 1887. Flemming then went into business for himself, building and demonstrating his musical instruments from a storefront on Washington Street in Boston.

After 1900, Robert Flemming retired to his home in Melrose, Massachusetts, where he continued to give lessons and perform at various functions. In 1907, he composed a "National Funeral Hymn" dedicated to the Grand Army of the Republic

A member of the Grand Army of the Republic Post no. 30 in Cambridge, Massachusetts, Robert Flemming died in February 1919.
