= USS Dixon =

L. Y. Spear-class submarine tender

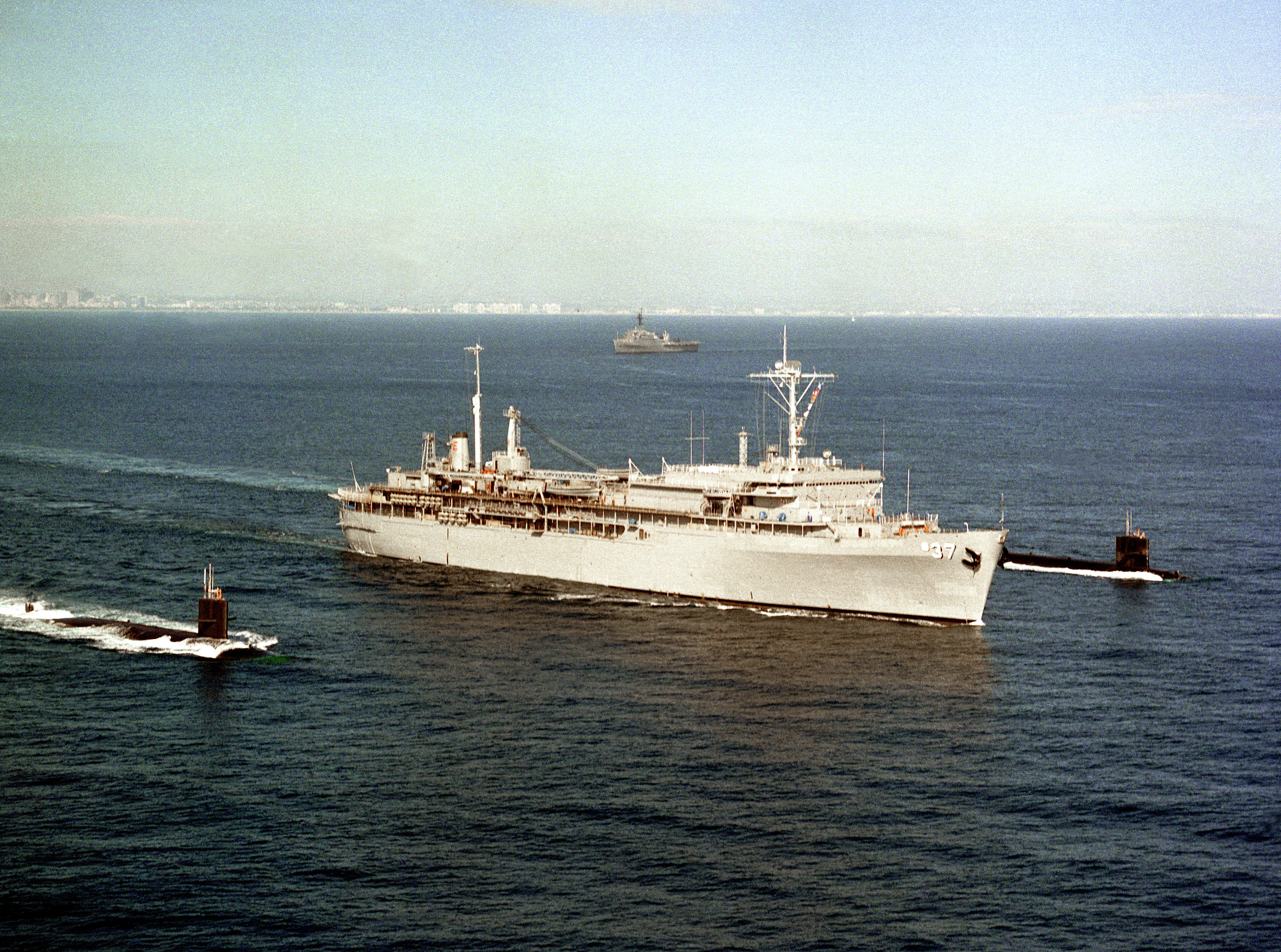
- USS Dixon (AS 37)

History

United States
- Name: USS Dixon (AS-37)
- Namesake: George E. Dixon
- Ordered: 20 April 1966
- Builder: General Dynamics Corp., Fore River Shipyard, Quincy, Massachusetts
- Laid down: 7 September 1967
- Launched: 20 June 1970
- Acquired: 7 May 1971
- Commissioned: 7 August 1971
- Decommissioned: 15 December 1995
- Stricken: 18 March 1996
- Motto: Ready for Service
- Fate: Disposed of in support of Fleet training exercise, 21 July 2003

General characteristics
- Class & type: L.Y. Spear-class submarine tender
- Displacement: 22,640 tons
- Length: 644 ft (196 m)
- Beam: 85 ft (26 m)
- Draft: 57 ft (17 m)
- Propulsion: steam turbine engine, 1 propeller
- Speed: 20 knots
- Complement: 1,338
- Armament: two 5-inch, four 0.5 in (12.7 mm) guns

USS Dixon (AS-37) was an L. Y. Spear-class submarine tender, in service to the United States Navy from 1971 through 1995. Dixon was named for George E. Dixon, commander of the Confederate submarine H. L. Hunley.

Dixon was laid down by General Dynamics Corp, Fore River Shipyard at Quincy, Massachusetts, on 7 September 1967. She was launched on 20 June 1970 and commissioned on 7 August 1971 at Norfolk Naval Shipyard, sponsored by Mrs. Paul Masterson, the wife of retired Vice Adm. Paul Masterson, USN, and commanded by Capt. D.S. Boyd, USN.

In November 1978, two female officers, Ensigns Roberta McIntyre and Macushla McCormick, boarded Dixon. They were part of the first group of female officers to serve aboard U.S. Navy ships starting in November 1978. Ensign McIntyre later became the first woman to qualify as a Surface Warfare Officer. Dixon was decommissioned 15 December 1995 and struck 18 March 1996. She was sunk as a target in the Atlantic Ocean during a fleet training exercise 21 July 2003 over 580 km (360 mi) southeast of Charleston, South Carolina (USA) at 31°16′17.9″N 73°57′46.2″W in a depth of 5130 m (2805 fathoms).
