= Civil War Combat =

American television series

Civil War Combat is a television series hosted by the History Channel from 1999 to 2003. It described battles of the American Civil War in a graphic, realistic level. Veteran voice actor Tony Jay served as narrator. Historical reenactment was used to visualize the events.

One of the objectives of the series was to associate people with lesser known regiments and commands. Another one was to provide little known facts of the fields of conflict and to also give an accurate portrayal of the bloodiness of the fighting of the day.

== Episodes ==
S01E01	The Wheatfield at Gettysburg	Battle of Gettysburg
S01E02	The Bloody Lane at Antietam	Battle of Antietam
S01E03	The Hornets Nest at Shiloh	Battle of Shiloh
S01E04	The Tragedy at Cold Harbor	Battle of Cold Harbor
S02E01	The Battle of First Manassas	First Battle of Bull Run
S02E02	The Battle of Fredericksburg	Battle of Fredericksburg
S02E03	The Battle of Chancellorsville	Battle of Chancellorsville
S02E04	Little Round Top at Gettysburg	Battle of Gettysburg
S03E01	Culp's Hill at Gettysburg	Battle of Gettysburg
S03E02	The Battle of Chickamauga	Battle of Chickamauga
S03E03	The Crater at Petersburg	Battle of the Crater at Petersburg.
S03E04	The Battle of Franklin	Battle of Franklin

== See also ==
- List of films and television shows about the American Civil War
