= Gerry Becker =

American actor (1951–2019)

- Born: April 11, 1951; St. Louis, Missouri, U.S
- Died: April 13, 2019 (aged 68)
- Occupation: Actor
- Years active: 1984–2008
- Spouse: Lucy

Gerry Becker (April 11, 1951 – April 13, 2019) was an American theatre, film, and television actor.

== Early life ==
Born in St. Louis, Missouri to a family of priests, Becker studied for the priesthood with Jesuits for three years before dropping out. He earned a bachelor's degree in English from the University of Missouri and a master's degree in theatre from Saint Louis University.

== Career ==
He was associated with Remains Theatre and Steppenwolf Theatre Company in the Chicago, Illinois area.

He had the lead role in Bernard Slade's Romantic Comedy at Pheasant Run in St. Charles, Illinois in 1981. Mary Yaney of The Herald of Crystal Lake, Illinois noted that he did an "excellent job" as the "self-centered, but loveable writer".

He appeared in a National Jewish Theatre production of Grown Ups by Jules Feiffer in 1987. A review noted, "Becker slices on the cutting edge in everything he does. All the empathy is blanched from the character leaving it less admirable. That is the character, for Becker's piercing performance is just fine".

In 1991, he appeared in Northlight Theatre's production of Ibsen's An Enemy of the People reads, "To his great credit, Gerry Becker, as [Thomas] Stockman, delivers [a] famous outcry with genuine passion and oratorical skill despite being costumed in a bright green tail coat so that he looks like a refugee from A Christmas Carol".

In 1992, he appeared as Mr. Wagner in Raymond J. Barry's Once in Doubt with Remains Theatre Company in Chicago. Variety's review noted that "Becker is a bit too meek as the curious interloper". A review in The Times of Munster, Indiana criticized the production, but praised the acting, noting that Becker and his costar William Petersen "give as good as they get in this bizarre triangle" and that "the trio keep the script taut and still extract a good deal of humor from the dialogue. So even when everything they say seems arbitrary and stilted they grab us with the sheer force of their acting". May found his acting "beautiful".

He performed on Broadway in the Steppenwolf Theatre production of The Song of Jacob Zulu in 1993.

In 1995, he starred in the off-Broadway production of three one-act dark comedy plays, Death Defying Acts, by David Mamet (An Interview), Elaine May (Hotline), and Woody Allen (Central Park West), at the Variety Arts Theatre in New York, Stamford, and Philadelphia. A review of the production's run at Stamford Center read, "Gerry Becker makes Howard a perfect Allen type, a failed writer who is better in the kitchen than in the boudoir". Theatre critic Michael Kuchwara of the Associated Press criticized Mamet's writing but said that Becker "as Cheshire catlike inquisitor, and Paul Guilfoyle [...] lob Mamet's lines back and forth like a couple of tennis pros. Neither man drops the ball". In his review of the production, Vince Canby of The New York Times wrote that Becker's and Paul Guilfoyle's performances in Mamet's play were "acted to dry, caustic perfection" and that in Allen's play that Becker and Guilfoyle were "splendid as the would-be guilty parties in liaisons that inevitably fail". Howard Kissel of Daily News wrote, "Gerry Becker is uproarious as the manic depressive" and "Becker brings a believable intensity to the hotline volunteer in May's play".

In addition to his theatre work, he appeared in many films including Donnie Brasco and Man on the Moon.

== Personal life ==
Becker began drinking in his adolescence but was sober 10 years in 1995.

He had a wife, Lucy, who he met while performing in a show at the Court Theatre.

== Death ==
Becker died on April 13, 2019, due to complications from diabetes.

== Selected filmography ==
=== Film ===
- Men Don't Leave (1990) - Uncle Hugh
- Home Alone (1990) - Officer #1
- Hard Promises (1991) - Minister
- The Public Eye (1992) - Inspector Conklin
- Hoffa (1992) - Business Negotiator
- Rudy (1993) - Father Ted
- Roommates (1995) - Dr. Minceberg
- Die Hard with a Vengeance (1995) - Larry Griffith
- Stonewall (1995) - Mattachine Speaker
- Eraser (1996) - Morehart
- Sleepers (1996) - Forensics Expert
- Extreme Measures (1996) - Dr. Gene Spitelli
- Donnie Brasco (1997) - Dean Blandford FBI
- The Game (1997) - New Member Ted
- Happiness (1998) - Psychiatrist
- A Perfect Murder (1998) - Roger Brill
- Celebrity (1998) - Jay Tepper - Glenwood High Alumnus
- Mystery Men (1999) - Banyon
- Mickey Blue Eyes (1999) - FBI Agent Bob Connell
- Game Day (1999) - Fred Wilson
- Mystery, Alaska (1999) - Players' Union Lawyer
- Story of a Bad Boy (1999) - Mr. Fontaine
- Man on the Moon (1999) - Stanley Kaufman - Andy's Father
- The Cell (2000) - Dr. Barry Cooperman
- Spider-Man (2002) - Maximilian Fargas
- Blood Work (2002) - Mr. Toliver
- Trapped (2002) - Dr. Stein
- Marci X (2003) - Dr. Skellar
- Death of a President (2006) - Leon Blumenthal
- Perfect Stranger (2007) - Jon Kirshenbaum

=== Television films and specials ===
- Meyer, The Killing Floor, PBS, 1984
- Larry, The Imposter, ABC, 1984
- Ed Boyer, Howard Beach: Making a Case for Murder (also known as In the Line of Duty: Howard *Beach:Making a Case for Murder and Skin), NBC, 1989
- Judge O'Neill, In the Shadow of a Killer, NBC, 1992
- Samuel Adler, Legacy of Lies, USA Network, 1992
- Captain Pickering, The Hunley, TNT, 1999
- Ted Tinling, When Billie Beat Bobby (also known as Billie contre Bobby: La bataille des sexes), ABC, 2001
- Walt Rostow, Path to War, HBO, 2002

=== Television episodes ===
- John Sherman, "Snatched," Law & Order, NBC, 1994
- "Our Lady of Cement," The Cosby Mysteries, NBC, 1994
- Mr. Goldman, "Simone Says," NYPD Blue, ABC, 1994
- Max Petrov, "The Skin Trade," The Untouchables, 1994
- Dr. Neal Latham, "Switch," Law & Order, NBC, 1995
- Davidoff, "Fun City," New York News, CBS, 1995
- Arnold Cassell, "Moby Greg," NYPD Blue, ABC, 1996
- Rupert, Cosby, CBS, 1996
- Hub News Attorney, “Sex, Lies and Monkeys,” The Practice, ABC, 1997
- Thomas Robbins, "Nullification," Law & Order, NBC, 1997
- Attorney Stone, "Fools Night Out," Ally McBeal, Fox, 1998
- Atty. For School, “Pursuit of Dignity,” The Practice, ABC, 1998
- Dr. Cosimi, "Three Men and a Little Lady," Spin City, ABC, 1998
- Leo Latimer, New York Undercover, Fox, 1998
- Mr. Bickel, "The Music Man," "The Thin Black Line," The Hughleys, ABC, 2000
- "Unnecessary Roughness," Judging Amy, CBS, 2000
- Dr. Michaels, "Faith," Walker, Texas Ranger, CBS, 2000
- "Blood Money," "Reprise," "Dead End," Angel (also known as Angel: The Series), The WB, 2001 - Nathan Reed
- David Leary, "Blown Away," Philly, ABC, 2001
- Judge Stanton, "Lolita?," "Mothers of the Disappeared," The Guardian, CBS, 2001, 2002
- Chester Glass, "The Greenhouse Effect," The District, CBS, 2002
- Network News President #1, "The Black Vera Wang," The West Wing, NBC, 2002
- Ramus, "Witches in Tights," Charmed, The WB, 2002
- Robert, "Cliff Mantegna," Nip/Tuck, FX Channel, 2003
- "Yankee White," Navy NCIS: Naval Criminal Investigative Service (also known as NCIS and NCIS: *Naval Criminal Investigative Service), CBS, 2003
- "Three Boys and a Gun," The Jury, Fox, 2004
- Defense Attorney Gerard Wills, "Can I Get a Witness?," "Obsession," "Called Home" Law & Order, NBC, 2004, 2005, 2008
