= The Heart of Maryland (1915 film) =

1915 film by Herbert Brenon

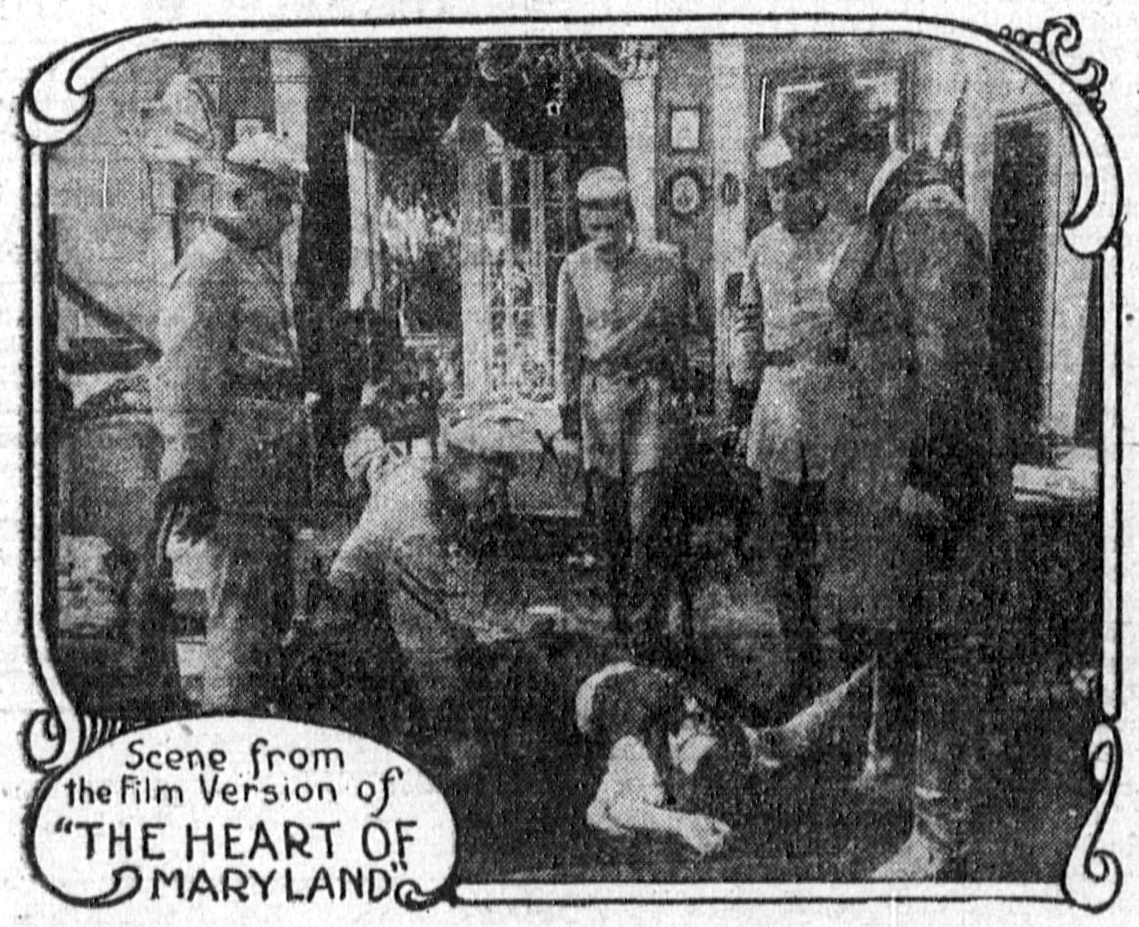
- Scene from the film
- Directed by: Herbert Brenon
- Based on: The Heart of Maryland by David Belasco
- Produced by: Tiffany Film Corporation
- Starring: Mrs. Leslie Carter
- Cinematography: Phil Rosen
- Distributed by: Metro Pictures
- Release date: March 20, 1915
- Running time: 60 minutes
- Country: United States
- Languages: Silent; English intertitles

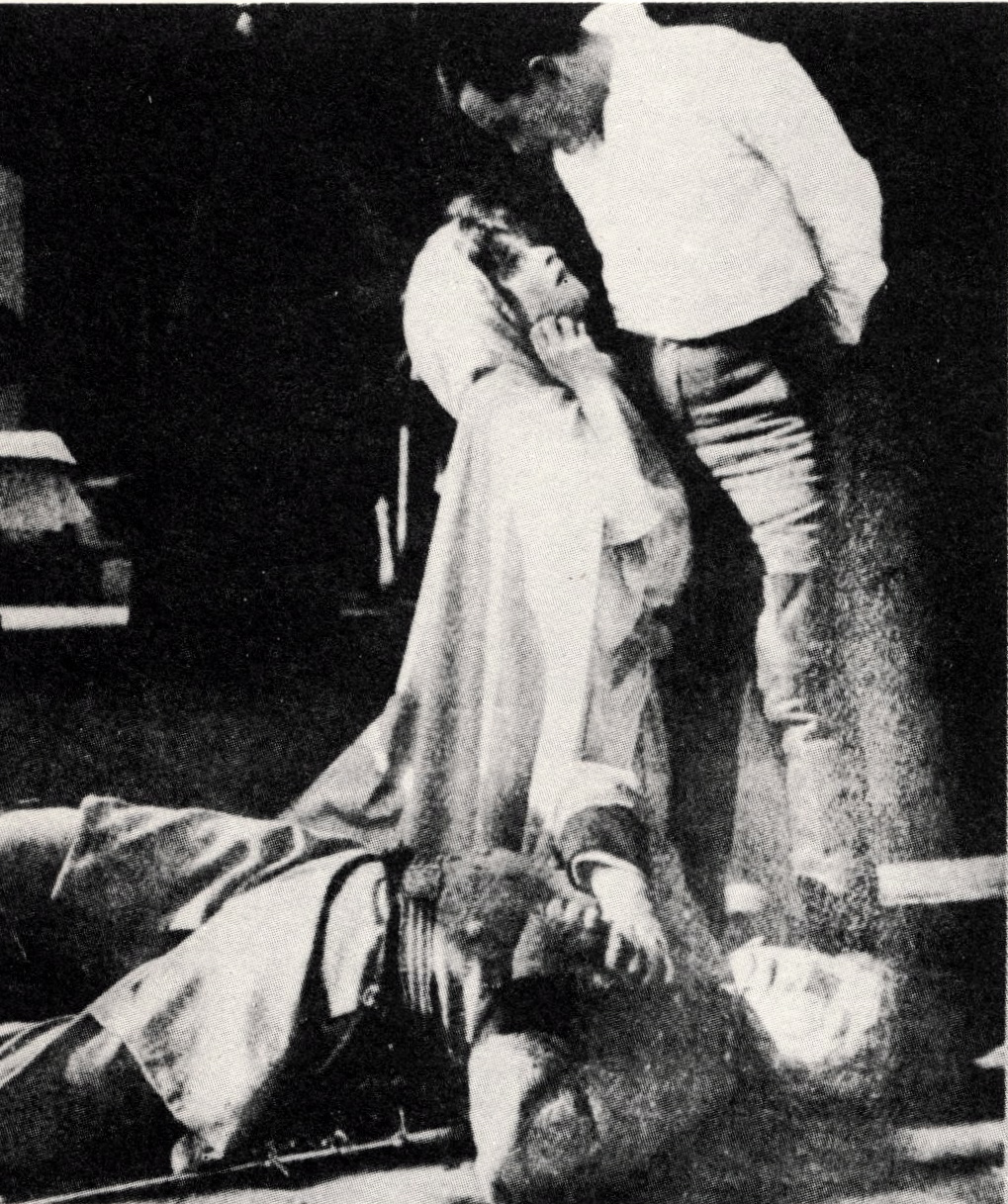
A scene from the 1915 film.

The Heart of Maryland is a lost 1915 silent film drama directed by Herbert Brenon based on David Belasco's play The Heart of Maryland. Mrs. Leslie Carter, who starred in the original play on Broadway in 1895, appeared in the film as the title character.

== Cast ==
- Mrs. Leslie Carter – Maryland Calvert
- William E. Shay – Alan Kendrick
- J. Farrell MacDonald – Colonel Thorpe
- Matt B. Snyder – General Hugh Kendrick
- Raymond Russell – Floyd Calvert
- Marcia Moore – Floyd Calver't Sweetheart
- Vivian Reed – Dolly Grey
- Doris Baker – True Blue
- Herbert Brenon – Lloyd Calvert
- Bert Hadley – Private Boone
- Joseph Hazelton – The Sexton (*as Joe Hazelton)

== See also ==
- The Heart of Maryland (1921)
- The Heart of Maryland (1927)
- List of films and television shows about the American Civil War
