= Dog Jack =

- Directed by: Edward T. McDougal
- Written by: Florence Biros; Edward T. McDougal
- Based on: Dog Jack by Florence W. Biros
- Produced by: Donald Albert
- Starring: Ben Gardner; Louis Gossett Jr.; Ken Craig; Frank Kasy; Eddie Huchro; Kevin Holmen
- Distributed by: Screen Media Films
- Release date: August 29, 2010
- Running time: 113 minutes
- Country: United States
- Language: English

Dog Jack is a 2010 American war drama film based on the book of the same name by Florence W. Biros. The film is inspired by the true story of the mascot of the 102nd Pennsylvania Regiment during the American Civil War.

== Overview ==
The story revolves around a boy named Jed (Benjamin Gardner), who escaped from slavery to join the Union Army during the American Civil War, and was accompanied by his dog Jack (the namesake of the story). The dog became the regiment's mascot during the war.

The film was shot mostly in and around the borough of Darlington, Pennsylvania just outside the city of Pittsburgh. Other locations included North Freedom, Wisconsin, Mt. Pleasant, Iowa, and the suburbs of Chicago, Illinois.

It was an official selection in the St. Louis International Film Festival, Black Harvest Film Festival, San Francisco Black Film Festival, and the International Family Film Festival. It won Best Drama at the San Diego Black Film Festival.

It premiered at Pittsburgh's Soldiers and Sailors National Military Museum and Memorial, which was one of the shooting locations of the film. Dog Jack had a limited theatrical release before releasing nationwide on DVD January 31, 2012 by Screen Media Films, available at Redbox, Family Video, Walmart, Target, Amazon.com, Barnes & Noble, among others.

== See also ==
- Edward T. McDougal
