= The Heart of Maryland (1927 film) =

1927 film

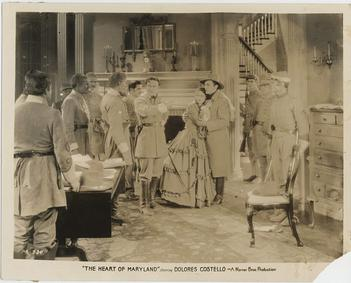
- Directed by: Lloyd Bacon
- Written by: C. Graham Baker (scenario)
- Based on: The Heart of Maryland by David Belasco
- Starring: Dolores Costello; Jason Robards Sr.
- Cinematography: Hal Mohr
- Production company: Warner Bros.
- Distributed by: Warner Bros.
- Release date: July 23, 1927
- Running time: 6 reels 5,868 feet
- Country: United States
- Languages: Silent (English intertitles); Vitaphone (music and effects)

The Heart of Maryland is a 1927 American synchronized sound historical drama film directed by Lloyd Bacon. The film stars Dolores Costello as the title character, and features Jason Robards Sr. It is based on David Belasco's 1895 play The Heart of Maryland performed on Broadway. It was produced and distributed by Warner Bros.

The film is the last silent version of the oft-filmed Victorian story, other versions having been produced in 1915 and 1921.

== Cast ==
- Dolores Costello as Maryland Calvert
- Jason Robards Sr. as Maj. Alan Kendrick
- Warner Richmond as Captain Fulton Thorpe
- Helene Costello as Nancy
- Carroll Nye as Lloyd Calvert
- Charles Edward Bull as Abraham Lincoln
- Erville Alderson as Maj. Gen. Kendrick
- Paul Kruger as Tom Boone
- Walter Rodgers as Gen. U.S. Grant
- Jim Welch as Gen. Robert E. Lee
- Orpha Alba as Mammy
- Myrna Loy as Mulatta
- Harry Northrup as Gen. Joe Hooker
- Nick Cogley as Eli Stanton
- Lew Short as Allan Pinkerton
- Leonard Mellon as Young Stewart
- Madge Hunt as Mrs. Abraham Lincoln
- Charles Force as Col. Lummon
- Francis Ford as Jefferson Davis
- S. D. Wilcox as Gen. Winfield Scott

== Preservation ==
An incomplete print of the film is at the Library of Congress.

== See also ==
- The Heart of Maryland (1915)
- The Heart of Maryland (1921)
- List of early Warner Bros. sound and talking features
- List of films and television shows about the American Civil War
