= The Heart of Maryland (1921 film) =

1921 film

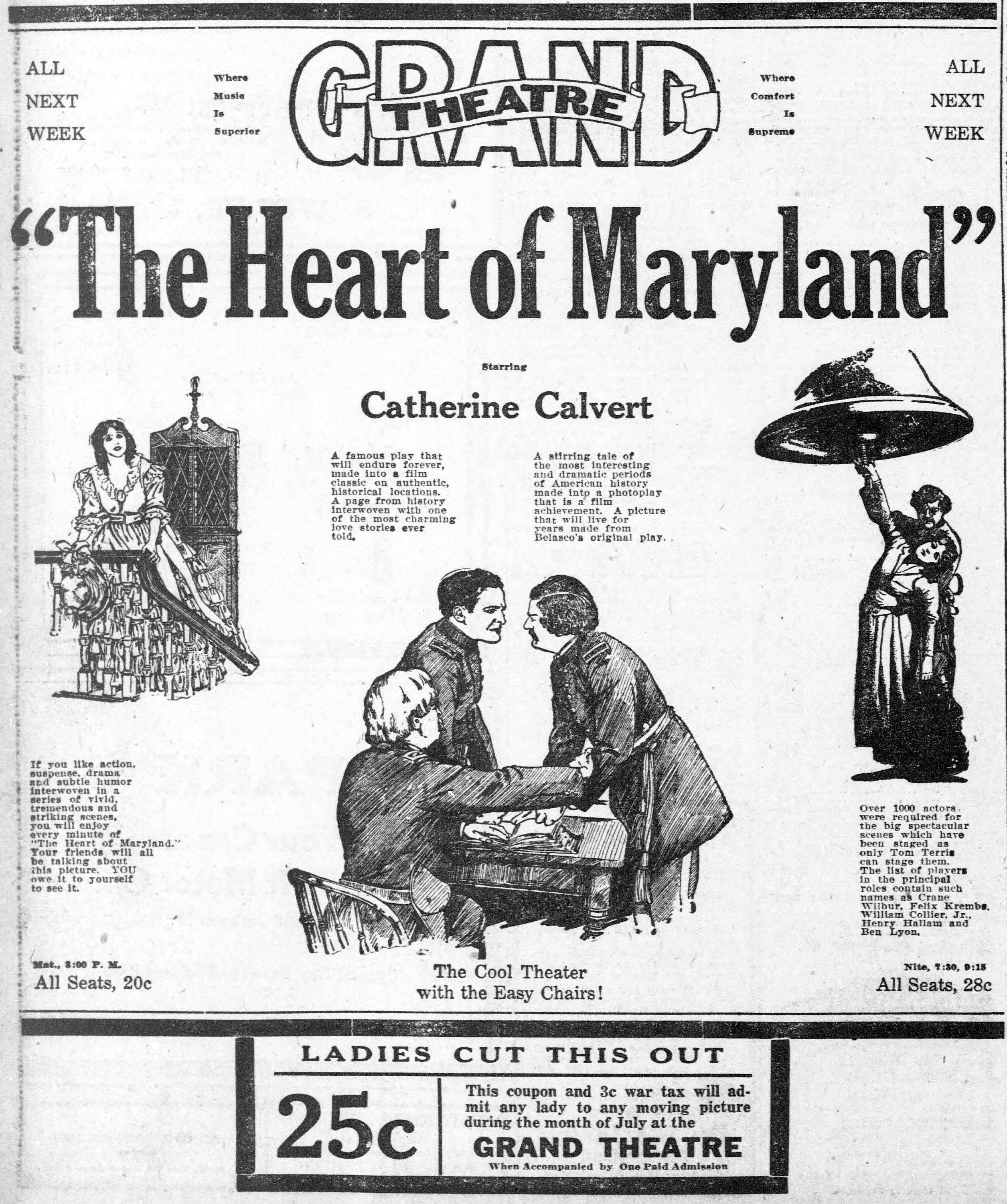
- Newspaper advertisement for the film
- Directed by: Tom Terriss
- Written by: William B. Courtney (scenario)
- Based on: The Heart of Maryland by David Belasco
- Produced by: Vitagraph Company of America
- Starring: Catherine Calvert; Crane Wilbur
- Cinematography: Tom Malloy
- Distributed by: Vitagraph Company of America
- Release date: May 1921
- Running time: 6 reels
- Country: United States
- Language: Silent (English intertitles)

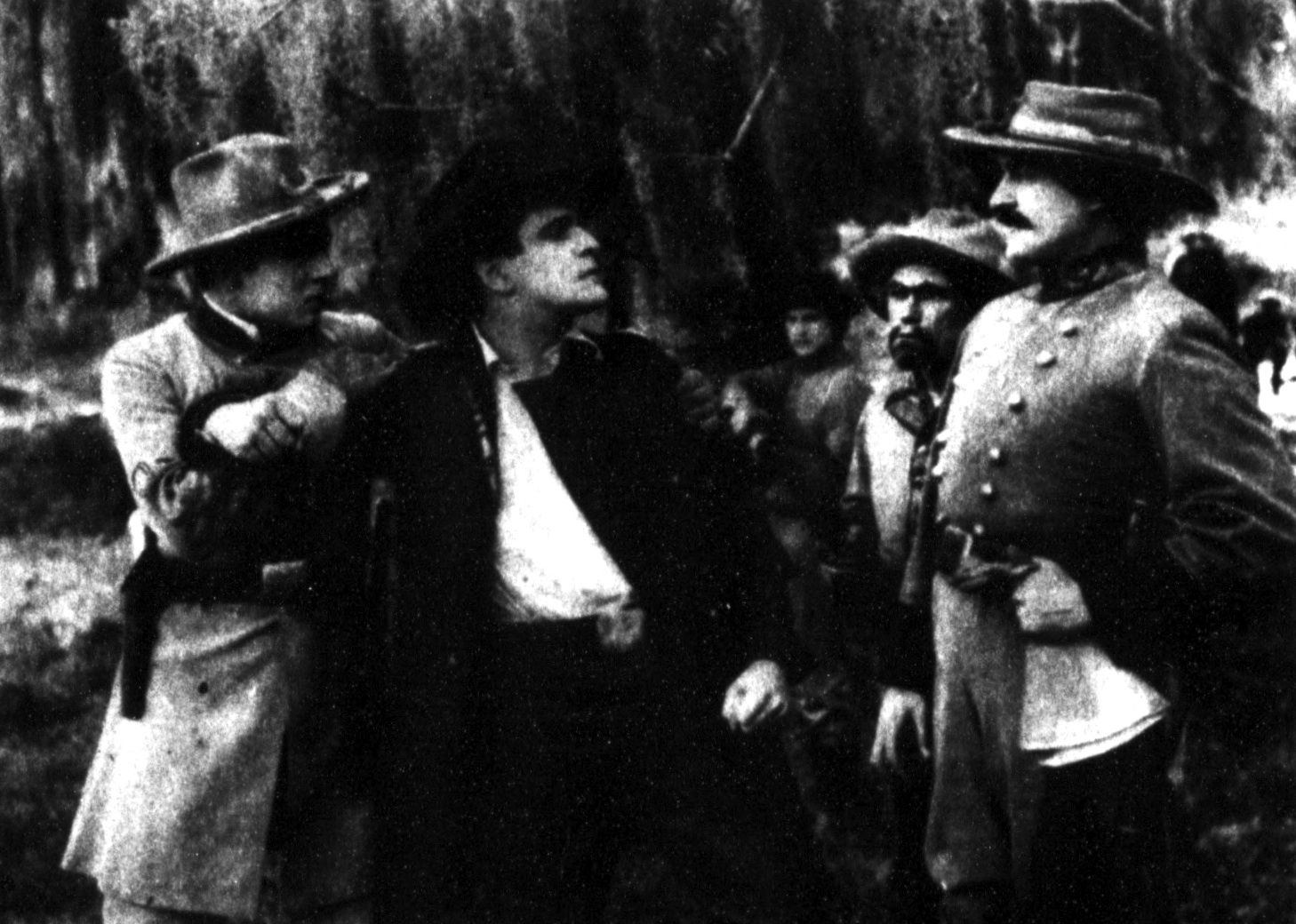
Film still

The Heart of Maryland is a lost 1921 American silent film feature produced and distributed by the Vitagraph Company of America. It is based on David Belasco's 1895 play, The Heart of Maryland.

When Warner Brothers acquired the Vitagraph Studios in 1925, they obtained the screen rights to this property and remade the story in 1927 as The Heart of Maryland with Dolores Costello.

== Cast ==
- Catherine Calvert as Maryland Calvert
- Crane Wilbur as Alan Kendrick
- Felix Krembs as Col. Fulton Thorpe
- Ben Lyon as Bob Telfair
- William Collier Jr. as Lloyd Calvert
- Warner Richmond as Tom Boone
- Bernard Siegel as Provost-Sergeant Blount
- Henry Hallam as General Kendrick
- Victoria White as Nanny McNair
- Marguerite Sanchez as Mrs. Claiborne
- Jane Jennings as Mrs. Claiborne

== See also ==
- The Heart of Maryland (1915)
- List of films and television shows about the American Civil War
