= William Waud =

English architect and illustrator (1832–1878)

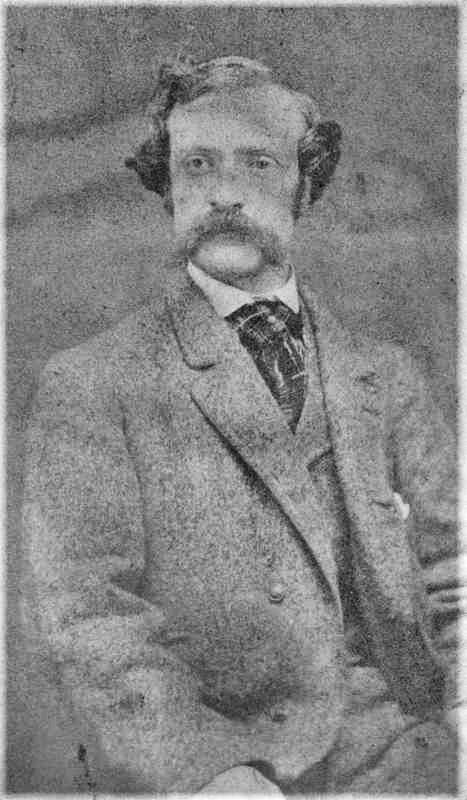
William Waud

William Waud (wɔ:d) (1832 – November 10, 1878) was an English-born architect and illustrator, notable for the sketches he made as an artist correspondent during the American Civil War.

== Career ==
William Waud, trained as an architect in England, was an assistant to Sir Joseph Paxton and worked on the design of the Crystal Palace for the Great Exhibition in 1851. Soon afterward he joined his brother, Alfred Waud in America. William was first employed with Frank Leslie's Illustrated Newspaper. While working as a "Special Artist" for Leslie's, William covered art correspondent assignments in the South, including the inauguration of Jefferson Davis as President of the Confederacy and the bombardment of Fort Sumter. In 1864 Waud joined the staff of Harper's Weekly and worked along with his brother Alfred (also with Harper's) during the Petersburg Campaign. He covered Sherman's March in the south and Lincoln's funeral after the war.

The only known drawing of Waud is a depiction of himself sketching in the rigging of the U.S. Steamer Mississippi in action against confederate gunboats. This detail from Waud's illustration of a naval engagement during Farragut's expedition against New Orleans was published in the May 31, 1862 edition of "Frank Leslie's Illustrated Newspaper".

== Gallery ==
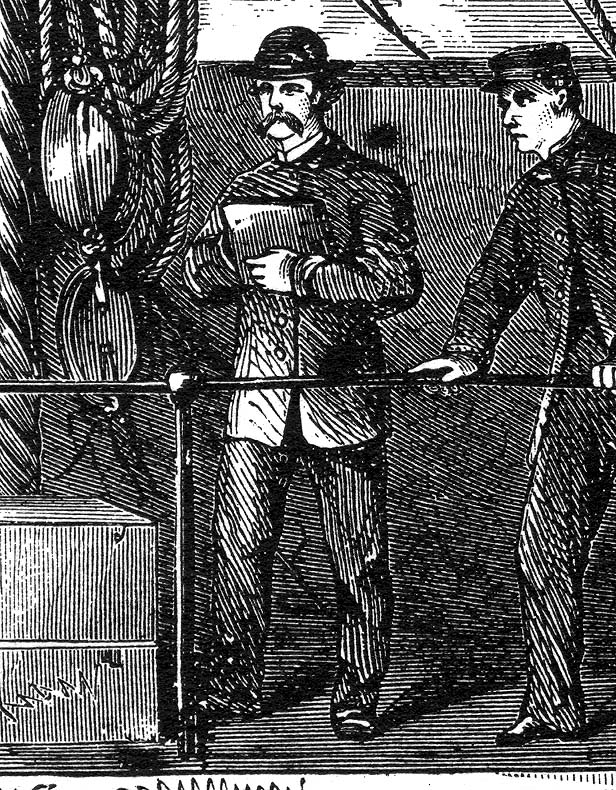
William Waud's depiction of himself sketching, 1862

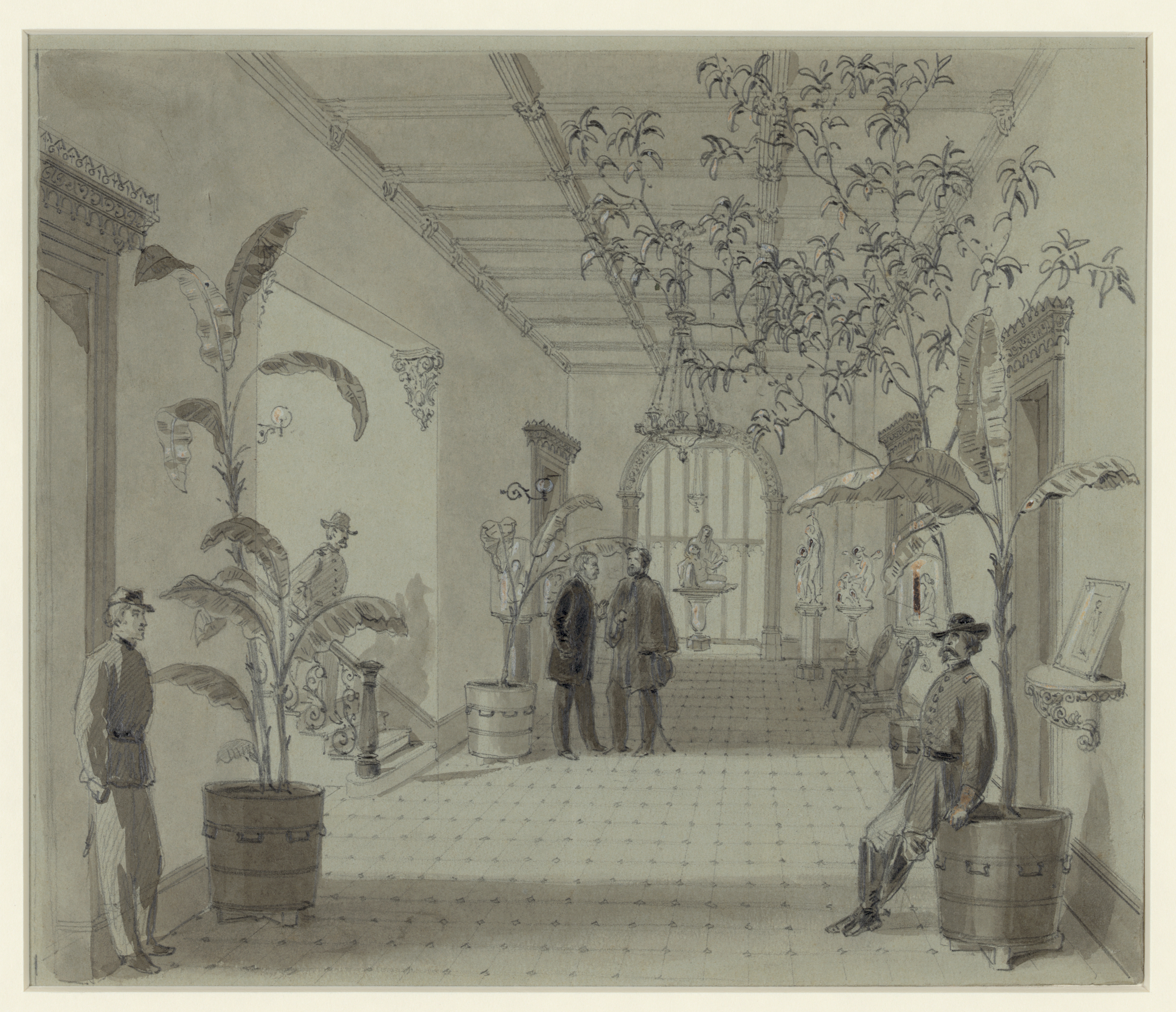
Waud's "Entrance Hall of Mr Chas. Green's_house, Savannah Ga, now occupied as Head Quarters [sic] by Gen Sherman", 1864

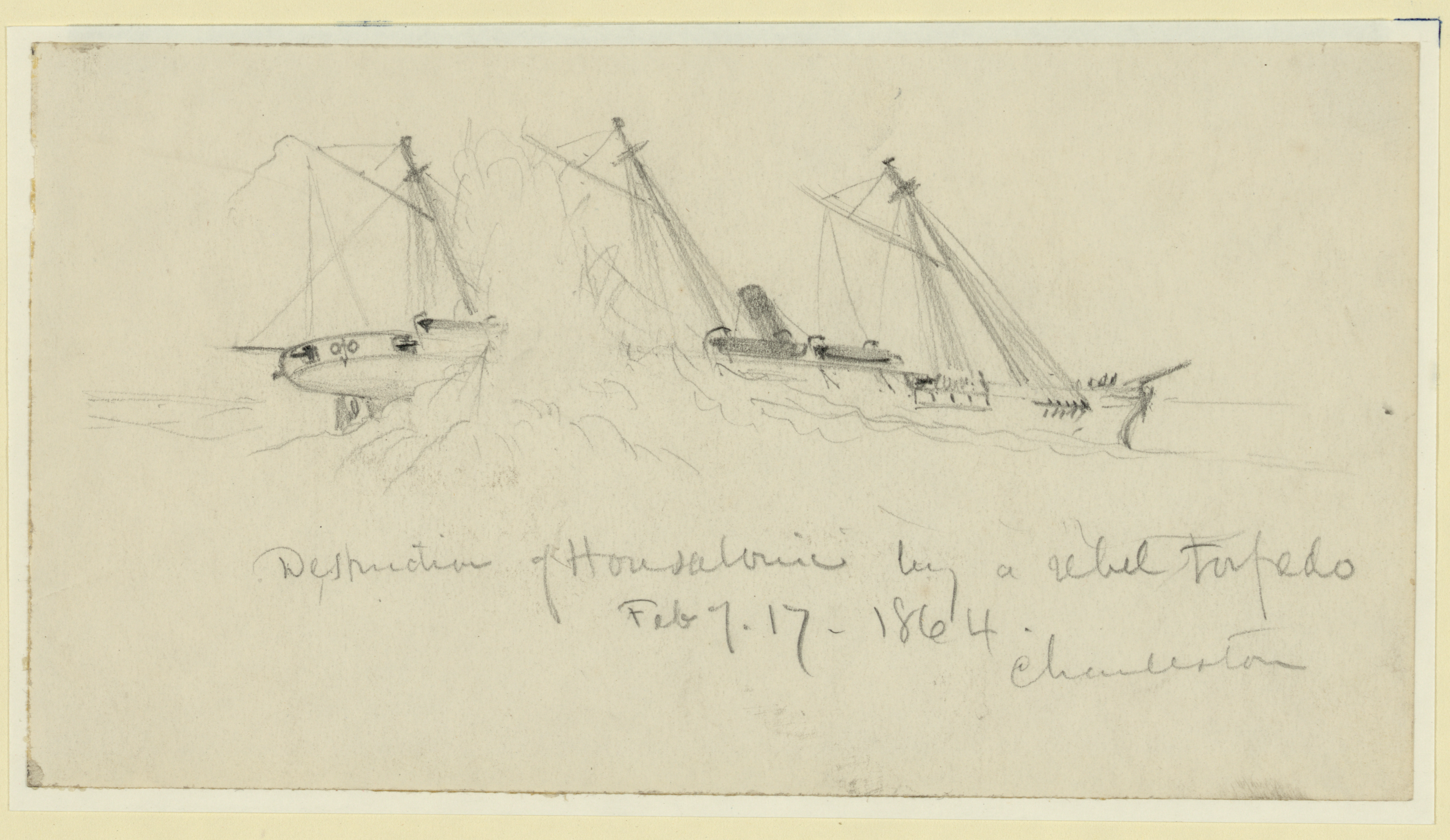
Destruction of Housatonic by a rebel torpedo; sketch 1864

== From Sketch to publication ==
Original sketch of the Burning of McPhersonville, South Carolina by William Waud, left, and as printed in Harper's Weekly, March 4, 1865, right.

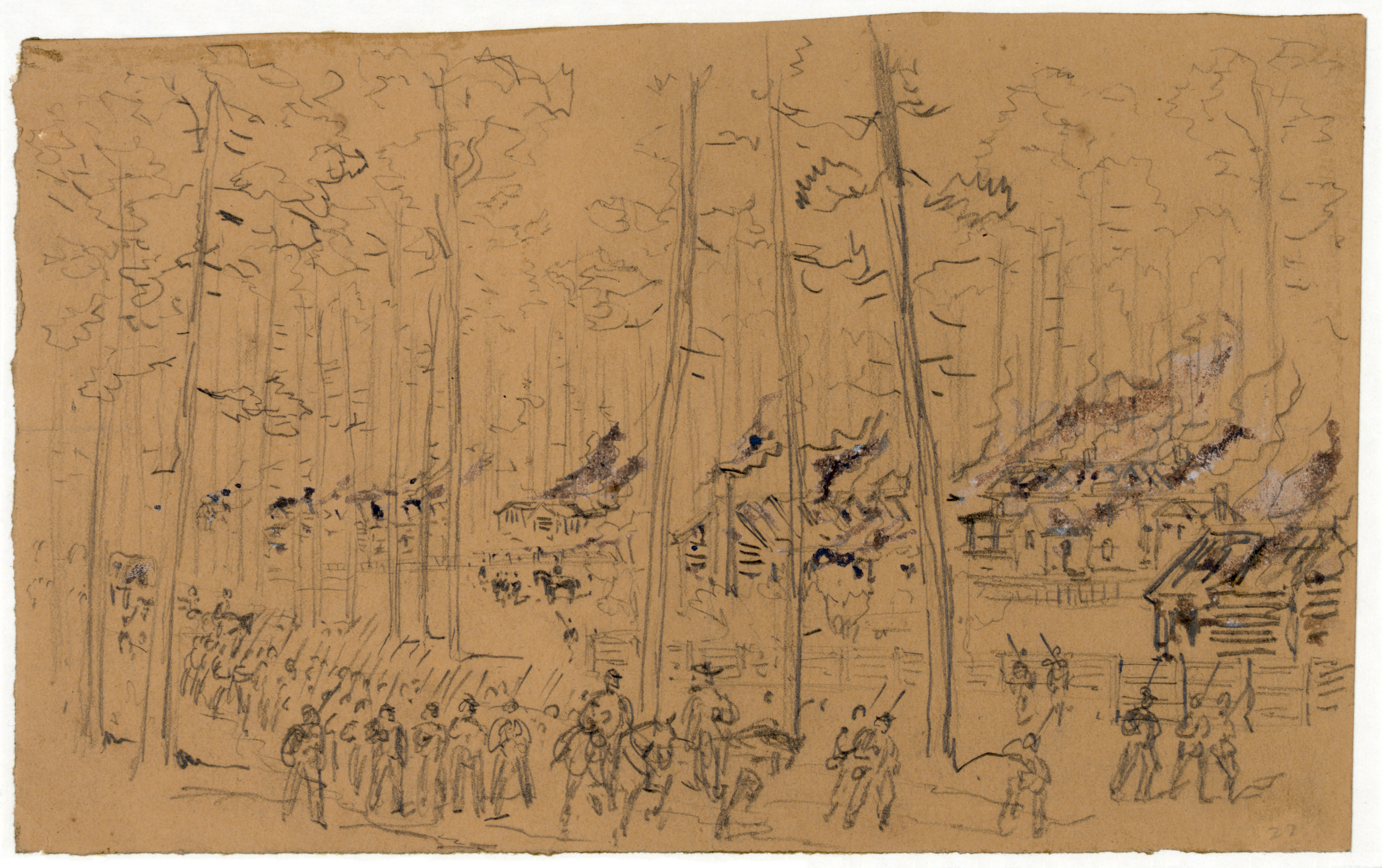

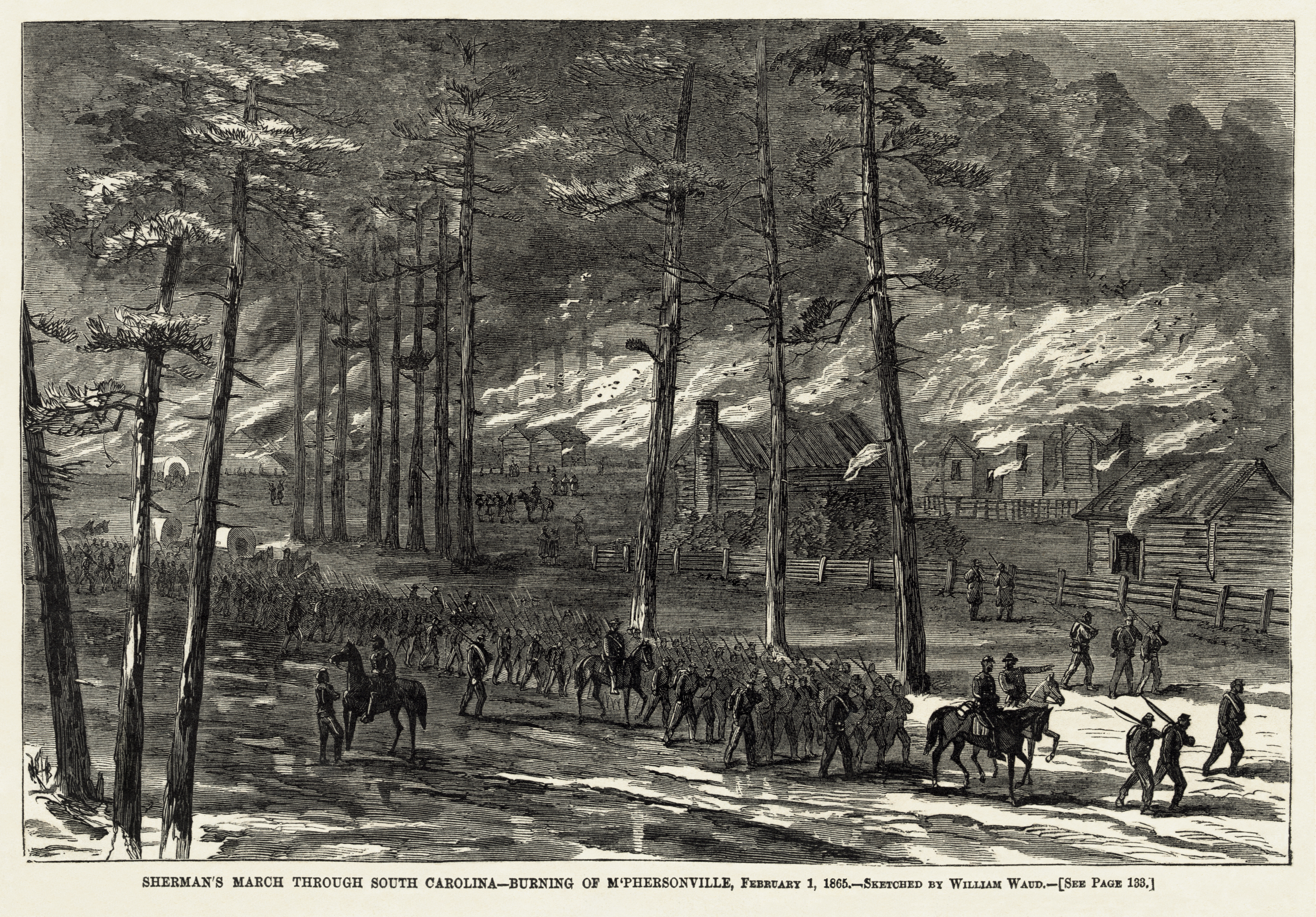

== Collections ==
- Library of Congress
