= Charles W. Pickering (United States Navy officer) =

Union Navy officer (1815–1888)

- Born: December 23, 1815
- Died: February 29, 1888 (aged 72)
- Military career
- Allegiance: Union
- Branch: Union Navy
- Service years: 1822–1867
- Rank: Captain
- Commands: USS Vanderbilt; USS Kearsarge; USS Housatonic
- Conflicts: American Civil War

Commodore Charles Whipple Pickering (December 23, 1815 – February 2, 1888) [his date of birth is also reported as January 23, 1813] was an American officer of the Union Navy during the American Civil War. He is best known for being the captain of USS Housatonic when it was sunk by the submarine CSS Hunley.

== Career ==
Charles Pickering was born in New Hampshire and was a descendant of the aristocratic Pickering family of Massachusetts. His naval career began when he was warranted as a midshipman in 1822 at the age of six. (The reason for his appointment at such a young age was probably to provide financial support to his mother following the death of his father.)

Becoming a lieutenant on December 8, 1838, and a captain on July 16, 1862, his commands included the USS Vanderbilt, Kearsarge and Housatonic.

He was captain of the Housatonic during its sinking on 17 February 1864 at the hands of Confederate States Navy submarine, H.L. Hunley.

After the end of the Civil War he was assigned to the Portsmouth Navy Yard in Kittery, Maine.

He retired from the Navy as a captain in February 1867 and was promoted to commodore on the retired list in December.

He spent his last years in Portsmouth, New Hampshire.

== Dates of rank ==
- Midshipman – 1 May 1822
- Passed midshipman – 10 June 1833
- Lieutenant – 8 December 1838
- Commander – 14 September 1855
- Captain – 16 July 1862
- Retired list – 1 February 1867
- Commodore, retired list – 8 December 1867
- Died – 29 February 1888
