= Edward T. McDougal =

American film director

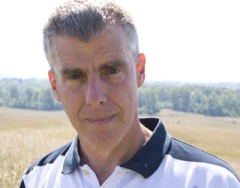
- Occupation: Director/Producer/Professor
- Years active: 1980–present

Edward T. McDougal grew up in Winnetka, Illinois, and graduated from Colorado College in Colorado Springs. He is the son of C. Bouton McDougal, Vice President and General Counsel for R. R. Donnelley and former president of The Chicago Sunday Evening Club, a long-running religious radio (1922) and television (1955) broadcast program, which had world renowned speakers that included Billy Graham, Martin Luther King, Jr., John R.W. Stott, Ben Haden, Lloyd John Ogilvie, Bruce Larson, Stuart Briscoe, Jill Briscoe, Joni Eareckson Tada, Madeleine L'Engle, and Elisabeth Elliot.

McDougal taught junior high English in the northern suburbs of Chicago for five years, and then he went on to begin writing and directing a series of hour-long Christian dramas for film, video and television distribution in over 30 countries. His first film was "Against All Hope" and it starred Michael Madsen in his acting debut. Three of the films -- "Never Ashamed", "Gold Through the Fire", and "Geronimo," were voted “Best Film of the Year” by the 400-member religious film & video trade organization, ICVM, and won awards at international film festivals.

In 1998, McDougal finished production on the 35 mm feature, "The Prodigy", which opened at the Cineplex Odeon in Chicago and was released through Vanguard Video and Blockbuster June 5, 1999.

McDougal Chicago Production Services, a separate equipment rental and production facility located in downtown Chicago, has provided 35 mm camera, grip and lighting packages and support services for many Chicago independent features, television commercials, and music videos which include such productions as "Scenes for the Soul" (Savoy Pictures), "American Reel" (Mariel Hemingway), and "Never Said" (music video, Liz Phair), as well as television specials for PBS.

McDougal initiated and has helped to fund a series of non-profit films aimed at helping urban youth cope with the temptations of using and selling drugs. The series includes the films, "Through the Cracks", and "Crackdown" which won two Emmy awards and is currently distributed to African-American churches, schools, and institutions through Urban Ministries in Chicago.

McDougal has conducted yearly seminars in screenwriting and film production since 1985 at Regent University’s graduate program in cinema television, and has been on staff at YWAM's School of Video in Burtigny, Switzerland (1998-2001), developing and teaching an intensive program in screenwriting and filmmaking. Edward has also taught filmmaking seminars in Nigeria, Hungary, at the Cornerstone Music Festival, and most recently in Russia and Kazakhstan where he spoke at the Christian Broadcasters convention in Moscow (2002) and taught video and writing classes in St. Petersburg (2002) and Alma-Aty, Kazakhstan (2002, 2003 and 2004).

McDougal is former president and chairman of the board of International Christian Visual Media, a worldwide consortium of producers and distributors of Christian film and video that includes such organizations as World Wide Pictures, Gospel Films, and Focus on the Family.

Since 1997, McDougal has administered a judging team for the Religion and Ethics division of the U.S. Film Festival, the largest non-theatrical film festival in the world, has been a judge in the Cinestory Screenwriting Contest, and heads a judging team for the student film category of the Cine Awards.

McDougal has appeared as a panelist on various talk shows such as Geraldo, The Sally Jesse Raphael Show, PM Magazine, and The 700 Club where he has discussed filmmaking and family values.

From 2000 to 2003, McDougal was professor of film and screenwriting at Regent University's Graduate School of Communication. During his tenure at Regent, McDougal's students produced scripts and movies including a film for Joel Freeman, former chaplain of the Washington Wizards titled “Return to Glory,” which received worldwide distribution.

In 2008 and 2009, McDougal taught a film production workshop in the Tiltan Graphic Design College in Haifa, Israel through United Israel Media. UIM is an organization of local media producers that has its roots in the Jewish Messianic "Or haCarmel Congregation" of Haifa. This organization is a name that seeks to unite different media initiatives in Israel.

In 2010, McDougal's feature film, Dog Jack, a story about the adventures of an escaped slave boy and his dog during the American Civil War, premiered in Pittsburgh at the Soldiers and Sailors Hall. It was accepted into 6 film festivals across the country, including the St. Louis International Film Festival, and won Best Drama at the San Diego Black Film Festival. In 2011, it had a limited theatrical release, and in 2012 came out on DVD and streaming at Redbox, Netflix, Amazon.com, Walmart, and other outlets.

McDougal currently lives in Northfield with his wife Nevila, and children Eddie, Emilia, and Ben where he is working on his newest feature film.
