= The Heart of Maryland (play) =

Play

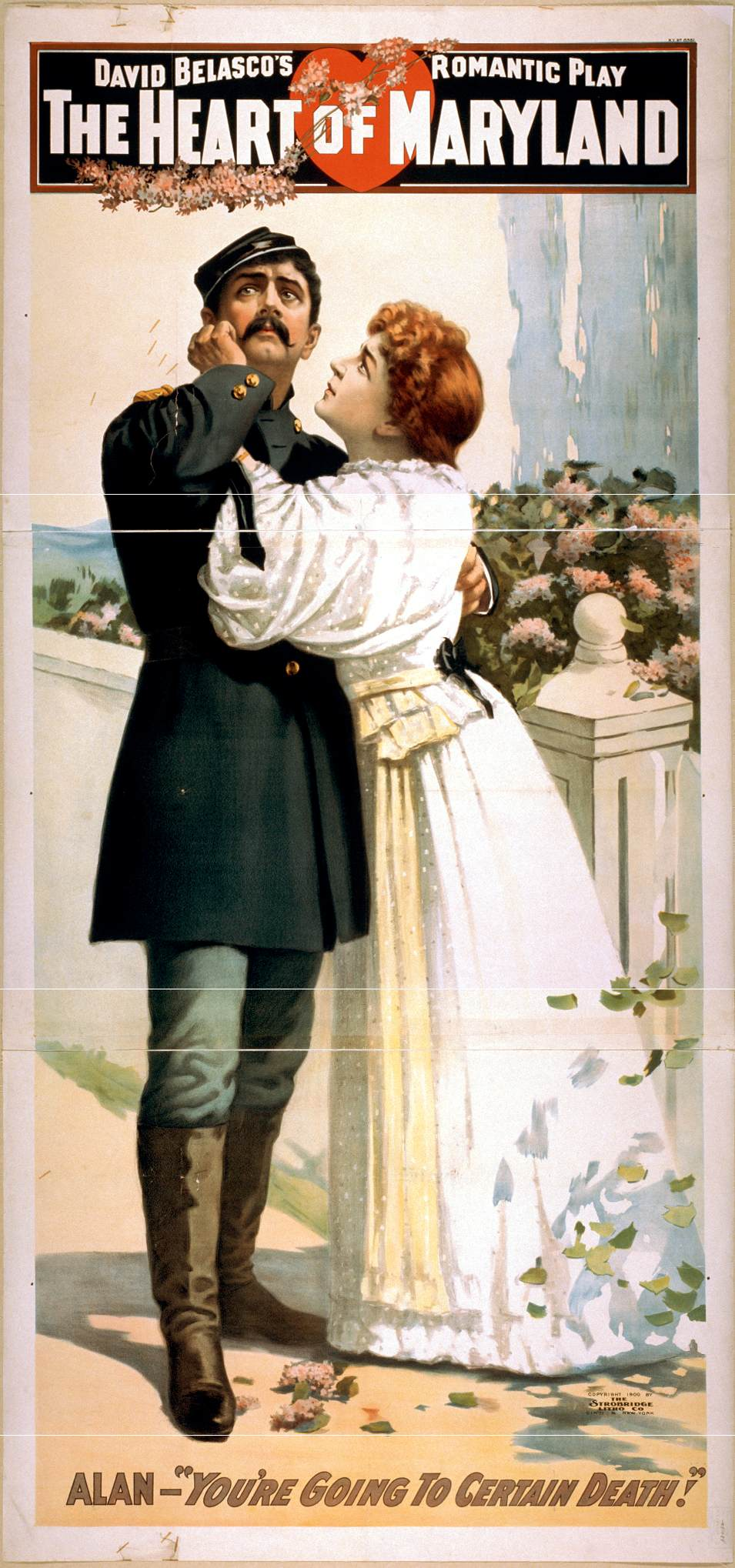
1895 poster featuring Maurice Barrymore and Mrs. Leslie Carter.

The Heart of Maryland was a theatrical play written, produced and directed by David Belasco. The four-act melodrama set in the American Civil War opened at the Herald Square Theatre in New York on October 22, 1895 and ran for 240 performances. Mrs. Leslie Carter originated the role of Maryland Calvert and Maurice Barrymore originated the role of Col. Alan Kendrick. William Furst composed the play's incidental music. The play toured throughout the United States for several years, and was made into a silent film by the same title in 1927. Silent versions also appeared in 1915, with Mrs. Carter in her original role, and in 1921.

Belasco said that the play was inspired in part by the poem Curfew Must Not Ring Tonight by Rose Hartwick Thorpe. As he recalled, "The picture of that swaying young figure hanging heroically to the clapper of an old church bell lived in my memory for a quarter of a century. When the time came that I needed a play to exploit the love and heroism of a woman I wrote a play around that picture. It furnished me the idea for 'The Heart of Maryland'."

The Best Plays of 1894-1899 featured The Heart of Maryland as the most notable play of the 1895-1896 season.

== Bibliography ==
- Chapman, John and Garrison P. Sherwood, eds., The Best Plays of 1894-1899, New York: Dodd, Mead and Company, 1955.
