= George E. Dixon =

Commander of the Confederate submarine H.L. Hunley

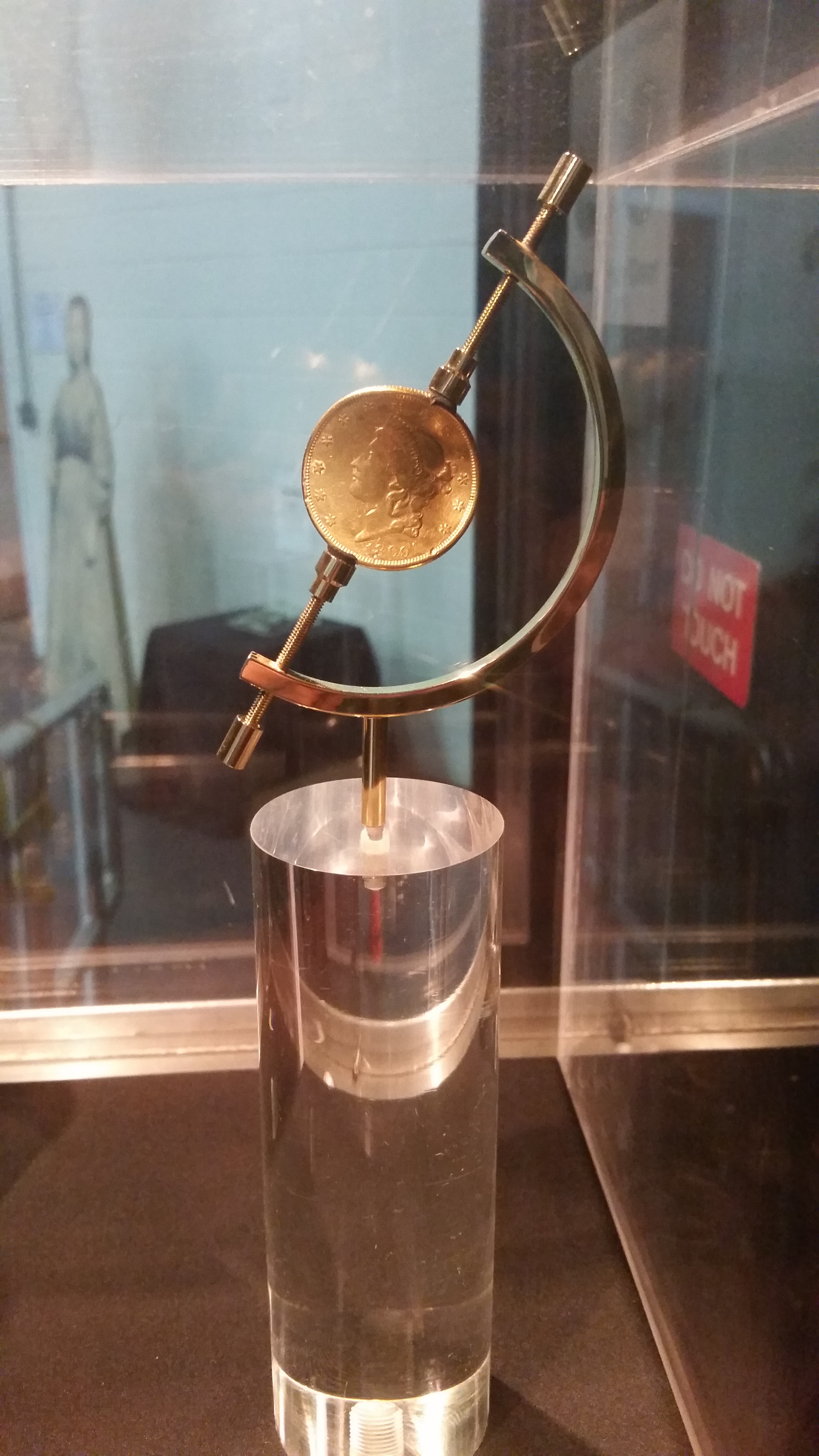
Lt. George Dixon's gold coin on display at the Warren Lasch Conservation Center, where the Hunley is being restored

George Erasmus Dixon (1837? – February 17, 1864) was a first lieutenant in the Confederate Army in the American Civil War. He is best known as the commander of the Confederate submarine H.L. Hunley during her successful mission to sink the Union blockading ship USS Housatonic off Charleston, South Carolina.

== Biography ==
Although Dixon's early life is largely unknown, the 1860 census lists him as a 23-year-old native of Kentucky or maybe South Carolina. He was a steamboat engineer and had lived in New Orleans, Louisiana before moving to Mobile, Alabama. Dixon's expensive tailor-made uniform and jewelry found on his remains suggest that he was a man of some wealth.

Dixon was a Mason, and a member of Mobile Lodge No. 40. Minutes of Union Chapter No. 3, Royal Arch Masons, indicate that Dixon visited that body on March 20, 1863, which proves he was also a York Rite Man. The famed Albert G. Mackey was the presiding officer at that particular meeting.

Dixon was a member of a pre-war militia company, the Washington Light Infantry of Mobile. In the autumn of 1861, the Washington Light Infantry became Company A, 21st Alabama Infantry Regiment. Dixon by then was a sergeant. He would later be promoted to lieutenant. In March 1862, Dixon's regiment proceeded to Corinth, Mississippi, and the following month took an active part in the Battle of Shiloh, losing 200 men killed or wounded out of the 650 engaged. Dixon himself was severely wounded in the left leg. Luckily, a $20 gold coin he carried as a good luck piece saved his leg, and possibly his life. However, the impact seriously damaged his femur and Dixon would limp for the rest of his short life. Following the battle, the regiment was reorganized and returned to Mobile to man the city's defenses as artillerymen. It was during the uneventful garrison duty at Mobile that Dixon became interested in the submarine that Horace Lawson Hunley was building.

On February 17, 1864, Dixon commanded the Confederate submarine on her first and only attack on the Union Navy. He was successful in sinking his target, but the close proximity of its own ordnance when detonated damaged the submarine, causing her to sink during her attempted return to shore. Dixon and his seven crewmen all perished.

After the submarine was located and recovered in 2000, Dixon's remains were identified. His home Lodge, now known as Mobile-McCormick Lodge No. 40, and the Masonic Grand Lodges of Alabama and South Carolina participated in the military and Masonic funeral rites when the remains of the submarine's crewmen were interred on April 17, 2004 in Magnolia Cemetery in Charleston, South Carolina.

=== Gold coin legend ===
A romantic legend concerning George Dixon and his gold coin has been told for more than a century. Dixon is said to have been given the gold coin by his sweetheart, Queenie Bennett. She asked him to carry it for good luck and as a token of her affection. Dixon kept the coin always with him, and at the Battle of Shiloh it was in his trousers pocket. During the fierce fighting on April 6, 1862, Dixon was struck in the upper thigh by a minié ball. When he examined the wound, he discovered the bullet had struck the coin directly in the center, bending the coin but saving his leg by absorbing much of the impact.

Following the recovery of the H. L. Hunley, the story was partially verified by the discovery of the gold coin with Dixon's remains. Forensic anthropologist Diane France was hired to study the recovered skull of Dixon. Reconstructing Dixon's appearance, she found the man in a photograph Queenie Bennett's family had always presumed to be Dixon was not him. The inscription on the coin fails to mention Bennett, but it does confirm that it stopped a bullet at Shiloh. The United States $20 double eagle coin was minted in 1860 and is clearly deformed from the bullet's impact. Both the coin itself and a wound on Dixon's femur were found to have traces of lead. The reverse of the coin is inscribed with four short lines:

Shiloh
April 6, 1862
My life Preserver
G. E. D.

Other contemporary evidence also suggests the legend may be true. James M. Williams, who was also a member of the Washington Light Infantry and Company A of the 21st Alabama Infantry, wrote his wife about Dixon the day after the battle:

Corinth - April 8th, 1862

Dear Lizzie
I telegraphed you today that I am well and safely through the two days of battle... The wounded are being brought into camp... George Dixon, shot in the hip, the ball striking a gold piece ranged upwards and came out of his side; will probably recover if he can be well cared for...

The letter was published in From That Terrible Field - Civil War letters of James M. Williams, Twenty-First Alabama Infantry Volunteers, (University of Alabama Press, 1981, John Kent Folmer, ed.) Williams was Dixon's close friend and named his first son George Dixon Williams.

The damaged coin is now on display with other artifacts and the submarine Hunley herself at the Warren Lasch Conservation Center.

Image of Gold $20 coin https://web.archive.org/web/20180816023824/http://www.civilwaralbum.com/misc4/hunley_dixon_coin1.htm
