= USS Housatonic (1861) =

Sloop-of-war of the United States Navy

Coordinates: 32°43′7″N 79°48′17″W

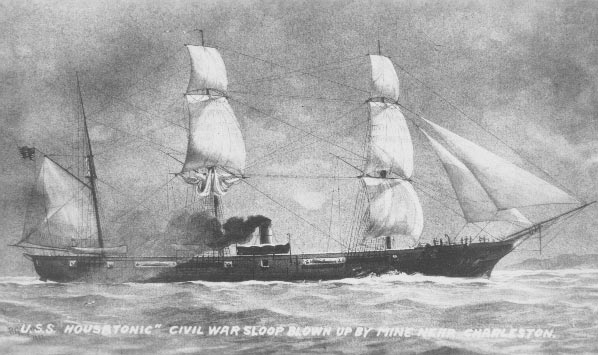
- USS Housatonic (1862–1864). Wash drawing by R.G. Skerrett, 1902

History

United States
- Name: USS Housatonic
- Namesake: The Housatonic River
- Builder: Boston Navy Yard, Charlestown, Massachusetts
- Launched: 20 November 1861
- Sponsored by: Miss Jane Coffin Colby and Miss Susan Paters Hudson
- Commissioned: 29 August 1862
- Fate: Sunk 17 February 1864

General characteristics
- Type: Screw sloop
- Displacement: 1,240 long tons (1,260 t)
- Length: 205 ft (62 m)
- Beam: 38 ft (12 m)
- Draft: 8 ft 7 in (2.62 m)
- Propulsion: Sail and steam
- Speed: 9 knots (17 km/h; 10 mph)
- Complement: 160 officers and enlisted
- Armament: 1 × 100-pounder (45 kg) Parrott rifle; 3 × 30-pounder (14 kg) Parrott rifles; 1 × 11 in (280 mm) Dahlgren smoothbore; 2 × 32-pounders (15 kg); 2 × 24-pounder (11 kg) howitzers; 1 × 12-pounder (5 kg) howitzer; 1 × 12-pounder (5 kg) rifle

USS Housatonic was a screw sloop-of-war of the United States Navy, taking its name from the Housatonic River of New England.

Housatonic was launched on 20 November 1861, by the Boston Navy Yard at Charlestown, Massachusetts, sponsored by Miss Jane Coffin Colby and Miss Susan Paters Hudson; and commissioned there on 29 August 1862, with Commander William Rogers Taylor in command. Housatonic was one of four sister ships of her class which included USS Adirondack, USS Ossipee, and USS Juniata. Housatonic is recognized as being the first ship sunk in combat by a submarine when she was attacked and sunk by H.L. Hunley in Charleston Harbor, South Carolina, though the Hunley was also sunk in the encounter.

== Service history ==
=== Blockading Charleston ===
Housatonic departed Boston on 11 September and arrived at Charleston, South Carolina, on 19 September to join the South Atlantic Blockading Squadron. She then took station outside the bar.

=== Capture of Princess Royal and Confederate counter-attack ===
On 29 January 1863, her boats—assisted by those of USS Augusta, USS G. W. Blunt, and USS America—boarded and refloated the iron steamer Princess Royal. The gunboat Unadilla had driven the blockade runner ashore as she attempted to slip into Charleston from England with a cargo consisting of two marine engines destined for Confederate ironclads, along with a large quantity of ordnance and ammunition. These imports were of such potential value to the South that they have been described as "the war's most important single cargo of contraband."

It was possibly in the hope of recovering this invaluable prize that the Confederate ironclad rams CSS Chicora and CSS Palmetto State slipped out of the main ship channel of Charleston Harbor to attack the Union blockading fleet in the early morning fog two days later. They rammed Mercedita, forcing her to strike her colors "in a sinking and perfectly defenseless condition," and then moved on to cripple Keystone State. Gunfire from the rams also damaged Quaker City and Augusta before the Confederate ships withdrew under fire from Housatonic to the protection of the shore batteries.

=== Capture of Georgiana ===
On 19 March 1863, Housatonic and Wissahickon, responding to signal flares sent up by America, chased the 407-ton iron-hulled blockade runner SS Georgiana ashore on Long Island, South Carolina. Georgiana's cargo of munitions, medicine, and merchandise was valued at over $1,000,000. She was described in contemporary dispatches and newspaper accounts as more powerful than the Confederate cruisers Alabama, Shenandoah, and Florida. The loss was a serious and significant blow to the Confederacy. The wreck of Georgiana was discovered by pioneer underwater archaeologist Lee Spence in 1965.

=== Further captures, and attacks on Charleston ===
Housatonic captured the sloop Neptune on 19 April as she attempted to run out of Charleston with a cargo of cotton and turpentine. She was also credited with assisting in the capture of the steamer Seesh on 15 May. Howitzers mounted in Housatonic's boats joined the attack on Fort Wagner on 10 July, which initiated the continuing bombardment of the Southern works at Charleston. In the ensuing months, her crew repeatedly deployed boats to shell the shoreline, patrol close inshore to gather valuable intelligence, and land troops for raids against Charleston’s outer defenses.

On 9 September 1863, Captain Charles W. Pickering submitted a report to Rear Admiral John A. Dahlgren regarding the men of his command who had taken part in the attack on Fort Sumter the previous evening. He listed the men of the 4th cutter, commanded by Lieutenant Edwin T. Brower. Among the seventeen men of Cutter Four was Frederic Augustus James. The report concludes: “All the above, with the boat, are missing.”

=== Sunk in the first submarine attack ===
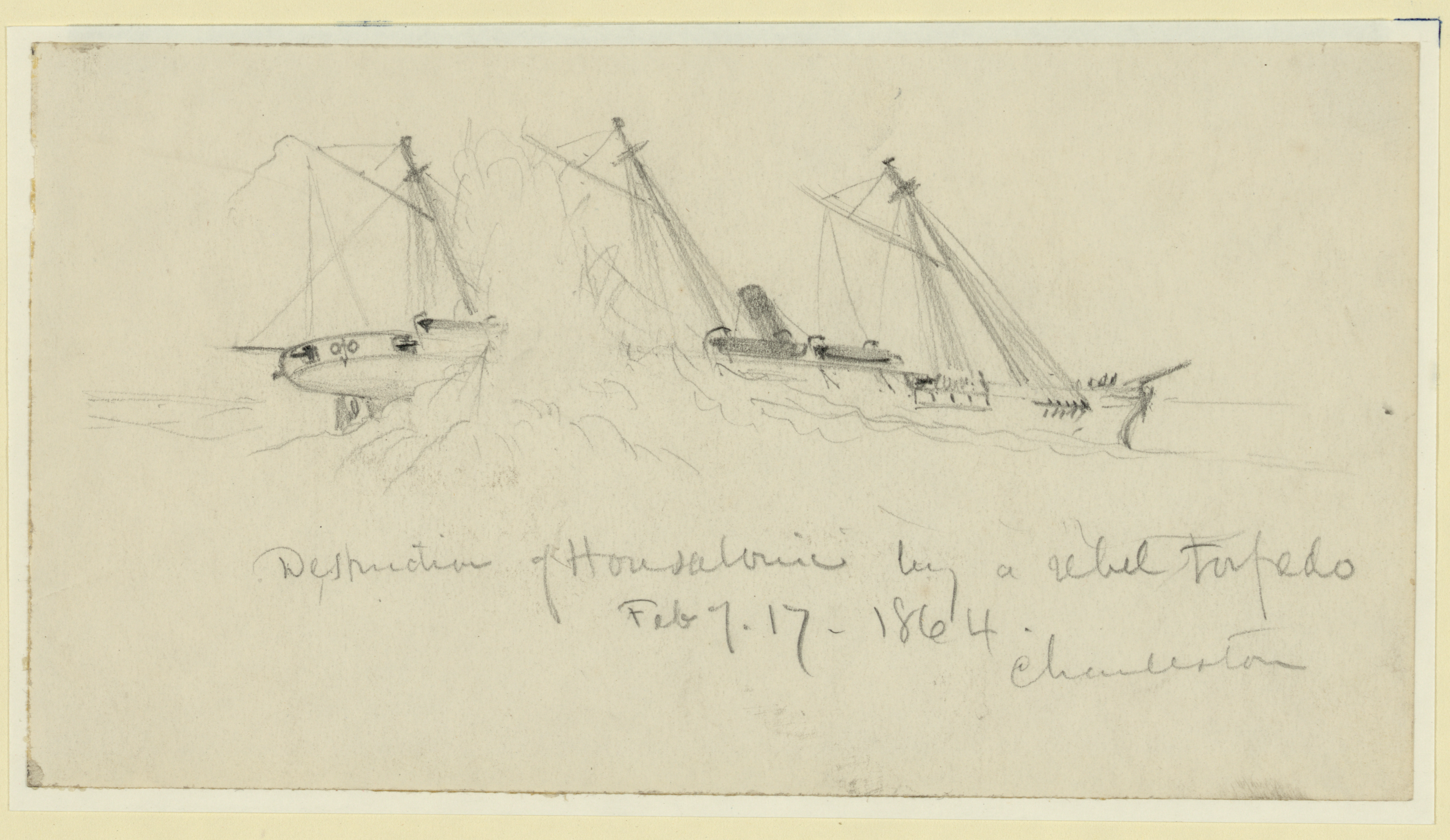
Destruction of Housatonic by a rebel torpedo; sketch by war artist William Waud (1864)

At just before 9:00 p.m. on 17 February 1864, Housatonic, commanded by Charles Pickering, was maintaining her station on the blockade outside the bar. Robert F. Flemming Jr., an African-American landsman, first sighted an object in the water about 100 yards off, approaching the ship. "It had the appearance of a plank moving in the water," Pickering later reported. Although the chain was slipped, the engine backed, and all hands were called to quarters, it was too late. Within two minutes of the first sighting, the Confederate submarine H. L. Hunley rammed her spar torpedo into Housatonic's starboard side, forward of the mizzenmast, in history's first successful submarine attack on a warship. Before the rapidly sinking ship went down, the crew managed to lower two boats, which took all the men they could hold; most others saved themselves by climbing into the rigging, which remained above water after the stricken ship settled on the bottom. Two officers and three enlisted men aboard Housatonic were killed. The Confederate submarine escaped but was lost with all hands shortly after the attack. Archaeological findings announced in 2013 suggest that the submarine may have been much closer to the point of detonation than previously realized, and that the explosion likely inflicted fatal damage on the vessel itself. In 2017, researchers at Duke University demonstrated through simulation that the Hunley crew were most likely killed immediately at their posts by the blast’s pressure wave, which fatally damaged their lungs and brains.

== Wreck ==
On February 20, 1864, Capt. Joseph W. Green of the USS Canandaigua surveyed the wreck and observed that the ship's spar deck was about [15 ft 0 in (4.57 m) below the water and that the deck "appears to have been entirely blown off." Soon thereafter, the Union began recovery efforts to raise the Housatonic's guns, which was accomplished later in 1864. In 1872, the Army Corps of Engineers commissioned Benjamin Maillefert to clear some of the wrecks from the Charleston Harbor, including the Housatonic. Throughout 1873 and 1874, Maillefert scavenged the wreck of any useful materials, and in 1909, the remnants of the ship (notably, its boilers) were further broken up to ensure the wreck was not a hazard. In 1995–96, NUMA-funded researchers tentatively located the wreck of the Housatonic, and in 1999, the wreck was surveyed by researchers from the Submerged Resources Center, the Naval Historical Center, and SCIAA.

== See also ==
- List of sailing frigates of the United States Navy
- Bibliography of early United States naval history
