= Archaeology of shipwrecks =

Study of human activity through the analysis of shipwreck artifacts

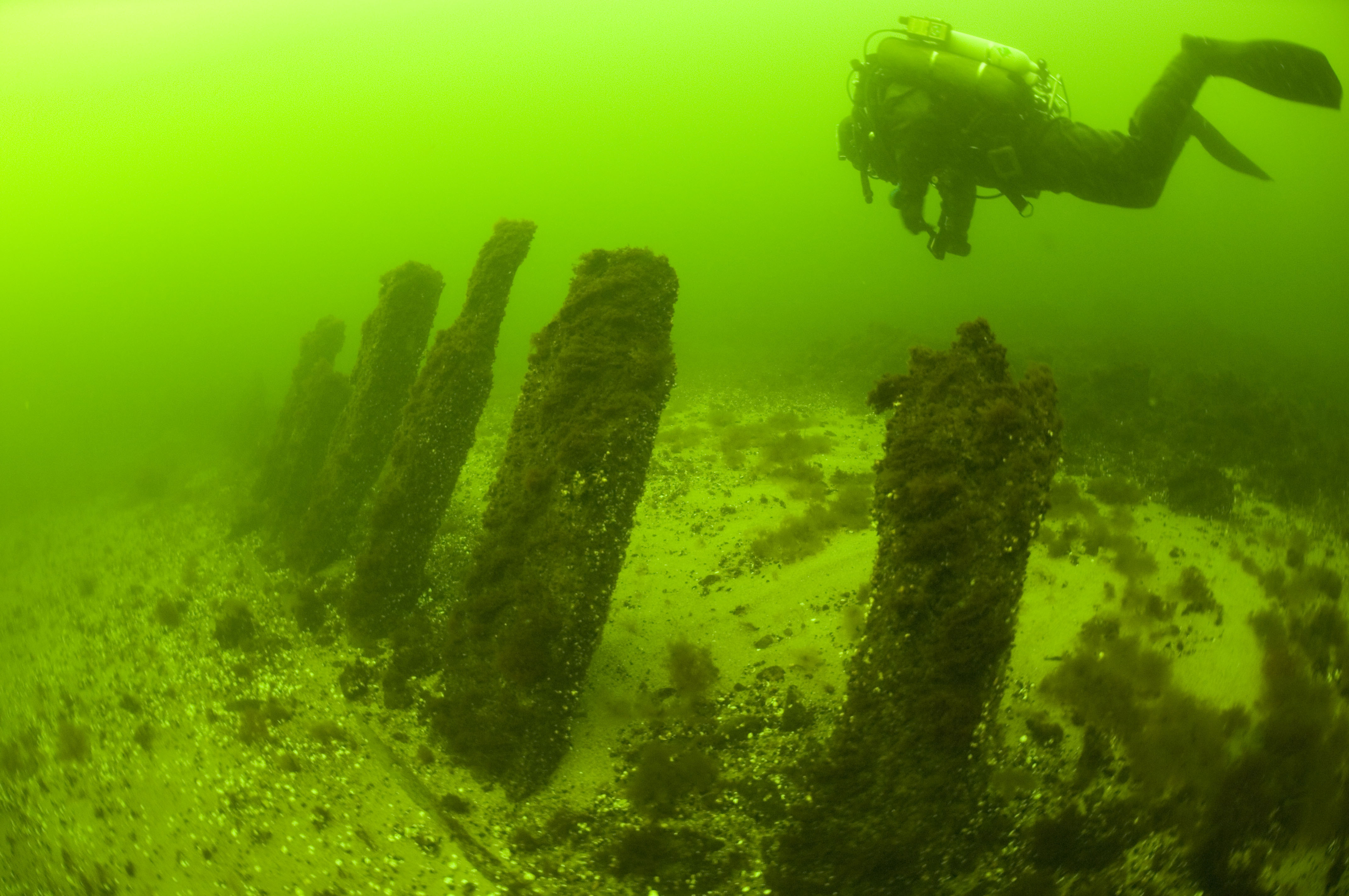
Expedition to shipwreck in Tallinn Bay.

The archaeology of shipwrecks is the field of archaeology specialized most commonly in the study and exploration of shipwrecks. Its techniques combine those of archaeology with those of diving to become Underwater archaeology. However, shipwrecks are discovered on what have become terrestrial sites.

It is necessary to understand the processes and theories by which a wreck site is formed to take into account the distortions in the archaeological material caused by the filtering and scrambling of material remains that occurs during and after the wrecking process.

Prior to being wrecked, the ship would have operated as an organised machine, and its crew, equipment, passengers and cargo need to be considered as a system. The material remains should provide clues to the functions of seaworthiness, navigation and propulsion as well as to ship-board life. These clues can also infer how a ship functioned, in special regards to social, political, and economic systems. These underwater shipwreck sites are protected under the UNESCO Convention.

== UNESCO Convention on the Protection of the Underwater Cultural Heritage ==
Shipwrecks that have been underwater for one hundred years or more are protected by the UNESCO Convention on the Protection of the Underwater Cultural Heritage. This convention aims at preventing looting and the destruction or loss of historic and cultural information. It helps states parties to protect their underwater cultural heritage with an international legal framework.

== Theories of shipwrecks ==
=== Muckelroy's model ===
A systematic model for the characterisation and interpretation of the archaeology of shipwrecks was first proposed by Keith Muckelroy in 1976 in a paper on the Kennemerland, which was wrecked in 1664. Muckelroy's system model describes the evolution of the material remains of the ship from the wrecking process, subsequent salvage operations and the disintegration and rearrangements of the remains from environmental factors. Although Muckelroy considered both natural processes and human activity in his model, subsequent research has mainly expanded the environmental factors and there has been little published on the human processes.

=== Considering human intervention ===
A paper by Martin Gibbs in 2006, expands Muckelroy's model to consider human behaviour at the time of the disaster and the long-term relationship between people and shipwrecks. This model uses studies of humans involved in disasters to characterise the human activity into phases around the time of the wrecking. This model considers:

- Pre-impact threat phase, in which humans considering the risk may take avoiding action which results in there being no wreck, or may take unsuccessful action to mitigate the perceived threat, for example the wreck location may be the result of attempting to avoid some perceived greater threat. Stowage of cargo may also indicate consideration of threat.
- Pre-impact warning phase, in which humans may take drastic action to avoid catastrophe, for example, running a vessel ashore, jettisoning cargo or running out anchors.
- Impact, in which the decision is made to abandon ship or remain aboard, and, for example, attempt to refloat.
- Post impact, where survivors regroup and, for example, salvage their own goods or make repairs.
- Rescue and Post-disaster where the vessel is abandoned and in which third parties may be involved in salvage or in removing remains that present a hazard to navigation.

== Preservation of material underwater ==
Of the many examples where the sea bed provides an extremely hostile environment for submerged evidence of history, one of the most notable, the RMS Titanic, though a relatively young wreck and in deep water so calcium-starved that concretion does not occur, appears strong and relatively intact, though indications are that it has already incurred irreversible degradation of her steel and iron hull. As such degradation inevitably continues, data will be forever lost, objects' context will be destroyed and the bulk of the wreck will over centuries completely deteriorate on the floor of the Atlantic Ocean. Comparative evidence shows that all iron and steel ships, especially those in a highly oxygenated environment, continue to degrade and will continue to do so until only their engines and other machinery project much above the sea-floor. Where it remains even after the passage of time, the iron or steel hull is often fragile with no remaining metal within the layer of concretion and corrosion products. The USS Monitor, having been found in the 1970s, was subjected to a program of attempted in situ preservation, for example, but deterioration of the vessel progressed at such a rate that the rescue of her turret was undertaken lest nothing be saved from the wreck.

Some wrecks, lost to natural obstacles to navigation, are at risk of being smashed by subsequent wrecks sunk by the same hazard, or are deliberately destroyed because they present a hazard to navigation. Even in deep water, commercial activities such as pipe-laying operations and deep sea trawling can place a wreck at risk. Such a wreck is the Mardi Gras shipwreck sunk in the Gulf of Mexico in 4,000 feet (1,200 meters) of water. The shipwreck lay forgotten at the bottom of the sea until it was discovered in 2002 by an oilfield inspection crew working for the Okeanos Gas Gathering Company (OGGC). Large pipelines can crush sites and render some of their remnants inaccessible as pipe is dropped from the ocean surface to the substrate thousands of feet below. Trawl nets snag and tear superstructures and separate artifacts from their context.

When a ship is wrecked, it suffers many changes of state until the remains eventually reach equilibrium with their environment. Initially, the wrecking process changes it from the human organised form of a working vessel to an unstable state of structure and artefacts underwater. Natural forces act upon it during the wrecking process and continue to act until equilibrium is reached. Heavy items sink rapidly, lighter items may drift before sinking, while buoyant items may float away completely. This causes a filtering and scrambling of the material remains. The sudden arrival of a structure on the seabed will change the currents, often resulting in new scour and deposition patterns in the seabed.

Once underwater, chemical processes and the action of biological organisms will contribute to the disintegration. At any point in these processes, humans may have intervened, for example by salvaging items of value.

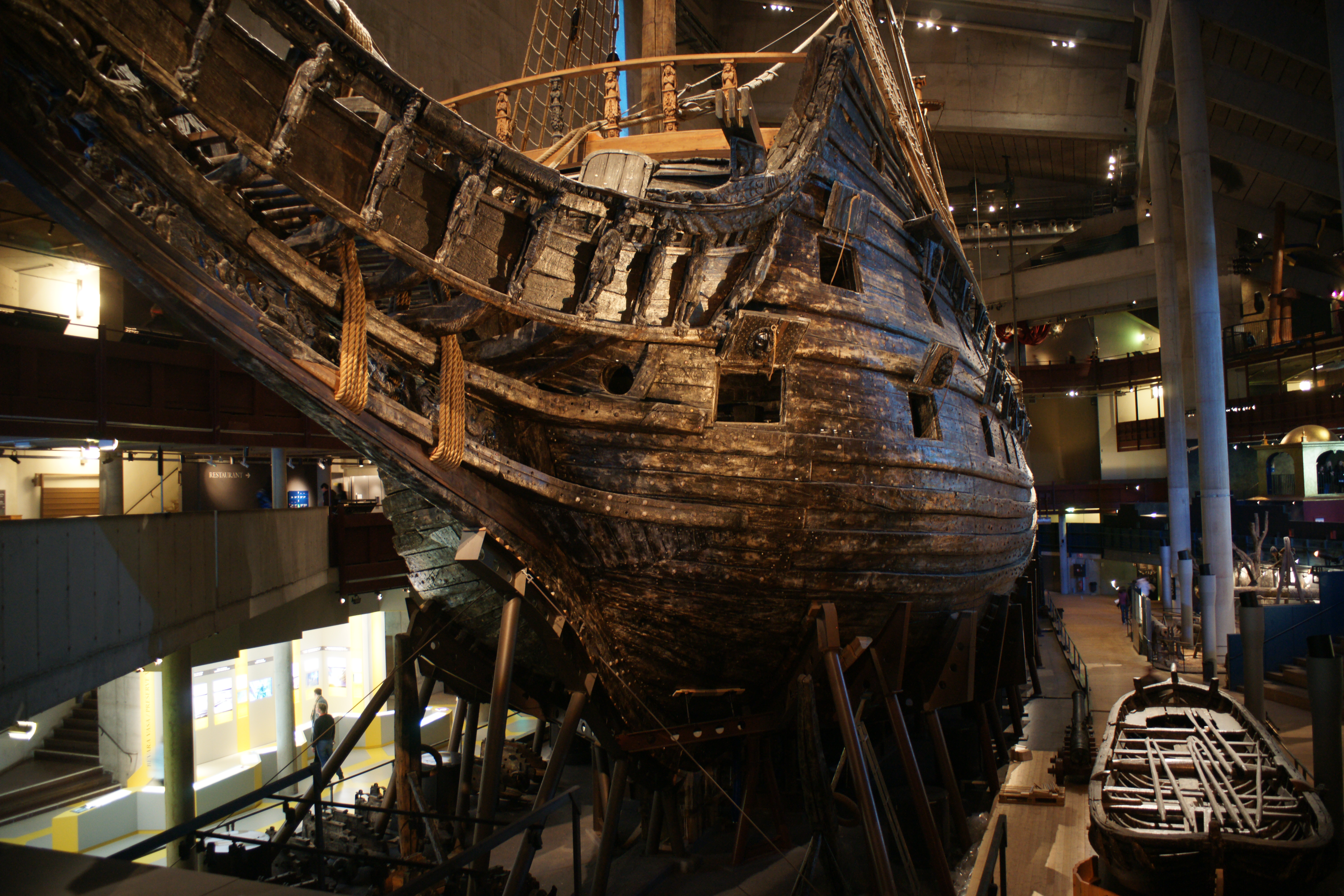
The bow of Vasa, a Swedish warship that foundered and sank on its maiden voyage in 1628. It was salvaged in 1961 and is now on permanent display at the Vasa Museum in Stockholm.

The wrecks, and other archaeological sites that have been preserved have generally survived because the dynamic nature of the sea bed can result in artifacts becoming rapidly buried in sediments. These sediments then provide an anaerobic environment which protects from further degradation. Wet environments, whether on land in the form of peat bogs and wells, or underwater are particularly important for the survival of organic material, such as wood, leather, fabric and horn. Cold and absence of light also aid survival of artifacts, because there is little energy available for either organic activity or chemical reactions. Salt water provides for greater organic activity than freshwater, and in particular, the shipworm, teredo navalis, lives only in salt water, so some of the best preservation in the absence of sediments has been found in the cold, dark waters of the Great Lakes in North America and in the (low salinity) Baltic Sea (where the Vasa was preserved).

=== Interpretation and presentation of shipwrecks ===
Diver trails also called wreck trails can be used to allow scuba-divers to visit and understand archaeological sites that are suitable for scuba-diving One excellent example is the Florida Public Archaeology Network's (FPAN) "Florida Panhandle Shipwreck Trail." The Florida Panhandle Shipwreck Trail features 12 shipwrecks including artificial reefs and a variety of sea life for diving, snorkeling and fishing offshore of Pensacola, Destin, Panama City and Port St. Joe, Florida. Otherwise presentation will typically rely on publication (book or journal articles, web-sites and electronic media such as CD-ROM). Television programs, web videos and social media can also bring an understanding of underwater archaeology to a broad audience. The Mardi Gras Shipwreck Project integrated a one-hour HD documentary, short videos for public viewing and video updates during the expedition as part of the educational outreach. Webcasting is also another tool for educational outreach. For one week in 2000 and 2001, live underwater video of the Queen Anne's Revenge Shipwreck Project was webcast to the Internet as a part of the QAR DiveLive educational program that reached thousands of children around the world. Created and co-produced by Nautilus Productions and Marine Grafics, this project enabled students to talk to scientists and learn about methods and technologies used by the underwater archaeology team.

== Salvaging ==
In the 20th century, salvaging companies and looters recovered treasures and other artifacts from shipwrecks with little regulation governing the practices. Laws that have since been passed in many jurisdictions now form the basis for legal contention in the event of a successful recovery and salvaging expedition.

== Examples of famous shipwrecks ==
=== RMS Titanic (1912) ===
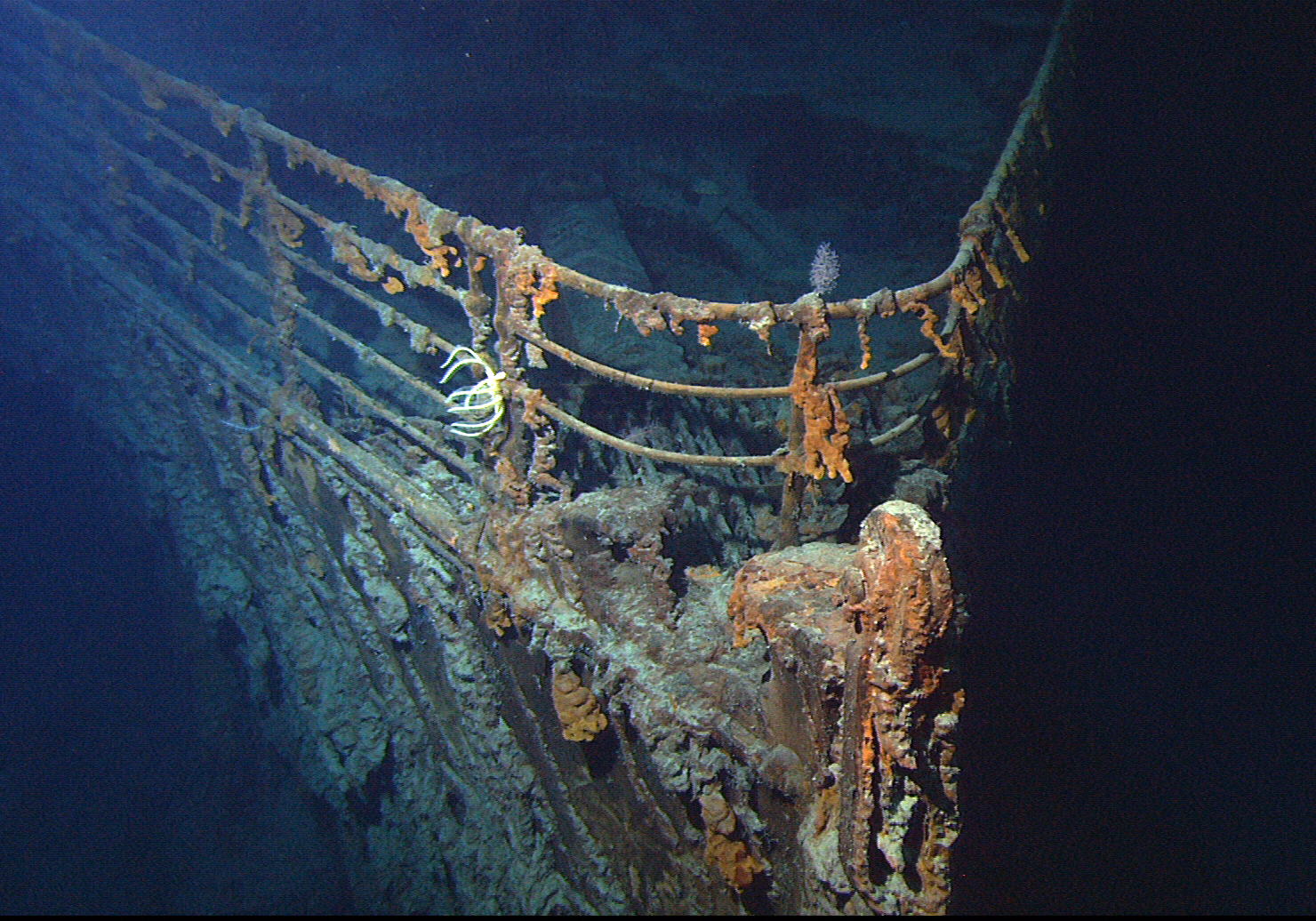
Bow of Titanic discovered within recent years.

The infamous shipwreck of the Titanic occurred on April 15, 1912. This ship was the largest and most luxurious ocean liner at the time of its launch. Following impact with an iceberg, the ship split in two and sank to a depth of more than 2 miles below the surface. Deep in the Atlantic, the bow of the ship sank deep into the clay at the bottom of the ocean, scattering artefacts from dishes, machinery, tiles, and even the remains of passengers throughout miles of seabed. However, processes of the sea began to work against the Titanic's existence. "Marine organisms and acidic clay consumed wood and other organic material, including human remains. Bacteria colonized and began to eat away at the steel, leaving behind tendrils and puddles of red, orange, and yellow byproducts." Seventy three years after its sinking, it was discovered in 1985. Since then, in 2010 robotic vehicles allowed for realistic footage and archeologists to walk the decks of the ship.

=== SS Georgiana (1863) ===
SS Georgiana was an American steamboat, cargo ship of the Confederate States back in the mid-1800s. It was considered one of the most powerful confederate cruisers. However, on its maiden voyage it was scuttled and burned. In 1965, it was discovered by E. Lee Spence in Charleston, SC. "Today the Georgiana sits on the bottom with her huge boiler only five feet (1.5 m) under the surface. She is now covered with a wide array of sea fan, sea whips, and living corals. Large sections of the hull are still intact. In places the starboard side of the hull protrudes over nine feet (2.7 m) from the sand."

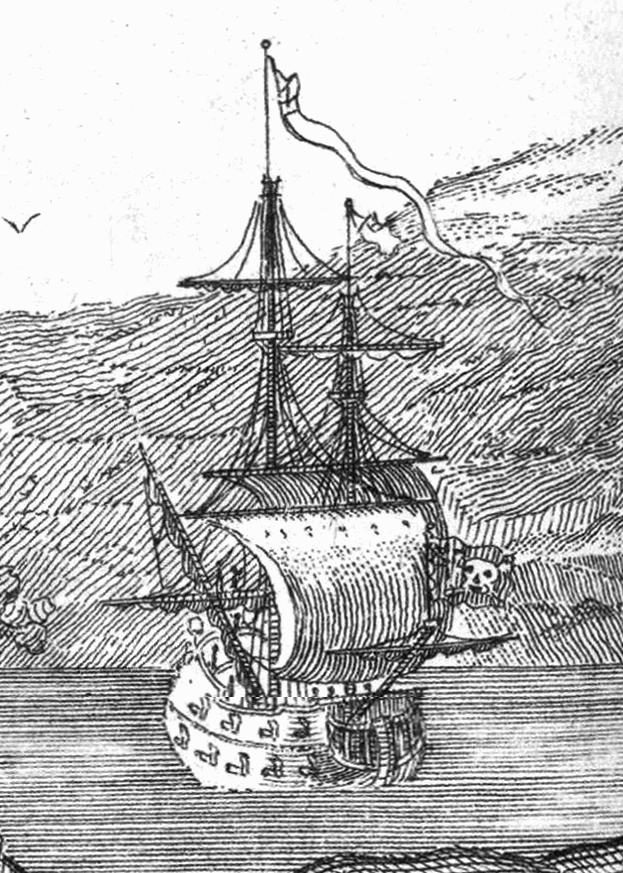
A sketched image of realistic Queen Anne's Revenge Ship

=== Queen Anne's Revenge - Blackbeard's flagship ===
This vessel was believed to be Blackbeard's flagship after artifacts have proven its origin. This ship was originally named "La Concorde" and served as a French slave ship. As the ship managed through the Middle Passage, many French and Africans had perished or were severely ill. Blackbeard and his crew came across the French Ship, and were able to obtain it and the La Concorde's crew and passengers could not fight. On November 21, 1996 Intersal, Inc., while working under permit from the state of North Carolina, discovered the wrecksite. Intersal then handed over the wreck to the state of North Carolina in exchange for media and replica rights. A team of researchers found artifacts near historic Beaufort Inlet that confirmed the ship's origin. "Several diagnostic artifacts were recovered from the site, designated North Carolina shipwreck site 31CR314, including a bronze bell dated 1705, a sounding weight, an English blunderbuss barrel, a lead cannon apron and two cannonballs." These 18th century artifacts, cannons, and large anchors also confirmed the ship's identity.

== See also ==
- Maritime archaeology – Archaeological study of human interaction with the sea
- Underwater archaeology – Study of human activity via evidence found underwater
- Lists of shipwrecks
- Rusticle – Rust formation often on shipwrecks
- Wreck diving – Recreational diving on wrecks
- Lighthouse Archaeological Maritime Program (LAMP) – Lighthouse in Florida, US
- Sea Research Society – American nonprofit for marine research
- Nautical Archaeology Society – British nautical archaeology organisation

=== Archaeologically important shipwrecks ===
- Uluburun Late Bronze Age shipwreck, 14th century BC
- Cape Gelidonya Late Bronze Age shipwreck, c. 1200 BC
- Antikythera c 80–50 BC, includes the astronomical computer, the Antikythera mechanism
- Skuldelev ships, 5 Nordic ships of different types, 1030–1042 AD
- Bremen cog, 1380
- Newport medieval ship c. 1466
- Gribshunden, 1495
- Mary Rose, 1545
- The archaeological site 24M in Red Bay, identified as the 1565 wreck of the ship San Juan
- Vasa, 1628
- VOC ship Batavia, 1629
- French explorer La Salle's ship La Belle, 1686
- HMS Stirling Castle, lost 1703, has evidence of the retrofitting of an early example of wheel steering
- Queen Anne's Revenge, 1718 - Blackbeard's flagship
- VOC ship Amsterdam, 1749
- HMS Pandora, 1791, is considered to be one of the most significant shipwrecks in the Southern Hemisphere.
- Medusa, 1816
- SS Georgiana, 1863, most powerful Confederate cruiser, was lost with million dollar cargo on maiden voyage, Charleston, SC, wreck discovered by E. Lee Spence in 1966.
- Hunley, 1864, first submarine in history to sink a ship, Charleston, SC, wreck 1st reported as discovered by E. Lee Spence in 1970. The wreck (at the location Spence had filed with National Park Service in 1974) was independently verified to be Hunley by 1994/95 NUMA/SCIAA expedition directed by Mark M. Newell and funded by novelist Clive Cussler.

== See also ==
- List of surviving ancient ships
