= Treasure hunting =

Physical search for treasure

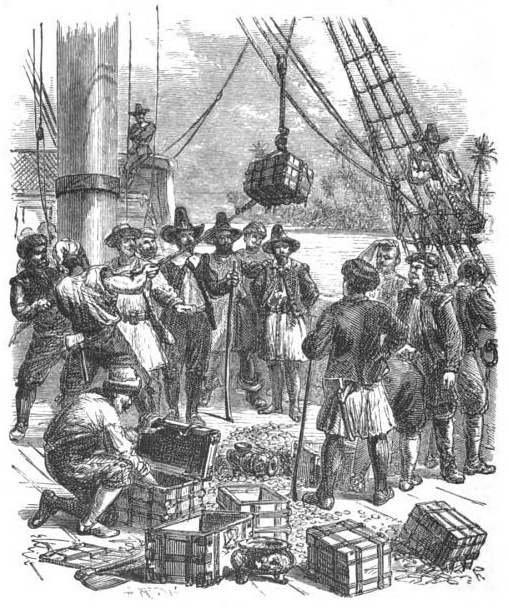
Massachusetts treasure hunter Sir William Phips raising treasure found from a Spanish shipwreck in 1687.

Treasure hunting is the physical search for treasure. One of the most popular types of modern day treasure hunters is historic shipwreck salvors. These underwater treasure salvors try to find sunken shipwrecks and retrieve artifacts with both commercial and archaeological value. In many instances, discovery of a wreck only occurs after searching tens of thousands of square nautical miles, thus making discovery normally impossible for archaeologists.

Since the popularization of metal detectors in the 1970s, treasure hunting has also taken the form of beach combing for lost valuables. Beach hunters may search for modern jewelry, pocket change, or shipwreck treasure. Most metal detectors will fall in the $150–$600 price range, but can even cost upwards of several thousand dollars. Metal detecting is generally quite tedious and most enthusiasts go years without finding an actually valuable object. Metal detectors are quite useful to archaeologists as well. On terrestrial sites they give researchers the ability to scan large swathes of land for important artifacts without having to consume time and resources excavating large holes. Skilled amateur archaeologists are also able to assist professionals by using their metal detectors to discover previously unknown sites. For example, in the United Kingdom, many discoveries have been made by metal detectorists that have had a large impact on the understanding of early British history.

== History ==
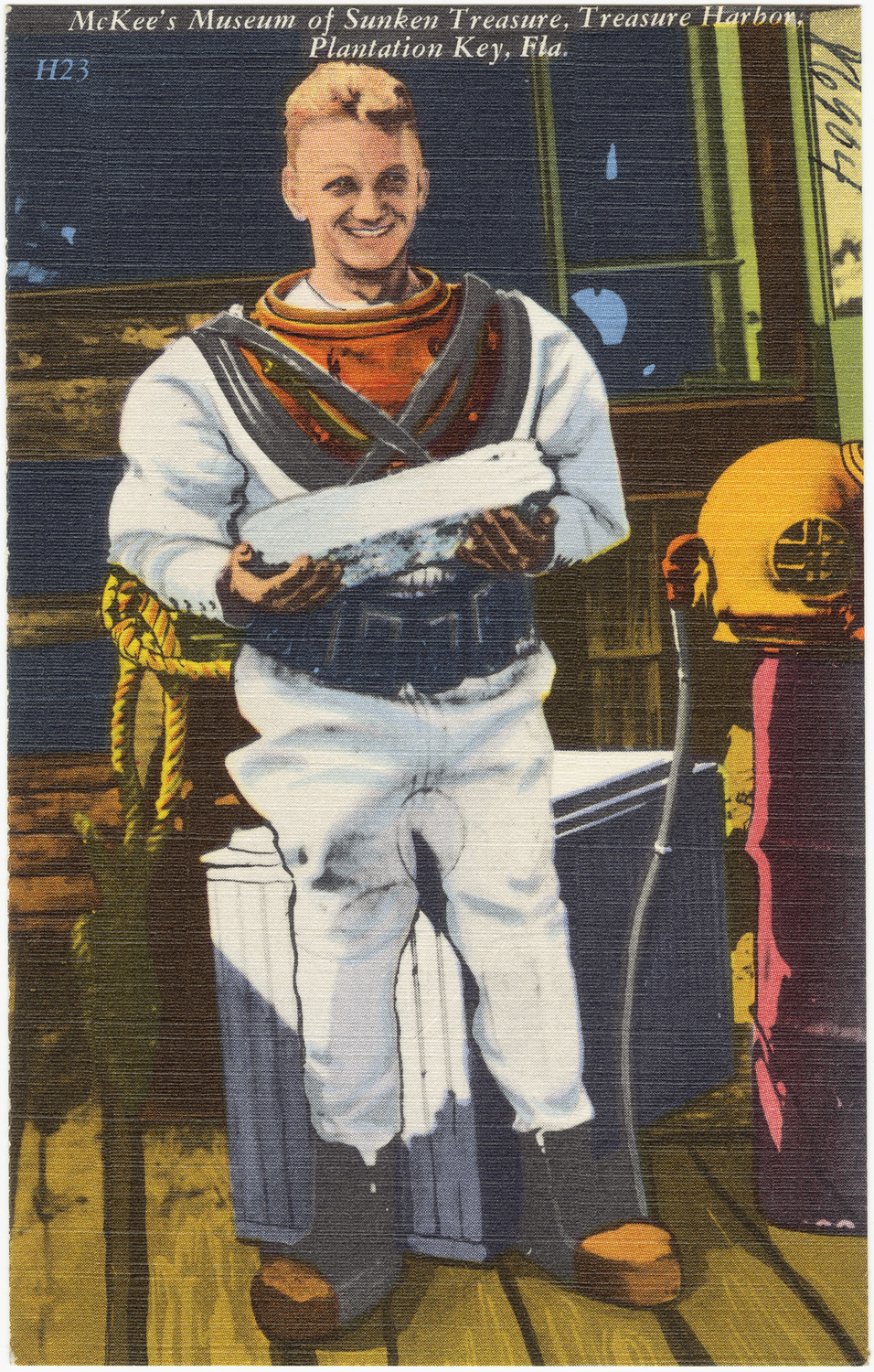
McKee's Museum of Sunken Treasure, Treasure Harbor, Plantation Key, Florida

In the 12th century text Account of Egypt, Abd al-Latif al-Baghdadi wrote about the historic value of the Egyptian monuments, and praised the contemporary governments for trying to preserve them. He also discussed the profession of treasure hunting, noting that poorer treasure hunters were often sponsored by rich businessmen to go on archeological expeditions. In some cases, an expedition could turn out to be fraudulent, with the treasure hunter disappearing with large amounts of money extracted from sponsors.

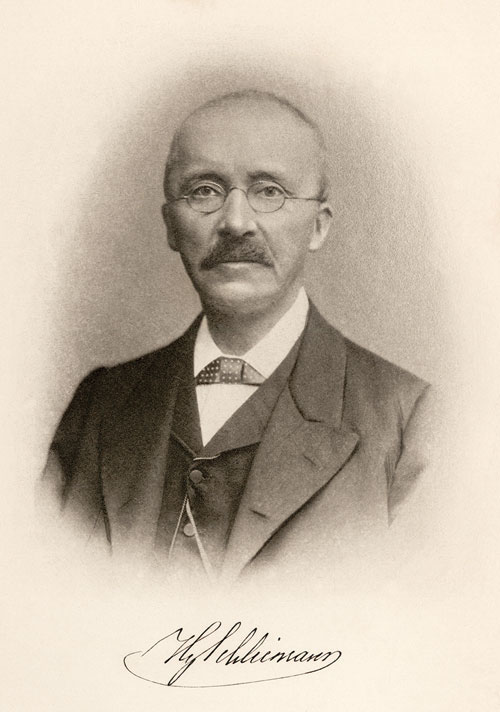
Treasure hunter Heinrich Schliemann

The early stages of the development of archaeology included a significant aspect of treasure hunting; Heinrich Schliemann's excavations at Troy, and later at Mycenae, both turned up significant finds of golden artifacts. Early work in Egyptology also included a similar motive. Modern amateur treasure hunters use relatively inexpensive metal detectors to locate finds at terrestrial sites.

Underwater archaeologist, Peter Throckmorton, in a paper he wrote in 1969 as part of a Historical Archaeology Forum on E. Lee Spence's salvage of a Civil War blockade runner, addressing the question of whether treasure hunting and archaeology are in conflict, stated: "The foregoing discussion may seem like an attack on Mr. Spence. I do not mean this to be so. A whole new branch of archaeology, that of Mycenaean studies, was founded by Heinrich Schliemann, who also had the courage to remember his dreams ... It is right to dream, and it would be the worst kind of mistake on the part of the state to discourage the big dreams of men like Mr. Spence, and to let a project requiring that sort of enterprise fall into the hands of what Mr. Spence's friend terms 'some bloody historical society' which might lay the dead hand of unimaginative and stereotyped thinking on Mr. Spence's courage and ability." In 1972, Spence and Throckmorton, along with three other men, were awarded the degree of Doctor of Marine Histories by the College of Marine Arts on July 16, 1972, becoming first people in the world to be awarded a doctorate for work in marine archaeology.

More recently, some treasure hunters have started working underwater, where modern technology allows access to wrecks containing valuables, which were previously inaccessible. Starting with the diving suit, the Scuba, and later to ROVs, each new generation of technology has made wrecks better accessible. Many of these wrecks have resulted in the treasure salvage of many artifacts from Spanish treasure fleets and others.

Since at least the 1970’s, treasure salvaging companies have been hiring archaeologists to help excavate sites. Although oftentimes the people with the most knowledge about a particular site are the private citizens staking their fortunes on the venture, a staff archeologist can substantiate a dig. This can allow the excavations to become accepted within the archeological community. In many cases, however, private citizens conducting archaeological deemed activities with or without an on site archeologist are still labeled by the academic community as pillagers. And the archeologists who support this public-private venture are often outcast.

Nevertheless, when this type of archaeological research is carried out it can provide archaeologists the resources to fund research of sites that would otherwise go unrecorded or be subject to destruction by natural forces. Typically many recovered items will also end up donated to state and local museums for all to enjoy. Some cities, such as St. Augustine and Key West have privately operated museums run by the treasure salvors which allow the public to see recovered treasure firsthand.

== Legality ==
In 1906, the Secretaries of the Interior of Agriculture and War made an act for the preservation of American Antiquities (ancient artifacts). This act says that each of the Interior would have their own specific authority over different artifacts or locations based on their department. These artifacts and locations are as follows: Historic landmarks, historic monuments, objects of antiquity, objects of scientific value and historical value. The Secretary of Agriculture has jurisdiction over artifacts and monuments found within the outer limits of forest reserves. The secretary of War for any land that resides in or near a military reserve. The lands that are controlled by the US Government will be supervised by the respective Secretary. Permits will not be granted to those trying to move or take any monument or artifact that can be preserved in its original place and remain an ancient monument. A permit will not be granted to someone "whose eyes are bigger than their stomach." In other words, those trying to explore a vast amount of area with little help and the job seems to not be done within the time limit designated by the certain someone, that permit will not be granted. Each permit will be granted by the respective Secretaries that have jurisdiction over those certain sites. Also including to the permit just stated above you also need these following requirements: The name of the Institution making the request, how much time it will take, the date, the person in charge of the project, what type of project it is going to be, excavating, gathering or examining, and the museum where the artifact will be shown and preserved. Each permit will only be granted for 3 years or less. An extension can be granted if progress is shown. Permits will not be in effect if work does not begin within six months of getting the permit.

The United States federal Abandoned Shipwrecks Act, which asserts the federal government's ownership of abandoned United States water shipwrecks, was put into place in 1988. Any shipwreck that is embedded in submerged lands and/or in coralline formations protected by a State on submerged lands of a state is property of the government. The Abandoned Shipwrecks Act then transfers ownership to the appropriate State government. The Supreme Court upheld the Abandoned Shipwrecks Act constitutionality in 1998. In the US, the finder of a ship not abandoned could seek a salvage award.

The countries England, Wales, and Northern Ireland claim gold and silver finds that are more than three hundred years old for the crown by way of the Treasure Act of 1996. Any found treasure in these nations must be reported within fourteen days of uncovering.

The United States awards ownership to the landowner. If finds occur on federal land it can be considered a federal offense. Most of the United States prosecutes the unearthing of burial grounds.

== In popular culture ==
In 2012, the National Geographic Channel released its reality show Diggers. Spike TV also released a similar program, American Diggers in the same year. In 2014 a comedic, fictional TV series called Detectorists was released by the BBC and directed by Mackenzie Crook. The show is about two treasure hunting metal detectorists, Lance (Toby Jones) and Andy (Mackenzie Crook), and their desire to contribute to the archaeological record and find treasure. The plot's major focus revolves around their search for the lost burial of King Sexræd of the East Saxons; a 7th century Anglo-Saxon king.

== Notable treasure hunting companies ==
- 1715 Fleet - Queen's Jewels, LLC is located on Florida's treasure coast and has been involved in the archaeological recovery of thousands of artifacts and gold and silver coins from the 1715 Spanish Plate Fleet.
- Columbus-America Discovery Group located and salvaged treasure from 1857 shipwreck of the SS Central America, using research by Dr. E. Lee Spence
- Odyssey Marine Exploration located and salvaged treasure from 1865 shipwreck of the SS Republic, using research by Dr. E. Lee Spence

== See also ==
- Black Swan Project
- Buried treasure
- Treasure map
- Geocaching
- List of missing treasures
- List of lost mines
- Marine salvage
- The Secret (treasure hunt)
- Treasure hunt (game)
- Leprechauns
