= Museum of Diving, Warsaw =

Museum in Warsaw, Poland

Coordinates: 52.2331°N 20.9811°E

Museum of Diving in Warsaw
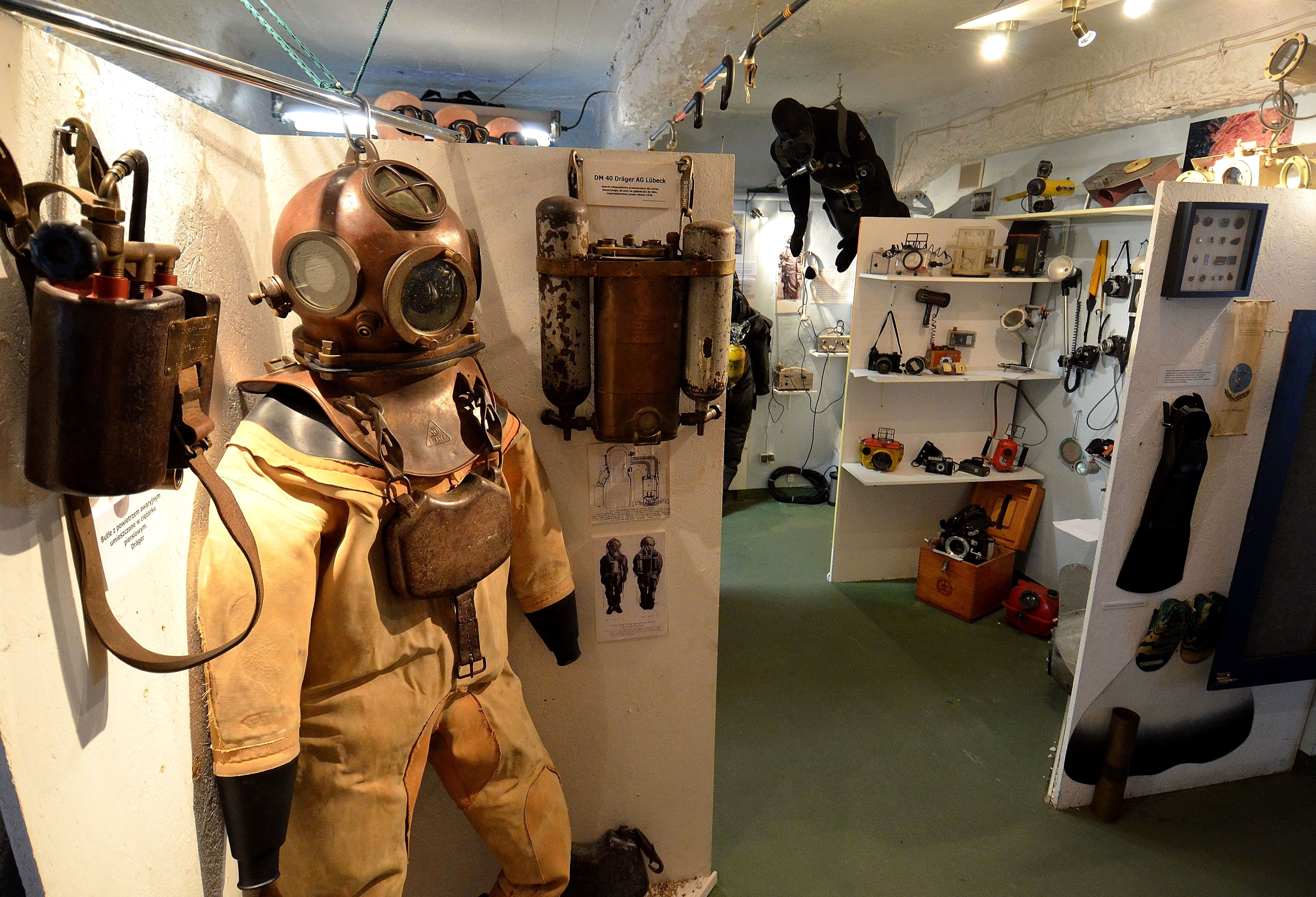
- Established: 27 February 2006
- Location: 88 Grzybowska Street; Warsaw, Poland
- Curator: Karina Kowalska
- Public transit access: Rondo Daszynskiego
- Website: www.muzeumnurkowania.pl

The Museum of Diving (Muzeum Nurkowania), located at 88 Grzybowska Street in Warsaw, was established in 2006 by Karina Kowalska from the Warsaw Diving Club (Warszawski Klub Płetwonurków).

== History ==
The museum was opened on 27 February 2006 marking the 50th anniversary of the establishment of the Warsaw Diving Club. It is the only such institution in Poland and one of the few in Europe.

It has a collection of around 900 objects associated with underwater diving and underwater archaeology. Its oldest exhibit is a diving helmet made in 1895. Another item of interest is a diving regulator used by members of the Austro-Hungarian Navy, thought to be the only surviving example of this type of equipment from this period. Many of the exhibits come from the private collections of members of the Warsaw Diving Club. The museum is divided into a number of areas, with exhibits focusing on Polish and Slovenian divers, the Kingdom of Yugoslavia, diving accidents, diving rescues from Submarines, underwater photography. There are a large number of diving suits on display from a variety of periods, alongside diving communication devices, underwater weapons, diving pumps, submarine models, and paintings of diving scenes. The museum aims to educate on the development of diving equipment and the experience of professional divers.

The museum have published a book on the subject of diving suits in Slovenia.

The museum holds monthly ‘Wednesday Movies’ nights, during which films about diving are shown.

== Bibliography ==
- Folga-Januszewska, Dorota (2012). Muzea Warszawy. Przewodnik. Olszanica: Wydawnictwo BOSZ. p. 57. ISBN 978-83-7576-159-7.
