= Anders Franzén =

Swedish marine technician and amateur naval archaeologist

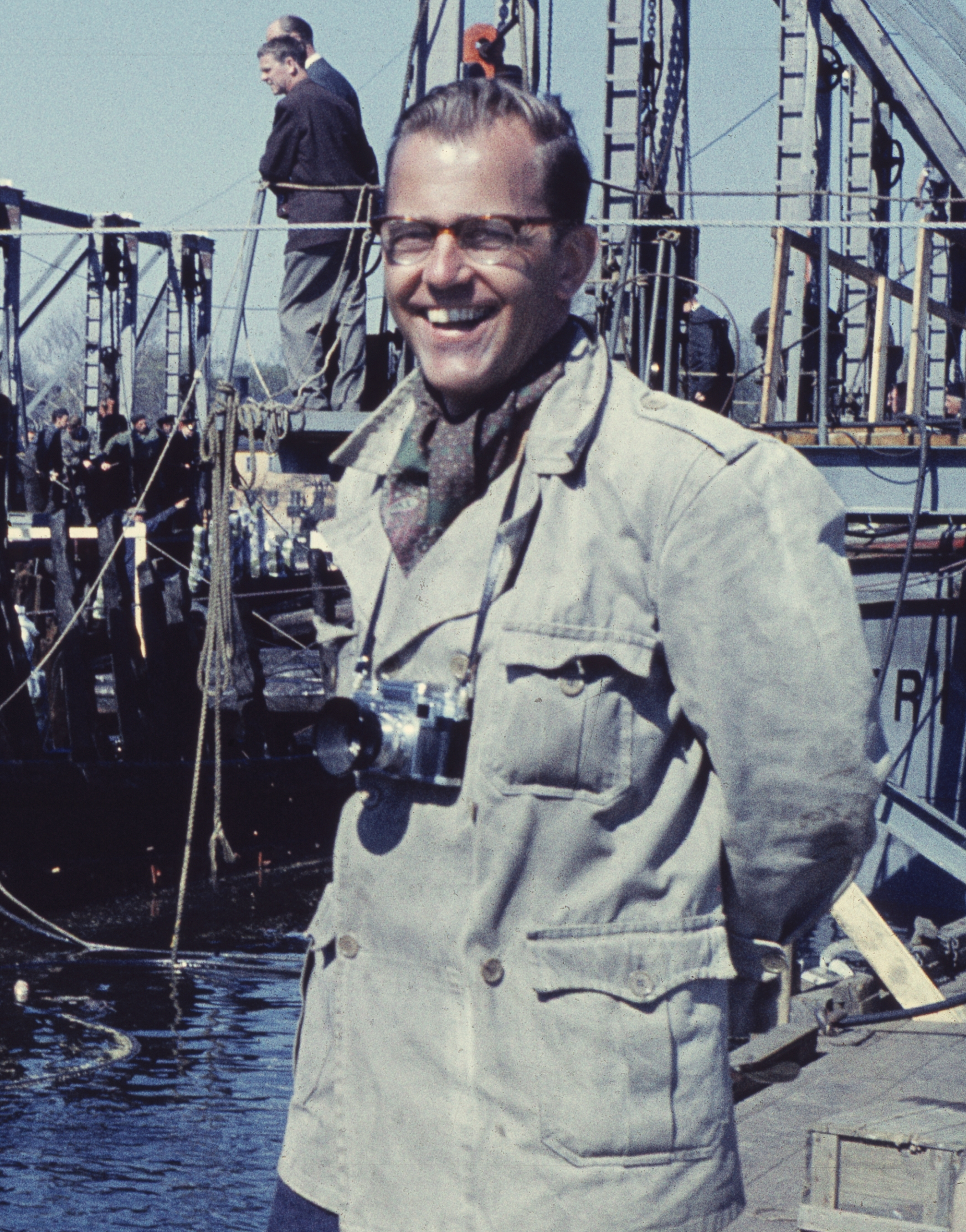
- Anders Franzén in 1961
- Born: 23 July 1918; Stockholm, Sweden
- Died: 8 December 1993 (aged 75); Stockholm, Sweden
- Occupations: marine technician and an amateur naval archaeologist
- Known for: Vasa, Kronan

Carl Gustaf Anders Franzén (23 July 1918 – 8 December 1993) was a Swedish marine technician and an amateur naval archaeologist. He is most famous for having located the 1628 wreck of the Swedish galleon Vasa in 1956 and participated in her salvage 1959–1961. He also participated in the exploration for the wrecks of Swedish warships Kronan, Riksäpplet and Resande Man as well as Gustav Vasa's flagship Lybska Svan.

== Biography ==
Franzén studied naval architecture at the Royal Institute of Technology (KTH), but instead developed a strong interest for history and never graduated. He took employment with BP and later changed to the Swedish Naval Administration (which was a single-service forerunner to the Defence Materiel Administration, FMV) where he became an expert on oil and fuels.

At the same time, Franzén was conducting amateur historical research in archives, where he was searching for information on old shipwrecks of the Swedish Navy. Early on, he had realised that in the brackish water conditions in Baltic Sea, wrecks of old wooden ships could survive without being attacked by shipworm. Around 1950 he had compiled a list of a dozen or so ships worth investigating further. From 1954, he focused his efforts on Vasa which he located in 1956 in Stockholm harbour. He combined his efforts with an experienced salvage diver Per Edvin Fälting (1911-1995).

Franzén had strained relations to the Maritime Museum, which for a long time seemed to regard Franzén as an unwelcome competitor, while the Swedish navy and the city of Stockholm were a lot more interested. Franzén never worked for the Maritime Museum, but was given a position at his alma mater KTH, which also recognised him with an honorary doctorate in 1983, KTH's Great Prize in 1988, and a personal title as professor (approved by the Swedish government) in 1992.

He was a founding member of the Sea Research Society and served on its Board of Advisors. In 1972 Franzén was awarded the Society's research/professional degree of Doctor of Marine Histories from the College of Marine Arts.

== Personal life ==
Franzén was married to Helena Grönquist. He died in Stockholm.
