= ADCI =

ADCI may refer to:

- Association of Diving Contractors International, a standards and certification body
- Acting or Assistant Director of Central Intelligence, a CIA position
- Acting Detective Chief Inspector, a police rank
