= Association of Diving Contractors International =

Non-profit organization for promoting standards and knowledge for commercial diving

- Formation: 1968; 58 years ago
- Type: Non-governmental organization
- Headquarters: 5206 Farm to Market 1960 Rd W 202, Houston, Texas, United States
- President: Don Wilkins
- Website: https://www.adc-int.org/

Association of Diving Contractors International, abbreviated as ADC or ADCI, is a non-profit organization devoted to promoting standards and issuing certifications for commercial diving skills.

== History ==
The ADCI was first established in 1968 by a number of small diving companies, contractors and professionals of underwater operations. Officially chartered in 1970, Its goal was to promote industry standards, safety practices, and education within the diving community. It was responsible for publishing Consensus Standards for Commercial Diving Operations, which, among other things, defined qualifications for its diving certifications as well as safety procedures in underwater activities. Its latest version, the 6.3 Revision of the Sixth Edition, was published in 2018.

In 1993, the ADCI began cosponsoring Underwater Intervention, an industry conference among professional divers, companies and organizations, along with Marine Technology Society ROV Committee.

Since 1994, the ADCI has been publishing bimonthly Underwater Magazine.

On October 9, 2003, ADCI signed a two-year cooperative agreement with the Occupational Safety and Health Administration, where they shared educational resources concerning diving activities, in an effort to improve the quality of both institutions' online and offline educational contents.

== Certifications ==
The ADCI currently offers the following certifications:

=== Divers ===
- Tender Diver
- Air Diver
- Mixed-Gas Diver
- Bell/Sat Diver

=== Supervisors ===
- Air Diving Supervisor
- Mixed Gas Diving Supervisor
- Bell/Sat Diving Supervisor
- Nitrox Endorsement
- Life Support Technician

The ADCI also accepts US naval training experience for some of its certifications.

== See also ==
- International Diving Institute – American commercial diver training school
- International Marine Contractors Association – International trade association for the marine contracting industry
