= College of Marine Arts =

Sea Research Society's formal higher education wing

Coordinates: 32°47′8″N 79°52′27″W

The College of Marine Arts was operated as the Sea Research Society's formal higher education wing from 1972 until 1978. It was initially located in Columbia, South Carolina and later moved to Mount Pleasant, outside of Charleston where it was housed in the former Berkeley County courthouse building on Pitt Street.

Sea Research Society's former College of Marine Arts building now serves as the City Hall for Mount Pleasant, South Carolina, photo by Jo Pinkard

Students participated in classroom workshops on history and artifact identification & conservation as well as in underwater archaeological projects on the wrecks of the Civil War blockade runners Georgiana, Mary Bowers and Constance as well as paleontological projects in the Cooper River and refuse sites in the Ashley River.

== Degrees ==
The College of Marine Arts awarded five doctorates in Marine Histories (DMH or MHD). They were issued for a combination of research and jure dignitatis. Recipients included Pablo Bush Romero of CEDAM, E. Lee Spence, Peter Throckmorton, Robert F. Marx, and Anders Franzén, each published historians, known for their important shipwreck discoveries and their pioneering work in underwater archaeology.
