= International Diving Institute =

American commercial diver training school

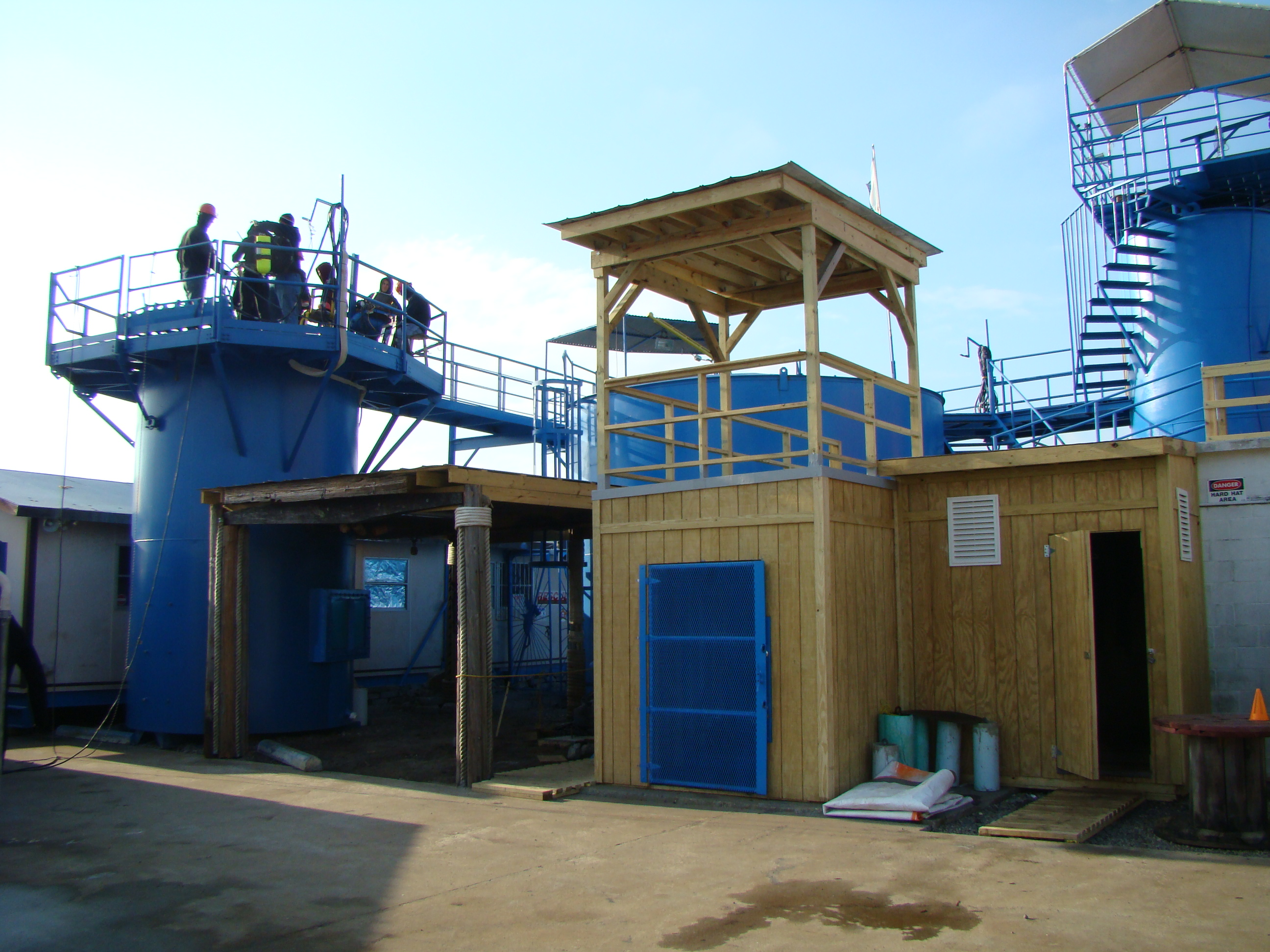
- Above ground, diver training tanks at IDI
- Formation: 2004
- Founded at: North Charleston, South Carolina, U.S.
- Purpose: Commercial diving training
- CEO: Carver Laraway
- Website: www.idicharleston.edu
- Formerly called: East Coast Dive Connection

The International Diving Institute (IDI) was a private, for-profit technical school in North Charleston, South Carolina. Originally a scuba diving shop called East Coast Dive Connection (ECDC), the school was founded in 2004 when it offered advanced dive training, especially in the use of surface supplied air, underwater welding, rigging and hyperbaric chamber operation, leading to a certification required for commercial divers working on oil platforms in the offshore oil industry and for diving operations in the United States that are regulated by the Occupational Safety and Health Administration.

== History ==
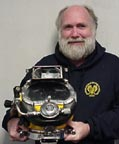
E. Lee Spence with KM17 Diving Helmet

In 1996, Sergio Smith, a former US Navy diver and member of its Seabee program, established a scuba diving shop called East Coast Dive Connection (ECDC), located in Summerville, South Carolina. The dive shop sold and serviced scuba gear and offered recreational scuba classes. The company was then turned into a school in 2004, establishing its campus in North Charleston, with underwater archaeologist E. Lee Spence as a co-owner, and retaining the Summerville location as a dive shop. In 2004, it was renamed to International Diving Institute and the underwater welding curriculum was added. Both Smith and Spence have served as instructors.

In 2016, 12 members of the Seabee Underwater Construction Team 2 (UCT 2) enrolled in IDI's wet welding course. Of the 12, only two people had previous experience in surface welding. In 2017, members of UCT 2's Construction Diving Detachment Alpha (CDDA) participated in the two-week underwater welding certification course.

== Governance ==
IDI was licensed by the South Carolina Commission on Higher Education as a non-degree occupational training institution.

IDI was one of fewer than a dozen professional diving schools operating in North America. It was a member of Association of Diving Contractors International and trained to the Standards published by the Association of Commercial Diving Educators, the American National Standards Institute, and the Sea Research Society.

== Admissions and school structure ==
Admission requirements were: 18 years or older, GED or high school diploma, US citizen, and passing a diving physical exam. Students were not required to have previous experience. Palmetto Business Daily reported that tuition was $18,100 for the 2017–18 year with 21 students enrolled.

== Curriculum ==
Student diver practices underwater welding at IDI

IDI offered programs in Air/Mixed Gas Surface Supplied Welding, Underwater Welding, HAZWOPER/HAZMAT for general and commercial diving, ROV pilot, Underwater Burning, and Diving Supervisor. Courses typically ran for 640 hours over 16 weeks, and met certifications for OSHA and commercial diving jobs. Of those hours, about half were classroom lecture and the other half were practical applications as required by Association of Dive Contractors International. Some additional training courses for certifications ran another two weeks. Training was done on-site in the wet tanks, at the dive stations in the Cooper River, and also nearby piers.

== Campus ==
IDI was situated at an old Navy base on the Cooper River in North Charleston, South Carolina. Its facilities included a two-story building with classrooms, offices, and work areas. Workshops included: metal fabrication, welding, a clean room for gas systems fabrication, and diesel compressor training area. There were hyperbaric chambers for compression/decompression. The school had three wet tanks. The main tank was 48,800 gallons and was 20 feet deep, and in 2009, a tube was appended to enable students to practice working in confined spaces. A second tank was used for installing in confined spaces with minimal visibility and also for rigging and hoisting. A third tank was used for wet welding. The school also had access to the Cooper River in which dive stations had been installed. The school had a dive shop that also serviced other divers besides the students.

== Notable staff ==
- E. Lee Spence
