= Sea Research Society =

American nonprofit for marine research

- Formation: 1972
- Type: Nonprofit
- Headquarters: South Carolina, U.S.
- President: E. Lee Spence
- Website: exploresrs.org

The Sea Research Society (SRS) is a non-profit organization promoting research and education in marine science and history. Founded in 1972 by underwater archaeologist E. Lee Spence, SRS undertakes archival research and underwater expeditions in search of historic shipwrecks. From 1972 to 1978, it also operated the College of Marine Arts.

== History ==
E. Lee Spence, an underwater explorer and early pioneer in the field of underwater archaeology, founded the Sea Research Society in 1972. In the early years, SRS was billed as a research college for marine sciences, including biology and archaeology, located in Mount Pleasant, South Carolina, near Charleston. In 1974, the SRS announced a temporary reduction in tuition at its College of Marine Arts from $1,500 to $500 per semester. At the time, College of Marine Arts students were involved in salvaging the Confederate cruiser SS Georgiana, which had been sunk en route to Charleston Harbor on March 19, 1863. Although local scholars were initially skeptical of Spence's efforts, they soon appreciated the significance of his activities and offered their assistance.

== Board members ==
Sea Research Society's former College of Marine Arts building now serves as the City Hall for Mount Pleasant, South Carolina, photo by Jo Pinkard

The Society's founding board members included Luis Marden of National Geographic magazine; Frederic Dumas, French underwater archaeologist of Jacques-Yves Cousteau fame; Anders Franzen, Swedish underwater archaeologist and discoverer of the Swedish warship Vasa; Ron A. Gibbs, Curator Armed Forces History, National Park Service; Paul Tzimoulis, Publisher, Skin Diver magazine; Ed Bearss, Senior Historian, National Park Service; Robert F. Marx, undersea explorer; E. Lee Spence, Underwater Archaeology Editor, NAUI's Diving World magazine; Peter Throckmorton, "discoverer of the oldest known shipwreck;" Pablo Bush Romero, President, CEDAM; and others of similar note. Virtually all were published authors and internationally known for their works with shipwrecks. Several have been described as the "father of underwater archaeology." A number of the founding members are now deceased.

Principal officers are Brad Needleman, President; E. Lee Spence, Executive Vice-President; Jim McNeill, VP-Arctic Expeditions; Veli Albert Kallio, VP-Environmental Affairs; and Rusty Whiting, International Training Director.

== General membership ==
SRS Membership is open to the general public.

== Expeditions ==
The Society has conducted numerous expeditions over the years including expeditions relating to the wrecks of the CSS David, SS Georgiana, SW Mary Bowers, SW Constance, USS Housatonic, the Confederate submarine Hunley, Norseman, CSS Sumter and others.

== Awards and Certificates by the Society ==
The Society gives out the following awards.

The "Peter Throckmorton Award" was created to recognize and honor those responsible for discoveries of shipwrecks with major historical and or archaeological importance.

The "Tom Mount & Sheck Exley Certificate for International Underwater Cave Exploration" was created to recognize and honor divers who have achieved 1000 or more safe cave dives but only when the dives are fully documented and spread over five or more countries.

== Tax status ==
The United States Internal Revenue Service (IRS) made a determination in May 1976 that Sea Research Society is a tax-exempt organization under regulation 501(c) of the Internal Revenue Code and donations are tax deductible for income reporting purposes under section 170 of the Code.

== College of Marine Arts ==
The Society operated its educational program under its College of Marine Arts (first in Columbia, SC, then in Mount Pleasant, SC) from 1972 until 1978. It awarded five doctorates jure dignitatis in Marine Histories (DMH or MHD). The Society (in conjunction with the International Diving Institute) is now offering a series of research, field and classroom courses leading to various levels of certification in underwater archaeology. The field programs offer students the opportunity to actually work on historic shipwrecks and other archaeological sites.

Some degrees are awarded jure dignitatis. That is, a person who has demonstrated the appropriate qualities to be given a particular office may be awarded the degree by virtue of the office held. It is another kind of earned—but not strictly academic—degree.
