= Mary Bowers (ship) =

Coordinates: 32°46′47″N 79°45′35″W

History
- Name: Mary Bowers
- Builder: Simons and Company, Renfrew, Scotland
- Cost: 22,682 pounds sterling
- Launched: 1864
- Captured: wrecked by accident, never captured
- Fate: abandoned after running onto the wreck of the Georgiana
- Status: Shipwreck discovered by E. Lee Spence at latitude 32°46'47" North, longitude 79°45'35" West
- Notes: owned in part by L.G. Bowers of Columbus, GA

General characteristics
- Class & type: blockade runner
- Tons burthen: 750 (220 tons register)
- Length: 226 ft (69 m)
- Beam: 25 ft (7.6 m)
- Draft: shallow
- Depth of hold: 10 ft 6 in (3.20 m)
- Propulsion: sidewheels and sail
- Sail plan: 2 masts
- Armament: none

The blockade runner Mary Bowers, Captain Jesse DeHorsey (or Horsey), bound from Bermuda to Charleston, South Carolina with an assorted cargo, struck the submerged wreck of the SS Georgiana in fourteen feet of water a mile off of Long Island (the present day Isle of Palms, South Carolina) on August 31, 1864. She "went on with such force as to make immense openings in her bottom," and she sank in a "few minutes, most of the officers and men saving only what they stood in." The steamer's passengers and crew escaped with the exception of a boy, Richard Jackson, who was left on the wreck and later taken off by the Federals.

The Mary Bowers was a large, shallow draft, sidewheel steamer of approximately 680 tons (also shown as 750 tons burden and 220 tons register). She measured 226'x25'x10'6" and was built by Simons and Company of Renfrew, Scotland. The steamer was owned in part by L.G. Bowers of Columbus, Georgia, and had been built at a cost of approximately £22,682 especially for the purpose of running the blockade.

The vessel was registered as owned by Henry Lafone. Her company owner was the Importing and Exporting Company of Georgia (which was sometimes called the Lamar Company). The Federals misidentified the blockade runner in their initial reports calling her the Mary Powers. The Federal boarding party took a bell and a few other items from the wreck. The Mary Bowers had made two previous successful attempts through the blockade, on one of which, she was chased by the U.S.S. R.G. Cuyler and had been forced to throw overboard sixty bales of cotton to escape.

On October 6, 1864, the wreck was subsequently run into by the blockade running, sidewheel steamer Constance Decimer, which was bound from Halifax, Nova Scotia, to Charleston.

== The wreck ==
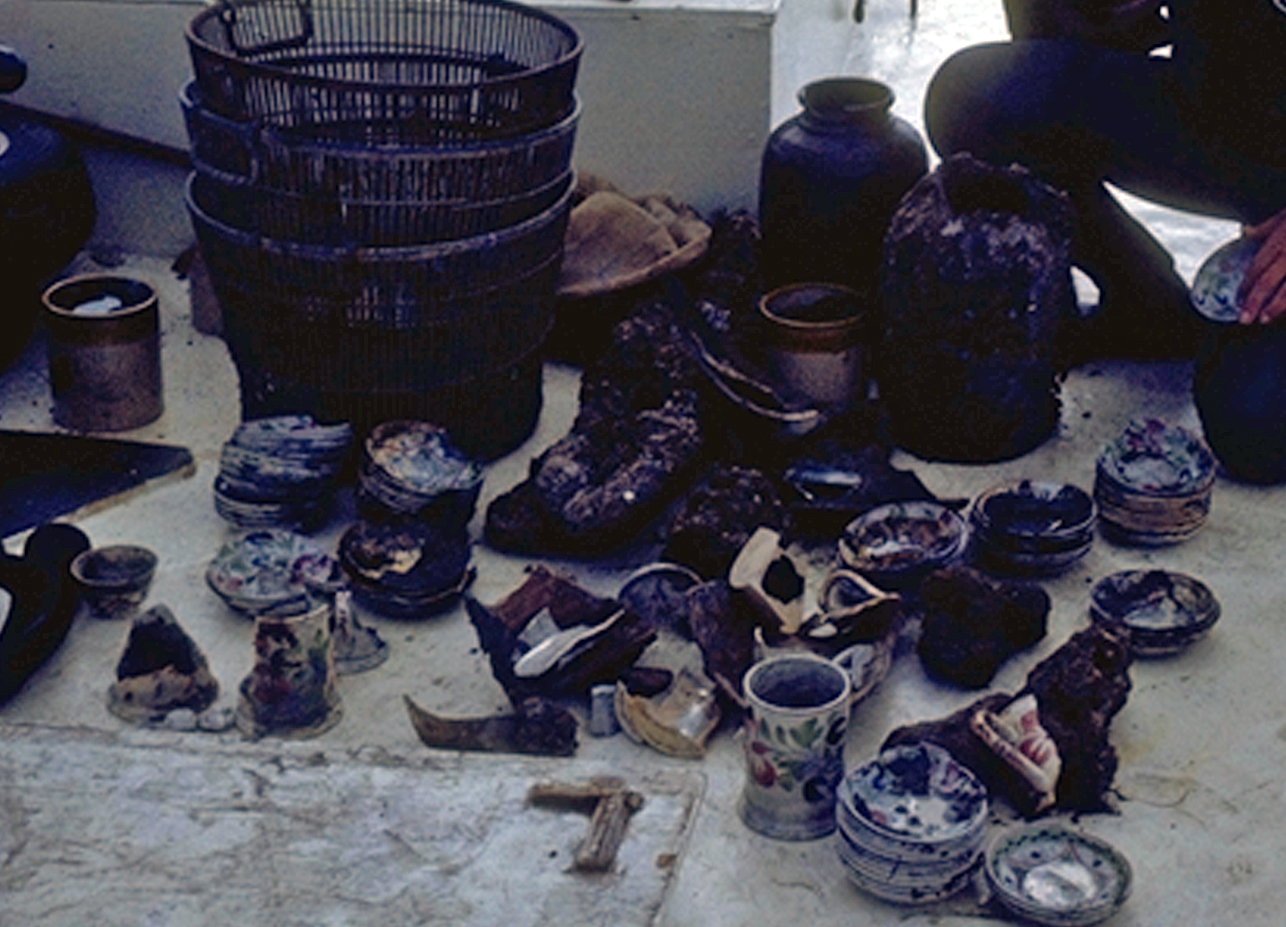
Artifacts from Georgiana/Mary Bowers wreck site, 1968 photo by Lee Spence

The remains of the sidewheel steamer Mary Bowers rest on and across the shattered wreckage of the Georgiana just forward of the first wreck's boiler.

The wreck was discovered by pioneer underwater archaeologist E. Lee Spence, who initially spotted the wreck from the air on March 19, 1965.

It was not until 1967, with the help of commercial fisherman Wally Shaffer and George Campsen Esq., that Spence formed Shipwrecks Inc. and actually began salvage operations on these wrecks. Shipwrecks Inc. was subsequently awarded the first salvage license issued under the state of South Carolina's shipwreck salvage law, which had been drafted by Spence and Campsen and passed by the South Carolina legislature.

== Site Importance ==
This wreck site is extremely important both historically and archaeology. Historically because of the emphasis both sides (the Confederates and the Federals) placed on the Georgiana as a potential threat to United States shipping, and archaeologically due to the nature of the site. It is also important in a literary sense because the Georgiana and her cargo were owned by George Alfred Trenholm, who was Treasurer of the Confederacy and has been identified as the real Rhett Butler in Gone With The Wind.

The site contains two distinct types of ships, both constructed of iron, but one built with extra reinforcing and relatively deep draft for operation as a privateer on the high seas and the other of extremely light weight and shallow draft that was perfectly suited for the purpose of running the blockade. One (the Georgiana) is a screw steamer and the other (the Mary Bowers) a sidewheel steamer. The two ships were built and lost less than two years apart, making their design differences even more significant.

Despite the site's obvious importance and even though a state salvage license had been granted and tens of thousands of artifacts were recovered from the Georgiana/Mary Bowers wreck site, no state official actually dove on the site to inspect it and/or verify the discovery for over 40 years.

== Bibliography ==
- Treasures of the Confederate Coast: The "Real Rhett Butler" & Other Revelations, by Dr. E. Lee Spence (Narwhal Press, Charleston/Miami, 1995, ISBN 1-886391-01-7, ISBN 1-886391-00-9, OCLC 32431590)
- Official Records of the Union and Confederate Navies in the War of the Rebellion, (Washington, DC, 1896), Series 1, Volume 3, pp. 121, 127
- Official Records of the Union and Confederate Navies in the War of the Rebellion, (Washington, DC, 1902), Series 1, Volume 15, pp. 658, 659, 660, 661, 670
- Official Records of the Union and Confederate Navies in the War of the Rebellion, (Washington, DC, 1903), Series 1, Volume 16, pp. 8, 34, 37
- "Salvaging the Cargo of the Mary Bowers," by E. Lee Spence, The Conference on Historic Site Archeology Papers 1969, (1971), Volume 4, part 1
- Lifeline of the Confederacy: Blockade Running During the Civil War, by Stephen R. Wise, (University of South Carolina, Columbia, SC, 1983), pp. 338, 341, 345, 368, 593, 594
- Charleston's Maritime Heritage 1670–1865, by P.C. Coker III, (CokerCraft Press, Charleston, SC, 1987), pp. 203, 214, 286, 304
- The Blockade Runners, by Dave Horner, (Florida Classics Library, Port Salerno, FL, 1992), Chapter 14, pp. 223, 225
