= Mark M. Newell =

British/American underwater and terrestrial archaeologist and anthropologist

Mark M. Newell, Ph.D. RPA is a British/American underwater and terrestrial archaeologist and anthropologist, the director of the Georgia Archaeological Institute. He received his doctorate from St. Andrews University, Scotland. Newell began diving in Bermuda in 1963. While working as a journalist, he continued to dive throughout the Caribbean and South America, developing an interest in the archaeological potential of the sites he discovered. In 1996 he completed a Ph.D. in underwater archaeology at the Scottish Institute of Maritime Studies at the University of St. Andrews.

== River craft ==
Since 1983 Newell has specialized in the recording of underwater sites and historic sea-going and river craft of the Southern United States. He built two full-sized reproductions of historic craft in South Carolina and Georgia, and developed the first typography of historic working craft of the waterways of South Carolina, North Carolina and Georgia.

== Proponent of sport diver education ==
A former diving instructor with the National Association of Scuba Diving Schools, Newell was an early proponent of sport diver education

== Wreck of the Dromedary ==
Avocational marine archaeologists, Chriss Addams and Mike Davis, recovered artifacts from the anchorage of the prison hulk Dromedary. The prison hulk been moored in the Naval Dockyard of Bermuda's Ireland Island in the mid-nineteenth century. Newell later reviewed data recorded by Addams and concluded that it was so competently gathered that it would support a master's degree in archaeology. With Newell's encouragement, Addams subsequently enrolled at the University of Ulster and completed an MSc in underwater archaeology using the Dromedary data. He is currently the only degreed underwater archaeologist working in Bermuda. The analysis of the Dromedary artifacts by Newell and Addams has provided unique insights into the lifeways of the hulk crew and inmates, their subsistence patterns and their economic activities. This work has now become the basis of a major exhibition on the British shipboard prison system staged by the Historic Houses Trust of New South Wales at Hyde Park Barracks. A new article by Addams on coin forgery aboard the Dromedary while stationed in Bermuda (Journal of the Numismatic Association of Australia, Vol 18) was recently awarded the prestigious Ray Jewell Medal for the best article from volumes 17 and 18.

== Wreck of the Resurgam ==
Newell participated in St. Andrews University's identification of the Resurgam, the world's first practical powered submarine. The Resurgam was discovered off Rhyl, Northern Wales, in 1995.

== Wreck of the Hunley ==
Dr. Newell initiated and directed the joint 1994/95 SCIAA/NUMA Hunley Expedition that most professional archaeologists credit with the discovery of the Hunley.

Newell's Hunley expedition was funded by best selling novelist Clive Cussler, who has claimed credit for the discovery. Newell, the project's official director, acknowledges basing his research and fieldwork, commencing in 1970, on the contributions of many other researchers from E. Lee Spence's alleged discovery decades earlier to members of the Sons of Confederate Veterans who all contributed to his project's ultimate success that concluded with the raising of the Hunley on August 8, 2000.

== Bibliography ==
"The Santee Canal Sanctuary," Part 1, edited by Joe J. Simmons and Mark M. Newell, 1989, South Carolina Institute of Archaeology and Anthropology, Columbia, South Carolina.

"What Really Happened to the CSS Hunley? Success and Tragedy in Maffitt's Channel" by Mark M. Newell, Alabama Heritage, Number 39, Winter 1996, p. 40

"Underwater Surveying" chapter of the "Archaeology Underwater The NAS Guide to Principles and Practice," published by the Nautical Archaeology Society.
