= E. Lee Spence =

American underwater archaeologist

- E. Lee Spence with a 22kt gold sword hilt.
- Born: Edward Lee Spence; November 1947 (age 78–79); Munich, Bavaria, Germany
- Citizenship: United States
- Education: University of South Carolina; College of Marine Arts
- Known for: Discovery of H. L. Hunley; Discovery of SS Georgiana; Discovery of the identity of the "real Rhett Butler"
- Awards: Donald O. Bushman Award
- Scientific career
- Fields: Underwater archaeology
- Workplaces: Sea Research Society International Diving Institute

Edward Lee Spence (born November 1947) is a German-born American archaeologist. He is a specialist in the field of underwater archaeology.

Between 1991 and 1992, Spence served as Chief of Underwater Archaeology for San Andres y Providencia. His work encompassed a variety of shipwrecks, including Spanish galleons, pirate ships, Great Lakes freighters, modern luxury liners, Civil War blockade runners, and submarines.

Spence held editorial and publishing roles in several magazines, including Diving World, Atlantic Coastal Diver, Treasure, Treasure Diver, Treasure Quest, ShipWrecks, and Wreck Diver. His published works in non-fiction reference books and photography have contributed to the field of underwater archaeology and the study of shipwreck exploration.

== Early life and education ==
Spence graduated from the University of South Carolina in 1976, where he obtained a Bachelor of Arts Degree in Interdisciplinary studies with an academic concentration in marine archaeology and was arrested for stealing several original Audubon bird books while studying at USC. Charges were dropped after he returned those books. He won the Donald O. Bushman Award in cartography. His doctorate is a Doctor of Marine Histories (DMH) from Sea Research Society's College of Marine Arts.

== Professional career ==
Spence is the current President and Chairman of the Board of the Sea Research Society. He is a past member of both the Board of Directors of the American Military Museum and Board of Directors of the Cardiovascular Research Institute of the Medical University of South Carolina in Charleston. He is a lifetime member of Mensa International and a former member of Intertel. Spence has an honorable discharge from the United States Army Reserve and has served as Commander and Vice Commander for Post #10 of the veteran's organization American Legion.

He is a founder, owner, and Vice President of the International Diving Institute, an organization that teaches and certifies commercial deep-sea divers.

== Discoveries ==
=== H. L. Hunley ===
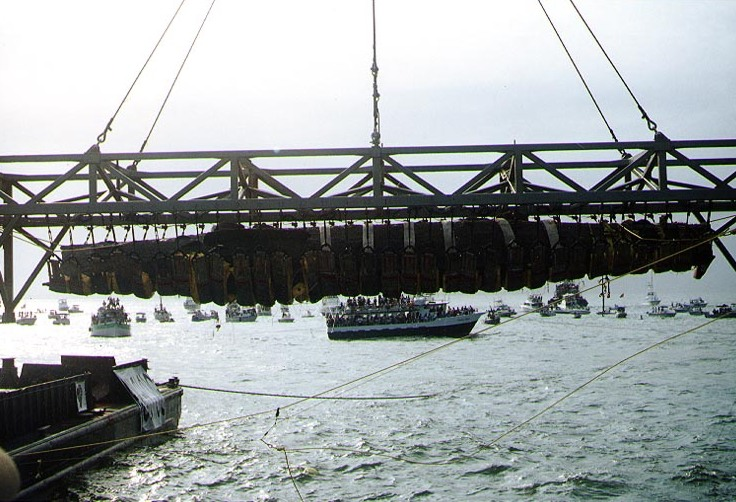
H. L. Hunley, suspended from a crane during its recovery from Charleston Harbor, August 8, 2000. (Photograph from the U.S. Naval Historical Center.)

Spence first reported the discovery of the Civil War submarine Hunley in 1970. He mapped and reported its location to numerous government agencies. The July 2007 cover story in U.S. News & World Report noted that the Hunley "disappeared without a trace" until 1970 when it was supposedly found by "underwater archaeologist E. Lee Spence."

On September 13, 1976, the National Park Service submitted Sea Research Society's (Spence's) location for H.L. Hunley for inclusion on the National Register of Historic Places. Spence's location for Hunley became a matter of public record when H.L. Hunley's placement on that list was officially approved on December 29, 1978, though many dives were made on that site, and the sub was never found.

Spence's book Treasures of the Confederate Coast, which had a chapter on his supposed discovery of Hunley and included a map complete with an "X" showing the wreck's location was published in January 1995.

In 1995, the discovery was independently verified by a combined South Carolina Institute of Archaeology and Anthropology (SCIAA) and National Underwater and Marine Agency (NUMA) expedition directed by SCIAA underwater archaeologist Mark M. Newell funded, in part, by novelist Clive Cussler. Later the same year, at the official request of Senator Glenn F. McConnell (chairman), of the State of South Carolina Hunley Commission, Spence donated all of his rights to the shipwreck to the State.

The Hunley discovery was described by William Dudley, Director of Naval History at the Naval Historical Center, as probably the most important (underwater archaeological) find of the (20th) century." The tiny submarine and its contents have been valued at over $40,000,000 making the discovery and donation one of the most significant and valuable contributions ever made to the State of South Carolina.

After a seven-year legal battle, in August 2008 novelist Clive Cussler's organization dropped a lawsuit that had been filed in federal district court against Spence in which it had claimed that they, and not Spence, had discovered the wreck in 1995. Both sides still claim that they, and not the other, discovered the wreck.

In 2016, the Naval History and Heritage Command published a detailed report on the history, discovery, and restoration of the Hunley entitled H. L. Hunley: Recovery Operations suggesting that it is most likely Spence found a nearby buried navigation buoy rather than the Hunley.

=== Other discoveries ===
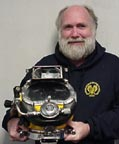
Spence with KM17 Diving Helmet

In addition to the Hunley, Spence has discovered several historically significant shipwrecks, including the SS Georgiana (said to have been the most powerful cruiser built by the Confederate States of America).

South Carolina's law protecting both the state's and the salvors' interests in shipwrecks was passed following Spence's discovery of the Georgiana and his company Shipwrecks Inc. was granted South Carolina State Salvage License #1.

Spence claims to have salvaged over $50,000,000 in valuable artifacts and has been responsible, through his archival research, for the locating of the wrecks of the side-paddle-wheel steamers Republic and Central America from which over one billion dollars in treasure has been recovered.

On April 4, 1989, Spence announced his discovery that Margaret Mitchell, who had claimed her Pulitzer Prize winning novel Gone with the Wind was pure fiction, had actually taken much of her compelling story of love, greed and war from real life. He claimed that Mitchell had actually based the character Rhett Butler on the life of George Alfred Trenholm, a shipping magnate from Charleston, South Carolina who had made millions of dollars from blockade running and was thrown in prison after the Civil War after being accused of making off with much of the Confederate treasury. Spence's literary discovery, that had its roots in his prior discoveries of some of Trenholm's wrecked blockade runners, made international news.

The Encyclopedia Of Civil War Shipwrecks by W. Craig Gaines additionally credits Spence with the discoveries of the following Civil War wrecks: the Constance (lost 1864, found 1967); Housatonic (lost 1864, found 1970); Keokuk (lost 1863, found 1971); Minho (lost 1862, found 1965); Presto (lost 1864, found 1967); Ruby (lost 1863, found 1966); Stonewall Jackson (lost 1863, found 1965). Spence's own books, as well as numerous third-party books, newspaper and magazine accounts, and archaeological reports detail his discoveries of the blockade runners Mary Bowers and Norseman and dozens of other ships of all types and nations in waters all over the world spanning a time period of over two thousand years.

In June 2013, Spence announced his discovery of the wreck of the SS Ozama, a steamer with a history of smuggling that wrecked off the South Carolina coast in 1894.

== Cartography ==
Spence is also a cartographer and has published a number of popular and archaeological (proximal, contour and conformant) maps and charts dealing with historical events, archaeology, shipwrecks and treasure.

- Shipwrecks of Hilton Head & Vicinity chart by Lee Spence, (Shipwreck Press, Sullivan's Island, S.C., 1980) OCLC: 15281285
- Shipwrecks of Wreck Valley : [New York City and Long Island regions] chart by E. Lee Spence (Shipwreck Press, Sullivan's Island, SC, 1990) OCLC: 40228884
- Shipwrecks of the Civil War : Charleston, South Carolina, 1861-1865 map by E. Lee Spence, (Shipwreck Press, Sullivan's Island, S.C., 1984) OCLC: 11214217
- Spence's Chart of Shipwrecks of Charleston, S.C.: over 250 wrecks map by E. Lee Spence (Shipwreck Press, Sullivan's Island, S.C., 1980) OCLC: 40228884
- Gold Bug: Treasure Chart, Edgar A. Poe by E. Lee Spence, (Sullivan's Island, SC: E. Lee Spence, 1981) OCLC: 49829303
- South Carolina Shipwrecks, 1520-1776 by E. Lee Spence (Charleston, S.C. : E. Lee Spence, 1976) OCLC: 6270298

== Bibliography ==
- The Hunley: Submarines, Sacrifice & Success in the Civil War by Mark Ragan (Narwhal Press, Charleston/Miami, 1995) ISBN 1-886391-43-2
- A Look at South Carolina's Underwater Heritage, by E. Lee Spence (Nelson Southern Printing, Charleston, S.C., 1974) OCLC: 11121049
- Treasures of the Confederate Coast: the "real Rhett Butler" & Other Revelations by Dr. E. Lee Spence, (Narwhal Press, Charleston/Miami, 1995) ISBN 1-886391-01-7, 1-886391-00-9, OCLC: 32431590
- Shipwreck Encyclopedia of the Civil War: South Carolina & Georgia, 1861–1865 by Edward Lee Spence (Sullivan's Island, S.C., Shipwreck Press, 1991) OCLC: 24420089
- Shipwrecks of South Carolina and Georgia : (includes Spence's List, 1520–1865) by E. Lee Spence, Sullivan's Island, S.C. (Sullivan's Island 29482, Sea Research Society, 1984) OCLC 10593079
- Shipwrecks, Pirates & Privateers: Sunken Treasures of the Upper South Carolina Coast, 1521–1865 by E. Lee Spence, (Narwhal Press, Charleston/Miami, 1995) ISBN 1-886391-07-6
- Spence's Guide to South Carolina : diving, 639 shipwrecks (1520–1813), saltwater sport fishing, recreational shrimping, crabbing, oystering, clamming, saltwater aquarium, 136 campgrounds, 281 boat landings by E. Lee Spence, (Nelson Southern Printing, Sullivan's Island, S.C.: Spence, 1976) OCLC: 2846435
- Wreck of the Georgiana, mystery ship of the Confederacy by E. Lee Spence, (Sullivan's Island, S.C. : Shipwreck Press, 1988) OCLC: 50414449
- Shipwrecks of Charleston Harbor by E. Lee Spence (Sullivan's Island, SC : Shipwreck Press, 1980) OCLC: 6908900
- Shipwrecks of the Era of the Revolution : South Carolina & Georgia, 1763–1783 by E. Lee Spence, (Sullivan's Island, SC : Shipwreck Press Inc., 1991) OCLC: 39977318
- Shipwrecks: "the magazine" edited by E. Lee Spence, (Sullivan's Island, S.C.: Shipwreck Press, 1989–1991, Narwhal Press 1995–) OCLC: 20784612
- On This Day (October 25, 1970) StarClique
- Financial Times, London, "First Person: E. Lee Spence," July 19, 2008
