= Resande Man =

Swedish warship

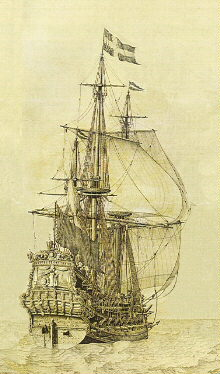

History

Sweden
- Fate: Sank on 26 November 1660

General characteristics
- Length: 27 m
- Armament: 22 guns

Resande Man was a Swedish warship that sank on 26 November 1660 in the Stockholm archipelago. Of the 62 people on board, 25 survived the sinking while 37 people died. The ship was 27 meters long and had 22 cannons. At the time of its sinking, it is thought to have been carrying ducats and jewels for the court of Prince Johan Casimir.

The wreck was thought to have been discovered in 2009, but the first news reports came in May 2012.
