= Keith Muckelroy =

British archaeologist

Keith Muckelroy (1951-1980) was a pioneer of maritime archaeology. Instead of the traditional particularist or historiographic approach used by maritime archaeologists, Muckelroy's ideas were new to the field, influenced by the prehistoric and analytical archaeology he learned under Grahame Clark and David Clarke at Cambridge, the tenets of processual archaeology gaining traction in the U.S., and his own experiences on shipwreck sites in British waters, notably the 1664 Dutch East Indiaman Kennemerland, several Spanish Armada wrecks, and the Mary Rose.

== Research, theories, and publications ==
In 1976, he published a paper in which he proposed a theory for the formation of shipwreck sites. He later expanded this and other theories in his seminal publication, a book titled Maritime Archaeology. With his discussion on shipwreck formation processes, he introduced terms such as "extracting filters" and "scrambling devices" into the lexicon, and used statistical models to clarify large bodies of data in order to discern patterns in the wrecking process, ideas that had never been proposed before. These ideas coincided nicely with processual archaeology's call for a more scientific, analytic methodology. Muckelroy's shipwreck formation theory became a classic model for interpretation of wreck sites and even today, either his original paper or his later book are referenced regularly in studies on the archaeology of shipwrecks.

Muckelroy's other prominent contribution was a three-part interpretive framework for better understanding the ship in its original social context. The three aspects he proposed were 1. The ship as a machine designed for harnessing a source of power in order to serve as a means of transport; 2. The ship as an element in a military or economic system, providing its basic raison d'être; and 3. The ship as a closed community, with its own hierarchy, customs, and conventions. This basic model has proven useful to many maritime archaeologists seeking to understand the role of ships as part of a greater cultural system.

Muckelroy also edited an atlas of underwater archaeological sites. His research covered the Kennemerland, Bronze Age cargoes and trade and terrestrial archaeology. He believed that archaeological research on more recent wrecks, such as early iron vessels and steamships, was a waste of time because more information on them could be gleaned from material in archives and in museums than from artifacts recovered from the seabed. This view is challenged by other maritime archaeologists.

His career was cut short on 8 September 1980 when he drowned in a diving accident in Loch Tay.

== The Keith Muckelroy Award ==
The Keith Muckelroy award is awarded biennially for the best published work in the preceding two years covering British maritime, nautical or underwater archaeology. Entries are eligible if they address work in Britain, Isle of Man, Jersey, Guernsey or British territorial waters. The award is given for work that best reflects the pioneering ideas and scholarly standards of Keith Muckelroy.

The award became part of the British Archaeological Awards in 2004 and is sponsored by the Keith Muckelroy Trust, The Maritime Affairs Group of the IFA, the Nautical Archaeology Society and the Maritime Committee of the Association of Local Government Archaeological Officers. Prior to 2004, the award had been given five times during the 1980s.

== Obituaries ==
- INA Quarterly, Vol 7.2/3 p3
- Mariner's Mirror vol 66.4 p292 (Joan du Plat Taylor)
- The Times, 13 September 1980 (Glyn Daniel)
- International Journal of Nautical Archaeology 1980 9(4):276 (Sean McGrail)
