= SS Georgiana =

Confederate steamboat

History

Confederate States
- Name: Georgiana
- Builder: Lawrie Shipyard, (subcontract with Laird?) Scotland
- Laid down: 1862
- Launched: 1863
- Commissioned: n/a
- Fate: Scuttled and burned to avoid capture, 19 March 1863
- Status: Shipwreck located by E. Lee Spence at 32°46′47″N 79°45′35″W
- Notes: Sunk on maiden voyage before her guns were mounted, described as designed to become the "most powerful" Confederate cruiser.

General characteristics
- Class & type: Reportedly built to serve as a cruiser or a privateer
- Tonnage: 519 GRT; 407 NRT
- Length: 205 ft 6 in (62.64 m)
- Beam: 25 ft 2 in (7.67 m)
- Draft: 14 ft 0 in (4.27 m) forward, 15 ft 0 in (4.57 m) aft also reported as 1 foot 6 inches (0.46 m)
- Depth of hold: 14 feet 9 inches (4.50 m)
- Propulsion: steam screw, variously reported 120 to 250 horsepower (89 to 186 kW), and capable of 12 to 17 knots (22 to 31 km/h)
- Sail plan: brig
- Complement: reported as 140 men
- Armament: reported as 2 heavy guns mounted on deck and "pierced for either fourteen or twenty guns"
- Notes: iron hull, 3 bulkheads, figurehead of a demi-woman

The Georgiana was a brig-rigged, iron hulled, propeller steamer belonging to the Confederate States Navy during the American Civil War. Reputedly intended to become the "most powerful" cruiser in the Confederate fleet once her guns were mounted, she was never used in battle. On her maiden voyage from Scotland, where she was built, she encountered Union Navy ships engaged in a blockade of Charleston, South Carolina, and was heavily damaged before being scuttled by her captain. The wreck was discovered in 1965 and lies in the shallow waters of Charleston's harbor.

Due to the secrecy surrounding the vessel's construction, loading and sailing, there has been much speculation about her intended role, whether as a cruiser, merchantman, or privateer.

== Specifications ==
Georgiana was a brig-rigged, iron hulled, propeller steamer of 120 horsepower (89 kW) with a jib and two heavily raked masts, hull and stack painted black. Her clipper bow sported the figurehead of a "demi-woman". Georgiana was reportedly pierced for fourteen guns and could carry more than four hundred tons of cargo. She was built by the Lawrie shipyard at Glasgow – perhaps under subcontract from Lairds of Birkenhead (Liverpool) – and registered at that port in December 1862 as belonging to N. Matheson's Clyde service. The U.S. Consul at Tenerife was rightly apprehensive of her as being "evidently a very swift vessel."

Captain Thomas Turner, station commodore, reported to Admiral S. F. du Pont that Georgiana was evidently "sent into Charleston to receive her officers, to be fitted out as a cruiser there. She had 140 men on board, with an armament of guns and gun carriages in her hold, commanded by a British naval retired officer."

== Loss ==
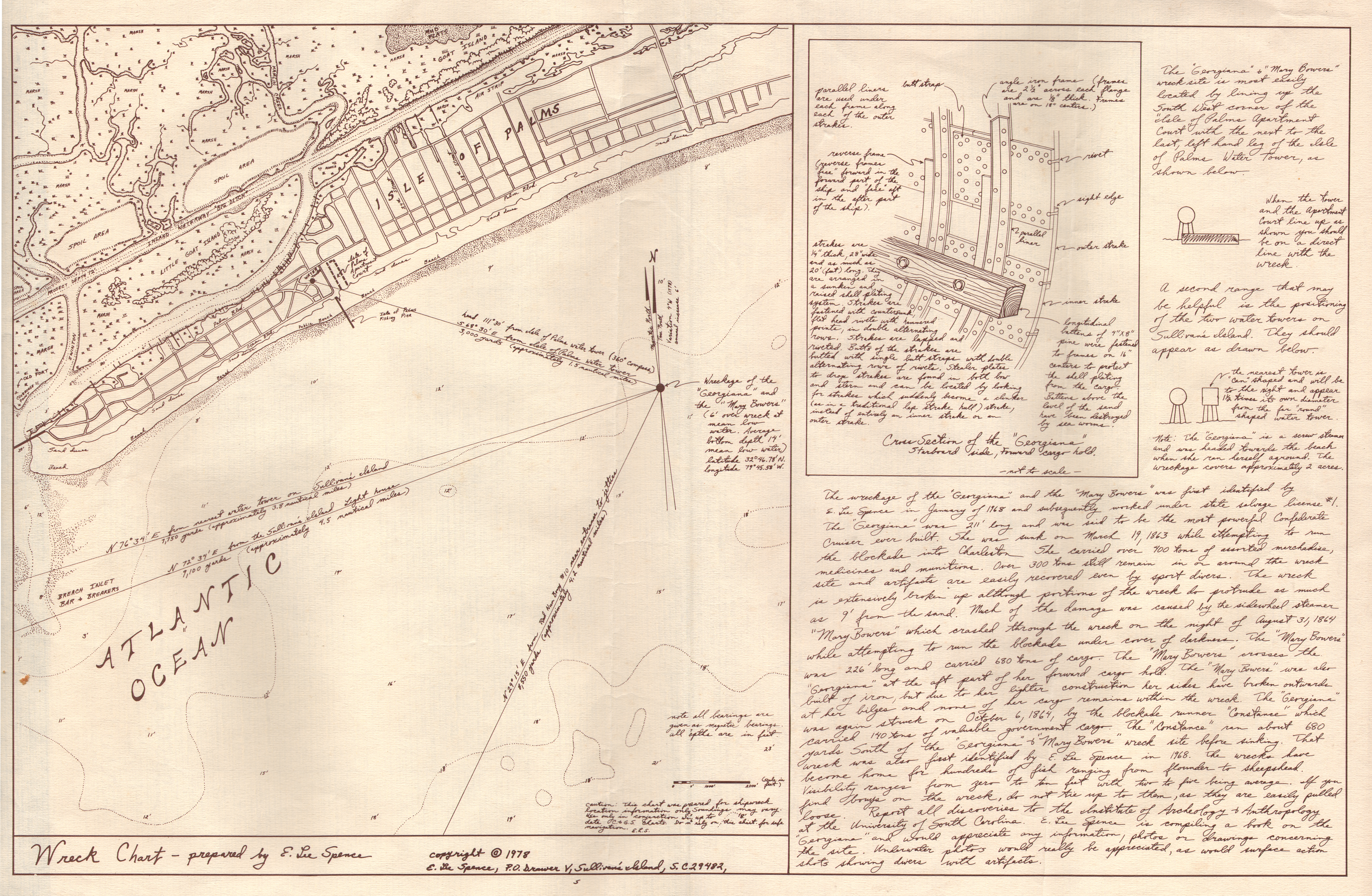
Wreck Chart by E. Lee Spence showing the location and a cross section of the wreck of the Georgiana

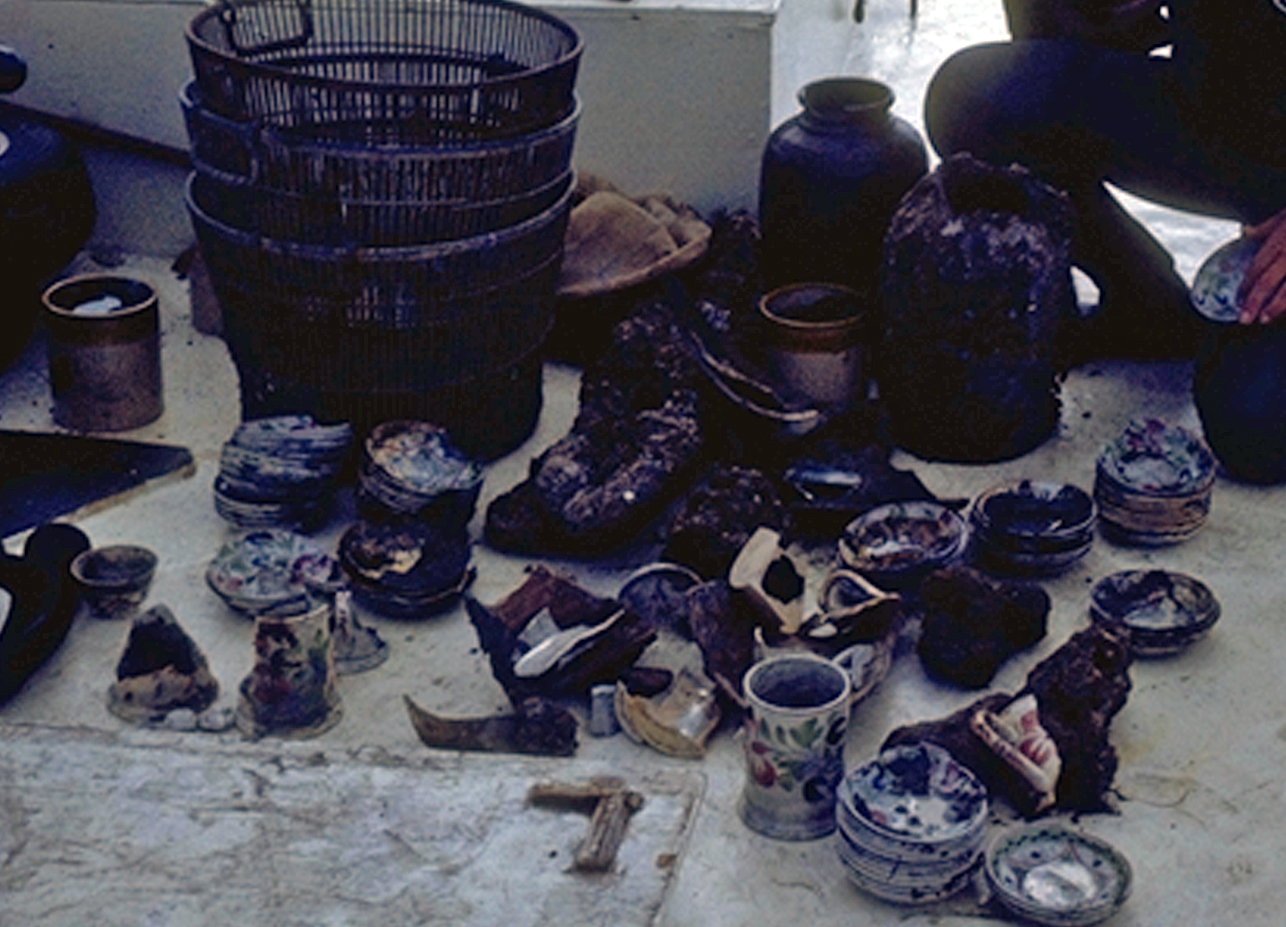
Artifacts recovered from the wrecks of Georgiana and Mary Bowers

The Georgiana was lost on the night of 19 March 1863, while attempting to run past the Federal Blockading Squadron and into Charleston, South Carolina. She had been spotted by the armed U.S. Yacht America (of the famed America's Cup racing trophy) which alerted the remainder of the blockade fleet by shooting up colored signal flares. The Georgiana was sunk after a desperate chase in which she came so close to the big guns aboard the USS Wissahickon that her crew even heard the orders being given on the U.S. vessel. With solid shot passing entirely though her hull, her propeller and rudder damaged, and with no hope for escape, Capt. A. B. Davidson flashed a white light in token of surrender, thus gaining time to beach his ship in fourteen feet (4.3 m) of water, three-quarters of a mile (1200 m) from shore and, after first scuttling her, escaped on the land side with all hands; this was construed as "the most consummate treachery" by the disappointed blockading crew, who would have shared in the proceeds from the prize.

Lt. Comdr. John L. Davis, commanding Wissahickon decided to set the wreck afire lest guerrilla bands from shore try to salvage her or her cargo: she burned for several days accompanied by large black powder explosions.

Georgiana and her cargo were owned by banking and shipping magnate George Trenholm of Charleston, who was Treasurer of the Confederacy and the primary historical figure behind the fictional Rhett Butler in Gone With The Wind.

== Discovery ==
The wreck was discovered by underwater archaeologist E. Lee Spence in 1965.

Today the Georgiana sits on the bottom with her huge boiler only five feet (1.5 m) under the surface. She is now covered with a wide array of sea fan, sea whips, and living corals. Large sections of the hull are still intact. In places the starboard side of the hull protrudes over nine feet (2.7 m) from the sand.

The ship's deck was white pine and has long since been eaten away. Sea urchins and sea anemones abound on the wreck. The wreck is frequented by sea bass, grouper, flounder, stingrays, seahorses, and toadfish.

Near the forward cargo hatch Spence found boxes of pins and buttons. Spence recovered sundries, munitions, and medicines easily worth over $12 million (equivalent to $123 million in 2025) but he never found the 350 pounds (160 kg) of gold believed to be hidden on the wreck. The gold could have a numismatic value of over $15 million (equivalent to $153 million in 2025) . Other cargo could bring the Georgiana's total value to $50 million (equivalent to $511 million in 2025).

Resting on top of the Georgiana's shattered wreckage is the remains of the sidewheel steamer Mary Bowers, which struck the wreck of the Georgiana while attempting to run the blockade into Charleston.

== Wreck site ==
This wreck site is extremely important both historically and archaeologically. Historically because of the emphasis both sides (the Confederates and the Federals) correctly or incorrectly placed on the Georgiana as a potential threat to United States shipping, and archaeologically due to the site containing two distinct types of ships. Both ships were constructed of iron, but one was built with extra reinforcing and relatively deep draft such as would be needed for operation as a privateer on the high seas and the other of extremely light weight and shallow draft that was perfectly suited for the purpose of running the blockade, which required crossing shallow shoals to evade the deeper draft vessels of the blockade fleet. One (the Georgiana) is a screw steamer and the other (the Mary Bowers) a sidewheel steamer. The two ships were built and lost in a time span of about two years, making their design differences even more significant.

It was for the Georgiana/Mary Bowers wreck that the first salvage license in South Carolina was granted in 1967. Hundreds of thousands of individual artifacts were recovered from the site. The first dives by State officials on the site were made in 2010.

== Confederate Cruiser, Privateer or Merchantman? ==
Due to the secrecy surrounding her construction, loading and sailing, there is considerable question as to whether the Georgiana was simply a merchantman or if she was intended as a privateer or blockade runner.

One contemporary report described the Georgiana as so lightly built that "she would shake from stem to stern if a gun were fired from her decks." Historian Stephen Wise describes her as a merchantman and writes "While loading in Liverpool, the Union consul Thomas Dudley carefully investigated the vessel and reported her to be too frail for a warship. He felt her only purpose was to run the blockade." A United States consular dispatch dated 6 January 1863 stated: "The steamer Georgiana, just arrived at Liverpool from the Clyde. She is new and said to be a very superior steamer. ··· Yesterday while lying here she had the Rebel flag flying at her mast." The London American took special note of her in its 28 January 1863 edition as a powerful steamer and remarked that her officers wore gold lace on their caps, considered a sure indication she was being groomed for a man-of-war.

After the Georgiana's loss on 19 March 1863, the United States Secretary of Navy wrote: "the destruction of the Georgiana not only touched their (the Confederate's) pockets, but their hopes. She was a splendid craft, peculiarly fitted for the business of privateering." The New York Times of 31 March 1863 gave a spy's description of the craft as "a superior vessel, ··· built expressly for the rebel navy." The spy reported that she was "altogether a faster, stauncher, and better vessel than either the Oreto (Florida) or Alabama." The London Times of 8 April 1863 described her as follows: "There is not the least doubt of her being intended as a privateer." Thomas Scharf (who had served in the Confederate navy), in his post-war reference work History of the Confederate Navy, stated: "Apart from her cargo, the loss was a serious one to the Confederacy, as she was a much faster and stronger ship than any one of its cruisers afloat and would have made a superb man-of-war." Underwater archaeologist E. Lee Spence, who discovered the wreck and identified it as the Georgiana, believes that she was indeed intended as a privateer or cruiser due to the naval guns found aboard, her deep draft hull construction, her heavier than standard iron planking, and the closer than normal, doubled up, Z-beam, framing used throughout the vessel.

== See also ==
- Confederate States Navy
- Blockade runners of the American Civil War

== Bibliography ==
- Spence's Guide to South Carolina, by E. Lee Spence (Nelson Printing, Charleston, SC, 1976, OCLC 2846435), pp. 1–5
- Treasures of the Confederate Coast: The "Real Rhett Butler" & Other Revelations, by Dr. E. Lee Spence (Narwhal Press, Charleston/Miami, 1995, ISBN 1-886391-01-7, 1-886391-00-9, OCLC 32431590)
- "Wreck Chart," map by E. Lee Spence (Shipwreck Press, Sullivan's Island, SC, 1978, OCLC 6270166)
- Shipwrecks of South Carolina and Georgia, 1520–1865, by E. Lee Spence (Sea Research Society, 1984, OCLC 10593079), pp. 47–55, 634, 635, 656, 657, 722–736
- "The Confederate Navy in Europe", Warren F Spencer ULAP, p. 66 ISBN 0-8173-0861-X
- A Look at South Carolina’s Underwater Heritage, by E. Lee Spence, (Nelson Southern Printing, Charleston, SC, 1974), pp. 6–9
- Spence’s Guide to South Carolina, by E. Lee Spence, (Nelson Southern Printing, Charleston, SC, 1976), pp. 1–5
- Lifeline of the Confederacy: Blockade Running During the Civil War, by Stephen R. Wise, (University of South Carolina, Columbia, SC, 1983), pp. 226, 229–232, 568, 569
- Charleston’s Maritime Heritage 1670–1865, by P.C. Coker III, (CokerCraft Press, Charleston, SC, 1987), pp. 214, 274, 286, 303
- Warships of the Civil War Navies, by Paul H. Silverstone, (Naval Institute Press, Annapolis, MD, 1989), p. 212
- The Blockade Runners, by Dave Horner, (Florida Classics Library, Port Salerno, FL, 1992), Chapter 14, pp. 207–209, 223, 225
