= Underwater archaeology =

Study of human activity via evidence found underwater

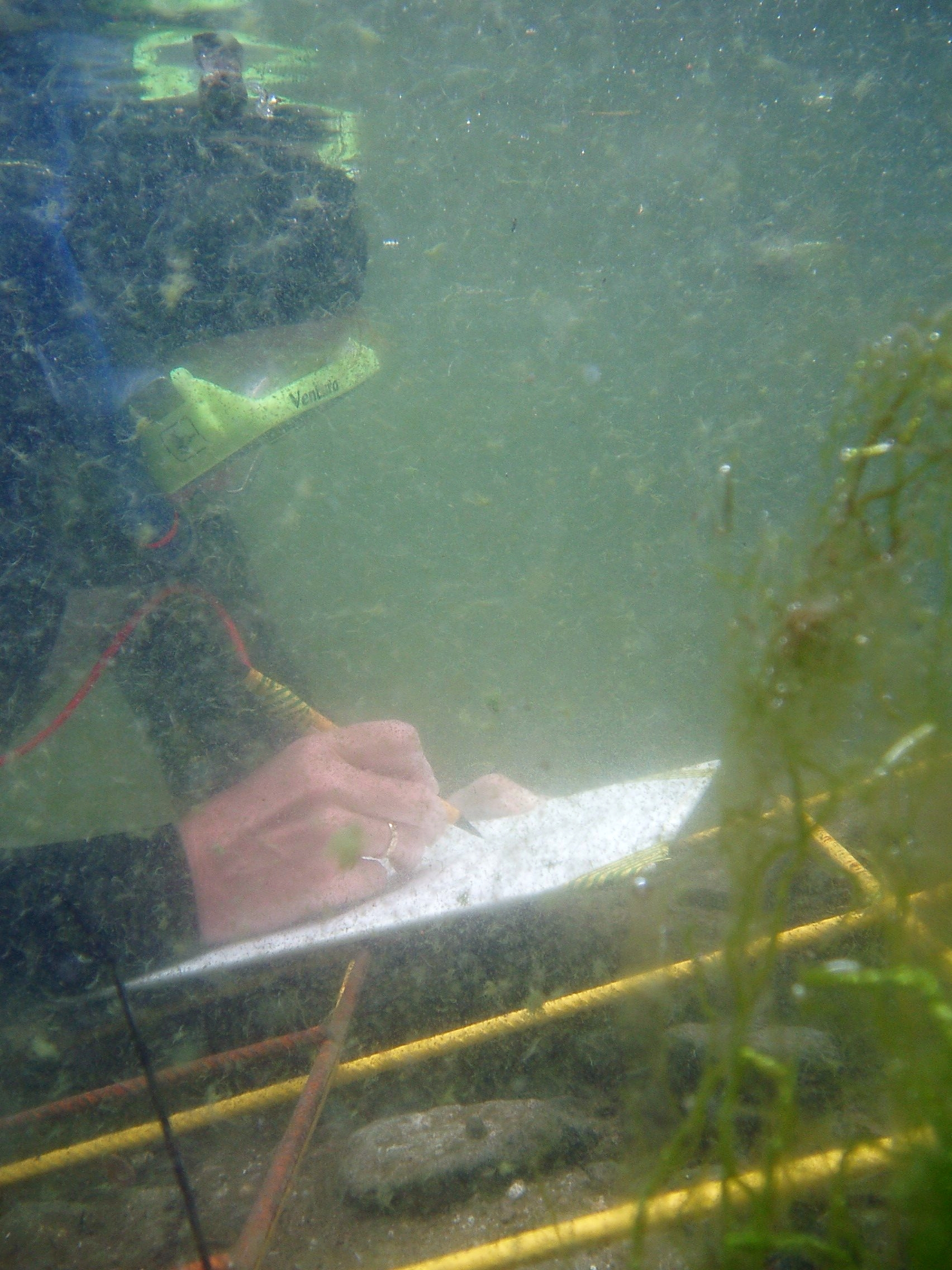
Drawing to scale, underwater

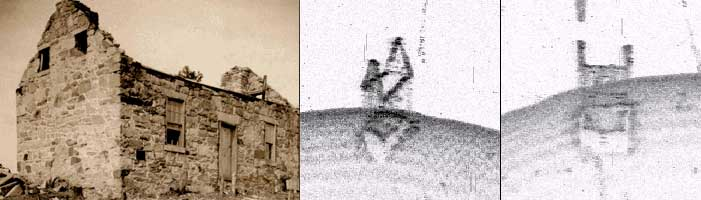
Rock house settlement seen on left in 1927 while Lake Murray (South Carolina) was under construction, middle and right are two angles of aspect on Side-scan sonar in 100 ft of fresh water under the lake in 2005

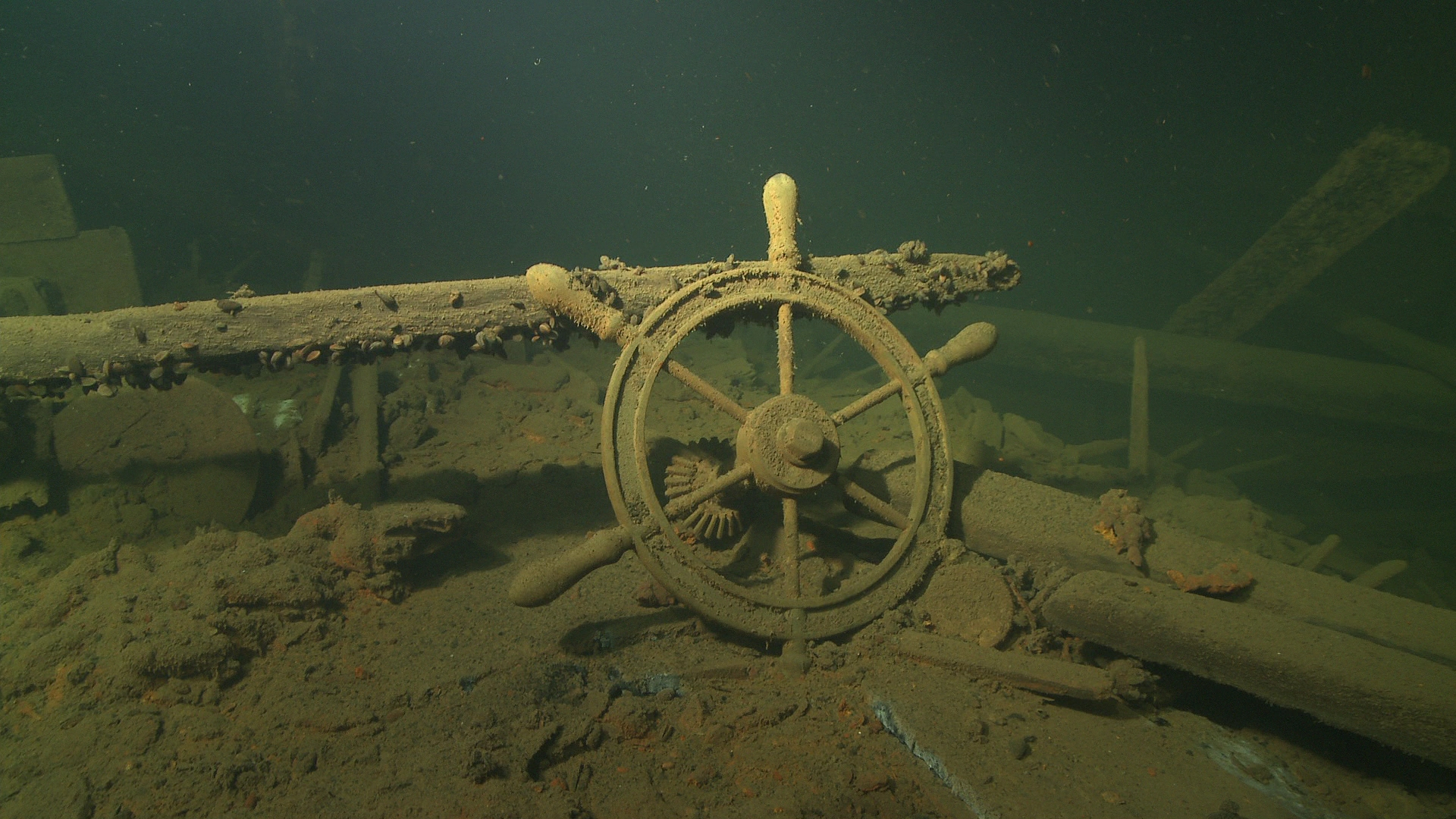
The wreck of E. Russ in Estonia is considered a national heritage monument.

Underwater archaeology is archaeology practiced underwater. As with all other branches of archaeology, it evolved from its roots in pre-history and in the classical era to include sites from the historical and industrial eras.

Its acceptance has been a relatively late development due to the difficulties of accessing and working underwater sites, and because the application of archaeology to underwater sites initially emerged from the skills and tools developed by shipwreck salvagers. As a result, underwater archaeology initially struggled to establish itself as actual archaeological research. This changed when universities began teaching the subject and a theoretical and practical base for the sub-discipline was firmly established in the late 1980s.

Underwater archaeology now has a number of branches including, maritime archaeology: the scientifically based study of past human life, behaviors and cultures and their activities in, on, around and (lately) under the sea, estuaries and rivers. This is most often effected using the physical remains found in, around or under salt or fresh water or buried beneath water-logged sediment. In recent years, the study of submerged WWII sites and of submerged aircraft in the form of underwater aviation archaeology have also emerged as bona fide activity.

Though often mistaken as such, underwater archaeology is not restricted to the study of shipwrecks. Changes in sea level because of local seismic events such as the earthquakes that devastated Port Royal and Alexandria or more widespread climatic changes on a continental scale mean that some sites of human occupation that were once on dry land are now submerged. At the end of the last ice age, the North Sea was a great plain, and anthropological material, as well as the remains of animals such as mammoths, are sometimes recovered by trawlers. Also, because human societies have always made use of water, sometimes the remains of structures that these societies built underwater still exist (such as the foundations of crannogs, bridges and harbors) when traces on dry land have been lost. As a result, underwater archaeological sites cover a vast range including: submerged indigenous sites and places where people once lived or visited that have been subsequently covered by water due to rising sea levels; wells, cenotes, wrecks (shipwrecks; aircraft); the remains of structures created in water (such as crannogs, bridges or harbors); other port-related structures; refuse or debris sites where people disposed of their waste, garbage and other items, such as ships, aircraft, munitions and machinery, by dumping into the water.

Underwater archaeology is often complementary to archaeological research on terrestrial sites because the two are often linked by many and various elements including geographic, social, political, economic and other considerations. As a result, a study of an archaeological landscape can involve a multidisciplinary approach requiring the inclusion of many specialists from a variety of disciplines including prehistory, historical archaeology, maritime archaeology, and anthropology. There are many examples. One is the wreck of the VOC ship Zuytdorp lost in 1711 on the coast of Western Australia, where there remains considerable speculation that some of the crew survived and, after establishing themselves on shore, intermixed with indigenous tribes from the area. The archaeological signature at this site also now extends into the interaction between indigenous people and the European pastoralists who entered the area in the mid-19th century.

== Research potential ==
There are many reasons why underwater archaeology can make a significant contribution to our knowledge of the past. In the shipwreck field alone, individual shipwrecks can be of significant historical importance either because of the magnitude of loss of life (such as the Titanic) or circumstances of loss (Housatonic was the first vessel in history sunk by an enemy submarine). Shipwrecks such as Mary Rose can also be important for archaeology because they can form a kind of accidental time capsule, preserving an assemblage of human artifacts at the moment in time when the ship was lost.

Sometimes it is not the wrecking of the ship that is important, but the fact that we have access to the remains of it, especially where the vessel was of major importance and significance in the history of science and engineering (or warfare), due to being the first of its type of vessel. The development of submarines, for example, can be traced via underwater archaeological research, via the Hunley, which was the first submarine to sink an enemy ship (Hunley also had unique construction details not found in previous vessels and was one of the few historic warships ever raised intact); the Resurgam II, the first powered submarine; and Holland 5, which provides insight into the development of submarines in the British Navy.

== UNESCO Convention ==
All traces of human existence underwater which are one hundred years old or more are protected by the UNESCO Convention on the Protection of the Underwater Cultural Heritage. This convention aims at preventing the destruction or loss of historic and cultural information and looting. It helps states parties to protect their underwater cultural heritage with an international legal framework. On the basis of the recommendations defined in the above-mentioned UNESCO Convention various European projects have been funded such as the CoMAS project for in situ conservation planning of underwater archaeological artefacts.*Bruno, F.; Muzzupappa, M.; Lagudi, A.; Gallo, A.; Spadafora, F.; Ritacco, G.; Angilica, A.; Barbieri, L.; Di Lecce, N.; Saviozzi, G.; Laschi, C.; Guida, R.; Di Stefano, G. (2015). A ROV for supporting the planned maintenance in underwater archaeological sites. MTS/IEEE OCEANS 2015 -. Genova: Discovering Sustainable Ocean Energy for a New World. pp. 1–7. doi:10.1109/OCEANS-Genova.2015.7271602.

== Challenges ==
Underwater sites are inevitably difficult to access, and more hazardous, compared with working on dry land. In order to access the site directly, diving equipment and diving skills are necessary. The depths that can be accessed by divers, and the length of time available at depths, are limited. For deep sites beyond the reach of divers, submersibles or remote sensing equipment are needed.

For a marine site, while some form of working platform (typically a boat or ship) is often needed, shore-based activities are common. Notwithstanding, underwater archaeology is a field plagued by logistics problems. A working platform for underwater archaeology needs to be equipped to provide for the delivery of air for example, recompression and medical facilities, or specialist remote sensing equipment, analysis of archaeological results, support for activities being undertaken in the water, storage of supplies, facilities for conservation for any items recovered from the water, as well as accommodation for workers. Equipment used for archaeological investigation, including water dredge and airlifts create additional hazards and logistics issues. Moreover, marine sites may be subject to strong tidal flows or poor weather which mean that the site is only accessible for a limited amount of time. Some marine creatures also pose a threat to diver safety.

Underwater sites are often dynamic, that is they are subject to movement by currents, surf, storm damage or tidal flows. Structures may be unexpectedly uncovered, or buried beneath sediments. Over time, exposed structures will be eroded, broken up and scattered. The dynamic nature of the environment may make in-situ conservation infeasible, especially as exposed organics, such as the wood of a shipwreck, are likely to be consumed by marine organisms such as piddocks. In addition, underwater sites can be chemically active, with the result that iron can be leached from metal structures to form concretions. The original metal will then be left in a fragile state. Artifacts recovered from underwater sites need special care.

Visibility may be poor, because of sediments or algae in the water and lack of light penetration. This means that survey techniques that work well on land (such as triangulation), generally can not be used effectively under water.

In addition it can be difficult to allow access to the results of the archaeological research as underwater sites do not provide good outreach possibilities or access for the general public. Work has been done to bridge this difficulty through the use of the World Wide Web for webcasting projects, or dedicated virtual reality systems that allow users to perform a virtual diving into an interactive 3D reconstruction of the underwater archaeological site. An example is the excavation of the Queen Anne's Revenge and the QAR DiveLive program, a live interactive virtual field trip to the wrecksite.

== Techniques ==
Although specialized techniques and tools have been developed to address the challenges of working under water, the archaeological goals and process are essentially the same as in any other context. Investigating an underwater site however, is likely to take longer and be more costly than an equivalent terrestrial one.

An important aspect of project design is likely to be managing the logistics of operating from a boat and of managing diving operations. The depth of water over the site, and whether access is constrained by tides, currents and adverse weather conditions will create substantial constraints on the techniques that can feasibly be used and the amount of investigation that can be carried out for a given cost or in a set timescale. Many of the most carefully investigated sites, including the Mary Rose have relied substantially on avocational archaeologists working over a considerable period of time.

As with archaeology on land, some techniques are essentially manual, using simple equipment (generally relying on the efforts of one or more scuba divers), while others use advanced technology and more complex logistics (for example requiring a large support vessel, with equipment handling cranes, underwater communication and computer visualization).

=== Position fixing ===
Knowing the location of an archaeological site is fundamental to being able to study it. In the open sea there are no landmarks, so position fixing is generally achieved using GPS. Historically, sites within sight of the shore would have been located using transects. A site may also be located by visually surveying some form of marker (such as a buoy) from two known (mapped) points on land. The depth of water at a site can be determined from charts or by using the depth sounding sonar equipment that is standard equipment on ships. Such sonar can often be used to locate an upstanding structure, such as a shipwreck, once GPS has placed the research vessel in approximately the right location.

=== Site survey ===
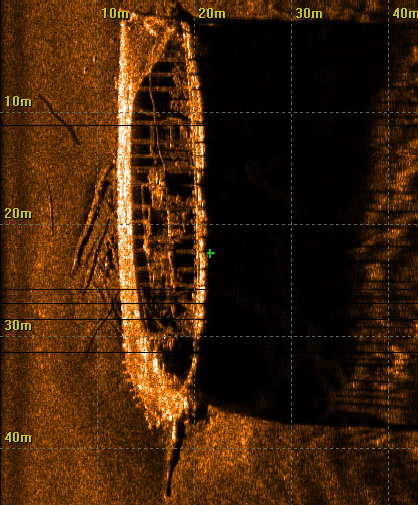
Side-scan sonar image of shipwreck Aid in Estonia.

The type of survey required depends on the information that is needed to resolve archaeological questions, but most sites will need at least some form of topographical survey and a site plan showing the locations of artifacts and other archaeological material, where samples were taken and where different types of archaeological investigation were carried out. Environmental assessment of archaeological sites will also require that environmental conditions (water chemistry, dynamic properties) as well as the natural organisms present on the site are recorded. For shipwrecks, particularly post-industrial age shipwrecks, pollution threats from wreck material may need to be investigated and recorded.

The simplest approach to survey is to carry out three-dimensional surveying by divers using depth gauges and tape measurements. Research shows that such measurements are typically less accurate than similar surveys on land. Where it is not practical or safe for divers to physically visit a site, Remotely Operated Vehicles (ROVs) enable observation and intervention with control by personnel located at the surface. The low technology approach of measuring using tape measures and depth gauges can be replaced with a more accurate and quicker high technology approach using acoustic positioning. ROV technology was used during the Mardi Gras Shipwreck Project. The "Mardi Gras Shipwreck" sank some 200 years ago about 35 miles off the coast of Louisiana in the Gulf of Mexico in 4,000 feet (1,200 meters) of water.

Remote sensing or Marine Geophysics is generally carried out using equipment towed from a vessel on the surface and therefore does not require any one, or any equipment to actually penetrate to the full depth of the site. Sensitive sonar, especially side-scan sonar or multi-beam sonar may be used to image an underwater site. Magnetometry can be used to locate metal remains such as metal shipwrecks, anchors and cannon. Sub-bottom profiling utilizes sonar to detect structures buried beneath sediment.

=== Recording ===
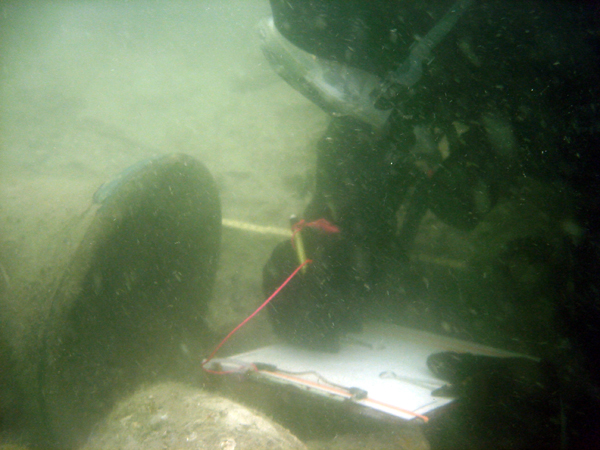
LAMP archaeologist recording a scaled drawing of the ship's bell discovered on the late 18th century "Storm Wreck" off St. Augustine, Florida

A variety of techniques are available to divers to record findings underwater. Scale drawing is the basic tool of archaeology and can be undertaken underwater. Pencils will write underwater on permatrace, plastic dive slates, or matt laminated paper.

Photography and videography are the mainstays of recording, which has become much more convenient with the advent of reasonably priced digital still and HD video cameras. Cameras, including video cameras can be provided with special underwater housings that enable them to be used for underwater videography. Low visibility underwater and distortion of image due to refraction mean that perspective photographs can be difficult to obtain. However, it is possible to take a series of photographs at adjacent points and then combined into a single photomontage or photomosaic image of the whole site. 3D photogrammetry has also become a very popular way to image underwater cultural materials and shipwreck sites.

=== Excavation ===
Where intrusive underwater excavation is appropriate, silts and sediments can be removed from an area of investigation using a water dredge or airlift. When used correctly, these devices have an additional benefit in tending to improve the visibility in the immediate vicinity of the investigation. For very deep sea excavation manned and unmanned submersibles are sometimes used to view sites. Underwater photography and sonar imaging can also be conducted from these platforms which assists the recording process.

=== Archaeological science ===
A variety of archaeological sciences are used in underwater archaeology. Dendrochronology is an important technique especially for dating the timbers of wooden ships. It may also provide additional information, including the area where the timber was harvested (i.e. likely to be where the ship was built) and whether or not there are later repairs or reuse of salvaged materials. Because plant and animal material can be preserved underwater, archaeobotany and archaeozoology have roles in underwater archaeology. For example, for submerged terrestrial sites or inland water, identification of pollen samples from sedimentary or silt layers can provide information on the plants growing on surrounding land and hence on the nature of the landscape. Information about metal artifacts can be obtained through X-ray of concretions. Geology can provide insight into how the site evolved, including changes in sea-level, erosion by rivers and deposition by rivers or in the sea.

=== Artifact recovery and conservation ===
Artifacts recovered from underwater sites need stabilization to manage the process of removal of water and conservation. The artifact either needs to be dried carefully, or the water replaced with some inert medium (as in the case of The Mary Rose). Artifacts recovered from salt water, particularly metals and glass need be stabilized following absorption of salt or leaching of metals. In-situ conservation of underwater structures is possible, but consideration needs to be given to the dynamic nature of the site. Changes to the site during intrusive investigation or removal of artifacts may result in scouring which exposes the site to further deterioration.

=== Interpretation and presentation of underwater archaeology ===
Diver trails also called wreck trails can be used to allow scuba-divers to visit and understand archaeological sites that are suitable for scuba-diving One excellent example is the Florida Public Archaeology Network's (FPAN) "Florida Panhandle Shipwreck Trail." The Florida Panhandle Shipwreck Trail features 12 shipwrecks including artificial reefs and a variety of sea life for diving, snorkeling and fishing offshore of Pensacola, Destin, Panama City and Port St. Joe, Florida. Otherwise presentation will typically rely on publication (book or journal articles, web-sites and electronic media such as CD-ROM). Television programs, web videos and social media can also bring an understanding of underwater archaeology to a broad audience. The Mardi Gras Shipwreck Project integrated a one-hour HD documentary, short videos for public viewing and video updates during the expedition as part of the educational outreach. Webcasting is also another tool for educational outreach. For one week in 2000 and 2001, live underwater video of the Queen Anne's Revenge Shipwreck Project was webcast to the Internet as a part of the QAR DiveLive educational program that reached thousands of children around the world. Created and co-produced by Nautilus Productions and Marine Grafics, this project enabled students to talk to scientists and learn about methods and technologies utilized by the underwater archaeology team.

== Environmental impact ==
Underwater archeology can have many impacts on the environment such as destroying habitats and disrupting wildlife that may be in the area of the archeological site. Acidification of the seas likewise has an impact on archaeological remains, in some cases speeding up risks to underwater heritage.

== Publications ==
Publication is an essential part of the archaeological process and is particularly crucial for underwater archaeology, where sites are generally not accessible and it is often the case that sites are not preserved in-situ.

The specialist journals on maritime archaeology, which include the long established International Journal of Nautical Archaeology, The Bulletin of the Australasian Institute for Maritime Archaeology (AIMA) and the recently launched Journal of Maritime Archaeology publish articles about maritime archaeological research and underwater archaeology. However, research on underwater sites can also be published in mainstream archaeological journals, or thematic archaeological journals. Some institutions also make their unpublished reports, often called 'Grey Literature', accessible thereby allowing access to far more detail and a wider range of archaeological data than is otherwise the case with books and journals. An example is the works of the Department of Maritime Archaeology at the Western Australian Museum.

The public interest market is covered by a number of diving, shipwreck and underwater archaeology books, beginning with the works of Jacques Cousteau.

The techniques of underwater archaeology are also documented in published works, including a number of handbooks, and Muckelroy's classic work on Maritime Archaeology.

== See also ==
- Aerial archaeology
- Atlit Yam - Submerged neolithic settlement off the coast of Israel
- Archaeology of shipwrecks – Study of human activity through the analysis of shipwreck artifacts
- Lake fortress
- Lighthouse Archaeological Maritime Program (LAMP) – Museum in St Augustine Florida
- Maritime archaeology – Archaeological study of human interaction with the sea
- Nautical Archaeology Society – British nautical archaeology organisation
- Pantelleria Vecchia Bank Megalith – Anomalous underwater artifact of uncertain origin
- Remotely operated underwater vehicle – Tethered underwater mobile device operated by a remote crew
- Sea of Galilee#Archaeology - Conical stone structure under the Sea of Galilee
- Sea Research Society – American nonprofit for marine research (Shipwrecks & Underwater Archaeology)
- Archaeology Discover Centre, also known as Underwater Archaeology Centre and Sunken Secrets – Museum in Fort Victoria, Isle of Wight, England
- Underwater acoustics – Study of the propagation of sound in water
- Underwater search and recovery – Locating and recovering underwater objects
- Unidentified submerged object – Unusual phenomenon in water that is not readily identifiable
- Wreck diving – Recreational diving on wrecks
- Blue Heritage Project - Turkish initiative focusing on archaeological discoveries within its coastal waters.
