= Richard Halsey =

American film editor

- Born: 1940 (age 85–86)
- Years active: 1974–present
- Spouse: Colleen Halsey

Richard Halsey (born 1940) is an American film editor with more than 60 credits from 1970 onwards. An alumnus of Hollywood High School, he won an Academy Award for Best Film Editing at the 49th Academy Awards for editing Rocky with Scott Conrad, also being nominated for one BAFTA and one Emmy Award. He often works with his wife Colleen Halsey and they are credited together. Both have been elected to membership in American Cinema Editors (A.C.E.); Halsey has been a member since 1988. He is now living in the Hollywood Hills.

== Selected filmography ==
Editor
Year	Film	Director	Notes
1970	Up in the Cellar	Theodore J. Flicker	
1972	No Drums, No Bugles	Clyde Ware	First collaboration with Clyde Ware
1972	Payday	Daryl Duke	
1973	Pat Garrett and Billy the Kid	Sam Peckinpah	
1973	When the Line Goes Through	Clyde Ware	Second collaboration with Clyde Ware
1974	Harry and Tonto	Paul Mazursky	First collaboration with Paul Mazursky
1975	W.W. and the Dixie Dancekings	John G. Avildsen	First collaboration with John G. Avildsen
1976	Next Stop, Greenwich Village	Paul Mazursky	Second collaboration with Paul Mazursky
1976	Rocky	John G. Avildsen	Second collaboration with John G. Avildsen
1977	Fire Sale	Alan Arkin	
1978	Thank God It's Friday	Robert Klane	
1979	Boulevard Nights	Michael Pressman	
1980	American Gigolo	Paul Schrader	
1980	Tribute	Bob Clark	
1982	Losin' It	Curtis Hanson	
1982	That Championship Season	Jason Miller	
1984	Moscow on the Hudson	Paul Mazursky	Third collaboration with Paul Mazursky
1984	Dreamscape	Joseph Ruben	
1984	Body Rock	Marcelo Epstein	
1986	Down and Out in Beverly Hills	Paul Mazursky	Fourth collaboration with Paul Mazursky
1987	Mannequin	Michael Gottlieb	
1987	Dragnet	Tom Mankiewicz	
1988	Earth Girls Are Easy	Julien Temple	
1988	Beaches	Garry Marshall	
1990	Joe Versus the Volcano	John Patrick Shanley	
1990	Edward Scissorhands	Tim Burton	
1992	Article 99	Howard Deutch	First collaboration with Howard Deutch
1992	Sister Act	Emile Ardolino	
1993	So I Married an Axe Murderer	Thomas Schlamme	
1994	Getting Even with Dad	Howard Deutch	Second collaboration with Howard Deutch
1995	The Net	Irwin Winkler	
1995	Last of the Dogmen	Tab Murphy	
1996	Eddie	Steve Rash	
1997	That Old Feeling	Carl Reiner	
1998	Barney's Great Adventure	Steve Gomer	First collaboration with Steve Gomer
1999	Presence of Mind	Antoni Aloy	
2001	Kingdom Come	Doug McHenry	
2001	Dumb Luck	Craig Clyde	
2002	Pumpkin	Anthony Abrams; Adam Larson Broder	
2002	Sorority Boys	Wallace Wolodarsky	
2004	Eulogy	Michael Clancy	
2005	When Do We Eat?	Salvador Litvak	
2006	Yellow	Alfredo De Villa	
2007	Big Stan	Rob Schneider	First collaboration with Rob Schneider
2008	Spy School	Mark Blutman	
2008	Stiletto	Nick Vallelonga	
2010	Dreamkiller	Catherine Pirotta	
2011	The Chicago 8	Pinchas Perry	
2011	Valley of the Sun	Stokes McIntyre	
2012	Ticket Out	Doug Lodato	
2012	The Girl from the Naked Eye	David Ren	
2012	186 Dollars to Freedom	Camilo Vila	
2012	Christmas in Compton	David Raynr	
2013	Victims	Chris Abell; Jeffrey B. Mallian	
2013	Max Rose	Daniel Noah	
2013	Snake & Mongoose	Wayne Holloway	
2014	The Ganzfeld Haunting	Michael Oblowitz	
2014	Road to the Open	Cole Claassen	
2014	Helicopter Mom	Salomé Breziner	
2016	Spaceman	Brett Rapkin	
2016	Loserville	Lovell Holder	
2016	Her Secret Sessions	Meir Sharony	
2017	All Saints	Steve Gomer	Second collaboration with Steve Gomer
2017	Limelight	James Cullen Bressack	
2018	The Little Mermaid	Blake Harris; Chris Bouchard	First collaboration with Blake Harris
2019	Working Man	Robert Jury	
2019	Purge of Kingdoms	Ara Paiaya	
2019	The Outsider	Timothy Woodward Jr.	
2019	Married Young	Daniel Kaufman	
2020	Anastasia: Once Upon a Time	Blake Harris	Second collaboration with Blake Harris
2020	Baby Doll	White Cross	
2020	Divos!	Ryan Patrick Bartley	
2020	The App That Stole Christmas	Monica Floyd	
2023	Bezos	Khoa Le	

Editorial department
Year	Film	Director	Role
1981	The Amateur	Charles Jarrott	Supervising editor
1985	Heated Vengeance	Edward D. Murphy	Supervising editor
1986	Jocks	Steve Carver	Supervising editor
1999	Toy Story 2	John Lasseter	Additional editor
2004	The Sure Hand of God	Michael Kolko	Supervising editor
2009	Don't Look Up	Fruit Chan	Editorial consultant
2013	What About Love	Klaus Menzel	Supervising editor
2021	86 Melrose Avenue	Lili Matta	Post-production consultant

Additional crew
Year	Film	Director	Role
1998	Barney's Great Adventure	Steve Gomer	Second unit consultant
2016	Spaceman	Brett Rapkin	Additional voices

Second unit director or assistant director
Year	Film	Director	Role
1981	The Amateur	Charles Jarrott	Second unit director

Thanks
Year	Film	Director	Role
1992	3 Ninjas	Jon Turteltaub	Special thanks
1995	Pie in the Sky	Bryan Gordon	Thanks
2021	Far More	Ally Walker	Special thanks
2024	Plan B	Brandon Tamburri	Special thanks

Direct-to-video films

Editor
Year	Film	Director	Notes
2009	Bring It On: Fight to the Finish	Bille Woodruff	
2010	The Chosen One	Rob Schneider	Second collaboration with Rob Schneider
2014	1000 to 1: The Cory Weissman Story	Mike Levine	

TV movies

Editor
Year	Film	Director
1972	Moon of the Wolf	Daniel Petrie
1973	Honor Thy Father	Paul Wendkos
1973	Terror on the Beach	Paul Wendkos
1973	I Heard the Owl Call My Name	Daryl Duke
1976	Louis Armstrong - Chicago Style	Lee Philips
1999	Pirates of Silicon Valley	Martyn Burke
1999	The Wishing Tree	Ivan Passer
2000	Picnic	Ivan Passer
2001	Warden of Red Rock	Stephen Gyllenhaal
2003	Coast to Coast	Paul Mazursky
2014	Love by Design	Michael Damian
2017	Enchanted Christmas	Terry Cunningham
2022	Vanished: Searching for My Sister	Timothy Woodward Jr.

Editorial department
Year	Film	Director	Role
1973	Firehouse	Alex March	Associate editor

TV series

Editor
Year	Title	Notes
1968−69	Peyton Place	15 episodes
2017	Fielders Choice	1 episode
2023	Kombucha Cure	6 episodes

== Awards and nominations ==
- 2005:
  - Nominated: ACE Best Edited Miniseries or Motion Picture for Non-Commercial Television - Coast to Coast
- 2000:
  - Won: ACE Best Edited Motion Picture Movie for Commercial Television - Pirates of Silicon Valley
- 1999:
  - Nominated: Emmy Award for Outstanding Single Camera Picture Editing for a Miniseries or a Movie - Pirates of Silicon Valley
- 1978:
  - Nominated: BAFTA Award for Best Editing - Rocky
- 1977:
  - Won: Academy Award for Best Film Editing - Rocky (shared with Scott Conrad)
  - Won: ACE Best Edited Feature Film - Rocky (shared with Scott Conrad)
