= David Bretherton =

American film editor (1924–2000)

- Born: David L. Bretherton; February 29, 1924; Los Angeles, California, U.S.
- Died: May 11, 2000 (aged 76); Los Angeles, California, U.S.
- Father: Howard Bretherton
- Awards: ACE Eddie 1972 Cabaret; ACE Career Achievement 1995

David L. Bretherton (February 29, 1924 – May 11, 2000) was an American film editor with more than 40 credits for films released from 1954 to 1996.

== Biography ==
Bretherton, the son of editor/director Howard Bretherton and actress Dorothea McEvoy, was born in Los Angeles. He served with the United States Air Force during World War II. After World War II, he joined the editing department at Twentieth Century-Fox, at first helping other editors, including Barbara McLean, Robert L. Simpson, Louis R. Loeffler, James B. Clark, William H. Reynolds, and, in later years, Dorothy Spencer and Hugh S. Fowler. His first project as a film editor was The Bottom of the Bottle in 1956. In 1995, Bretherton received the American Cinema Editors Career Achievement Award. Bretherton died of pneumonia in Los Angeles in 2000.

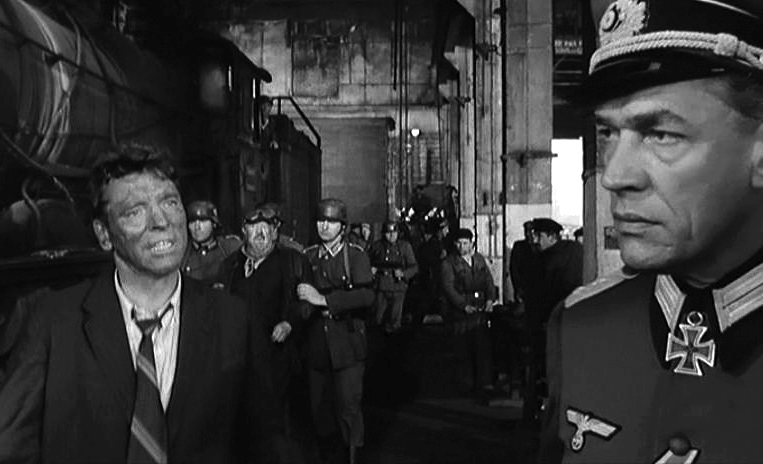
L. to R. : Paul Scofield, Michel Simon (background) & Burt Lancaster in The Train.

Bretherton's most noted work was the editing of the film Cabaret (1972), which was directed by Bob Fosse. Bretherton received the Academy Award for Best Film Editing, an ACE Eddie Award, and a nomination for the BAFTA Award for Best Editing for this film. In his 1972 review, Roger Greenspun gives some insight into Bretherton's achievement:

... the film has a musical part and a nonmusical part (except for Miss Minnelli, none of the major characters sings), and if you add this to the juxtaposition of private lives and public history inherent in the scheme of the Berlin Stories, you come up with a structure of extraordinary mechanical complexity. Since everything has to do with everything else and the Cabaret is always commenting on the life outside it, the film sometimes looks like an essay in significant crosscutting, or associative montage. Occasionally this fails; more often it works.

Cabaret was listed as the 30th best-edited film of all time in a 2012 survey of members of the Motion Picture Editors Guild.

== Filmography ==
Editor
Year	Film	Director	Notes
1956	The Bottom of the Bottle	Henry Hathaway	
1956	Hilda Crane	Philip Dunne	First collaboration with Philip Dunne
1956	The King and Four Queens	Raoul Walsh	
1956	Three Brave Men	Philip Dunne	Second collaboration with Philip Dunne
1957	Bernardine	Henry Levin	
1957	Valerie	Gerd Oswald	
1957	Peyton Place	Mark Robson	
1958	Ten North Frederick	Philip Dunne	Third collaboration with Philip Dunne
1959	The Diary of Anne Frank	George Stevens	
1960	Let's Make Love	George Cukor	
1961	Return to Peyton Place	José Ferrer	First collaboration with José Ferrer
1962	State Fair	José Ferrer	Second collaboration with José Ferrer
1964	The Train	John Frankenheimer	
1965	The Sandpiper	Vincente Minnelli	First collaboration with Vincente Minnelli
1967	The Honey Pot	Joseph L. Mankiewicz	
1968	Villa Rides	Buzz Kulik	
1970	On a Clear Day You Can See Forever	Vincente Minnelli	Second collaboration with Vincente Minnelli
1970	Lovers and Other Strangers	Cy Howard	
1971	Fools' Parade	Andrew V. McLaglen	
1971	Los Marcados	Alberto Mariscal	
1972	Cabaret	Bob Fosse	
1972	No Drums, No Bugles	Clyde Ware	
1973	Save the Tiger	John G. Avildsen	First collaboration with John G. Avildsen
1973	Slither	Howard Zieff	
1973	Westworld	Michael Crichton	First collaboration with Michael Crichton
1974	Bank Shot	Gower Champion	
1975	The Man in the Glass Booth	Arthur Hiller	First collaboration with Arthur Hiller
1976	Harry and Walter Go to New York	Mark Rydell	
1976	High Velocity	Remi Kramer	
1976	Silver Streak	Arthur Hiller	Second collaboration with Arthur Hiller
1978	Coma	Michael Crichton	Second collaboration with Michael Crichton
1978	The First Great Train Robbery	Michael Crichton	Third collaboration with Michael Crichton
1979	Winter Kills	William Richert	
1980	It's My Turn	Claudia Weill	Uncredited
1982	Cannery Row	David S. Ward	
1982	The Best Little Whorehouse in Texas	Colin Higgins	
1983	Man, Woman and Child	Dick Richards	
1984	Lovelines	Rod Amateau	
1985	Baby: Secret of the Lost Legend	Bill L. Norton	
1985	Clue	Jonathan Lynn	
1987	Lionheart	Franklin J. Schaffner	
1987	The Pick-up Artist	James Toback	
1989	Sea of Love	Harold Becker	First collaboration with Harold Becker
1993	Malice	Harold Becker	Second collaboration with Harold Becker
1996	City Hall	Harold Becker	Third collaboration with Harold Becker

Editorial department
Year	Film	Director	Role	Notes
1974	The Super Cops	Gordon Parks	Consulting editor	
1980	The Big Red One	Samuel Fuller	Supervising editor	
1980	Caddyshack	Harold Ramis	Supervising editor	
1980	The Formula	John G. Avildsen	Supervising editor	Second collaboration with John G. Avildsen

Actor
Year	Film	Director	Role	Notes
1970	On a Clear Day You Can See Forever	Vincente Minnelli	A Barber	Uncredited

Additional crew
Year	Film	Director	Role
1970	Emiliano Zapata	Felipe Cazals	Technical supervisor

Documentaries

Editor
Year	Film	Director
1976	That's Entertainment, Part II	Gene Kelly

Shorts

Editor
Year	Film	Director
1955	The Living Swamp	David DaLie
1956	The Dark Wave	Jean Negulesco

TV series

Editor
Year	Title	Notes
1959−60	Five Fingers	2 episodes
1961	Follow the Sun	2 episodes
1962−63	Empire	2 episodes

Additional crew
Year	Title	Role	Notes
1963	Empire	Assistant to the producer	3 episodes

TV specials

Editor
Year	Title	Director
1968	The Bing Crosby Special	Marc Breaux
