= Al Jenkins (EastEnders) =

Fictional character from the BBC soap opera EastEnders

- EastEnders character
- Portrayed by: Adam Croasdell
- Duration: 2009–2010
- First appearance: Episode 3781; 1 May 2009
- Last appearance: Episode 3943; 4 February 2010
- Introduced by: Diederick Santer
In-universe information
- Occupation: General practitioner

Dr Al Jenkins is a fictional character from the BBC soap opera EastEnders, played by Adam Croasdell. He first appeared on 1 May 2009. It was announced on 26 November 2009 that the character would leave the soap in early 2010. His final appearance was on 4 February 2010.

== Creation and development ==
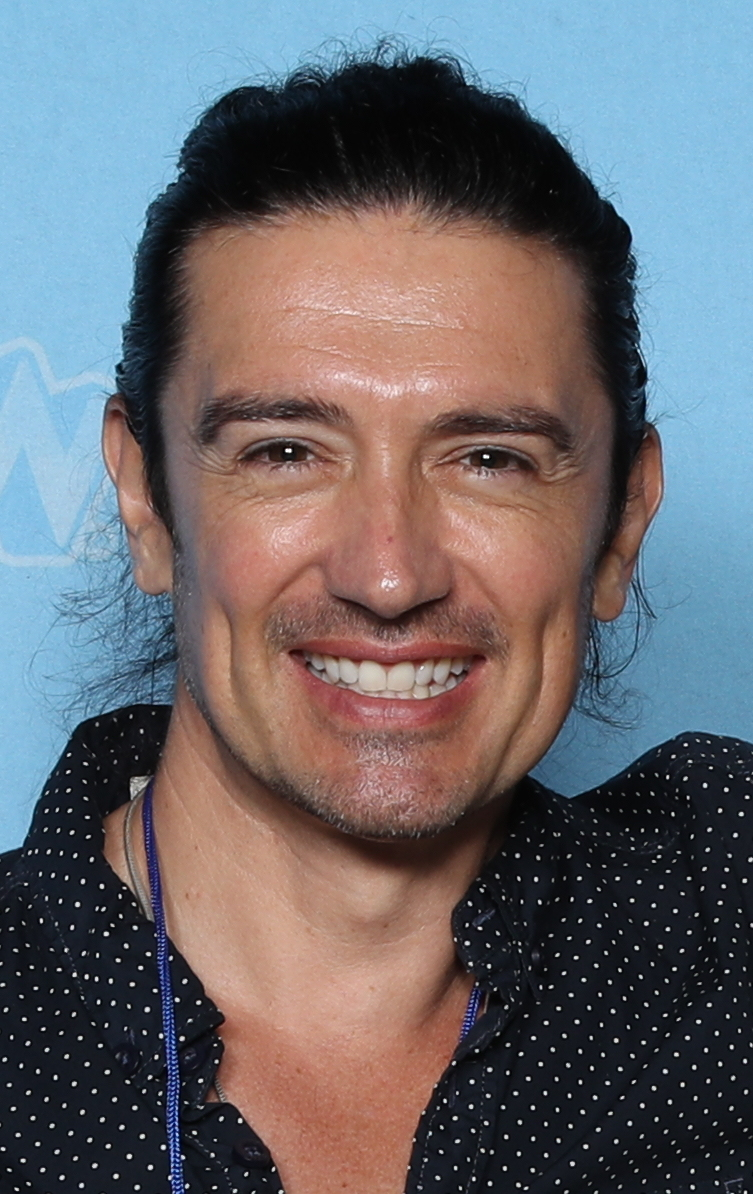
Adam Croasdell (pictured) portrayed Al.

Introduced in May 2009 by executive producer Diederick Santer, Al Jenkins follows on from Doctors Harold Legg (Leonard Fenton), Fred Fonseca (Jimi Mistry), Jonathan Leroy (Ivan Kaye), Anthony Trueman (Nicholas Bailey), Oliver Cousins (Tom Ellis) and May Wright (Amanda Drew) as the soap's resident General Practitioner.

Actor Adam Croasdell was cast in the role, commenting, "It is my first soap and I'm really pleased to be in it — it's such a British institution. It's a real honour to be a part of it and it's a whole other skillset to what I've done before. I'm used to getting several takes if I need it, and this is like two takes and you move on. You have to be so on the ball when they call "Action" [...] I am so impressed with the writing, the dramatic tension and the array of brilliant characters. I'm a huge fan now and I'm not just saying that." He added: "With the leaving of Robert Kazinsky (Sean Slater), I'm feeling the pressure if I've been hired to step into his shoes! You hope that your storylines are going to be a little bit more than for flesh-fodder, but it's all good."

Al is described as "a big kid [and a] free spirit". Croasdell said of his character: "He's outdoorsy, a good doctor and generally nice — but not too nice. He's also domestically useless. He's not a butter-wouldn't-melt sort of a man. He can also be selfish." He also stated that "[Al]'s certainly got his flaws and is quite edgy at times. He's not all sweetness and light." Croasdell went on to say that "he's a bit of a surfer [and] I think he slightly resents being back for those reasons because he's quite outdoorsy, but his mum comes first. He's come to set up and make a life for himself back at his origins. [He's] single and he likes to mingle!

On 26 November 2009 it was announced that Croasdell would leave the show in 2010 in order to embark on a charity visit to Malawi. He stated: "I have worked with and befriended a lot of fantastic actors while I have been at EastEnders. I am very grateful for my time on the show and all the support shown to me to me by the wonderful viewers who have followed my storylines and been so supportive. I see it as a chapter in my ongoing work as an actor – as I am always interested in new challenges, so I am looking forward to future projects."

== Storylines ==
=== Backstory ===
Al grew up in Walford and knew Dot Cotton (June Brown) when he was a boy. Prior to moving back to Walford he lived in Ilfracombe, Devon but came to Walford to visit his mother, who has arthritis, and to take over the doctor's surgery from Dr. Poppy Merritt (Amy Darcy).

=== 2009–2010 ===
Al arrives on 1 May 2009, and meets Heather Trott (Cheryl Fergison), who tells him her problems, despite him being off-duty. He is the first person to learn that she is pregnant, and they become friends, with Al reassuring Heather about her new status as a mother. Several female locals comment on his looks, and Tanya Branning (Jo Joyner) accidentally spills coffee on him, prompting him to ask her out. After several drinks on different occasions in The Queen Victoria public house, Al invites Tanya to lunch at Fargo's restaurant. Tanya's ex-husband Max Branning (Jake Wood) overhears this and asks his son, Bradley Branning (Charlie Clements), to go to the restaurant and spy on them. After an awkward date, Al ends their brief relationship and starts dating Roxy Mitchell (Rita Simons), and soon realises he has feelings for her.

In October 2009, Jean Slater (Gillian Wright) approaches Al and asks him to section her mentally unstable daughter, Stacey (Lacey Turner). When Stacey comes home, Al is waiting with two colleagues and two police officers. Al formally declares Stacey's sectioning to her, and she is taken away by the police. He DJ's the dance contest for Children in Need and Chelsea Fox (Tiana Benjamin) invites him as her date to her parents Denise (Diane Parish) and Lucas' (Don Gilet) wedding. Al reluctantly accepts her invitation, even though he planned to ask Roxy. After Roxy catches Chelsea flirting with him, Al starts a relationship with Roxy.

In February 2010, Al asks Roxy to move with him to Cornwall, revealing that someone has complained about their relationship even though she was not his patient, so he resigned. She does not want to leave Walford so he ends their relationship and leaves alone, after saying goodbye to Heather, his favourite patient.

== Reception ==
The character's affiliation with North Devon and surfing has been praised by Devonshire residents, with one saying, "This is really great for Ilfracombe, to have such a high profile mention in EastEnders. Ilfracombe has a huge water sports culture and the town is definitely on the up, with people like Damien Hirst raising the profile." Another resident was dubious about the character taking his surf board to Walford: "There's a tube up there, but I don't think he'll be able to surf it."
