= Scott Conrad =

American film editor

- Born: 1944 (age 80–81)
- Occupation: Film editor

Scott Conrad (born 1944) is an American film editor. He won an Academy Award in the category Best Film Editing for the film Rocky.

== Selected filmography ==
- A Boy and His Dog (1975)
- Rocky (1976; co-won with Richard Halsey)
- The Hollywood Knights (1980)
- Cheech and Chong's Next Movie (1980)
- Spacehunter: Adventures in the Forbidden Zone (1983)
- Cat's Eye (1985)
- The Wraith (1986)
- The Bedroom Window (1987)
- Class of 1999 (1990)
- Vampires: The Turning (2005)
- Anaconda 3: Offspring (2008)
- Crazy on the Outside (2010)
