= Lon Tinkle =

American journalist

- Born: March 20, 1906; Dallas, Texas
- Died: January 11, 1980 (aged 73); Dallas, Texas

Academic background
- Education: Southern Methodist University (BA, MA); University of Paris

Academic work
- Discipline: Literature, French, Texas history
- Institutions: Southern Methodist University

Julien Lon Tinkle (March 20, 1906 – January 11, 1980) was a historian, writer, and book critic, who specialized in French literature and the history of Texas. Tinkle, professor at Southern Methodist University and long-time book editor and critic for the Dallas Morning News, was known for his award-winning books, including a widely-read history of the battle of the Alamo and a biography of J. Frank Dobie. He was president of the Texas Institute of Letters from 1949 to 1952 and is today the namesake of its highest honor, the Lon Tinkle Award for Lifetime Achievement.

== Early life and education ==
Tinkle was born in Dallas, Texas on March 20, 1906, to James Ward Tinkle and Mary (née Gardenhire) Tinkle. His grandfather had been a rancher and farmer in Rockwall, Texas, a community co-founded by his great-grandfather. His French grandmother, who spoke the language and made wine, gave him what he later described as an instinctive love of France.

Tinkle attended Southern Methodist University in Dallas, where he earned a Bachelor of Arts degree in 1927 and a Master of Arts degree in 1932. Tinkle then moved to Paris, where he studied at the University of Paris, earning a diplôme de phonétique in 1933. He subsequently undertook post-graduate work at Columbia University.

== Career ==
After completing his post-graduate work, Tinkle accepted a position as an instructor at his alma mater, Southern Methodist University. He eventually became the school's E. A. Lilly Professor of Literature. In 1942 he began working as a book editor and critic for the Dallas Morning News. According to Evelyn Oppenheimer in her book A Book Lover in Texas, after Tinkle became the book editor, "book reviewing in The Dallas Morning News rose to a level of notable quality and was nationally recognized". From 1949 until 1952, Tinkle served as president of the Texas Institute of Letters.

== Writing ==
Tinkle's first book, Thirteen Days to Glory: The Siege of the Alamo, was published in 1958. It was only the second full-length, non-fiction book to be published about the Battle of the Alamo, following John Myers Myers' 1948 book, The Alamo. A.C. Greene, a book critic at a competing Dallas newspaper, listed Thirteen Days to Glory in his book The 50+ Best Books on Texas in 1998. According to Greene, Tinkle's book "gives the essence of the Alamo story without attempting to exhaust history's explanation", and "is more revealing of the minds and wills that were behind the fateful decision to stay on to death" than other, later treatments of the battle. The book won two awards in 1959, from the Texas Institute of Letters and the Sons of the Republic of Texas. In the 1980s, it was adapted into a made-for-television movie, The Alamo: Thirteen Days to Glory, which historian Albert Nofi regards as the most historically accurate of all Alamo films. In 1985, the book was reprinted by Texas A&M University Press.

After Thirteen Days to Glory was published, Tinkle was hired as a historical advisor for John Wayne's film about the battle, The Alamo, which was released in 1960. Although screenwriter James Edward Grant claimed to have done extensive historical research, according to historian Timothy Todish "there is not a single scene in The Alamo which corresponds to an historically verifiable incident", and Tinkle and fellow historical advisor J. Frank Dobie demanded that their names be removed from the credits. Tinkle was also paid $800 for allowing the title of his book to be used in the theme song for this movie.

== Legacy ==
Tinkle was named to the Ordre des Palmes Académiques in France, an honor he attributed to his lifelong engagement with French language and culture. He received an honorary Doctor of Laws from St. Mary's University in San Antonio, Texas in 1963. The institute has since named its lifetime achievement award for Tinkle. He was also a member of the Philosophical Society of Texas and the Dallas Chamber of Commerce Fine Arts Committee. A large portion of Tinkle's private book collection was donated to the Eugene McDermott Library at the University of Texas at Dallas.

== Personal life ==
Tinkle married Maria Ofelia Garza on December 27, 1939. They had three sons. The Tinkle family lived near Southern Methodist University in a pocket of University Park inhabited by many academics and artists. "Culture Gulch," as this area near Turtle Creek is called, was also home to John Chapman, head of University of Texas Southwestern Medical School, and the artists Jerry Bywaters and Ed Bearden. The Tinkle home, designed by the architect O'Neil Ford, was controversially demolished in 2013.

Tinkle described his three greatest enthusiasms as tennis, Paris, and his wife Maria. He identified as a lifelong Democrat and a Christian.

== Bibliography ==
=== As author ===
- Thirteen Days to Glory: The Siege of the Alamo (1958)
- The Story of Oklahoma (1962)
- The Valiant Few; Crisis at the Alamo (1964)
- Miracle in Mexico: The Story of Juan Diego (1965)
- The Key to Dallas (1965)
- J. Frank Dobie: The Makings of an Ample Mind (1968)
- Mr. De: A Biography of Everette Lee DeGolyer (1970)
- An American Original: The Life of J. Frank Dobie (1978)

=== As editor ===
- The Cowboy Reader (1969), with Allen Maxwell
- Treson Nobel: An Anthology of French Nobel Prize-Winners (1963), with Wynn Rickey
