= The Girl from the Naked Eye =

- Theatrical film poster
- Directed by: David Ren
- Written by: Larry Madill; David Ren; Jason Yee
- Produced by: Henry Mu; Jason Yee; Ron Yuan
- Starring: Jason Yee; Dominique Swain; Sasha Grey; Ron Yuan
- Cinematography: Max Da-Yung Wang
- Edited by: Greg Babor; Richard Halsey
- Music by: Danny Manor
- Release date: June 15, 2012
- Running time: 84 mins
- Country: United States
- Language: English
- Budget: $1,100,000 (estimated)

The Girl from the Naked Eye is a 2012 American neo-noir martial arts film directed and written by David Ren. It stars Jason Yee, Samantha Streets, Ron Yuan, Dominique Swain, Sasha Grey and others. It was released on June 15, 2012.

== Plot ==
Jake (Jason Yee) is a hired driver for a seedy escort service operating out of "The Naked Eye" Strip Club, and falls for a witty high-class escort named Sandy (Samantha Streets). However, one night Sandy is found dead, with the only clues remaining being records of cell phone calls made the night she was murdered. Jake sets out to avenge Sandy's death by risking everything and walking a bloody path to find her killer.

== Cast ==
- Jason Yee as Jake
- Samantha Streets as Sandy
- Ron Yuan as Simon
- Dominique Swain as Alissa
- Gary Stretch as Frank
- Jerry C. Ying as Johnny
- Sasha Grey as Lena
- Wilson Jermaine Heredia as Bobby

== Production ==
The movie was released under Lifted Productions.

== Reception ==
As of June 2020, The Girl from the Naked Eye holds a 40% approval rating on review aggregator Rotten Tomatoes, based on 15 reviews with an average rating of 5.45/10. On Metacritic, the film has a weighted average score of 40 out of 100, based on 7 critics, indicating "mixed or average reviews".

Mark Holcomb of The Village Voice gave the film a negative review, writing, "Ren is at least savvy enough to make Naked Eye's pulp inspirations plain... But there are dozens of better, riskier, more interesting films that go unreleased every year—why this militantly dull effort is taking their place is its only worthwhile mystery." Alison Willmore of The A.V. Club stated that the film's cultural twist was interesting, but ultimately called the film a derivative of Miller's Sin City. Roger Ebert gave the film 2 stars out of 4.

=== Awards ===
Award	Category	Subject	Result
Canada International Film Festival	Royal Reel Award — Feature Film Competition	Henry Mu	Won
Canada International Film Festival	Royal Reel Award — Feature Film Competition	Jason Yee	Won
Canada International Film Festival	Royal Reel Award — Feature Film Competition	Ron Yuan	Won
Hoboken International Film Festival	Best Feature Film	Henry Mu	Nominated
Hoboken International Film Festival	Best Feature Film	Jason Yee	Nominated
Hoboken International Film Festival	Best Feature Film	Ron Yuan	Nominated
Hoboken International Film Festival	Best Director	David Ren	Nominated
Hoboken International Film Festival	Best Actor	Jason Yee	Nominated
Hoboken International Film Festival	Best Supporting Actor	Ron Yuan	Nominated
Hoboken International Film Festival	Best Supporting Actress	Samantha Streets	Nominated
Hoboken International Film Festival	Best Cinematography	Max Da-Yung Wang	Won
