= Saving Lincoln =

- Theatrical release poster
- Directed by: Salvador Litvak
- Written by: Salvador Litvak; Nina Davidovich Litvak
- Produced by: Reuben Lim; Salvador Litvak
- Starring: Tom Amandes; Lea Coco; Saidah Arrika Ekulona; Creed Bratton; Josh Stamberg; Bruce Davison; Penelope Ann Miller
- Cinematography: Alexandre Naufel
- Edited by: Josh Noyes
- Music by: Mark Adler
- Production companies: Pictures From the Fringe; Lane Street Pictures
- Release date: February 13, 2013
- Running time: 101 minutes
- Country: United States
- Language: English

Saving Lincoln is a 2013 American historical drama film about Ward Hill Lamon, a friend of President Abraham Lincoln, and follows their overlapping legal careers in Illinois prior to the American Civil War. Lamon accompanied Lincoln to Washington and served as the President's main bodyguard during the war, thwarting several assassination attempts while holding the post of US Marshal. Lincoln sent Lamon to Richmond, Virginia, on Reconstruction business a few days before April 14, 1865, the day that John Wilkes Booth assassinated the President.

The film was shot on a green screen stage, using the CineCollage technique invented by the director Salvador Litvak to create interior and exterior locations. Actors, extras, furniture, and props were filmed and combined with period photographs via the CineCollage process, which relied on off-the-shelf visual effects tools. The end result was a stylized look that reflects the movie's narrative structure, which involves Lamon's personal recollections of his friend. This was the first time such a technique was used to create an entire feature film. The film released on February 13, 2013.

== Plot ==
Director Salvador Litvak and his writing partner, Nina Davidovich Litvak, based their screenplay on their extensive research into Lincoln's friendship with Lamon. Saving Lincoln charts their relationship from their initial meeting to Lincoln's Presidency. Lamon was a tall, boisterous Southerner who liked to drink whiskey, tell jokes and stories, play the banjo, and wrestle. Despite some pronounced differences between the two men, they shared a fondness for telling jokes and stories, and both felt slavery should be eliminated. Lamon often served as Lincoln's private confidant.

The film jumps from their initial meeting to Lincoln's presidency and the repeated attempts that were made on his life. Many well-known incidents are recounted, including the plot to kill Lincoln in Maryland, while he was traveling to Washington, D.C. after his first election – Lamon worked with Allan Pinkerton, who founded the famous Pinkerton Detective Agency, to thwart that plan. Other events include the time a bullet went through Lincoln's hat while he was riding his horse late one evening – he blamed it on a hunter firing an errant shot, but Lamon saw it as a sign that Lincoln was in mortal danger and needed even tighter security. Lamon was said to sometimes sleep by Lincoln's bedroom door, a striking image that appears in the film.

Themes in the story involve Lincoln's anguish over Civil War casualties, his conflicts with members of his cabinet, and the death of the Lincolns' son Willie, which drove Mary Todd Lincoln to the depths of despair. Such situations complicate Lamon's efforts to keep Lincoln safe.

== Cast ==
- Tom Amandes as President Abraham Lincoln
- Lea Coco as Ward Hill Lamon
- Penelope Ann Miller as Mary Todd Lincoln
- Joshua Rush as Tad Lincoln
- Bruce Davison as Secretary of State William H. Seward
- Creed Bratton as Senator Charles Sumner
- Josh Stamberg as Secretary of the Treasury Salmon P. Chase
- Robert Craighead as Secretary of War Edwin Stanton
- Michael Maize as Lincoln's former law partner William Herndon
- Saidah Arrika Ekulona as Mrs. Elizabeth Keckley
- Lew Temple as Montgomery Blair
- Steven Brand as Ned Baker
- Adam Croasdell as Col. Elmer Ellsworth
- Elijah Nelson as Willie Lincoln
- Michael Shamus Wiles as Cranston Laurie
- Matthew Del Negro as Nathaniel Rulough
- Peter O'Meara as General Ulysses S. Grant
- Marcus Freed as Allan Pinkerton
- David Dastmalchian as Major Eckert

Jonathan Roumie also makes an appearance as John Wilkes Booth.

== Reception ==
On review aggregator Rotten Tomatoes, the film holds an approval rating of 27% based on 15 reviews, with an average rating of 4.64/10. On Metacritic, the film has a weighted average score of 21 out of 100, based on 9 critics, indicating "generally unfavorable reviews".
