= Adam Croasdell =

British actor (born 1980)

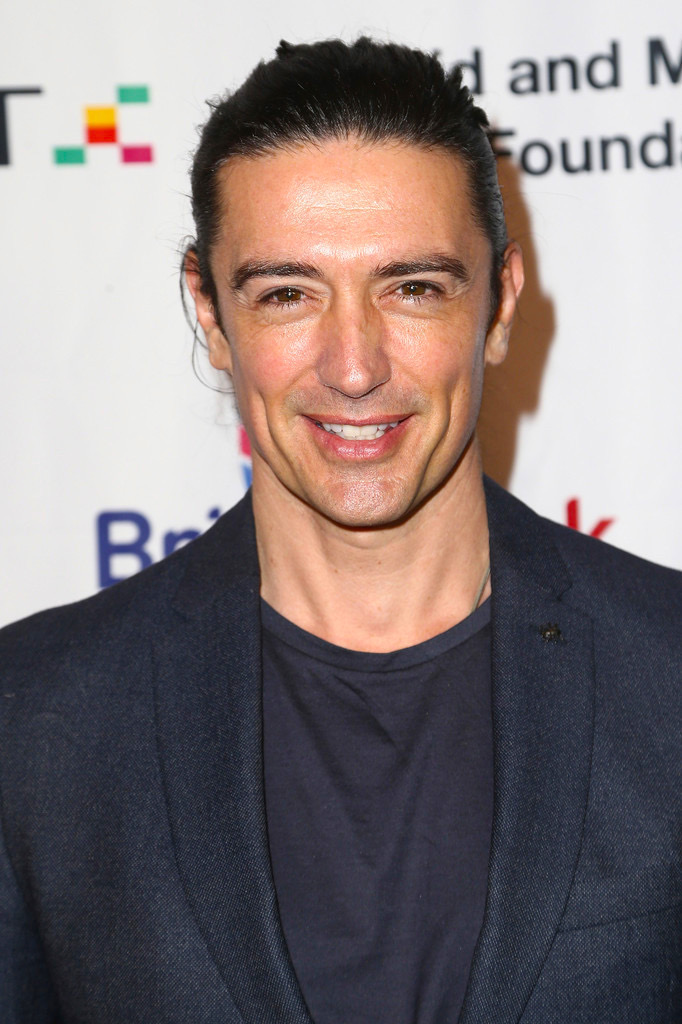
- Croasdell in 2018
- Born: July 10, 1980 (age 46); Zimbabwe
- Occupation: Actor
- Years active: 1998–present

Adam Croasdell (born July 10, 1980) is a Zimbabwean-British actor. He played the role of Dr. Al Jenkins on the BBC soap opera EastEnders and has appeared on shows such as Blood of Zeus, Castlevania, Monarch, NCIS and Preacher. He has also voiced characters such as Torvin in Middle-earth: Shadow of Mordor, Ignis Scientia in Final Fantasy XV and Alfred Pennyworth and Nightwing in Batman Ninja.

== Early life ==
Croasdell was born in Zimbabwe.

== Career ==
In 2009, Croasdell confirmed that he would be the body double for Daniel Craig in a 2010 released video game, in which he plays the role of James Bond.

Croasdell guest starred in the American show Supernatural, portraying the Norse god Baldur in the 19th episode of Season 5, "Hammer of the Gods". He also starred in Body of Proof series 2 episode 9 – "Gross Anatomy" as Ronan Gallagher which aired in the US on 29 November 2011 and in the UK on 1 March 2012.

He played Colonel Elmer Ellsworth, the first conspicuous casualty of the Civil War, in the 2012 film Saving Lincoln.

In 2015, he portrayed Brennan Jones, the father of Captain Hook, on the ABC fantasy drama Once Upon a Time.

In 2016, Croasdell voiced the character Ignis Scientia in the video game Final Fantasy XV.

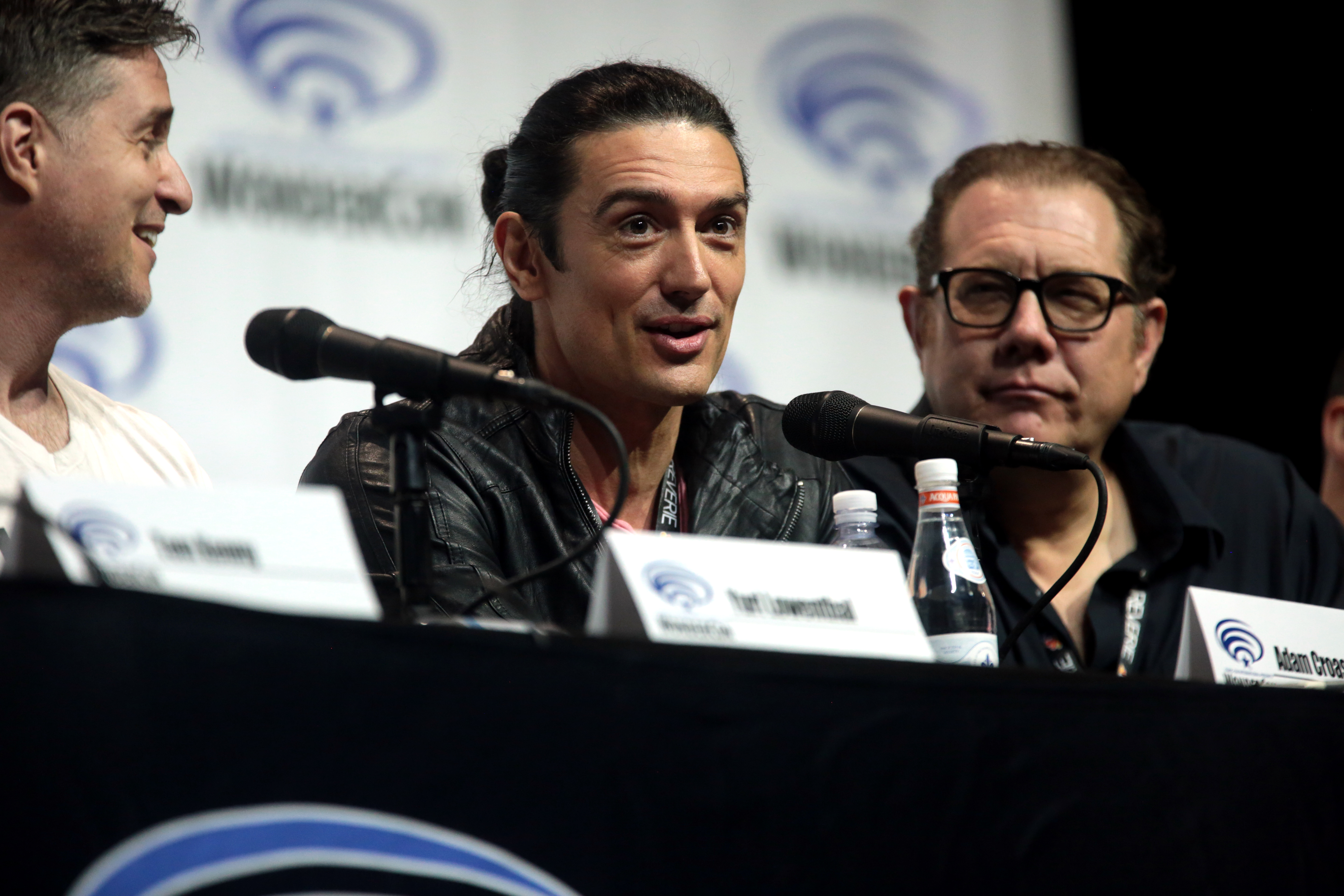
Croasdell with Fred Tatasciore and Yuri Lowenthal at the premier of Batman Ninja

== Filmography ==
=== Film ===
Year	Title	Role	Notes
1998	Tarzan and the Lost City	Lewis	Credited as Adam Crousdale
2000	Fatboy and Twintub	Twintub	Short film
2002	Flyfishing	Phil	
2004	Nature Unleashed: Avalanche	Thom	
2006	Attack Force	Aroon	
2006	True True Lie	Shaun Rednik	
2007	Too Much Too Young	Baz Chambers	
2007	God's Wounds	Tony Clements	
2008	The Prince and Me 3: A Royal Honeymoon	Scott	
2012	Werewolf: The Beast Among Us	Stefan	
2013	Saving Lincoln	Elmer E. Ellsworth	
2013	Stevie the Hopposaurus	Narrator	Voice; Short film
2013	Extraction	Alexi Vodanova	
2016	Hatchet Hour	Isaac "Izzy" Friedman	
2016	Kingsglaive: Final Fantasy XV	Ignis Scientia	Voice; English dub
2018	Batman Ninja	Alfred Pennyworth, Nightwing, Laughing Mask Samurai	Voice, direct-to-video
2021	The Witcher: Nightmare of the Wolf	King Dagread, Nobleman	Voice; Netflix film
2025	The Electric State	The Marshall, Taco Bot, Sentry Bot, Blitz	Motion capture Netflix film
2026	The Odyssey	Antinous’ Father	

=== Television ===
Year	Title	Role	Notes
1997	Natural Rhythm	Joel Cunningham	Miniseries
2000	The Creatives	Franck	Episode: "Lenny the Bruce"
2000	Holby City	Marcus Sanders / Jason Hicks	Episode: "The Trouble with the Truth"
2001	Smack the Pony	Various	5 episodes
2001	Risk	Jim	Episode: "Kim Goes Undercover"
2001	Peak Practice	Tony Preston	2 episodes
2001	Dark Realm	Mike	Episode: "Johnny's Guitar"
2002	As If	Tom	Episode: "Nicki's POV"
2002	London's Burning	Fraser	1 episode
2002	The Project	Josh	Television film
2003	Lenny Henry in Pieces	Paul	1 episode
2003	Leonardo	Michelangelo	Episode: "Dangerous Liaisons"
2005	Ultimate Force	Pierre Du Preez	Episode: "Never Go Back"
2007	The Chase	Sebastian Montgomery	9 episodes
2008	Heartbeat	Chaz Enderby	Episode: "The Devil Rides Out"
2008	Agatha Christie's Poirot	Adam Goodman	Episode: "Cat Among the Pigeons"
2009–10	EastEnders	Dr. Al Jenkins	43 episodes
2010	Supernatural	Baldur	Episode: "Hammer of the Gods"
2011	Body of Proof	Ronan Gallagher	Episode: "Gross Anatomy"
2012	Bond, James Bond	James Bond	6 episodes
2013	NCIS: Los Angeles	Jamal Avlurov	Episode: "The Chosen One"
2013	Nikita	Kosta Bechiraj	Episode: "Brave New World"
2014–20	Doc McStuffins	Wildlife Will	Voice, 9 episodes
2014–16	NCIS	Young Angus Clarke	3 episodes
2015	Hot in Cleveland	Earl of Cleveland	Episode: "We Could Be Royals"
2015	Guy Theory	Aaron Alexander	Episode: "Perfect Storm"
2015	The Exes	Chris	Episode: "Knotting Phil"
2015	Once Upon a Time	Brennan Jones	Episode: "Swan Song"
2015	Change of Heart	Jared Blasco	Television film
2016	#TheAssignment	Adam	14 episodes
2017	Reign	Bothwell	10 episodes
2018	Preacher	Eccarius	6 episodes
2018	Castlevania	Additional voices	Voice, 8 episodes
2020	Glitch Techs	Count Nogrog, Blade Demon	Voice, episode: "Castle Crawl"
2020–2025	Blood of Zeus	Apollo, Hephaestus	Voice, 10 episodes
2020	It's Pony	Hero Horse, Wild Starillion, Announcer	Voice, 2 episodes
2021–2023	Ridley Jones	Lemur Dad, Penguin, King George	Voice, 5 episodes
2022	Pam & Tommy	Simon	Episode: "Pamela in Wonderland"
2022	Monarch	Clive Grayson	5 episodes

=== Video games ===
Year	Title	Role	Notes	Source
2010	James Bond 007: Blood Stone	James Bond	Also motion capture	
2012	Fable: The Journey	Ghost #1		
2013	Dead Island: Riptide	John Morgan		
2014	Middle-earth: Shadow of Mordor	Torvin		
2015	The Order: 1886	Additional voices		
2016	Call of Duty: Infinite Warfare	The Rat King	Shaolin Shuffle DLC	
2016	Final Fantasy XV	Ignis Scientia		
2017	Halo Wars 2	Additional voices		
2017	Middle-earth: Shadow of War	Torvin	Desolation of Mordor DLC	
2018	World of Warcraft: Battle for Azeroth	Additional voices		
2018	Fallout 76	Various		
2019	Judgment	Akira Murase		
2019	Call of Duty: Modern Warfare	Additional voices		
2020	Borderlands 3	Eista	Guns, Love and Tentacles: The Marriage of Wainwright & Hammerlock DLC	
2021	Lost Judgment	Queen Rouge Owner		
2022	Tactics Ogre: Reborn	Gildas W. Byrne		
2025	Date Everything!	The Sassy Chap		
2025	Dune Awakening	Piter De Vries, Lanov, Cyprian Io		
