= Ignis Scientia =

Supporting character of Final Fantasy XV

- Final Fantasy character
- Render of Ignis as he appears in Final Fantasy XV.
- First appearance: Brotherhood: Final Fantasy XV (2016)
- First game: Final Fantasy XV (2016)
- Created by: Tetsuya Nomura
- Designed by: Tetsuya Nomura; Hiromu Takahara
- Voiced by: EN: Adam Croasdell; JP: Mamoru Miyano
- Motion capture: Naoki Terui

Ignis Scientia (Japanese: イグニス・スキエンティア, Hepburn: Igunisu Sukientia) is a character from Square Enix's Final Fantasy series. He first appears in the anime web series Brotherhood: Final Fantasy XV as an advisor for the royal family of the Kingdom of Lucis and a personal attendant of its heir apparent prince Noctis Lucis Caelum. In the 2016 mainline title Final Fantasy XV, Ignis and his companions oppose the rival empire of Niflheim and its efforts to dominate the world of Eos. The character's story arc in the main narrative of XV culminates in him being permanently blinded, although he eventually acclimatizes to his condition and continues to be an active member of the player's party. He is the title character of the post-launch downloadable content (DLC) pack Episode Ignis, which explores the circumstances that led to his blinding.

Created and co-designed by Tetsuya Nomura for the precursor to Final Fantasy XV, a spin-off titled Final Fantasy Versus XIII, Ignis' personality was designed to be expressed in his looks, the way he speaks, and his gestures. Ignis is closely associated with the game's food and recipe mechanic, which confers various statistical benefits for the party following each session. Outside of Final Fantasy XV, Ignis is featured in adaptations of the game's universe in other media, as well as several crossover appearances.

Following the release of XV, Ignis has been positively received by video game publications, with some lauding him as a well developed supporting character and one of the best characters in the Final Fantasy franchise. Ignis' mannerisms as well as his association with the food and cooking mechanic of XV has attracted a substantial fan following surrounding the character, whereas the representation of his disability later in the game's narrative have attracted praise as a compelling and inspiring portrayal of an individual living with a disability.

== Concept and design ==
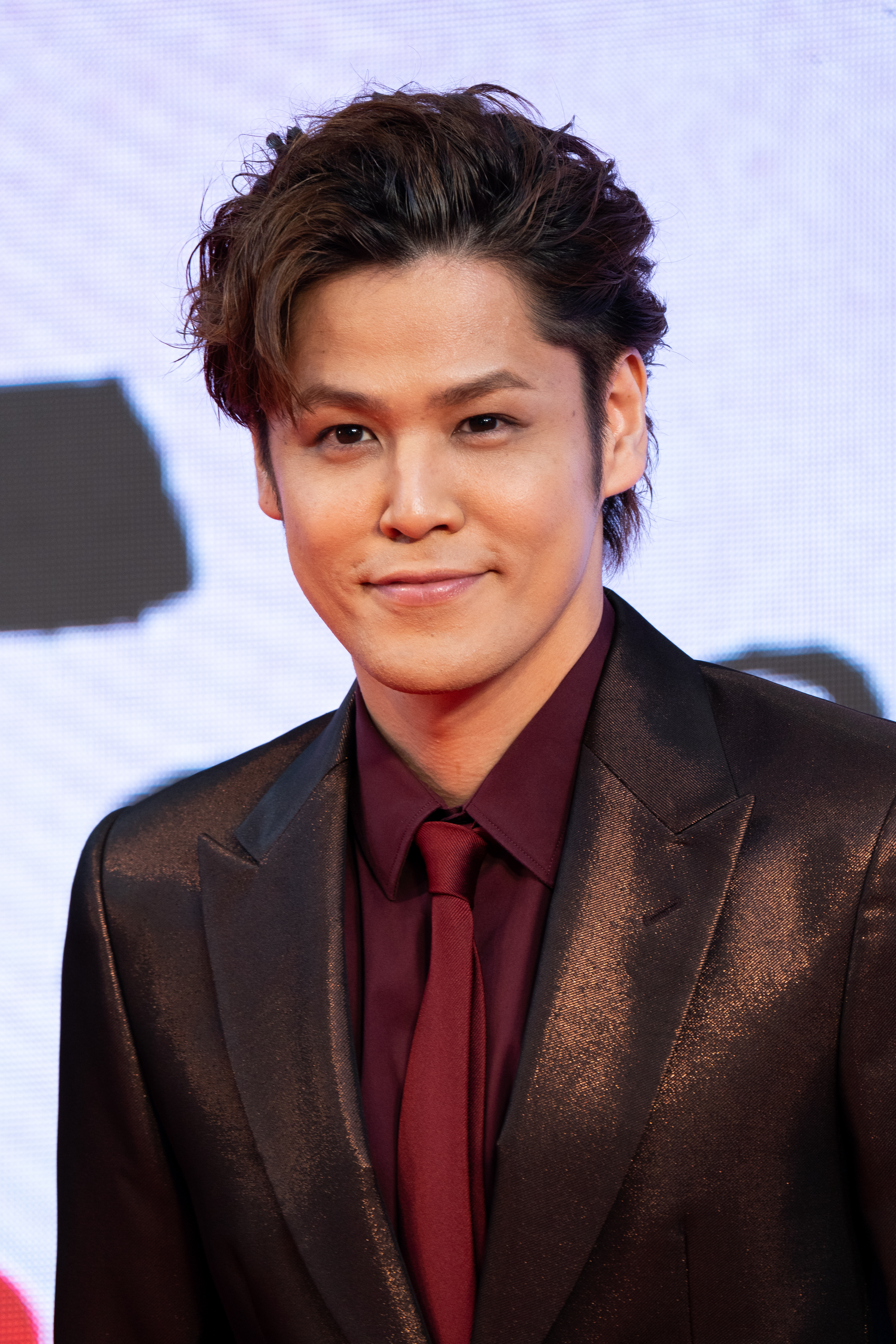
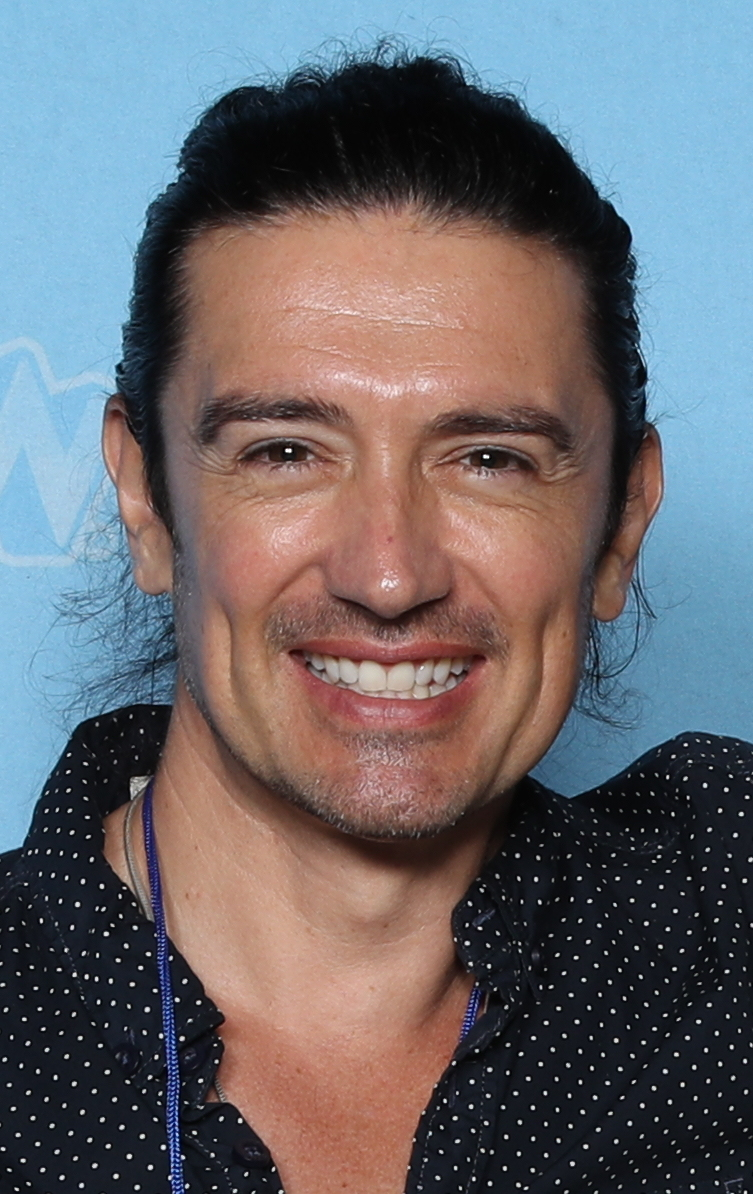
Mamoru Miyano (left) and Adam Croasdell (right) voiced Ignis.

Ignis is presented as an attendant who serves the royal household of the Kingdom of Lucis, as well as a highly trained tactical advisor who supports its king in a manner that parallels the role of the United Kingdom's Lord Chamberlain of the Household. Out of the main cast, Ignis went through the fewest changes despite the technological improvements that occurred during the shift from Versus XIII and Final Fantasy XV. The character's full name was originally given as Ignis Stupeo Scientia in promotional material, but is not used following the release of XV. To reflect his position as Noctis's protector from a young age, he was made to look more toned and his musculature was developed, particularly around the neck. Care was taken to retain his intellectual look. According to game director Hajime Tabata, his team strove for a game design early on in the development that follows a cycle where characters have adventures during the daytime, and at night they camp and eat in order to prepare themselves for the following day. His role as the party's cook came about when considering which among them would be most likely to take up that duty. His cooking skills are explained in-game to exchanges with Noctis during their early lives.

The English localization of XV was led by Dan Inoue, who wrote Ignis to be a suave and logical character like a younger version of James Bond or Sherlock Holmes. Ignis speaks with a British accent while the other main characters spoke with an American accent; the localization team intended to convey the notion that the game's cast of characters hail from different cultural regions of the world of Eos. Ignis is voiced by Adam Croasdell in English, while his counterpart in Japanese is Mamoru Miyano. Croasdell described Ignis as a cerebral and organized planner who is highly capable, and "quite funny without meaning to be", and also the serious and responsible member who tries to keep the rest of the group out of trouble. To prepare for his role, Croasdell frequently sang to himself in the car, and consumed green apples to suppress clicking sounds in the mouth whenever he speaks into the microphone. Reflecting on his experience working in the game, Croasdell said that he had ample opportunities to draw upon his life experiences and project them into his portrayal of Ignis' perspective. He also noted that the entire cast had the opportunity to record together on numerous occasions, which helped build the repartee and bond between the performers whenever they would perform as their characters. Croasdell was particularly fond of the vocalized variations of Noctis' nickname ("Noct") whenever he performed in character as Ignis.

The score for Episode Ignis, a downloadable content (DLC) expansion which features Ignis as the central protagonist, was composed by Japanese musician Yasunori Mitsuda. Episode Ignis marked Mitsuda's first collaboration project with Square Enix in 20 years. A self-described fan of the character who has played Final Fantasy XV following its release and is familiar with its story, Mitsuda disclosed in an interview with VG247 that he may not have accepted Square Enix's invitation to score the DLC episode had it not featured Ignis. To Mitsuda, the most appealing aspect of Ignis's character is his intense desire to protect what matters to him and his willingness to sacrifice himself in the process. Mitsuda wanted the DLC's music, which is heavily strings-driven with a full orchestra sound that is slightly influenced by the music of Chrono Cross, to fully convey Ignis' character arc. He decided to represent him using a single violin, despite the risk of the more bombastic orchestral elements obscuring the violin work. Having worked closely with director Takeshi Terada to realize his vision for the DLC's characters, Mitsuda wanted to leave the impression that both Ignis and Ravus are strong characters by expressing their back-and-forth alliance and rivalry through his music.

== Appearances ==
=== Final Fantasy XV ===
Ignis is introduced as a member of the royal retinue of Noctis Lucis Caelum, crown prince of Lucis, a monarchical state in the world of Eos. He is the primary designated driver of the party's automobile, the Regalia, and would prepare meals that provides various statistical benefits for the party whenever they set camp. Ignis wields daggers and polearms in battle; when controlling Noctis, the player can issue him commands and co-opt moves with him, including the ability to add elemental damage to Noctis's weapon. Following a major 2018 update for XV, player may assume direct control of Ignis, who may infuse his own dagger attacks with elemental damage. Each element gives him a different property in battle: fire focuses on heavy single-target damage, lighting allows him to cover vast distances between enemies, and ice inflicts area damage to groups of enemies in close proximity to each other. Ignis has a composed and serious personality, though he frequently exchanges banter with the rest of the party and occasionally make puns or sarcastic quips.

Alongside Gladiolus Amicitia and Prompto, Ignis accompanies Noctis on a road journey to the city-state of Altissia, where he is set to marry Lady Lunafreya Nox Fleuret from the realm of Tenebrae. Shortly after the party's arrival in Altissia, the city-state became the site of a massive battle involving an invading Niflheim force and one of the deities of Eos, Leviathan. Ignis is permanently blinded in the aftermath of Altissia's destruction, which instigates a period of conflict and tension between as the other members of the retinue struggle to process their hardships and loss. The world is soon overtaken by a plague of darkness and monstrous daemons unleashed by Ardyn Izunia, the former chancellor of the Niflheim empire, with Ignis and the others separated from Noctis following an incident at Gralea, the capital city of Niflheim. Ignis eventually acclimatizes to his disability and learns to fight effectively as a Daemon hunter without his eyesight. Following their reunion a decade later, Ignis accompanies Noctis to his final confrontation with Ardyn in the ruins of Insomnia, the former Lucian capital.

Episode Ignis reveals that Ignis was raised alongside Noctis from a young age, and that they were both close as children. The DLC episode recounts Ignis' activities during the Niflheim invasion of Altissia, where he temporarily works with Lunafreya's brother Ravus as they work together to search for Noctis and Lunafreya. The DLC reveals how Ignis became blinded after he uses Noctis' family heirloom, the magical Ring of the Lucii, to fight off Ardyn. Episode Ignis also features an alternate ending as part of its branching narrative, where Ignis successfully defeats Ardyn and manages to prevent the world's grim fate from the original timeline to come to pass using his ingenuity.

=== Other appearances ===
Brotherhood: Final Fantasy XV establishes that Ignis continues to care for Noctis after he moves out of the royal residence to further his studies, and makes regular visits to his residence to perform domestic duties.

Ignis has appeared in numerous video games outside of Final Fantasy XV and its associated downloadable content, including Final Fantasy XV: A New Empire, King's Knight: Wrath of the Dark Dragon, Theatrhythm Final Fantasy All-Star Carnival, Final Fantasy Record Keeper, and Dissidia Final Fantasy Opera Omnia.

== Promotion and reception ==
In early 2016, action figures of Ignis alongside Noctis, Gladiolus and Prompto were produced by Play Arts Kai and distributed for sale by Square Enix on its online store to promote the then-upcoming release of Final Fantasy XV. In February 2017, Square Enix announced that the character's birthday is February 7, and released a mask of Ignis with instructions for players to print and cutout to celebrate the occasion.

Ignis ranked No. 28 in the Top 75 of NHK's "All-Final Fantasy Grand Poll of Japanese players" in 2020, which tallied over 468,000 votes. Game Informer, in its "RPG of the Year" awards, awarded the "Best Sidekick" category to Ignis for the "multifaceted ways he helps the group and the sacrifices he makes". Ignis is a popular subject for fan mods on the PC version of XV following the release of its mod tools on Steam Workshop in June 2018.

In a discussion among US Gamer staff for their nominees for the best 2016 sidekick character in video gaming, Kat Bailey said Ignis was her choice, explaining that "the turn his character takes and the effect that it has on the party" is why she thought of him as the most significant among the secondary characters of XV. Assessing the Episode Duscae demo for XV in 2015, Ron Duwell from Techno Buffalo found Ignis to be its most memorable character as well as his favorite due to the nature of his interactions with Noctis, commenting that it is an uncommon dynamic and less cliched then the common "childhood friends" trope found in most JRPG's. Peter Glagowski from Destructoid said Ignis was his favorite character of the group. Samuel Roberts from PC Gamer chose Ignis as his favorite character from the Final Fantasy series, and credited the game's "more detailed interactions" with party companions in comparison to past titles as an important influence on his choice. Peter Glagowski from Destructoid and Ash Parrish from Kotaku considered Ignis to be their favorite character amongst the quartet. Her overall second favorite character in the Final Fantasy series, Parrish appreciated his characterization as a "fiercely intelligent and loyal control freak" who is determined to feed the group, as well as his "borderline stoic exterior" who becomes highly protective of his group when they are threatened. John-Paul Jones from Green Man Gaming included Ignis in his 2021 list of the best Final Fantasy characters, and called him the "bedrock of Final Fantasy XV's quartet of road trip-hopping protagonists". Ignis is recognized as a notable role for Croasdell, who was nominated for Best Male Vocal Performance in Video Games at the 2017 BTVA Awards for his performance as the character.

For many players, Ignis' food preparation activities is one of the highlights of Final Fantasy XV. Andrew Webster from The Verge said Ignis' cooking do more than just provide statistical bonuses, as it provides players with a bonding experience which connects them to its main cast of characters. Corey Plante highlighted Ignis' recurring catchphrase and mannerisms whenever a new recipe is discovered to be very satisfying, and that the game's food mechanic provides "an intimate look into how to nurture friendship" through the characters' mutual love of food. In article published by Paste Magazine, Salvatore Pane described Ignis' role within the group as the "brains, the cook, the hipster who wears glasses not because he needs them but because they look cool". In an article for ComicsVerse, Peter Swann noted that Ignis Scientia is a character who subverts notions of gender stereotypes in popular media; while he is the group's strategist, he is also for all intents and purposes a mother figure who cooks, cares for and cleans up after Noctis. Swann is particularly amused by the relationship dynamic between Ignis and Gladiolus where they bicker over how to deal with Noctis' habits as a picky eater, and compared them to a married couple. Ciann Chow from SBS Food said Ignis is a fan favorite and the "break-out meme star" of XV, highlighting in particular his repertoire of more than 100 recipes from the in-game menu, his distinct British accent, and his memorable catchphrase. Chow observed that notable food brands like Tastemade have developed media which references Ignis, and he drew such a significant fan following that a cookbook was assembled and published by a fan volunteer effort. The cookbook is named after Ignis' "That's It!" catchphrase.

The character's appearance in Episode Ignis has received some positive reviews. Chris Carter from Destructoid found Ignis to be less showy compared to his companions, but felt that the development team translated his resourceful quality well with the gameplay of the DLC. Robert Ramsey from Push Square praised the DLC as the best in the character-driven Episode series, and said Ignis' "flashy, fast, and fluid fighting style" is likely the most enjoyable among Noctis' companions, which keeps enemy encounters engaging. Parrish concurred that "Ignis is by far the most fun to play", and said that she particularly enjoyed the smooth transition between different elemental powers and their associated mechanics when dealing with enemy units during intense combat sequences.

Not all reception to Ignis has been positive. Allegra Frank and Simone de Rochefort from Polygon decided that he is the least physically appealing member of the quartet. Mitchel Clow was not particularly impressed with Episode Ignis and found it a bit boring and repetitive, though he conceded that Ignis himself has the "most fun gameplay mechanics" and that his story mattered unlike Gladiolus and Prompto. Peter Tieryas criticized the confusing manner in which the story of XV is occasionally presented, claimed that he did not realized that Ignis had lost his eyesight until some of his dialogue implied as much, and suggested that such a pivotal event for a main character should have been shown within the story instead of being relegated to DLC content. Duwell noted that some fans took issue with how the relationship between Noctis and Ignis is portrayed in English, and that they preferred the original Japanese dialogue where Ignis interacts with Noctis in a more casual tone in spite of the latter's royal status.

The dramatic shift in tone following Chapter Nine of XV where it is revealed that Ignis has permanently lost his eyesight have been positively appraised. Glagowski and Parrish both said they were emotionally devastated by the plot development; Parrish identified strongly with the loyal and self-sacrificing "sworn-knight" archetype embodied by Ignis, while his predicament resonated with Glagowski's own fear of loss of vision. Pane highlighted the aftermath of Ignis' permanent disability and the rising tensions between members of the group as one of the best sequences he has ever experienced in a videogame, as it accurately portrays how teenage boys cope with grief in his view. The Perkins School for the Blind published an article in 2019 which details how several XV players from various countries were inspired by Ignis' disability to support the organization by launching Sagefire, a fanzine which celebrates XV with fan art and fan fiction, with portions of the proceeds from its presale to be donated to Perkins. Fans who were surveyed by the article explained that they were moved by the representation of Ignis acclimatizing and adjusting to his disability. According to Croasdell, the Ignis Sagefire fanzine successfully raised thousands of dollars on behalf of Perkins.
