= No Drums, No Bugles =

1972 film directed by Clyde Ware

- Theatrical release poster
- Directed by: Clyde Ware
- Written by: Clyde Ware
- Produced by: Clyde Ware
- Starring: Martin Sheen; Davey Davison; Rod McCary; Denine Terry
- Cinematography: Parker Bartlett; Richard P. McCarty
- Edited by: David Bretherton; Richard Halsey
- Music by: Lyle Ritz
- Production company: Jud-Lee Productions
- Distributed by: Cinerama Releasing Corporation
- Release date: February 23, 1972
- Running time: 85 minutes
- Country: United States
- Language: English

No Drums, No Bugles is a 1972 American drama film written, produced and directed by Clyde Ware. The film stars Martin Sheen, Davey Davison, Rod McCary and Denine Terry. The film was released on February 23, 1972, by Cinerama Releasing Corporation.

== Cast ==
- Martin Sheen as Ashby Gatrell
- Davey Davison as Callie Gatrell
- Rod McCary as Lieutenant
- Denine Terry as Sarah
- Carmen Costi as Foxhunter
- Ray Marsh as Foxhunter
- Frank Stubock as Foxhunter
- Bob Wagner as Foxhunter
- Eeward Underwood as Foxhunter
