= Salvador Litvak =

American film director

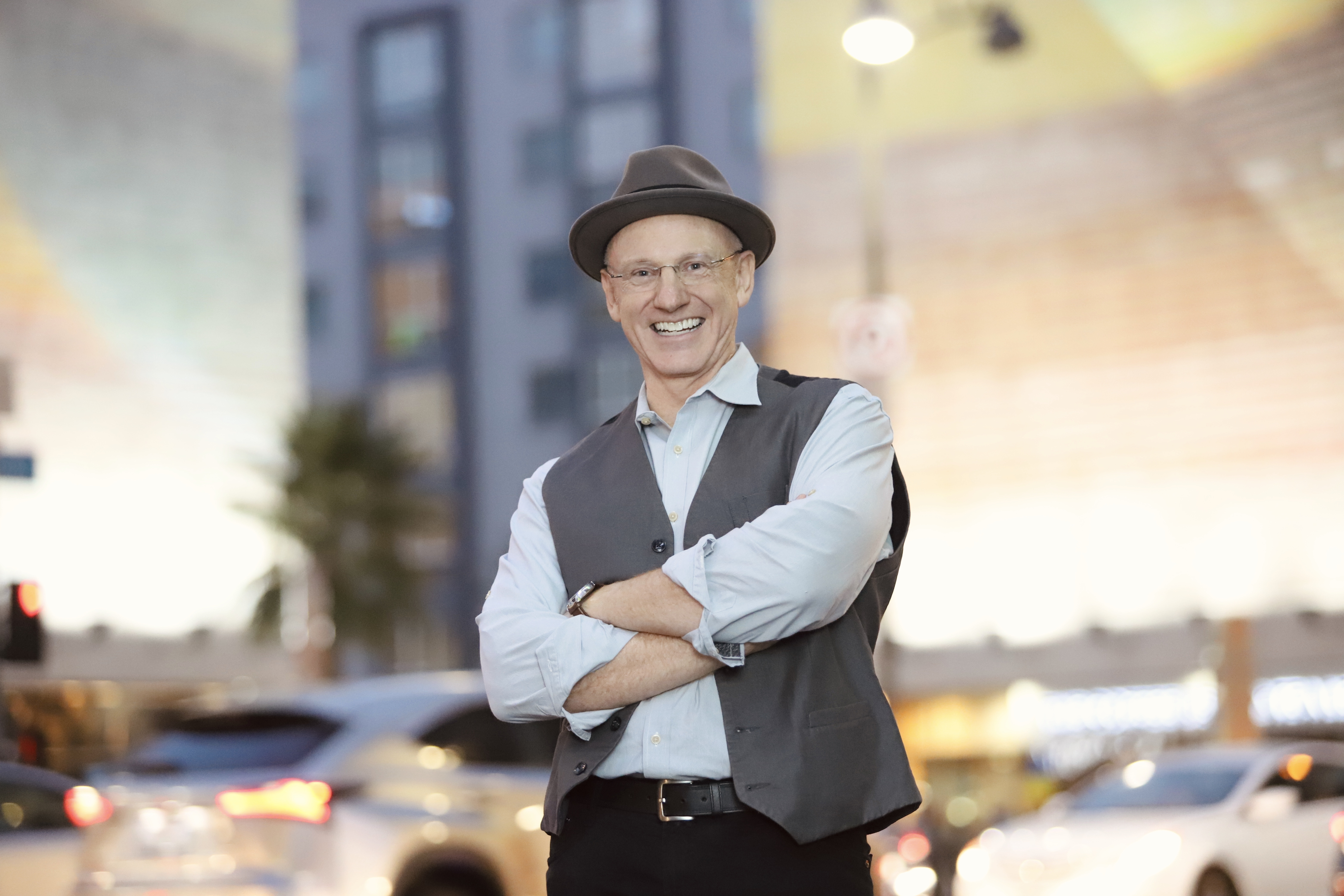
- Salvador Litvak in Los Angeles in 2017
- Born: 1965 (age 60–61); Santiago, Chile
- Other name: Accidental Talmudist
- Occupations: Director, screenwriter, producer
- Years active: 1994–present
- Spouse: Nina Davidovich Litvak

Salvador Alejandro Litvak is a Chilean-American filmmaker, author, and social media influencer. He has written and directed three theatrically released feature films, When Do We Eat? (2006), Saving Lincoln (2013), and Guns & Moses (2025). As the Accidental Talmudist, Litvak shares Jewish wisdom with over one million followers on his Facebook page and hosts AT Daily, a Talmud study show on Facebook Live and YouTube. His first book, "Let My People Laugh: The Greatest Jewish Jokes of All Time!" was released by Skyhorse Publishing in November, 2024.

== Early life and education ==
Litvak was born in Santiago, Chile, in 1965 and came to the United States at the age of five. He grew up in Riverdale and New City, New York. He majored in English at Harvard, where he rowed on the heavyweight crew team. He then moved on to NYU Law School, earned his Juris Doctor degree, and passed the New York State Bar Exam. Between moving to the US and graduating from law school, Litvak went by an anglicized version of his middle name, Alex.

Litvak stated in an Instagram reel that he was relatively secular in his youth, but reconnected with his Judaism after a period spiritual seeking and his grandmother's passing.

While attending law school, Litvak mounted a series of multimedia performance art pieces in Greenwich Village. After finishing law school, he worked as a mergers and acquisitions lawyer at Skadden Arps while continuing his writing. After two years, he left the practice of law to enroll in the graduate Directors' Program at the UCLA School of Theater, Film & Television, where he earned a Master of Fine Arts degree.

== Career ==
Litvak formed a production company, Pictures From the Fringe. With his wife Nina Davidovich, Litvak wrote When Do We Eat?, a comedic Passover film about a dysfunctional Jewish family celebrating "the world's fastest seder." Litvak directed the film and partnered with executive producer Horatio Kemeny to make When Do We Eat? independently. The film's ensemble cast includes Lesley Ann Warren, Michael Lerner, Max Greenfield, Shiri Appleby, Ben Feldman and Jack Klugman in his final film role. When Do We Eat? was released theatrically by THINKFilm in 34 cities in 2006.

Litvak followed it up with Saving Lincoln in 2013, based on the true story of Abraham Lincoln and his self-appointed bodyguard, Ward Hill Lamon. Saving Lincoln features a visual style invented by Litvak named CineCollage, in which live action elements are inserted into 3D environments composited from vintage photographs. Litvak raised post-production funds on Kickstarter. He contributed an essay to the Abraham Lincoln Presidential Library's book Gettysburg Replies.

In 2012, Litvak finished reading the entire Talmud after participating in the 7.5 year Daf Yomi cycle. Wanting to share the wisdom he learned, Litvak started a blog and a Facebook page called Accidental Talmudist. Together with his wife Nina, Litvak shares Jewish wisdom, faith, culture, history and music with over a million followers. Litvak also edits the Table For Five column for The Jewish Journal of Greater Los Angeles in which in five writers comment on a verse from the weekly Torah portion. In 2019, Litvak partnered with the Jewish Journal to launch The Accidental Talmudist Podcast.

Litvak teaches AT Daily, a livestreaming Talmud class on Facebook and YouTube.

In December 2022, principal photography wrapped on the action thriller Guns & Moses, directed by Litvak and featuring Mark Feuerstein, Neal McDonough, Dermot Mulroney, Christopher Lloyd, and Alona Tal. Guns & Moses is the story of a beloved small-town rabbi who becomes an unlikely gunslinger after his community is violently attacked. The film premiered at the Los Angeles Jewish Film Festival on June 19, 2024. It had a theatrical release in the United States on July 18, 2025, and a second theatrical release is scheduled for September 7, 2025 through September 11, 2025.

Salvador Litvak is an active member of Magen Am USA, a security organization that trains Jews to become fully licensed armed guards for their synagogues. His extensive firearm training and knowledge of gun safety lent authenticity to the range scenes in Guns & Moses. Litvak said. “The cliché in movies is that when a civilian learns to wield a gun, there's a 30-second montage of him shooting cans off a fence, and suddenly he's an expert gunman. We made sure that the firearm use was accurate.”

Litvak tells classic Jewish jokes on Instagram and TikTok. After his videos started going viral, Litvak signed a book deal with Skyhorse Publishing. His first book "Let My People Laugh, The Greatest Jewish Jokes of All Time!" was released on November 27, 2024.
