= The Story of Pretty Boy Floyd =

- Genre: Crime; Drama
- Written by: Clyde Ware
- Directed by: Clyde Ware
- Starring: Martin Sheen; Kim Darby; Michael Parks
- Theme music composer: Pete Rugolo
- Country of origin: United States
- Original language: English

Production
- Executive producer: Roy Huggins
- Producer: Jo Swerling Jr.
- Cinematography: J.J. Jones
- Editors: Gloryette Clark; Chuck McClelland
- Running time: 90 minutes
- Production companies: Universal Television; Universal/Public Arts Production

Original release
- Network: ABC
- Release: May 7, 1974

The Story of Pretty Boy Floyd is a 1974 TV film about famous bank-robber Charles Arthur Floyd, "the Robin Hood of the Cookson Hills"--here portrayed as a decent man who has a strong sense of family and duty. It was written and directed by Clyde Ware and aired as an ABC Movie of the Week on May 7, 1974.

== Cast ==
- Martin Sheen as Charles Arthur 'Pretty Boy' Floyd
- Kim Darby as Ruby Hardgrave
- Michael Parks as Bradley Floyd
- Steven Keats as Eddie Richetti
- Ellen Corby as Ma Floyd
- Abe Vigoda as Dominic Morrell
- Joe Estevez as E.W. Floyd
- Ford Rainey as Mr. Suggs
- Misty Rowe as Blonde

== Reception ==
The Los Angeles Times said the film was the best of all the Great Depression-era gangster films that followed the success of Bonnie and Clyde (1967).

The Washington Post called it "a slick piece of work, smoothly constructed, ably photographed, convincingly acted."
