= Guns & Moses =

2024 American crime thriller film

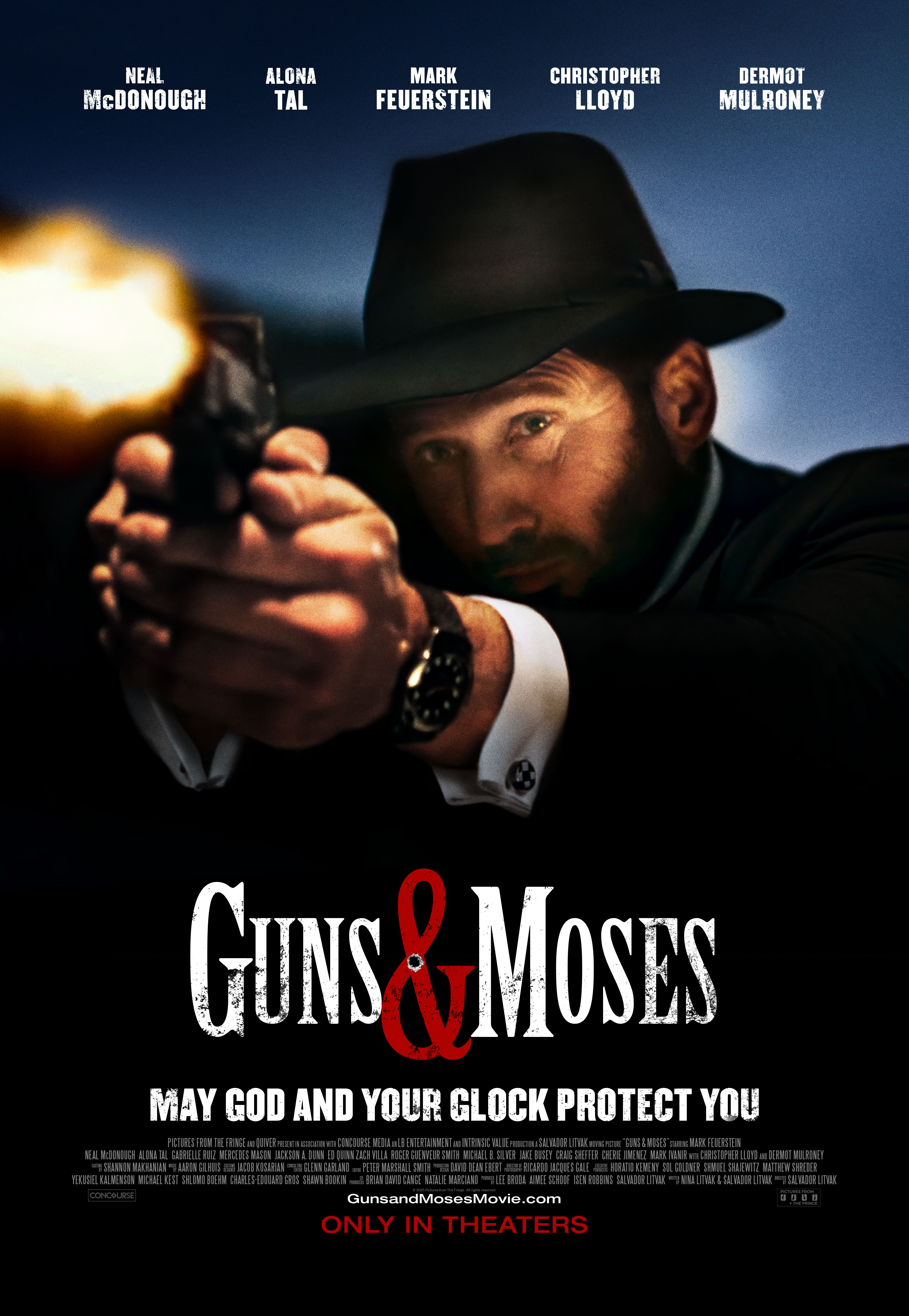
- Release poster
- Directed by: Salvador Litvak
- Written by: Nina Davidovich Litvak; Salvador Litvak
- Produced by: Lee Broda; Aimee Schoof; Isen Robbins; Salvador Litvak
- Starring: Mark Feuerstein; Neal McDonough; Alona Tal; Dermot Mulroney; Christopher Lloyd
- Cinematography: Ricardo Jacques Gale
- Edited by: Peter Marshall Smith
- Music by: Aaron Gilhuis
- Production companies: LB Entertainment; Intrinsic Value Films; Pictures From The Fringe
- Distributed by: Concourse Media
- Release dates: June 19, 2024 (Los Angeles Jewish Film Festival); July 18, 2025 (United States)
- Running time: 94 minutes
- Country: United States
- Language: English
- Box office: $77,433

Guns & Moses (formerly titled Man in the Long Black Coat) is an American crime thriller film written by Nina Davidovich Litvak and Salvador Litvak, directed by Salvador Litvak and starring Mark Feuerstein, Neal McDonough, Dermot Mulroney and Christopher Lloyd. It premiered in the 2024 Los Angeles Jewish Film Festival and was released theatrically on July 18, 2025, by Pictures From The Fringe and Concourse Media.

== Premise ==
A beloved rabbi in a high desert town becomes an unlikely gunfighter after his community is violently attacked.

== Plot ==
Rabbi Moses (Moyshe) Zaltzman, with his wife and five children, is an Orthodox Rabbi (Chabad, although it is never mentioned and shows up only subtly) in the town of High Desert, California. At a town gala for the High Desert Jewish Center (synagogue) where local philanthropist Alan Rosner is being honored for his contributions to the community, Rosner pledges $2 million to the Center just before he is shot by an unknown assailant.

The local police arrest Clay Gibbons, who has a history of Nazi-like threatening of the Jewish community. Everyone except the Rabbi thinks Clay is guilty. The Rabbi had an experience of welcoming Clay when he was threatening the community, and teaching him about the Holocaust and Jewish history (with the help of Sol Fassbinder, a Holocaust survivor who tells his story first-hand), and keeps saying that since Clay "ate the brownie" the Rabbi had offered, Clay could not be guilty.

The story develops with additional murders of key characters, and the issue appears to be about a land deal. The synagogue's security person, non-Jewish Brenda Navarro, insists that the Rabbi and his wife get training in how to shoot, and insists that the Rabbi carry a gun.

In the end, the local police and mayor, who had been in the military together, had framed Clay and they try to kill the Rabbi and his family. With the help of allies including Clay and his father and Navarro, the Rabbi and his family win out in the end, and the bad guys are killed.

== Cast ==
- Mark Feuerstein as Rabbi Mo Zaltzman
- Neal McDonough as Mayor Donovan Kirk
- Dermot Mulroney as Alan Rosner
- Christopher Lloyd as Sol Fassbinder
- Alona Tal as Hindy Zaltzman
- Jake Busey as Owen Gibbons
- Craig Sheffer as Tibor Farkas
- Michael B. Silver as Jeff Rosner
- Zach Villa as Detective Nestor
- Ed Quinn as Detective Wallace
- Gabrielle Ruiz as Brenda Navarro
- Mercedes Mason as Liat Rosner
- Jackson Dunn as Clay Gibbons
- Mila Brener as Esty Zaltzman
- JuJu Brener as Dini Zaltzman
- Joshua Gallup as Yossi Zaltzman

== Jewish Sect ==
Rabbi Mo and his family are portrayed to be part of the Chabad Lubavitch sect. While not mentioned by name in the film, there is a scene in his house where a picture of the former head of Lubavitch, Menachem Mendel Schneerson, appears, as is customary within their sect. Judaism is a non-proselytizing religion, in particular to those who are non-Jews; however, Chabad is an internal-proselytizing sect within Judaism, where they will try to convince other Jews to "act like them". Therefore, in the film, the character of Clay Gibbons would not have been asked to convert, and is only asked to empathize with the Jews themselves. Chabad sends "missionaries" across the world to help Jewish communities, as well as Jews of any sub-denomination, without any expectation of monetary gain, which is also why the donation given to build the Jewish Center is also considered such a "Mitzvah" (good deed).

== Production ==
In December 2022, it was announced that Feuerstein, McDonough, Mulroney and Lloyd had been cast in the film, with filming beginning in Santa Clarita, California. In January 2023, it was announced that Tal, Busey and Sheffer, as well as other actors, had been cast in the film.

== Release ==
The film premiered at the Los Angeles Jewish Film Festival on June 19, 2024. It was theatrically released in the United States on July 18, 2025.

A second theatrical release was scheduled for September 7, 2025, through September 11, 2025.
