= Spaceman (2016 film) =

- Film poster
- Directed by: Brett Rapkin
- Written by: Brett Rapkin
- Produced by: Éric Gagné; Ben Lyons; Stephen Nemeth; Brett Rapkin; Ron Shelton; Betsy Stahl
- Starring: Josh Duhamel; Ernie Hudson; W. Earl Brown; Sterling K. Brown
- Cinematography: Matthew Boyd
- Edited by: Colleen Halsey; Richard Halsey
- Music by: Billy Mallery
- Production companies: Podium Pictures; Rhino Films
- Distributed by: Orion Pictures; FilmBuff
- Release date: August 19, 2016 (US)
- Running time: 90 minutes
- Country: United States
- Language: English

Spaceman is a 2016 biographical film about former Major League Baseball pitcher Bill "Spaceman" Lee written and directed by Brett Rapkin and starring Josh Duhamel as Lee.

== Premise ==
Spaceman is the true story of former Major League Baseball pitcher Bill "Spaceman" Lee following his release from the Montreal Expos.

== Cast ==
- Josh Duhamel as Bill "Spaceman" Lee
- Ernie Hudson as Joe
- W. Earl Brown as Dick Dennis
- Sterling K. Brown as Rodney Scott
- Peter Mackenzie as Tim Manning
- Emma Rose Maloney as Caitlin Lee
- Wallace Langham as Bruce Lindsay
- Wade Williams as Tom Fulton

== See also ==
- List of baseball films
