= The Alamo: 13 Days to Glory =

1987 TV film

- Print advertisement
- Genre: Western
- Based on: 13 Days to Glory: The Siege of the Alamo by Lon Tinkle
- Teleplay by: Clyde Ware; Norman McLeod Morrill
- Directed by: Burt Kennedy; David S Cass
- Starring: James Arness; Brian Keith; Alec Baldwin; David Ogden Stiers; Raul Julia; Lorne Greene
- Music by: Peter Bernstein
- Country of origin: United States
- Original language: English

Production
- Executive producers: Stockton Briggle; Richard Carrothers; Dennis D. Hennessy
- Producers: Bill Finnegan; Patricia Finnegan; Sheldon Pinchuk
- Cinematography: John Elsenbach
- Editor: Michael N. Knue
- Running time: 170 minutes
- Production companies: Briggle, Hennessey, Carrothers & Associates; The Finnegan Company

Original release
- Network: NBC
- Release: January 26, 1987

The Alamo: 13 Days to Glory is a 1987 American Western television film about the 1836 Battle of the Alamo, directed by Burt Kennedy and written by Clyde Ware and Norman McLeod Morrill, based on the 1958 non-fiction book 13 Days to Glory: The Siege of the Alamo by Lon Tinkle. It stars James Arness as James Bowie, Brian Keith as Davy Crockett, Alec Baldwin as William Barrett Travis, Raul Julia as Antonio López de Santa Anna, and features a cameo appearance by Lorne Greene as Sam Houston. Unlike most other films about the Alamo — the most prominent other exception being the 1955 film The Last Command (which was released during the cultural frenzy created by Walt Disney's Davy Crockett television miniseries) — it focuses on Bowie as the main character rather than Crockett.

The film aired on NBC on January 26, 1987.

== Premise ==
Against orders and no hope of relief, Texas patriots led by William Travis (Alec Baldwin), Jim Bowie (James Arness) and Davy Crockett (Brian Keith) defend the Alamo against the overwhelming Mexican forces led by the merciless General Antonio Lopez de Santa Anna (Raul Julia).

== Cast ==
- James Arness as Jim Bowie
- Brian Keith as Davy Crockett
- Alec Baldwin as Bill Travis
- Raul Julia as General Antonio López de Santa Anna
- David Ogden Stiers as Colonel Black
- Jon Lindstrom as Captain Almaron Dickinson
- Lorne Greene as Sam Houston (in his final film role)
- Jim Metzler as Major James Bonham
- Tom Schanley as Private Danny Cloud
- Fernando Allende as Colonel Alamonte, Santa Anna's Nephew
- Kathleen York as Susannah Dickinson
- Isela Vega as Senora Cos
- Gene Evans as McGregor
- Michael Wren as Juan Seguin
- Hinton Battle as Joe, Travis' Servant
- David Sheiner as Luis
- Noble Willingham as Dr. Pollard
- Eloy Casados as Gregorio
- Tony Becker as George Taylor
- Thomas Callaway as Colonel James W. Fannin
- Buck Taylor as "Colorado" Smith
- Jerry Potter as Jacob Walker
- Grainger Hines as Charles Despelier
- Tom Everett as Major Evans
- Stan Ivar as "Doc" Sutherland
- Ethan Wayne as Edward Taylor
- Jan Tríska as General Wolf
- Gary Kasper as Major Wheelwright
- John Furlong as Zanco
- Jay Baker as Hayes
- Dale Swann as Lieutenant Kimball
- Laura Fabian as Lucia
- Loyda Ramos as Senora Esparza
- Bel Sandre
- Laura Martinez Harring as Santa Anna's Bride
- Nicky Blair as John Jones
- Red West as Cockran (uncredited)

== Production ==
The production was shot at Alamo Village, the Alamo replica built by John Wayne for his lavish 1960 film The Alamo.

Much of the footage of the final battle scene was recycled from earlier films.
