= When Do We Eat? (2005 film) =

2005 American comedy film

- Film poster
- Directed by: Salvador Litvak
- Written by: Nina Davidovich; Salvador Litvak
- Produced by: Horatio C. Kemeny
- Starring: Ben Feldman; Michael Lerner; Shiri Appleby; Max Greenfield; Adam Lamberg; Cynda Williams; Jack Klugman; Lesley Ann Warren
- Cinematography: M. David Mullen
- Edited by: Richard Halsey; Ryan Kushner
- Production company: When Do We Eat? Inc.
- Distributed by: THINKFilm
- Release dates: April 14, 2005 (Palm Beach International Film Festival); April 7, 2006 (United States)
- Running time: 93 minutes
- Languages: English; Hebrew
- Box office: $431,513

When Do We Eat? is a 2005 American comedy film directed by Salvador Litvak and starring Michael Lerner, Lesley Ann Warren, Jack Klugman, Shiri Appleby, Mili Avital, Ben Feldman, and Adam Lamberg.

== Synopsis ==
When Do We Eat? is the story of a dysfunctional Jewish family's Passover Seder. This is the family's first Seder in three years and the tension is high. Before the Seder, Zeke (Ben Feldman) slips his father Ira (Michael Lerner) a pill that he believes to be a combination of ecstasy and LSD. As the night continues, the family releases secrets that cause fights but bring them closer in the end.

== Cast ==
- Ben Feldman as Zeke Stuckman, Ira and Peggy's second-youngest son and a high school student who enjoys recreational drugs.
- Michael Lerner as Ira Stuckman, the family patriarch who manufactures and distributes Christmas ornaments for a living.
  - Arman Manyan as Ira as Young Boy
  - Caleb Armstrong as Ira as a Toddler
  - Joshua Weinstein as Ira as Young Man
- Shiri Appleby as Nikki Stuckman, Ira and Peggy's daughter and a professional sex surrogate who assists men in getting over their fears of intimacy.
  - Victoria Justice as Young Nikki
- Max Greenfield as Ethan Stuckman, Ira and Peggy's eldest son who became a Hasidic Jew following his failed business ventures.
  - Kane Ritchotte as Young Ethan
- Adam Lamberg as Lionel, the youngest of the Stuckman family who is stated to have autism and a fascination with the number 7.
- Cynda Williams as Grace, Jennifer's Protestant girlfriend who is attending her first Seder.
- Jack Klugman as Artur Stuckman, Ira's father and a survivor of the Holocaust. He carries a suitcase wherever he goes in case the Nazis come and he has to run.
  - Jeremy Glazer as Young Artur
- Lesley Ann Warren as Peggy Stuckman, Ira's wife and a stay-at-home mother who raises money for autism awareness.
  - Beth Ann Warren as Young Peggy
- Meredith Scott Lynn as Jennifer Stuckman, Ira's eldest daughter from a previous marriage who types closed-captioning for a living and is estranged with her father due to her lesbian relationship.
- Mili Avital as Vanessa, a first cousin to the Stuckmans and a celebrity publicist who previously had an incestuous affair with Ethan.
- Mark Ivanir as Rafi, a one-eyed Israeli and a professional tent builder invited to the Seder.

== Critical reception ==
On the review aggregator website Rotten Tomatoes, 42% of 38 critics' reviews are positive, with an average rating of 4.9/10. The website's consensus reads: "A crass, sitcom-ish holiday comedy, When Do We Eat? presents all the over-the-top dysfunctional family hijinks one would expect from the genre."

== Awards and nominations ==
- deadCENTER Film Festival in Oklahoma City: Winner - Best Narrative Feature
- Napa/Sonoma Wine Country Film Festival: Winner - Best Comedy
- Reno Tahoe International Film Festival: Best Pick and Winner - Best Director
- San Diego Film Festival: Winner - Best Screenplay (Nina Davidovich & Salvador Litvak)
