= David Ren =

Chinese-American filmmaker (born 1986)

- Born: Yi Ren; November 5, 1986 (age 39); Shanghai, China
- Education: University of Redlands
- Occupations: Director, writer, producer
- Spouse: Athena Hu (m. 2005)
- Children: 2

David Ren (born Yi Ren; November 5, 1986) is a Chinese-American film co-director, writer, and producer.

== Biography ==
David Ren was born in Shanghai, China, and grew up in Queens, New York City. He started to study acting at the Neighborhood Playhouse at the age of nine. He attended the Bronx High School of Science, Professional Children's School, and the University of Redlands. He moved to Los Angeles in 2003 to pursue a filmmaking career. He married Athena Hu in 2005. They have two children together.

== Career ==
Ren wrote and co-directed his first feature film in 2007, Shanghai Kiss with co-director Kern Konwiser. The film stars Ken Leung, Hayden Panettiere, Kelly Hu and Joel David Moore. It won awards at the San Francisco International Asian American Film Festival, Newport Beach Film Festival and was bestowed a Gold Angel Award at the Chinese American Film Festival.

Ren's second feature is an action noir titled The Girl from the Naked Eye, released in 2012.
