= Dreamkiller (film) =

2010 American film

- Film theatrical poster
- Directed by: Catherine Pirotta
- Screenplay by: Catherine Pirotta; Clyde Ware
- Produced by: Stephane Mermet; Clyde Ware
- Starring: Dario Deak; John Colton; Penny Drake
- Cinematography: John O'Shaugnessy
- Music by: Marcus Sjowall
- Production company: Delaware Pictures
- Release date: February 19, 2010
- Running time: 103 minutes
- Country: United States
- Language: English

Dreamkiller is a 2010 psychological thriller directed by Catherine Pirotta and starring Dario Deak and John Colton, who portray a scientific team of two doctors who embark on a research project to cure fear-ridden, phobic patients of all varieties.

== Plot summary ==
A revolutionary form of psychotherapy designed to rid patients of their phobias yields deadly results when test-subjects begin dying in the same manner as their worst fears. When the Nazis were at the height of power, Adolf Hitler began working with doctors Carl Clauberg and Joseph Mengele to develop a weapon capable of inducing psychosis in enemy combatants. In 1945, Hitler's concentration camps were liberated, and Allied forces were said to have confiscated and destroyed all evidence of the experiments. Flash forward to the new millennium, when some of the most respected doctors on the planet unveil their latest project - the F.R.I.T. program. Though the doctors are confident that the F.R.I.T. program can help patients to conquer their greatest fears, the public isn't convinced. Their skepticism is confirmed when the test subjects begin perishing under mysterious circumstances. Someone - or something - is preying on their deepest, darkest fears, and now the race is on to save the rest of the patients before it's too late.

== Cast ==
- Dario Deak as Nick Nemet
- John Colton as Dr. Marvin Stalberg
- Penny Drake as Detective Annette Defour
- John Savage as Agent Barnes
- Tyrone Power Jr. as Agent Benett
- Diandra Newlin as Natalia Nemet

== Production ==
Dreamkiller was written by director Catherine Pirotta and veteran screenwriter Clyde Ware and produced by Delaware Pictures out of Raleigh Studios. The director described the film: "Fear is something everyone can relate to. I wanted to touch on fears that aren’t always talked about, like the fear of falling in love or rejection." "The theme of the film is fear. It limits us and stops us from doing things and fear kills our dreams. In the film, a group of patients with regular fears are being treated and their deaths begin to mirror what they fear. In life, if we don’t take control of our fears, it takes control of ourselves. You can control people and nations with fear."

== Music ==
The music for Dreamkiller was scored by Swedish Composer Marcus Sjowall with additional songs by Mike Pelavin and Dario Deak, Diandra Newlin and theme song "Dreamkiller" by Film/TV Composer Patrick Bowsher. As part of the promotion for the movie, a number of concerts were booked around Los Angeles featuring songs from the “Dreamkiller” soundtrack as played by The Ramp and featuring Dreamkiller’s lead actor Dario Deak singing. A concert after party took place at the Whisky a Go Go on 3 April 2010.

== Marketing ==
Delaware Pictures launched a marketing campaign for the film, titled "What Do U Fear?," posing this central question to many an ordinary citizen, with many a forthcoming response. "Every one of us has a whole list of fears, and it was interesting how many people were actually happy and willing to talk about them," Deak said. This responsiveness was encouraging to Deak and Pirotta, who see bravery not as an absence of fear but as an acknowledgment and confrontation of it. One of the main goals of the Dreamkiller campaign is to spread a feeling of normalcy, to reassure viewers that their fears do not place them in a minority. A potential partnership with UCLA’s Counseling Center fell through, but Pirotta and Deak pursued connections with other psychological services offices nationwide, as well as celebrities and well-known figures. "When you hear celebrities talking about their fears, you feel a little more normal," Pirotta said. "There are no shortcuts in life – that’s one of the messages in the movie – sometimes you just have to be strong and get up every time you fall, and at the end the only way to defeat fear is to be brave," Pirotta said.

Among the fears used in a part of the same marketing campaign, a video titled Don't fear black cats featuring the lead actor of the movie Dario Deak with his self-rescued black cat "Penelope", was launched with a mission to bring awareness to human fears based on superstitious beliefs and stereotypes.

== Release ==
The film premiered on February 17, 2010 at the Arclight Cinemas in Hollywood.

The film went into a limited release on February 19, 2010, playing for 14 weeks in Los Angeles before beginning to expand in July 2010.

== Reception ==
The review in LA Weekly called the film "utter boredom", while Variety called it "amateurish". LaDale Anderson of Canyon News wrote, "A new independent film that is being compared to “The Blair Witch Project,” is taking the Los Angeles region by storm". Anderson reported that Pirotta talked about a possible TV series adaptation of the film, but nothing has developed.
