= Max Greenfield =

American actor (born 1979)

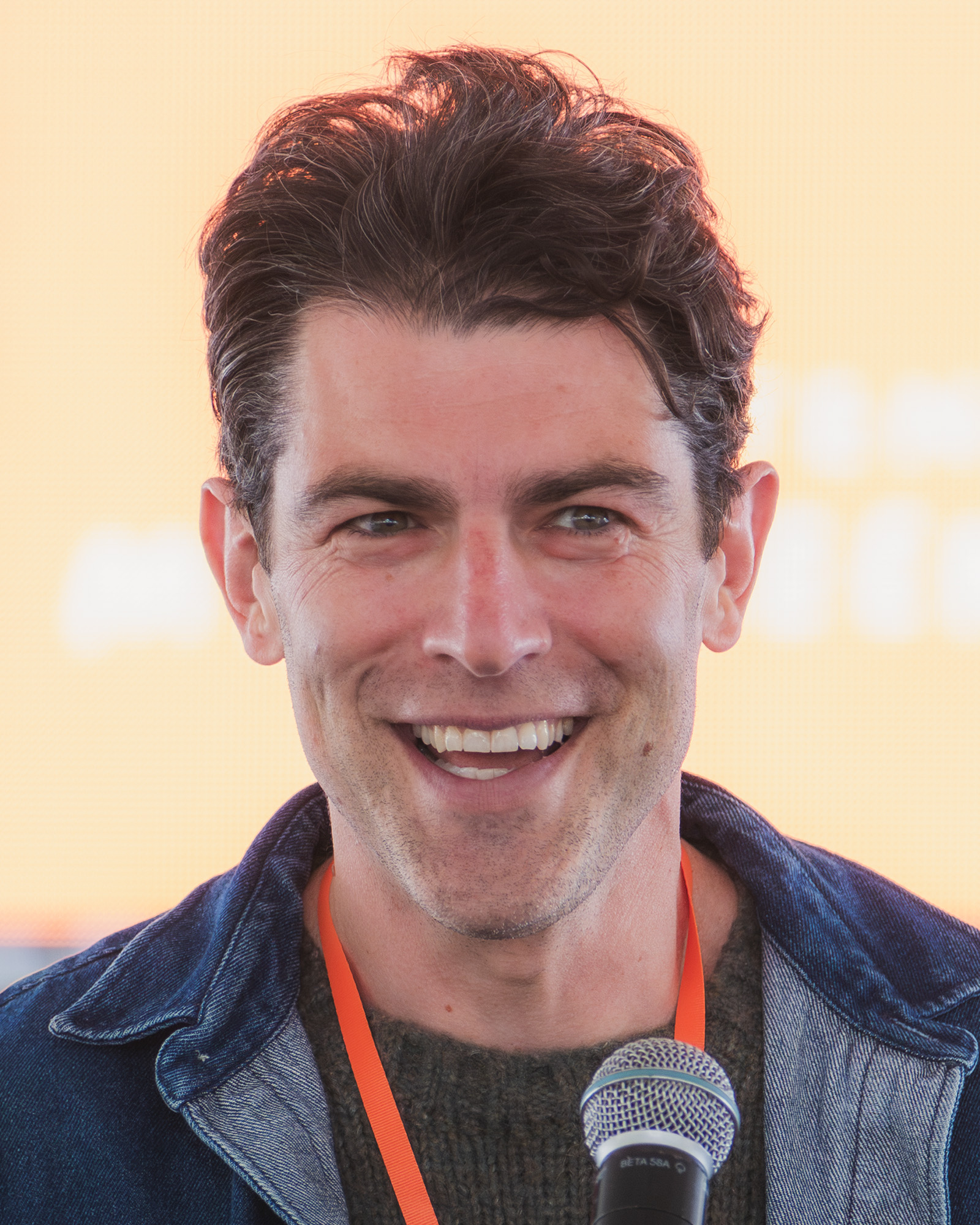
- Greenfield in 2025
- Born: September 4, 1979 (age 47); Dobbs Ferry, New York, U.S.
- Occupation: Actor
- Years active: 1998–present
- Spouse: Tess Sanchez (m. 2008)
- Children: 2

Max Greenfield (born September 4, 1979) is an American actor and author. He co-starred as Schmidt in the Fox sitcom New Girl, for which he received nominations at the Primetime Emmy Awards, the Golden Globe Awards, and the Critics' Choice Television Awards. From 2018 to 2026, Greenfield portrayed Dave Johnson in the CBS sitcom The Neighborhood. He appeared in recurring roles in Veronica Mars and Ugly Betty.

He voiced Roger in the Ice Age franchise, and numerous characters in the shows Bob's Burgers, Robot Chicken and BoJack Horseman. He has also written the children's books I Don't Want to Read This Book, I Don't Want to Read This Book Aloud, This Book is Not a Present and Good Night Thoughts.

== Early life and education ==
Greenfield was born and raised in Dobbs Ferry, New York. He is Jewish and had a Saturday Night Live-themed Bar Mitzvah. He graduated from Dobbs Ferry High School in 1998. At DFHS, Greenfield played wide receiver for the football team.

== Career ==
Greenfield began pursuing an acting career in 1995 after he graduated from high school. He briefly attended college at the University of Wisconsin, but dropped out after earning a 1.0 GPA his freshman year. He landed guest appearances on dramas such as Boston Public, Gilmore Girls and The O.C. Greenfield scored his first lead role on the short-lived series Modern Men as one of three bachelors who hire a life coach to help them understand women. Greenfield had more success in supporting roles on Veronica Mars (reprising the role in the film adaptation in 2014) and Greek. In 2007, he landed a recurring role on Ugly Betty. He made other guest-starring appearances on the remake of Melrose Place, the short-lived No Ordinary Family, and Castle.

He created, produced, and starred in the comedy series The Gentlemen's League for the Audience Network in 2010, which followed the real-life fantasy football league he ran with actor Jerry Ferrara. Greenfield had his feature film debut in the film Cross Bronx. Greenfield had a featured role in When Do We Eat?, as an Internet tycoon who, after losing his fortune, becomes a Hasidic Jew. In 2011, Greenfield began playing the role of Schmidt in the sitcom New Girl. The role earned him nominations for both a Primetime Emmy Award for Outstanding Supporting Actor in a Comedy Series and a Golden Globe Award for Best Supporting Actor – Series, Miniseries or Television Film.

In 2015, Greenfield starred in a series of McDonald's commercials promoting their Sirloin Third Pound Burgers.

In 2018, Greenfield was cast in the lead role of Dave Johnson in the CBS comedy The Neighborhood. He took over the role from Josh Lawson, who played the character in the pilot episode. On November 8, 2018, it was announced that Greenfield was set to reprise his role as Leo D'Amato in the 8-episode revival series of Veronica Mars. In the same year, Greenfield was cast in the recurring role of the Denouement brothers on the third season of the Netflix comedy drama series A Series of Unfortunate Events.

== Philanthropy ==
Greenfield has worked with Young Storytellers Foundation on numerous occasions, stating that his own kids have inspired him to help children find self-confidence and creativity.

== Personal life ==
Greenfield married Tess Sanchez, a former casting director, in 2008. They have two children, a daughter and a son.

== Filmography ==
Key
†	Denotes films that have not yet been released

=== Film ===
Film
Year	Title	Role	Notes
2004	Cross Bronx	Ike Green	
2005	When Do We Eat?	Ethan	
2014	They Came Together	Jake	
2014	Veronica Mars	Leo D'Amato	
2014	About Alex	Josh	
2015	Hello, My Name Is Doris	John Fremont	
2015	The Big Short	Mortgage Broker	
2016	Ice Age: Collision Course	Roger (voice)	
2017	Fist Fight	—N/a	Story writer and producer
2017	Shot Caller	Tom	
2017	The Glass Castle	David	
2017	I'm Not Here	Dad	
2018	A Futile and Stupid Gesture	Chris Miller	
2018	The Oath	Dan Moore	
2019	What Men Want	Kevin Myrtle	
2020	Promising Young Woman	Joe Macklemore III	
2020	Cats & Dogs 3: Paws Unite!	Roger (voice)	
2022	The Valet	Vincent Royce	
2023	First Time Female Director	Robbie	
2024	Unfrosted	Rick Ludwin	
2026	Don't Say Good Luck	Ted Birenbaum	
2026	Let's Have Kids!	Brian	

=== Television ===
Television
Year	Title	Role	Notes
2000	Undressed	Victor	3 episodes
2002	Boston Public	Sean Tallen	Episode: "Chapter Thirty-Five"
2003	Gilmore Girls	Lucas	Episode: "Chicken or Beef?"
2005–2007, 2019	Veronica Mars	Leo D'Amato	14 episodes
2005	Sleeper Cell	Teen #2	Episode: "Al-Faitha"
2006	Modern Men	Kyle Brewster	Main cast; 7 episodes
2007	The O.C.	Young Sandy Cohen	Episode: "The Case of the Franks"
2007–2008	Ugly Betty	Nick Pepper	8 episodes
2007	Life	Bradley Sloane	Episode: "Tear Asunder"
2008	Greek	Michael	5 episodes
2008	Kath & Kim	Bar fight guy	Episode: "Gay"
2009	Raising the Bar	David Steinberg	4 episodes
2009	Melrose Place	Mickey Richards	Episode: "Cannon"
2010	Castle	David Nicolaides	Episode: "Food to Die For"
2010	Lie to Me	Damien Musso	Episode: "The Whole Truth"
2010	No Ordinary Family	Mr. Robbins	Episode: "No Ordinary Quake"
2010–2011	The Gentlemen's League	Max	2 episodes
2010	The Whole Truth	Joseph Tucci	Episode: "Cold Case"
2010	Undercovers	Redman	Uncredited; Episode: "The Key to It All"
2011	Hot in Cleveland	Steve	Episode: "I Love Lucci, Part 1"
2011	Happy Endings	Ian	Episode: "You've Got Male"
2011–2018	New Girl	Schmidt	Main cast; 146 episodes Nominated – Critics' Choice Television Award for Best Supporting Actor in a Comedy Series (2012, 2013); Nominated – Golden Globe Award for Best Supporting Actor – Series, Miniseries or Television Film; Nominated – Primetime Emmy Award for Outstanding Supporting Actor in a Comedy Series; Nominated – Teen Choice Award for Choice TV Scene Stealer – Male
2012	NTSF:SD:SUV::	Alistair McQueen	Episode: "Lights, Camera, Assassination"
2013–2020	Bob's Burgers	Boo Boo	Voice, 5 episodes
2014	Hot in Cleveland	Doug	Episode: "The One with George Clooney"
2014	Robot Chicken	Bobby, LaserTech, Tuk	Voice, episode: "Super Guitario Center"
2014–2015	The Mindy Project	Lee	2 episodes
2015	American Horror Story: Hotel	Gabriel	3 episodes
2017	All Hail King Julien	Kipper	Voice, 2 episodes
2017	Will & Grace	Eli Wolf	Episode: "How to Succeed in Business Without Really Crying"
2018	The Assassination of Gianni Versace: American Crime Story	Ronnie	Recurring role; 3 episodes
2018–2026	The Neighborhood	Dave Johnson	Main role
2018	No Activity	Cotric	2 episodes
2019	A Series of Unfortunate Events	Dewey, Frank, and Ernest Denouement	Episode: "Penultimate Peril"
2019	BoJack Horseman	Maximillian Banks	Voice, 3 episodes
2020	Hoops	Lonnie	Voice, 2 episodes
2021	Doogie Kameāloha, M.D.	Dr. Arthur Goldstein	Episode: "Mom-Mentum"
2021–2022	Tuca & Bertie	Thomas	Voice, 2 episodes
2022	American Horror Stories	Bryce	Episode: "Aura"
2025	Celebrity Jeopardy!	Himself (contestant)	Episode: "Quarterfinal #1: Max Greenfield, Camilla Luddington, and W. Kamau Bell"
2025–2026	Running Point	Lev Levenson	12 episodes
2025	The Simpsons	Schultz	Voice, episode: "Estranger Things"
2025	Long Story Short	Yoshi Schwooper	Voice; Main cast
2025	A Man on the Inside	Jack Berenger	Recurring; 5 episodes

=== Audio ===
Audio
Year	Title	Role	Notes
2023	Flash: Escape the Midnight Circus	Barry Allen / Flash	Main role
