= Clyde Ware =

American screenwriter, director, and producer

Clyde Coster Ware, Jr (December 22, 1930 – August 30, 2010) was an American television and film screenwriter, director, and producer, best known for his teleplays for The Spy with My Face (1965), Gunsmoke (1965–67) and Coward of the County (1981).

== Biography ==
Born in Clarksburg and raised in West Union — both in north-central West Virginia — Ware arrived in Hollywood in 1961 after several years working as an actor in New York City. In the early 1970s, he formed his own independent film production company — Jud-Lee Productions, named after his two children. Ware returned to his native state to film two feature films — No Drums, No Bugles (1972), filmed in Tyler and Doddridge Counties, and When the Line Goes Through (1973), filmed in West Union. (Both starred a young and relatively unknown Martin Sheen.)

Ware produced two novels. The second — The Eden Tree (1971) — was a roman à clef about his family and youth in West Virginia which scandalized his hometown upon publication.

== Death ==
He died of cancer in Los Angeles on August 30, 2010.

== Filmography ==
=== Writer ===
- The Great Adventure
  - "A Boy at War" (1963)
- The Man from U.N.C.L.E.
  - "The Double Affair" (1964)
- Rawhide
  - "The Photographer" (1964)
  - "Piney" (1964)
- The Alfred Hitchcock Hour
  - "Final Performance" (1965)
- The Spy with My Face (1965)
- The Road West
  - "Piece of Tin" (1966)
- The Iron Men (1966)
- Daniel Boone
  - "The Mound Builders" (1965)
  - "Delo Jones" (1967)
- The Invaders (1967)
  - "Quantity: Unknown" (1967)
- The Guns of Will Sonnett
  - "Meeting at Devil's For" (1967)
- Gunsmoke
  - "Major Glory" (1967)
  - "Cattle Barons" (1967)
  - "Ladies from St. Louis" (1967)
  - "Noose of Gold" (1967)
  - "The Lure" (1967)
  - "Old Friend" (1967)
  - "Saturday Night" (1967)
  - "The Wrong Man" (1966)
  - "The Goldtakers" (1966)
  - "Treasure of John Walking Fox" (1966)
  - "The Raid: Part 2" (1966)
  - "The Raid: Part 1" (1966)
  - "Outlaw's Woman" (1965)
  - "The Hostage" (1965)
  - "Seven Hours to Dawn" (1965)
  - "Twenty Miles from Dodge" (1965)
  - "Chief Joseph" (1965)
- Catalina Caper (1967)
- The Silent Gun (1969)
- Bracken's World
  - "Love It or Leave It, Change It or Lose It" (1970)
- The High Chaparral
  - "Wind" (1970)
  - "A Man to Match the Land" (1971)
- Cade's County
  - "Gray Wolf" (1971)
- No Drums, No Bugles (1972)
- When the Line Goes Through (1973)
- ABC Afterschool Specials
  - "Runaways" (1974)
- The Story of Pretty Boy Floyd (1974)
- All the Kind Strangers (1974)
- The Hatfields and the McCoys (1975)
- The Last Convertible (1979)
- Knots Landing
  - "Land of the Free" (1980)
- Coward of the County (1981)
- Sizzle (1981)
- Airwolf
  - "Proof Through the Night" (1984)
- Whiz Kids
  - "The Sufi Project" (1984)
- The Alamo: Thirteen Days to Glory (1987)
- Human Error (1988)
- Dynasty
  - "Ginger Snaps" (1989)
- Bad Jim (1990)
- Another Time, Another Place (1992)
- Mary-8 (2009)
- Dreamkiller (2010)

=== Director ===
- No Drums, No Bugles (1972)
- When the Line Goes Through (1973)
- The Story of Pretty Boy Floyd (1974)
- The Hatfields and the McCoys (1975)
- 300 Miles for Stephanie (1981)
- Human Error (1988)
- Bad Jim (1990)
- Another Time, Another Place (1992)

=== Producer ===
- No Drums, No Bugles (1972)
- When the Line Goes Through (1973)
- Airwolf (1984)
  - "Proof Through the Night" (1984)
  - "Bite of the Jackal" (1984)
  - "Daddy's Gone a Hunt'n" (1984)
- Bad Jim (1990)
- Another Time, Another Place (1992)
- Dreamkiller (2010; executive producer)

=== Consultant ===
- Bonanza (1972)
  - "Riot" (1972), executive story consultant
  - "The Initiation" (1972), executive story consultant
- Back to Freedom (1988), script consultant

== Bibliography ==
=== Novels ===
- The Innocents (1969)
- The Eden Tree (1971)
