= 1864 in archaeology =

List of years in archaeology	(table)
- … 1854; 1855; 1856; 1857; 1858; 1859; 1860; 1861; 1862; 1863; 1864; 1865; 1866; 1867; 1868; 1869; 1870; 1871; 1872; 1873; 1874 …
- In science 1861 1862 1863 1864 1865 1866 1867
- Art; Archaeology; Architecture; Literature; Music; Philosophy; Science; +...

Below are notable events in archaeology that occurred in 1864.

== Excavations ==
- March – Danes Graves, Arras culture barrows in the East Riding of Yorkshire, England, by Canon William Greenwell.

== Finds ==
- A carving on mammoth ivory of a woolly mammoth is found by Édouard Lartet in Abri de la Madeleine cave in France, the first widely accepted evidence for the coexistence of humans with extinct prehistoric animals and the first contemporary depiction of such a creature known to modern science.
- Approximate date - Vénus impudique, the first Paleolithic sculptural representation of a woman discovered in modern times, is found by Paul Hurault, 8th Marquis de Vibraye, at Laugerie-Basse, one of the Prehistoric Sites and Decorated Caves of the Vézère Valley in southwestern France.

== Publications ==
- John Evans – The Coins of the Ancient Britons
- William Collings Lukis – "Danish Cromlechs and Burial Customs compared with those of Brittany, the Channel Islands, and Great Britain". The Wiltshire Archaeological and Natural History Magazine 8: pp. 145–69.
- Henry Christy publishes the first results of his joint explorations with Édouard Lartet of caves in the valley of the Vézère, in southern France.
- Édouard Lartet – Revue archéologique.

== Births ==
- July 14 – Auguste Audollent, French historian, archaeologist and Latin epigrapher (d. 1943)
