= 1865 in archaeology =

List of years in archaeology	(table)
- … 1855; 1856; 1857; 1858; 1859; 1860; 1861; 1862; 1863; 1864; 1865; 1866; 1867; 1868; 1869; 1870; 1871; 1872; 1873; 1874; 1875 …
- In science 1862 1863 1864 1865 1866 1867 1868
- Art; Archaeology; Architecture; Literature; Music; Philosophy; Science; +...

Below are notable events in archaeology that occurred in 1865.

== Explorations ==
- The first report of a discovery of Coţofeni culture at Râpa Roșie in Romania is made by Fr. W. Schuster.

== Excavations ==
- Excavations at Slack Roman fort in Yorkshire (England) under the direction of George Lloyd.

== Publications ==
- Joseph Barnard Davis and John Thurnam complete publication of Crania Britannica: delineations and descriptions of the skulls of the aboriginal and early inhabitants of the British islands.
- John Lubbock publishes Pre-historic Times, as Illustrated by Ancient Remains, and the Manners and Customs of Modern Savages, including his coinage of the term Palæolithic.
- Joseph-Alexander Martigny publishes Dictionnaire des antiquités chrétiennes.
- Edward Burnett Tylor publishes Researches into the Early History of Mankind and the Development of Civilization.

== Finds ==
- French archeologist Auguste Mariette discovers Ti watching a hippopotamus hunt, tomb of Ti, Saqqara, Fifth dynasty of Egypt. It is made c. 2510 BC - 2460 BC.

== Events ==
- Churchill Babington elected to the Disney Professorship of Archaeology in the University of Cambridge.
- Palestine Exploration Fund is established.

== Births ==
- June 22 - Friedrich Sarre, German Orientalist (d. 1945)
- August 27 - James Henry Breasted, American Egyptologist (d. 1935)
- Alfred Foucher, French scholar and archaeologist of Buddhism (d. 1952)

== Deaths ==
- May 4: Henry Christy, English ethnologist, archaeologist and sponsor (born 1810).
- May 21 - Christian Jürgensen Thomsen, Danish archaeologist (born 1788).

== See also ==
- Ancient Egypt / Egyptology
