= 1867 in archaeology =

List of years in archaeology	(table)
- … 1857; 1858; 1859; 1860; 1861; 1862; 1863; 1864; 1865; 1866; 1867; 1868; 1869; 1870; 1871; 1872; 1873; 1874; 1875; 1876; 1877 …
- Art; Archaeology; Architecture; Literature; Music; Philosophy; Science; +...

Below are notable events in archaeology that occurred in 1867.

== Explorations ==
- Ruins of Great Zimbabwe rediscovered by Adam Renders.

== Excavations ==
- Oluf Rygh excavates the Tune ship in Norway.
- Excavations at Bibracte begun by Gabriel Bulliot (continue to 1907).
- September - Augustus Henry Lane-Fox undertakes his first excavation, at Cissbury Ring hill fort in West Sussex.

== Finds ==
- George Smith discovers an inscription recording a solar eclipse in the month of Sivan on British Museum Tablet K51, which he is able to link to 15 June 763 BC, the cornerstone of ancient Near Eastern chronology.
- The (full) Speyer wine bottle is found in the excavation of a mid-4th century Roman tomb near Speyer in Germany.
- The Stele of Vespasian is found in Armazi, Georgia.

== Events ==
- National Archaeological Museum of Spain is established in Madrid by Royal Decree of Isabella II.

== Births ==
- 13 May - Thomas Gann, Anglo Irish explorer and archaeologist of the Maya civilization (d. 1938)
- 27 August - Alfred Lucas, English analytical chemist and archaeologist, part of Howard Carter's team at the excavation of Tutankhamun's tomb (d. 1945)

== Deaths ==
- August 3 - August Böckh, German classical scholar and antiquarian (b. 1785)

== See also ==
- List of years in archaeology
- 1866 in archaeology
- 1868 in archaeology
