= 1854 in archaeology =

Below are notable events in archaeology that occurred in 1854.

== Explorations ==
- Giovanni Battista de Rossi discovers the Catacomb of Callixtus in Rome.
- Karl von Scherzer examines and writes a description of Quiriguá, a Maya site in Guatemala.
- Thomas Wright investigates Kit's Coty House, the remains of a Neolithic chambered long barrow in Kent, England.

== Finds ==
- Coleraine Hoard in the north of Ireland.
- Dalton Parlours Roman villa in Yorkshire, England.

== Births ==
- August 26 - Kate Bradbury Griffith, English Egyptologist (d. 1902)

== Deaths ==
- September 27 - Frederick Catherwood (b. 1799)

== See also ==
- List of years in archaeology
- 1853 in archaeology
- 1855 in archaeology
