= 1780s in archaeology =

The decade of the 1780s in archaeology involved some significant events.

== Explorations ==
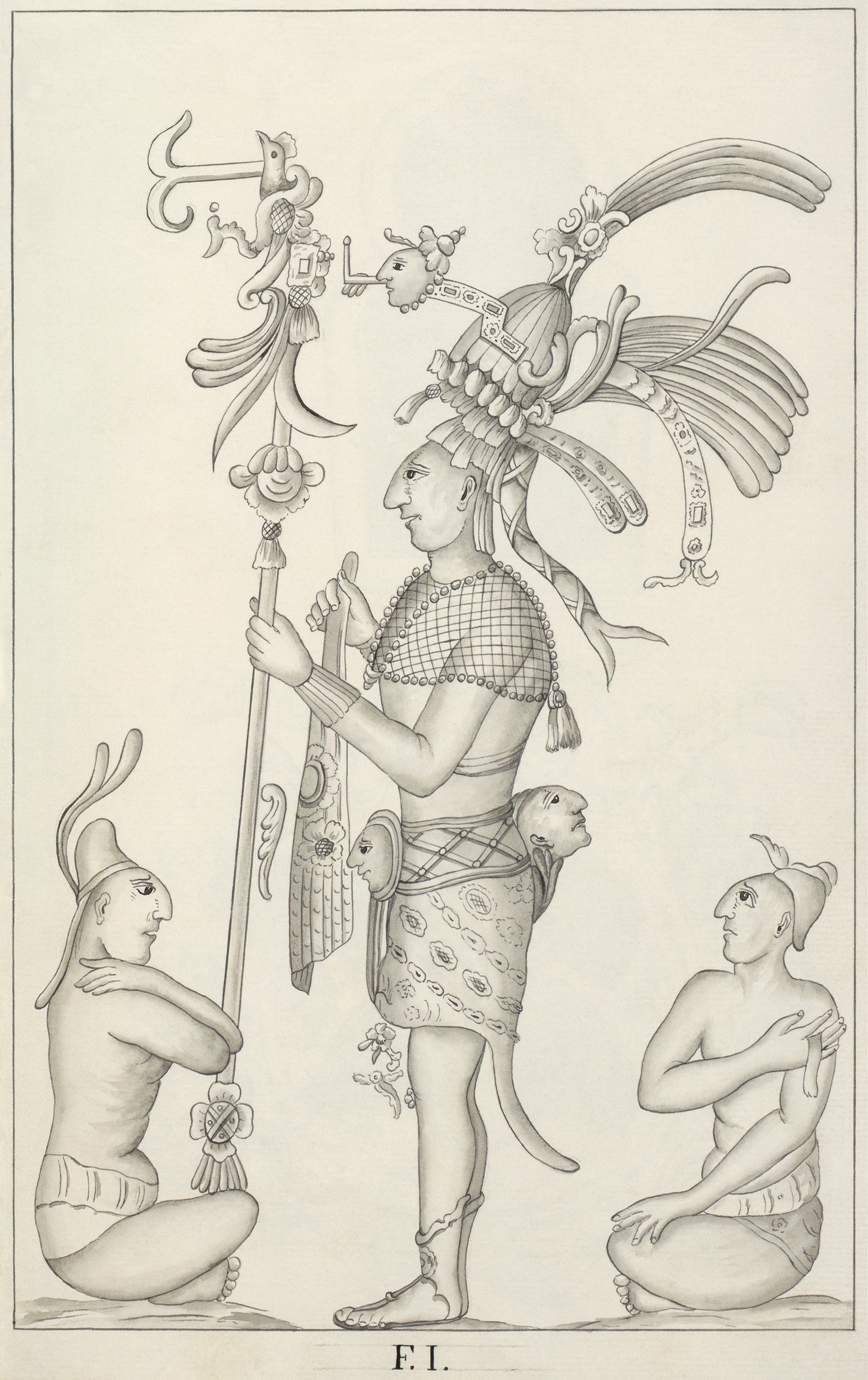
Detail of a relief from a Mayan ruin at Palenque drawn by Ricardo Almendáriz at the time of its original excavation in 1787

- 1786: Antonio Bernasconi and Colonel Antonio del Rio examine the ruins of Palenque, making the first map of the site and some crude excavations.

== Excavations ==
- 1786: Excavation of a Roman villa near Warminster in England by antiquarian Catherine Downes.
- 1788
  - Excavations of Roman city of Viroconium Cornoviorum (Wroxeter) in England by civil engineer Thomas Telford.
  - Desecration of royal and ecclesiastical graves at the site of Hyde Abbey (near Winchester) in England by convict labour.
- Formal excavations continue at Pompeii.

== Finds ==
- 1780
  - Tomb of the Scipios rediscovered in Rome.
  - Discobolus Palombara discovered in Rome.
- 1781: Roman coin hoards found in England near Eye, Suffolk (approximate date) and Stanmore, near London.
- 1782: Tomb of Katherine Parr (d. 1548) rediscovered in Sudeley Castle, England.
- 1786: Gold thumb ring of Senicianus discovered near Calleva Atrebatum (Silchester) in England.
- 1789: The Stony Stratford Hoard uncovered in England.
- Xagħra Stone Circle first discovered in Malta.

== Publications ==
- 1785: Engineer Diego Ruiz visits and publishes the first account of El Tajín.
- 1789: Saggio di lingua Etrusca by Luigi Lanzi.

== Other events ==
- 1780: December 18 – The Society of Antiquaries of Scotland is formed.
- 1783: The Society of Antiquaries of Scotland is incorporated.

== Births ==
- 1784: July 25 – Richard William Howard Vyse, English soldier, anthropologist and Egyptologist (d. 1853).
- 1785: November 24 – August Böckh, German classical scholar and antiquarian (d. 1867).
- 1786: December 11 – William John Bankes, English Member of Parliament, explorer and Egyptologist (d. 1855).
- 1787: March 28 – Claudius James Rich, English traveller and scholar (d. 1820).
- 1788: September 10 – Jacques Boucher de Crèvecœur de Perthes, French archaeologist (d. 1868)
- 1788: December 29 – Christian Jürgensen Thomsen, Danish archaeologist (d. 1865).

== Deaths ==
- 1780: March 14 – Roque Joaquín de Alcubierre, Spanish-born military engineer and pioneer Classical archaeologist (b. 1702)
- 1788: February 2 – James "Athenian" Stuart, Scottish architect and archaeologist (b. 1713)

Preceded by 1770s in archaeology	Archaeology timeline 1780s	Succeeded by 1790s in archaeology
