= 1863 in archaeology =

- 1780s ^{.} 1790s in archaeology ^{.} 1800
- Other events: 1790s ^{.} Archaeology timeline

Below are notable events in archaeology that occurred in 1863.

== Explorations ==
- Édouard Lartet and Henry Christy begin joint exploration of caves in the valley of the Vézère, in southern France.

== Excavations ==
- Excavations at Ephesus by John Turtle Wood begin.
- William Copeland Borlase supervises excavations of the re-discovered prehistoric settlement and fogou at Carn Euny in Cornwall.

== Publications ==
- Samuel Ferguson's Ogham Inscriptions in Ireland, Wales and Scotland is published posthumously.
- The text of the Iguvine Tablets (3rd–1st centuries BC) is first published, by Francis William Newman in London.
- Zeitschrift für ägyptisches Sprache und Altertumskunde begins publication.

== Finds ==
- April 13 – The Winged Victory of Samothrace (a representation of Nike) is found in excavations on the Greek island of Samothrace by Charles Champoiseau. Made c.190 BCE, it is shipped to the Louvre in Paris.
- April 20 – The Augustus of Prima Porta is found in excavations in the Villa of Livia at Prima Porta, near Rome.
- Nydam Boats found in Denmark by Conrad Engelhardt.
- The Colmar Treasure, a hoard of 14th century Jewish precious metal objects, is discovered in Alsace.
- Early human jawbone found in proximity to flint tools at Moulin Quignon in France by Jacques Boucher de Crèvecœur de Perthes, subsequently considered a hoax perpetrated by one of his diggers.

== Miscellaneous ==
- Anthropological Society of London formed

== Births ==
- July 4 – Hugo Winckler, German Assyriologist (died 1913)
- July 13 – Margaret Murray, Anglo-Indian Egyptologist (died 1963)
- Francis Joseph Bigger, Irish antiquarian (died 1926)

== Deaths ==
- July 3 – Alexander Henry Rhind, Scottish Egyptologist (born 1833)
- November 4 [O.S. October 23] – Kyriakos Pittakis, Greek archaeologist (born c. 1798)

== See also ==
- List of years in archaeology
- 1862 in archaeology
- 1864 in archaeology
