= Broken noses in ancient Egyptian statues =

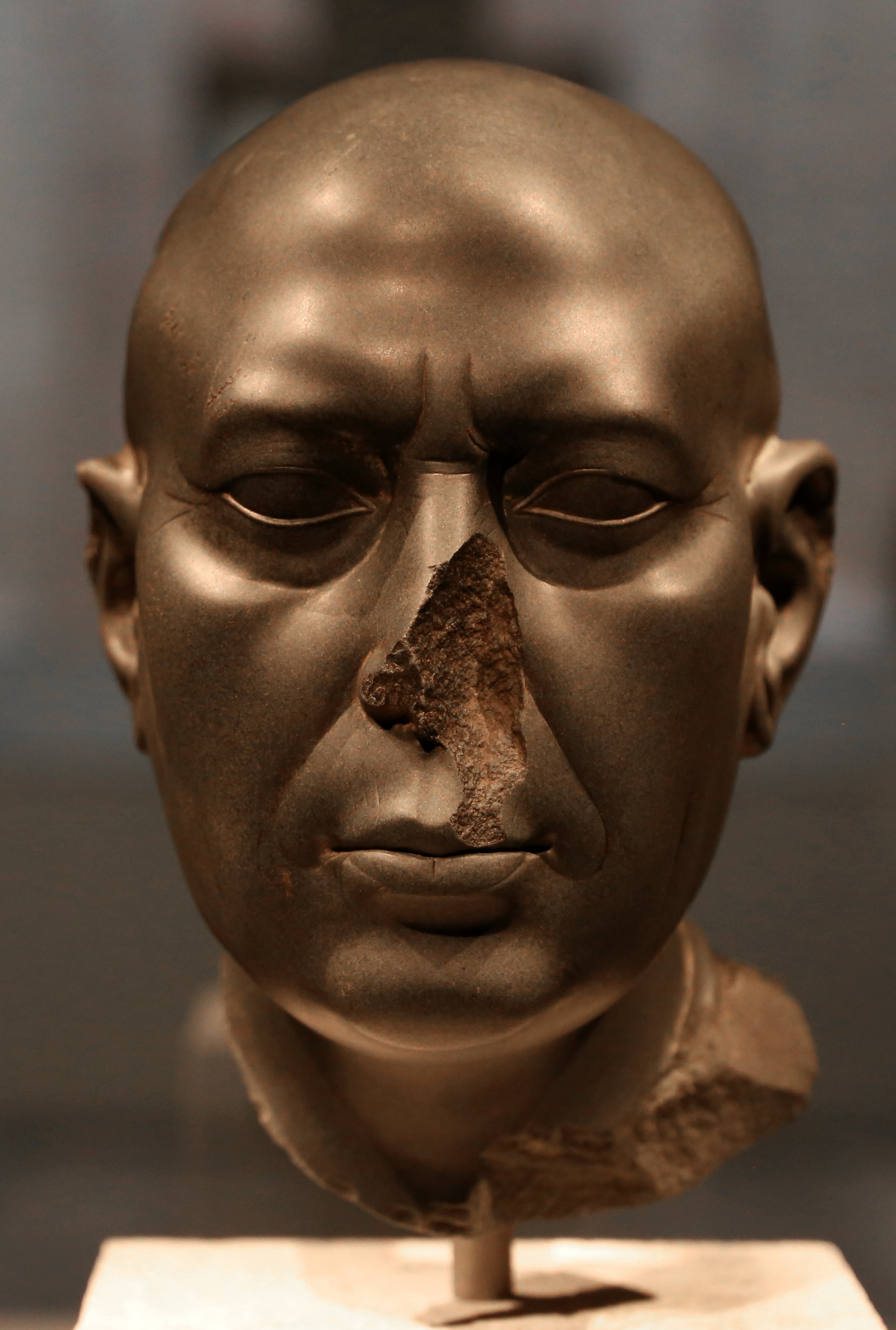
Berlin Green Head-Ancient Egyptian statues in the Ägyptisches Museum Berlin

The phenomenon of Ancient Egyptian statues with broken noses is widespread among many Ancient Egyptian statues, especially stone ones. The causes of these fractures are often attributed to natural factors such as erosion and deterioration over time, or the result of deliberate human actions linked to religious beliefs. This phenomenon has caused controversy, and ideologies have attempted to use it to support extreme ideas about Ancient Egyptian history.

== History ==
=== Ancient Egypt ===
The prevailing practice of destroying images of the human form dates back to the beginnings of Egyptian history. Hieroglyphic instructions were given to warriors about to enter battle: Make a wax statue of the enemy, then destroy it as described in a series of ancient Egyptian texts. Concerned about the destruction of their image, the pharaohs regularly issued decrees imposing terrible punishments on anyone who dared to threaten their image.

First Intermediate Period (c. 2130–1980 BC) A royal decree issued by the pharaoh on behalf of his minister expressed concern about the potential damage that could be done to statues placed by individuals in the temple. The text of the decree read:

And whoever does harm or evil to your statues throughout this land, or offers tablets, shrines, wooden works, or relics found in any temple sanctuary or in any temples, His Majesty will not allow their possessions or the possessions of their fathers to remain with them, nor shall they join the spirits in the cemetery, nor shall they remain among the living.

==== Religious reasons ====
In ancient Egyptian belief, a statue was not merely a visual representation, but a physical body capable of embodying vital and spiritual forces, most notably the ka and the ba, making it an active entity in both the earthly and the afterlife worlds. According to this conception, the nose was seen as the organ associated with breathing, and therefore with life itself.

Therefore, breaking the nose was not a random act, but a symbolic means of disrupting the statue's vital capacity and preventing it from performing its existential function, whether as the seat of divine power or as a substitute body for the deceased.

Statues associated with real people, whether living or deceased, were also defaced in order to harm them. Funerary statues were also defaced, as they played a specific ritual role in offering or receiving offerings on behalf of the statue's owner. In this context, the limbs, especially the arms, acquired clear symbolic and practical significance within the religious system because they were used to offer and receive offerings. Breaking the left arm was intended to prevent the statue from offering the offering, and breaking the right arm was intended to prevent the statue from receiving the offering.

This was a firmly held belief among the ancient Egyptians, who also devised various methods to prevent the statue from breathing, such as burning incense under the statue's nostrils to prevent the spirit inside it from breathing and thus living.

The ancient Egyptians believed that the original intention of the god Ptah when he created sculptures of other gods: according to a document from the 25th dynasty (around 1500 BC). 746–653 BC), the god "Ptah begot the gods and made their bodies according to their wishes, and thus the gods entered their bodies, from every kind of wood, every kind of stone, and every kind of clay".

However, the Egyptians did not believe that stone statues could move or literally breathe.

==== Political reasons ====
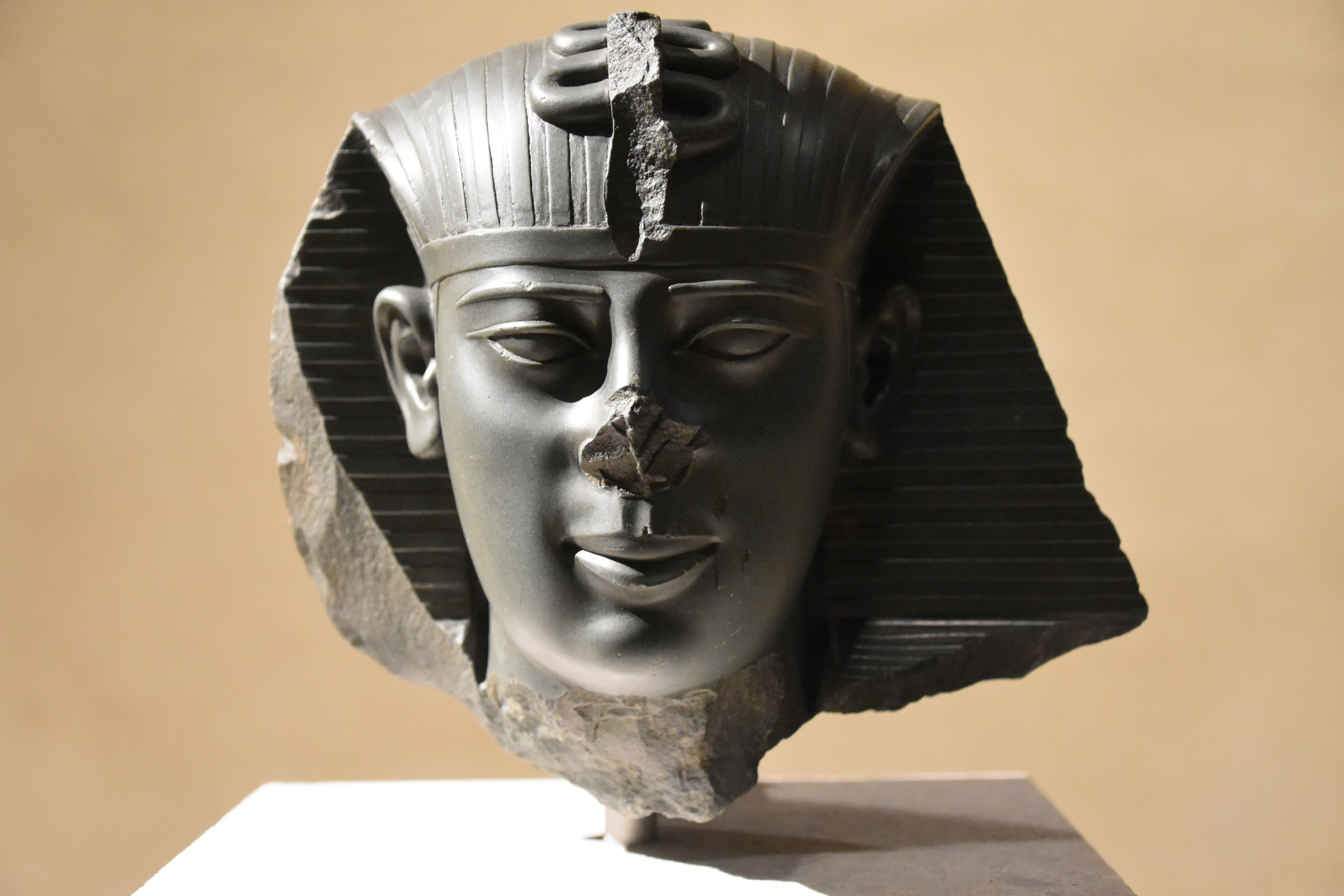
Head of a statue of pharaoh Amasis, 26th dynasty, ca. 550 BCE; Pergamon Museum, Berlin (Destruction of the royal symbols of the statue).

In some cases, the defacement of statues was directly linked to political motives, serving as a tool to delegitimize former rulers or erase their symbolic presence from the public sphere. This type of vandalism included: breaking noses, disfiguring faces, smashing crowns and royal symbols, and erasing royal names from inscriptions.

This defacement was intended not only to disable the statue as a religious entity, but also to erase the person's very existence from collective memory and the afterlife, making this type of vandalism part of an internal political-religious conflict that reached its peak during certain periods of the New kingdom.

==== Tomb robbers ====
In addition to official or ritual mutilation, evidence suggests that there were cases of mutilation carried out by individuals, such as grave robbers, motivated by fear of the deceased's revenge or posthumous agency. In these cases, the goal was not political or ideological, but rather preventive, as breaking the nose or limbs was seen as a means of neutralizing potential power.

While the pharaoh issued threats against anyone who thought of defacing his image, attacks on tombs were equally serious and frightening. A man named Wersu the Copt, who lived during the 18th Dynasty (c. 1539–1295 BC), recorded a threat against anyone who wanted to damage his tomb statue with the following text:

Whoever attacks my corpse in the tomb and removes my statue from my tomb, [the sun god] Ra will hate him. He will have no water from the altar of [the god] Osiris, and he will not pass on his possessions to his children forever.

==== Destroying the nose was not always easy ====
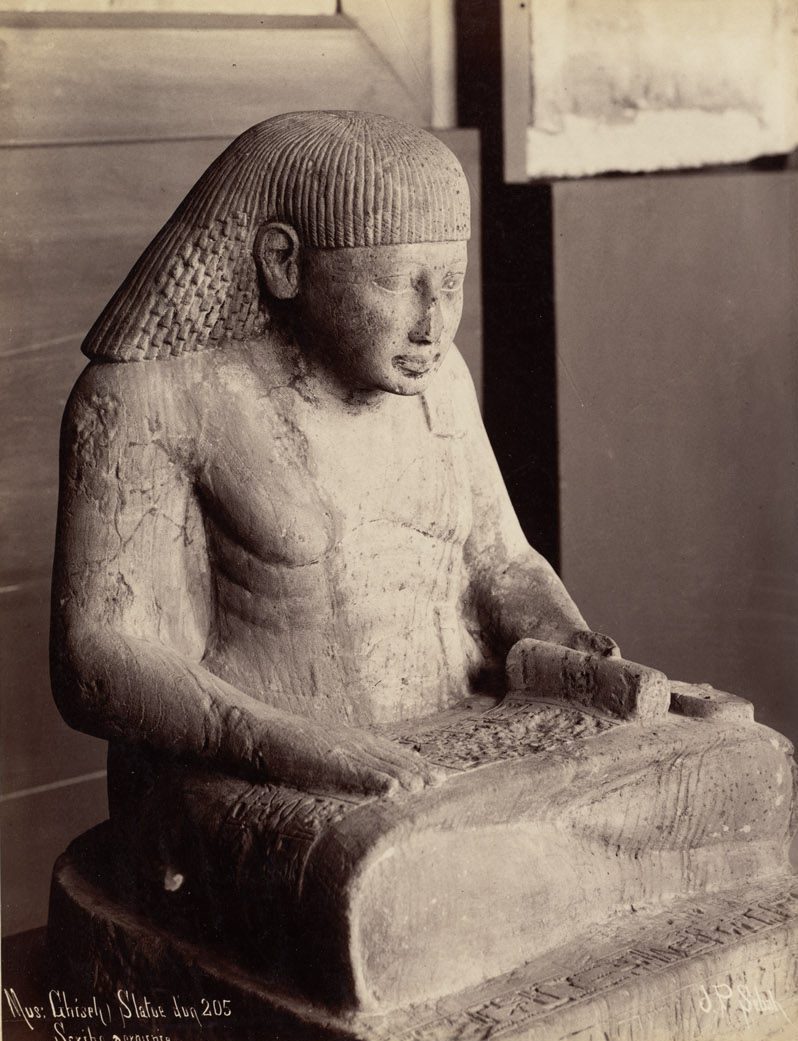
Statue of Egyptian Scribe

Some statues were completely destroyed, while others had only specific parts destroyed. This was mainly due to the body and structure of the statue, as some statues were very hard due to the way they were carved. The statues in the book provide an explanation, as some are missing their entire head, while others are only missing their nose. The difference between them is that the first type had a smooth back, indicating that it did not have thick hair, while the second type had thick, heavy hair that reached down to its neck and shoulders, so it was easier to break only the nose.

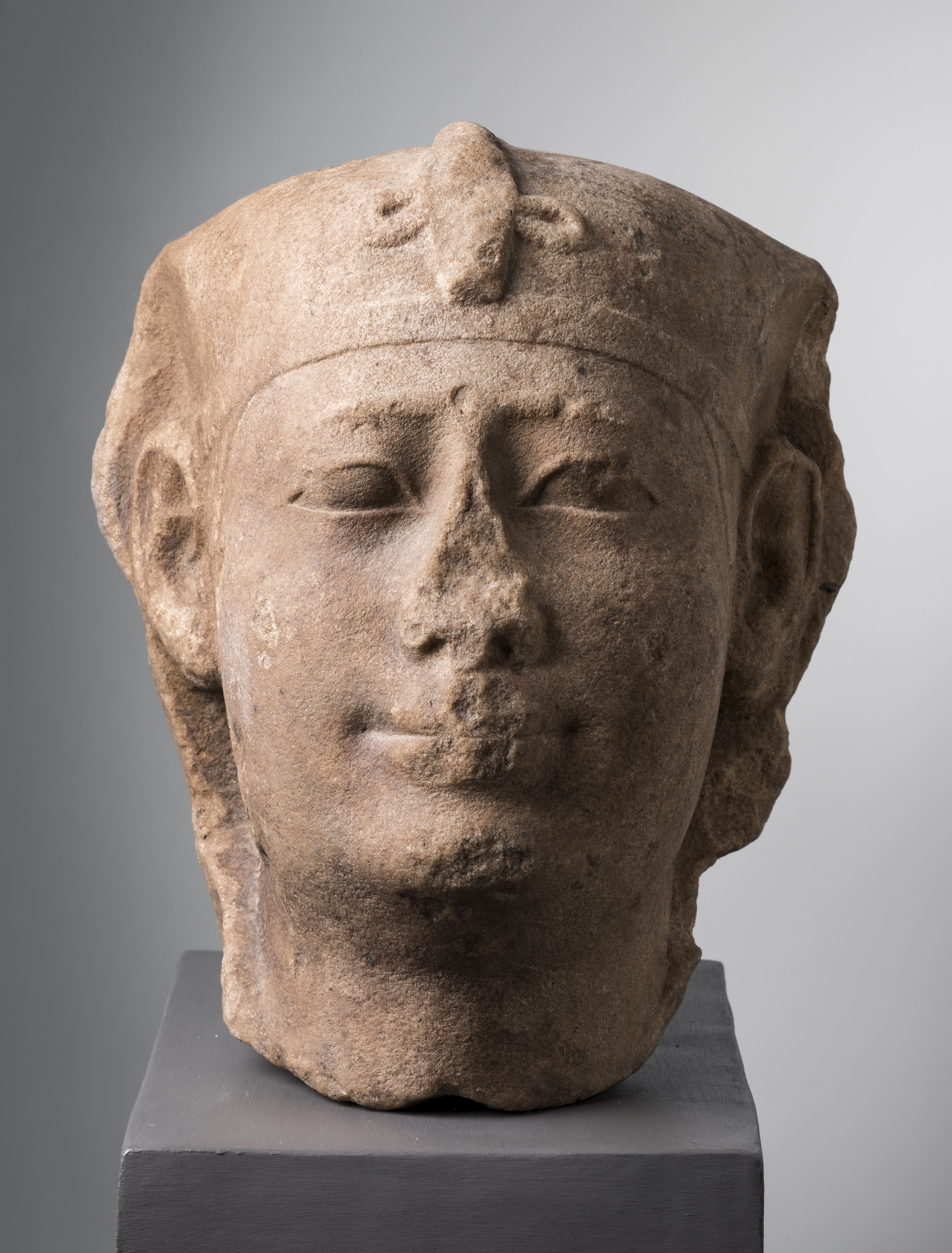
Head of a royal statue Ptolemy II (Destruction of the royal symbols of the statue)

=== Ptolemaic and Roman Egypt ===
These practices continued to be common in both Ptolemaic and Roman Egypt. In the late Roman period, the Greek historian Plutarch described the mutilation of the body of the god Osiris by his brother Seth as the ultimate way to weaken an Egyptian god.

A series of inscriptions carved on temple walls describe how Egyptian gods could occupy an image and thus bring it to life. In the temple of Dendera, an inscription states that the goddess Hathor flies from the sky to enter the horizon of her soul [her temple] on earth, flies to her body, and joins her form. Other phrases carved on the walls of the temple of Dendera refer to the fusion of the god Osiris with a prominent representation of himself: "Osiris... comes as a spirit... sees his mysterious form depicted in its place and his personality engraved on the wall enters his mysterious form descends upon his image. Thus, two-dimensional and three-dimensional images can serve as places of existence for the gods, and thus become places where humans can encounter the god.

=== Byzantine Egypt (early Christianity) ===
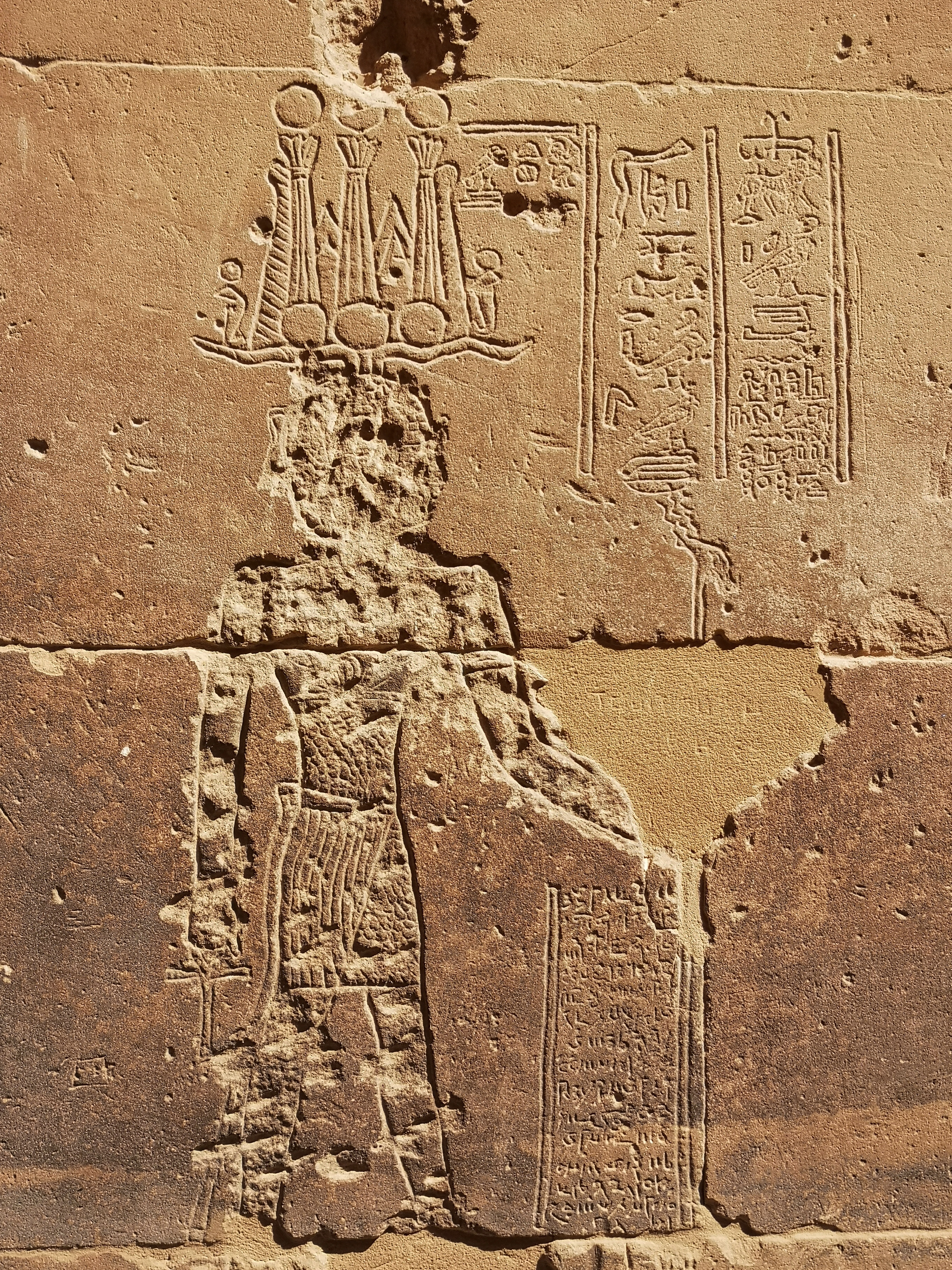
The Graffito of Esmet-Akhom, the last known inscription written in Egyptian hieroglyphs, inscribed on Hadrian's Gate in AD 394, Philae, Egypt.

During the fourth and fifth centuries, Christianity became the dominant religion in Egypt, but people still recognized the power of statues. Some particularly zealous church leaders, such as St. Shenouta and St. Augustine, called for attacks on "idols"—religious images intended for worship—as a way to demonstrate their failure in the face of Christian power. The biography of St. Shenouta, written by his successor, describes twice how he traveled to destroy "pagan" statues.

With the spread of the ancient Egyptian language in its new form, Coptic, the use of hieroglyphics became limited, which helped in determining the specific periods in which the vandalism occurred. When the inscription is damaged in certain places, such as targeting the name of an individual, this proves that the damage dates back to the Pharaonic era. whereas the focus on removing part of the body without damaging the inscription was in late antiquity, because they were no longer able to read hieroglyphics.

As late as the eighth century AD, a guide to ancient monuments in Constantinople warned that "caution should be exercised when viewing ancient statues, especially pagan ones."

=== Islamic Egypt ===
During Islamic Egypt, statues no longer posed a threat because beliefs about the supernatural powers they embodied had faded, unlike in previous eras. The destruction of statues was random, whether for Islamic religious reasons or for reasons such as using the statues as resources for constructing new buildings.

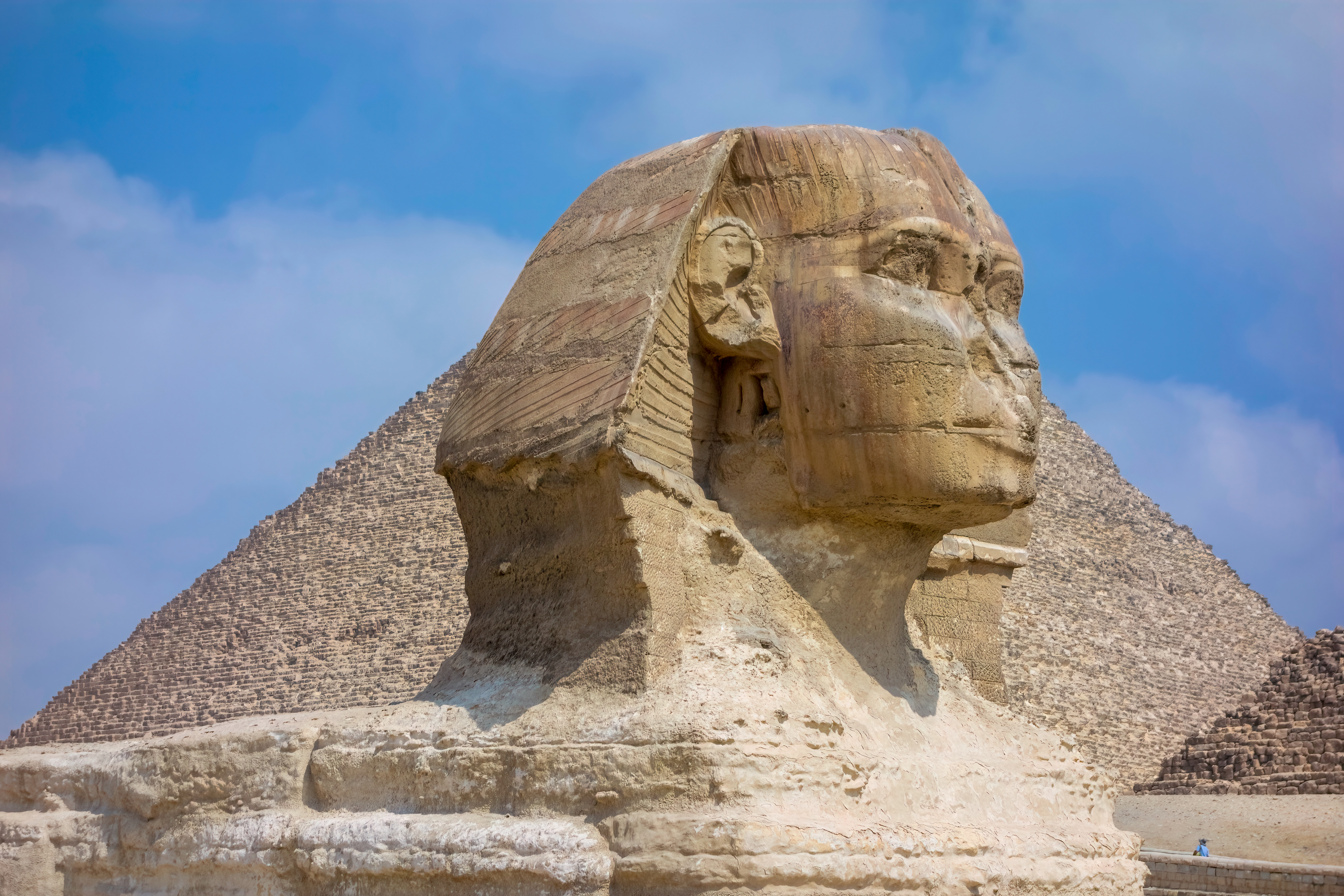
Great Sphinx of Giza

Before the Egyptian language was deciphered and Egyptology became a science, the Great Sphinx of Giza was one of the most prominent statues with a broken nose. Rumors spread for decades that Napoleon Bonaparte had broken it, but it later became clear that some works of art that predated Napoleon's presence in Egypt depicted the Sphinx without a nose. The historian Al-Maqrizi documented that the Sphinx's nose had been missing since the 15th century and claimed that a Fatimid sheikh named Muhammad Sa'im al-Dahr was responsible for its disappearance.

== Natural deterioration ==
There are also natural causes of erosion that lead to the breaking of statues' noses, or their general disfigurement, such as wind, rain, heat, and contraction and expansion. However, it is possible to tell whether a nose has been deliberately destroyed by looking at the cut marks on the statue.

== Afrocentric claims ==
Followers of Afrocentrism believe that Egyptian statues were deliberately distorted to hide their black features. This idea is widely spread on the internet and in non-academic books, but it has been scientifically disproven. The breaking of noses and royal symbols in statues was due to religious and political reasons. These practices appear in different eras and in all Egyptian statues, whether they are of Egyptians, or foreign pharaohs such as the Ptolemies and Nubians.

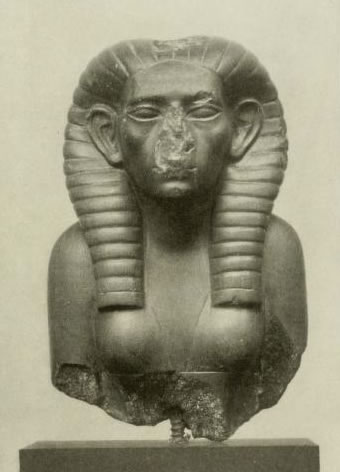

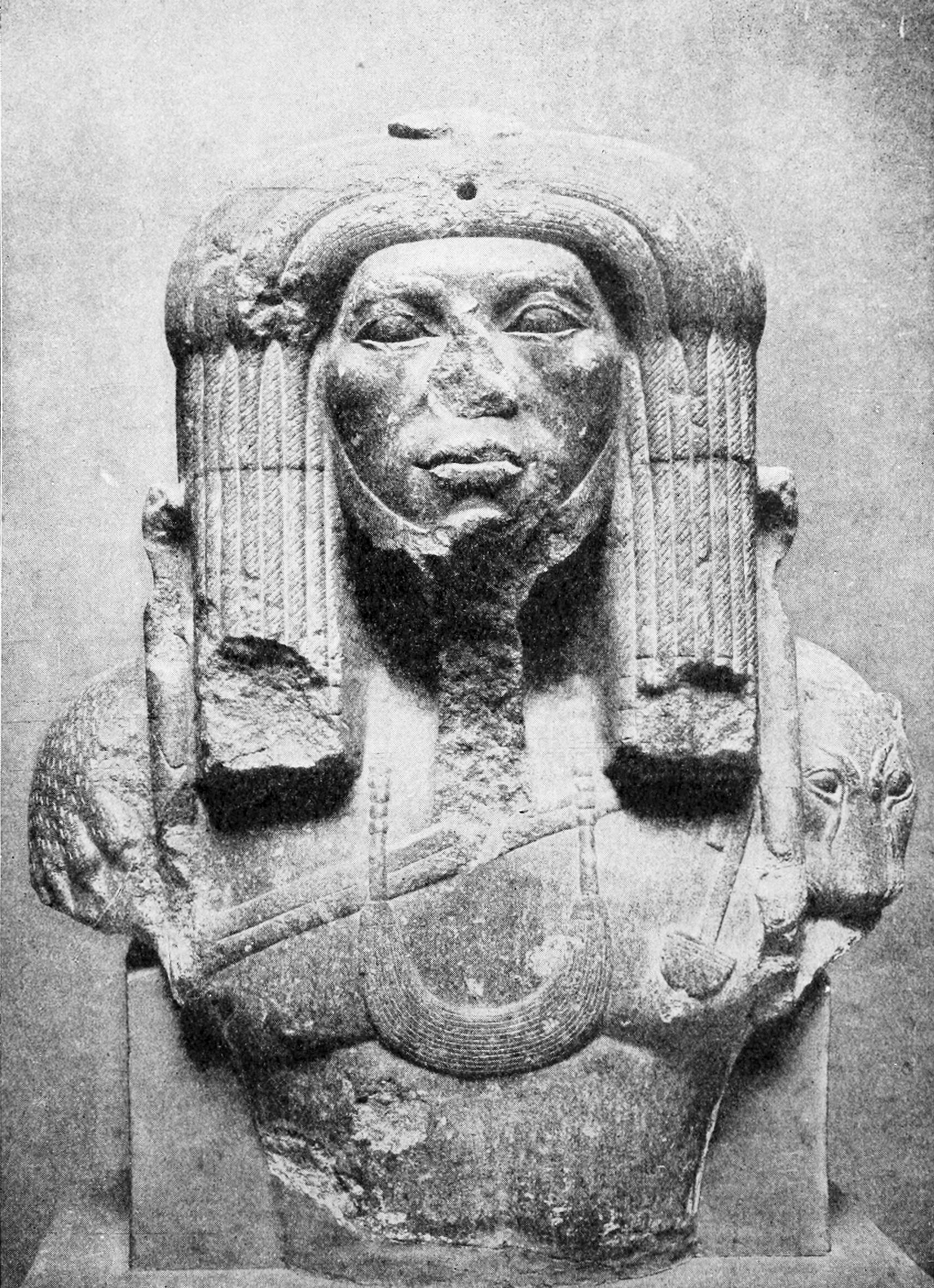

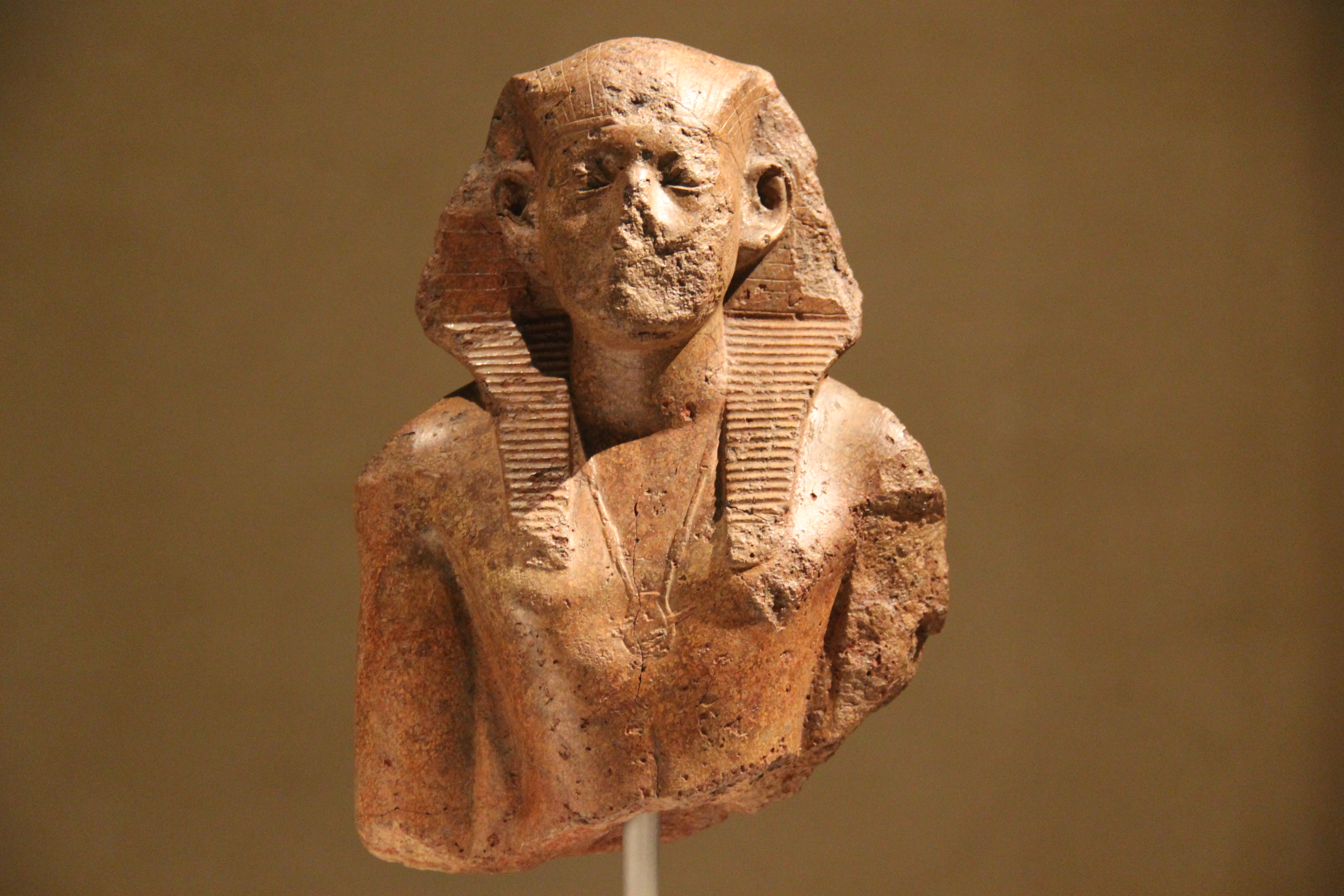

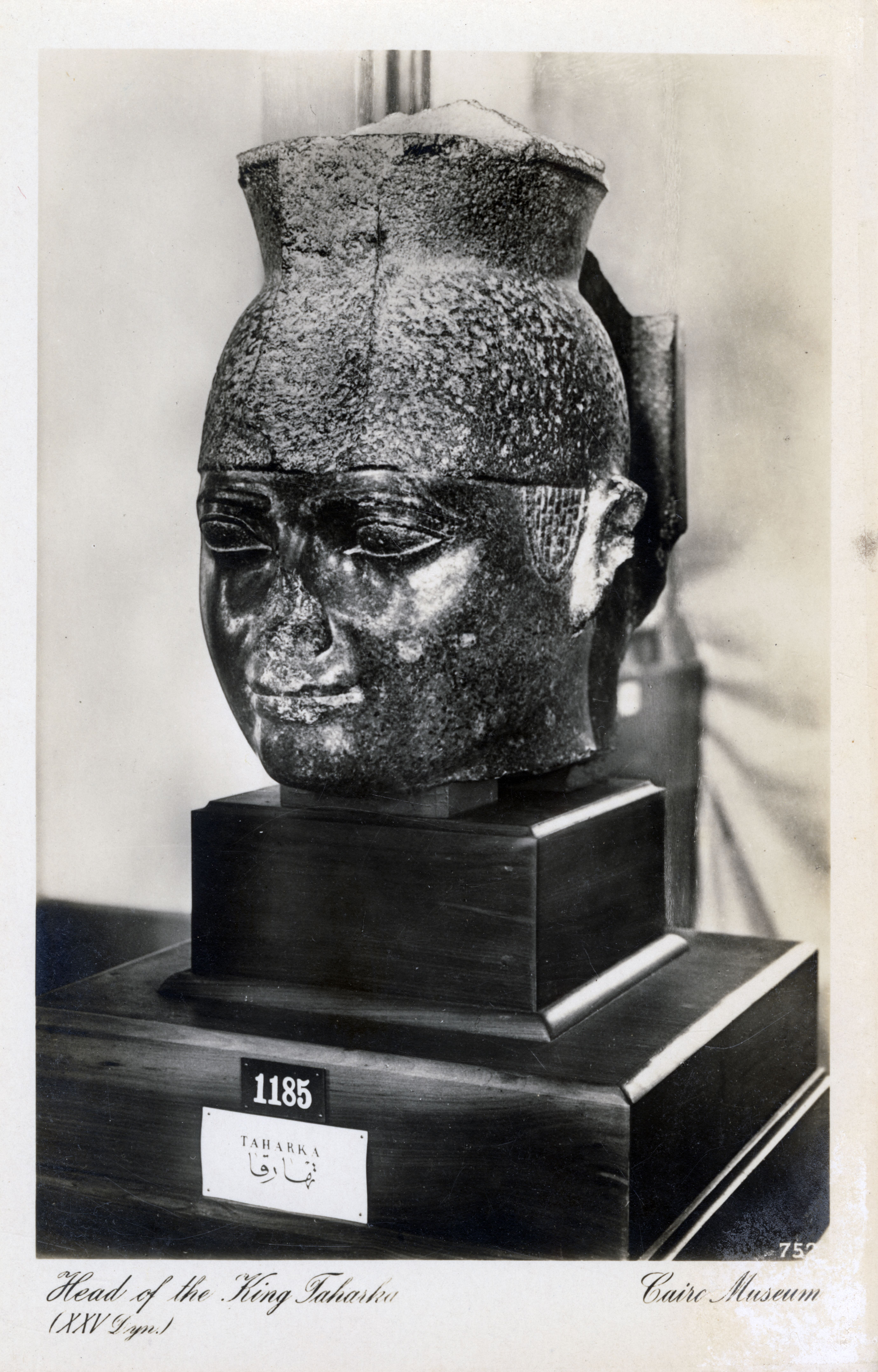

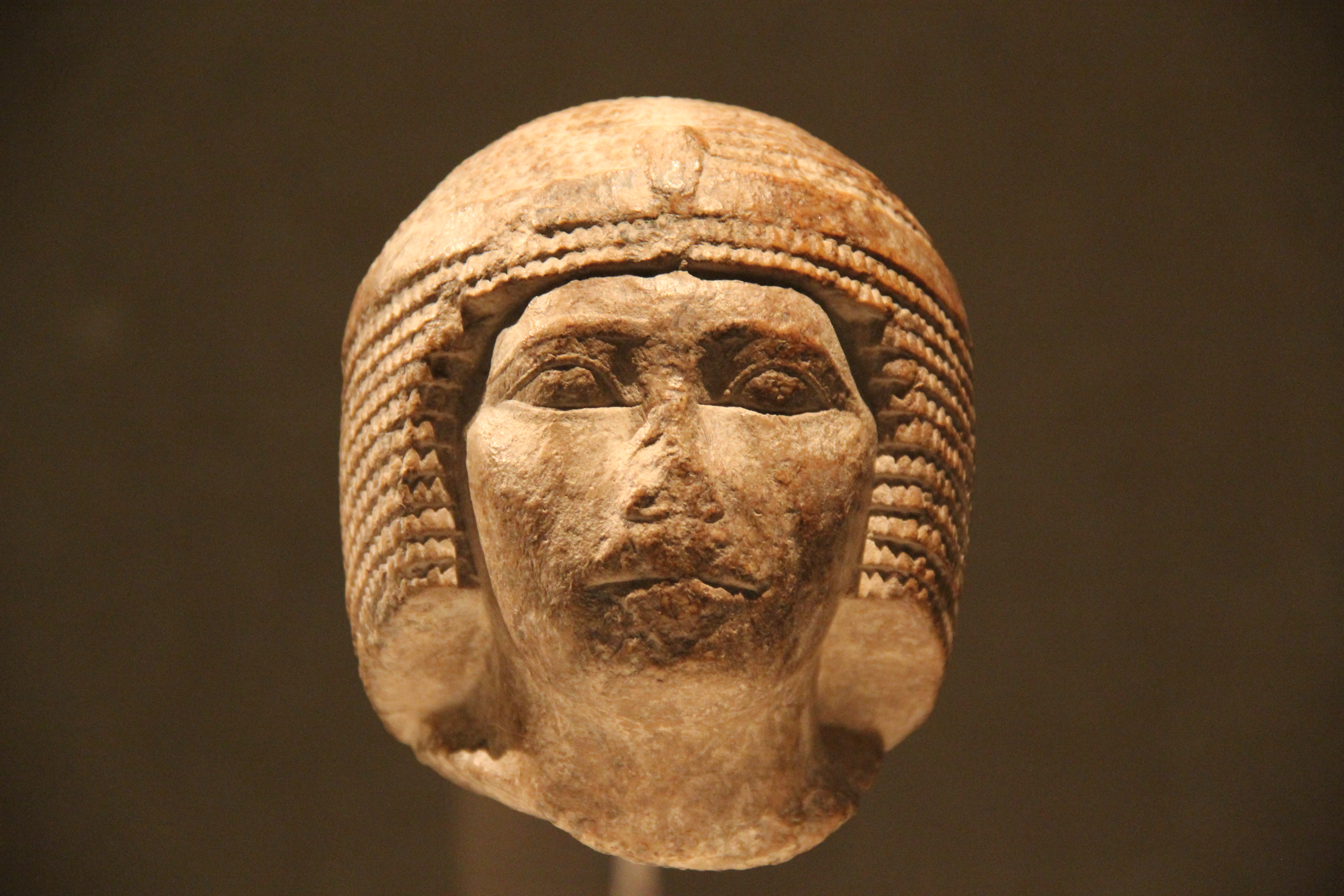

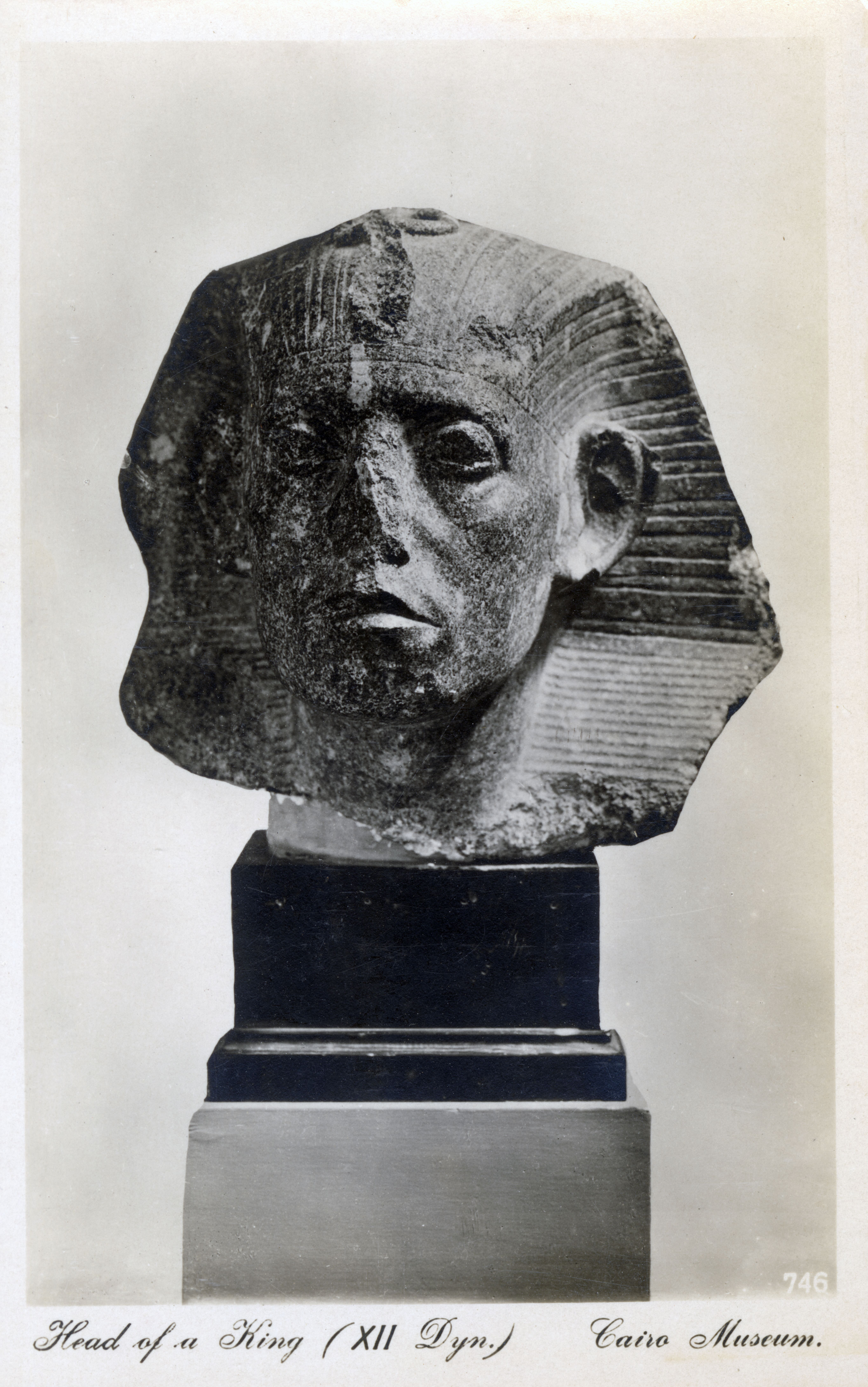

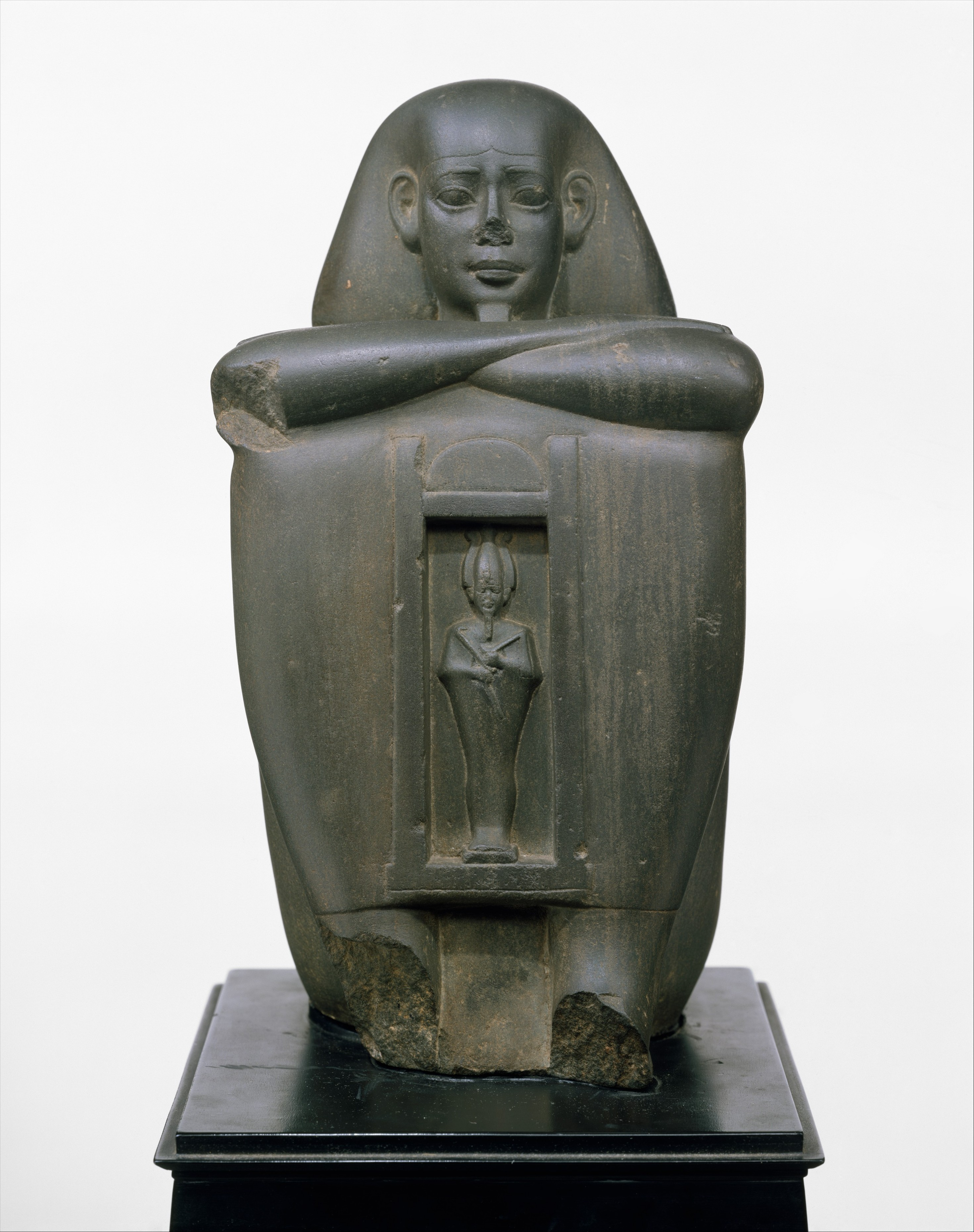

=== Statues in good condition ===
While the phenomenon of broken noses on ancient Egyptian statues is widespread, there are still thousands of ancient Egyptian statues in excellent condition.

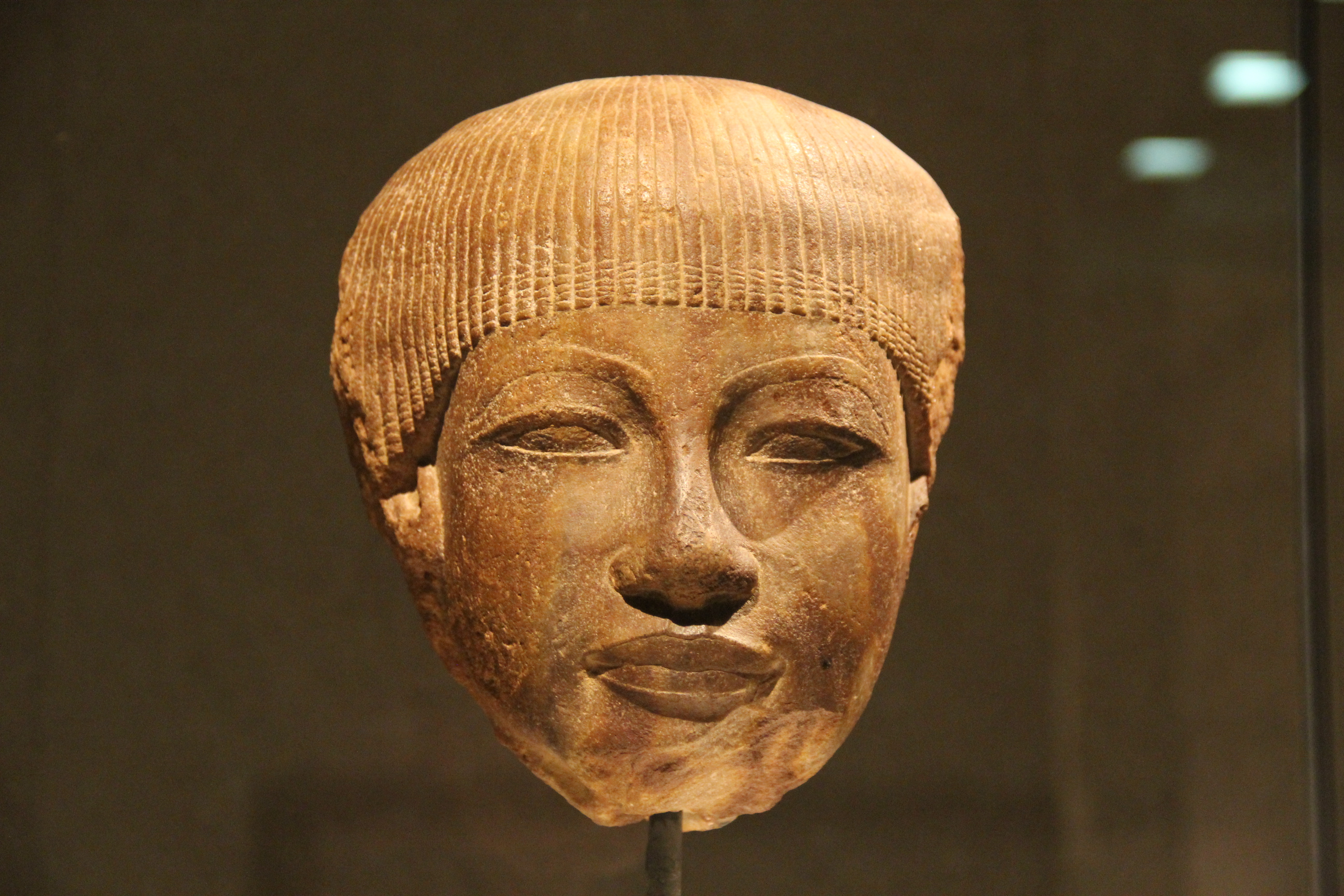

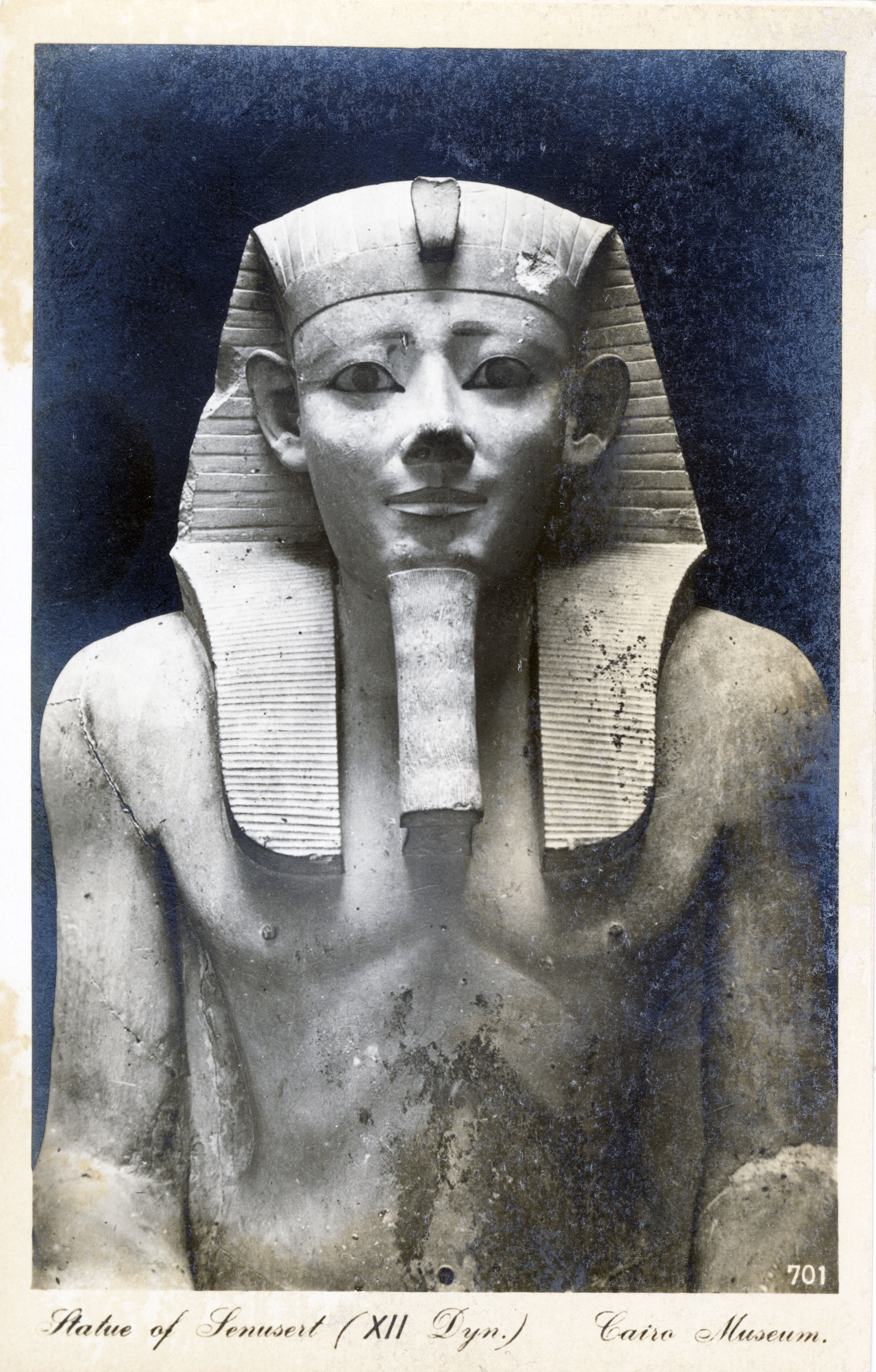

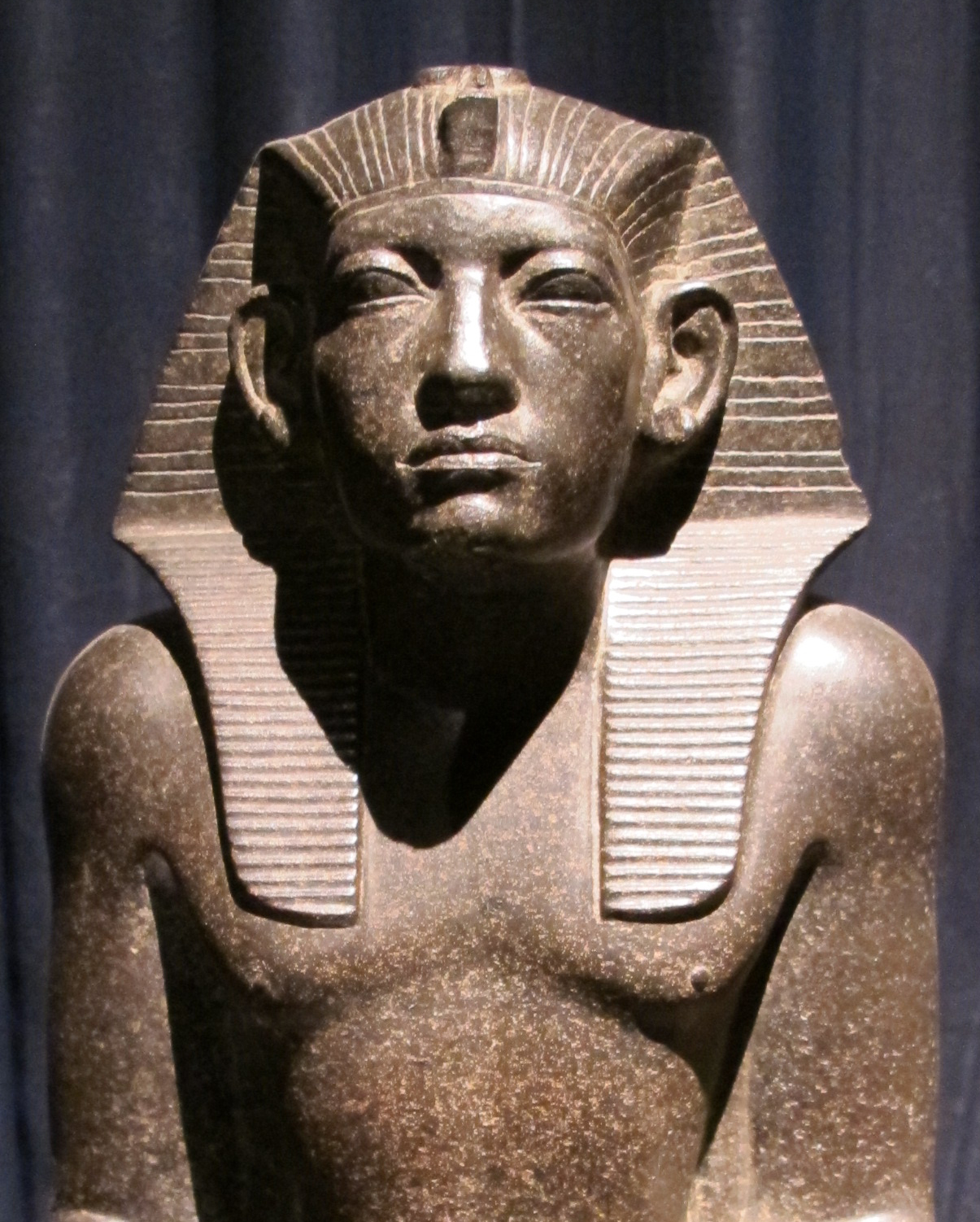

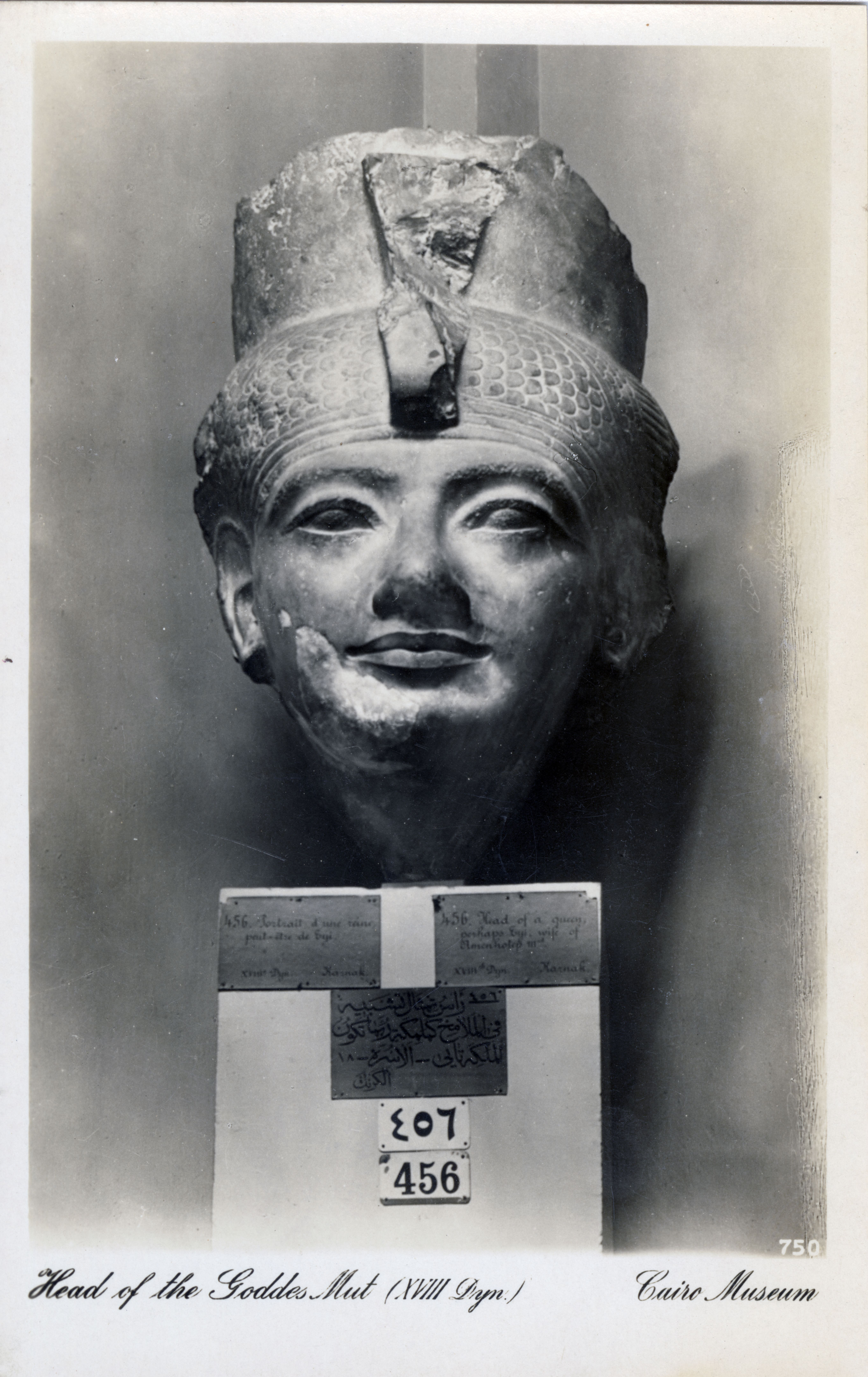

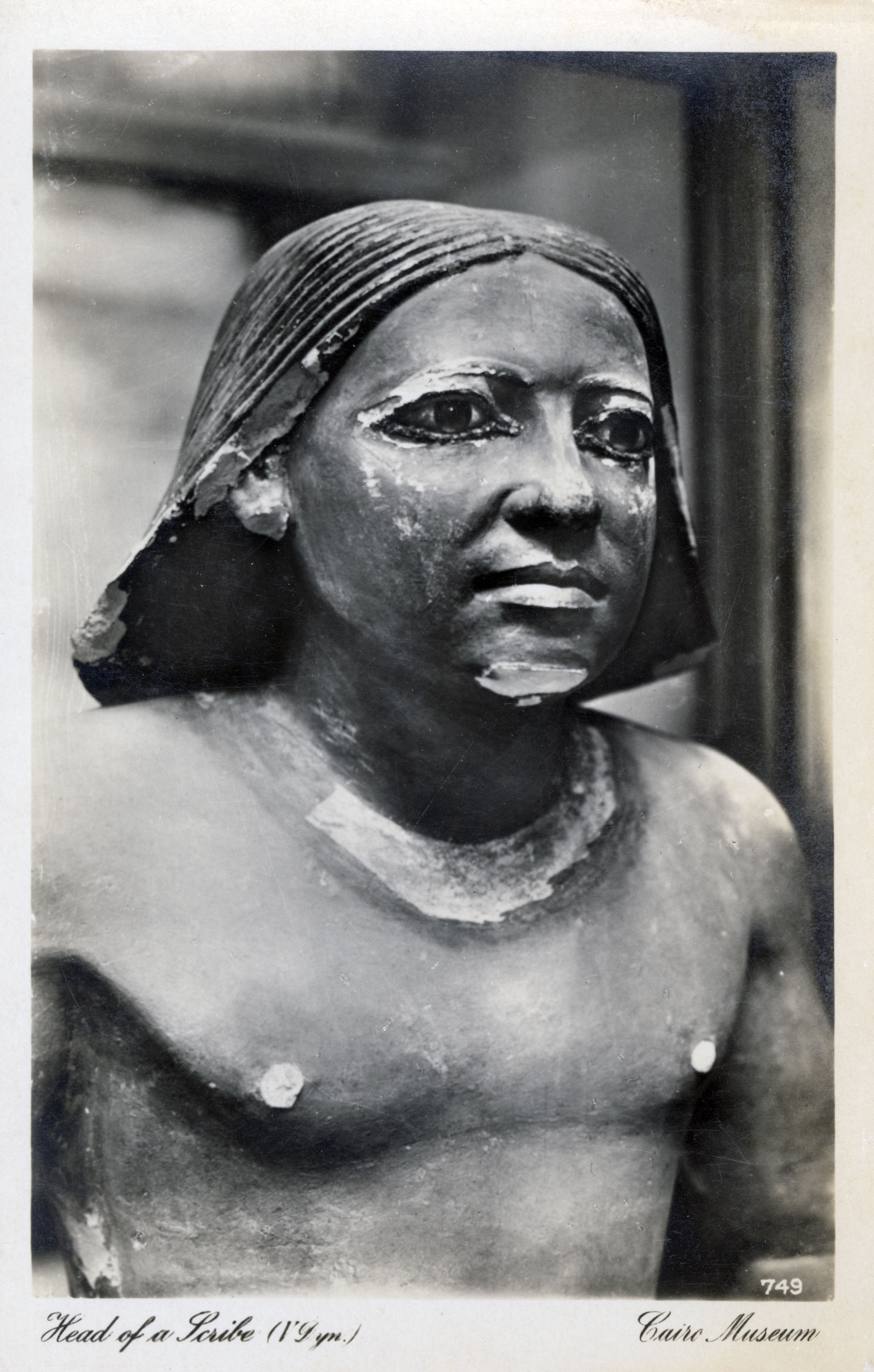

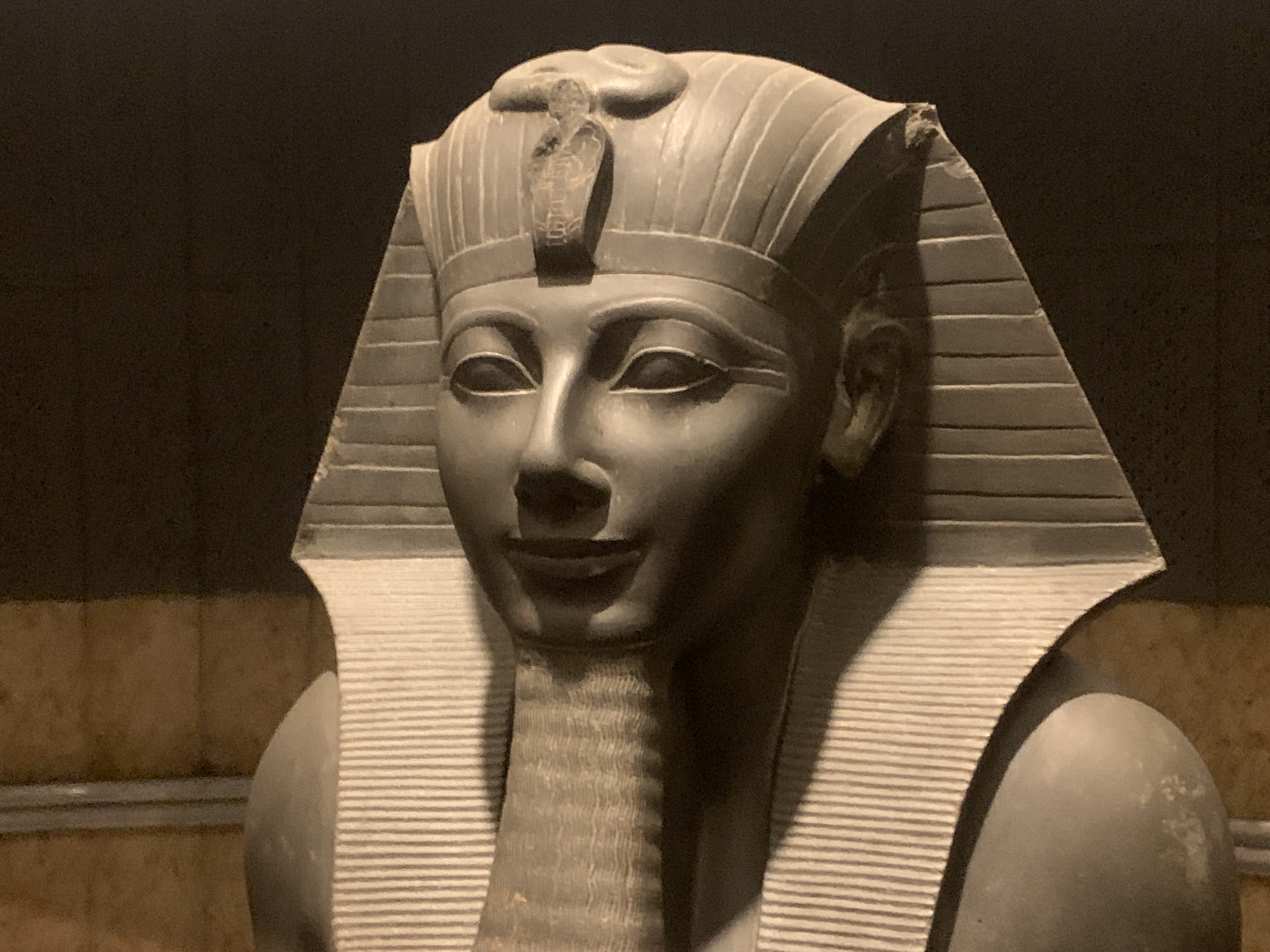

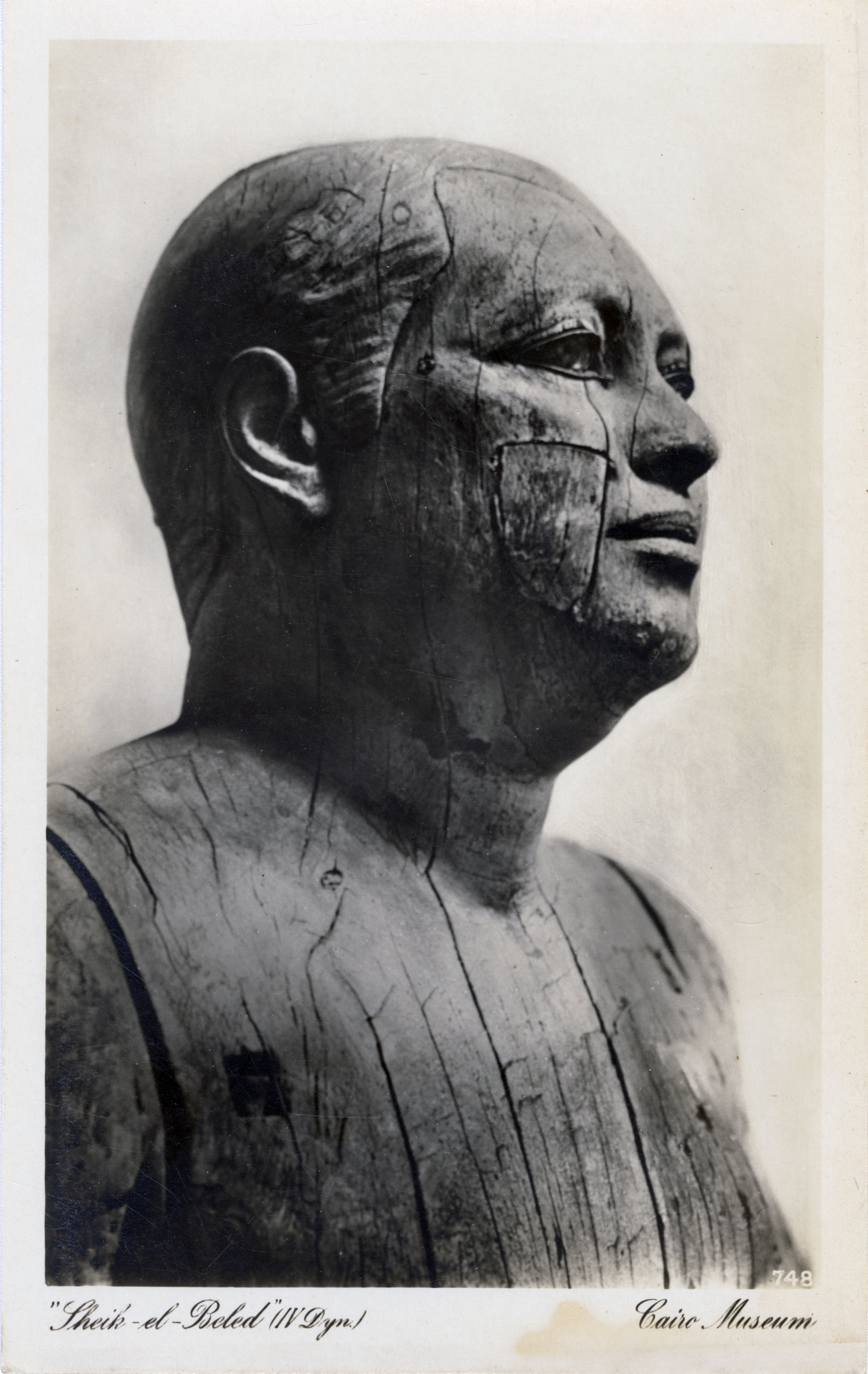

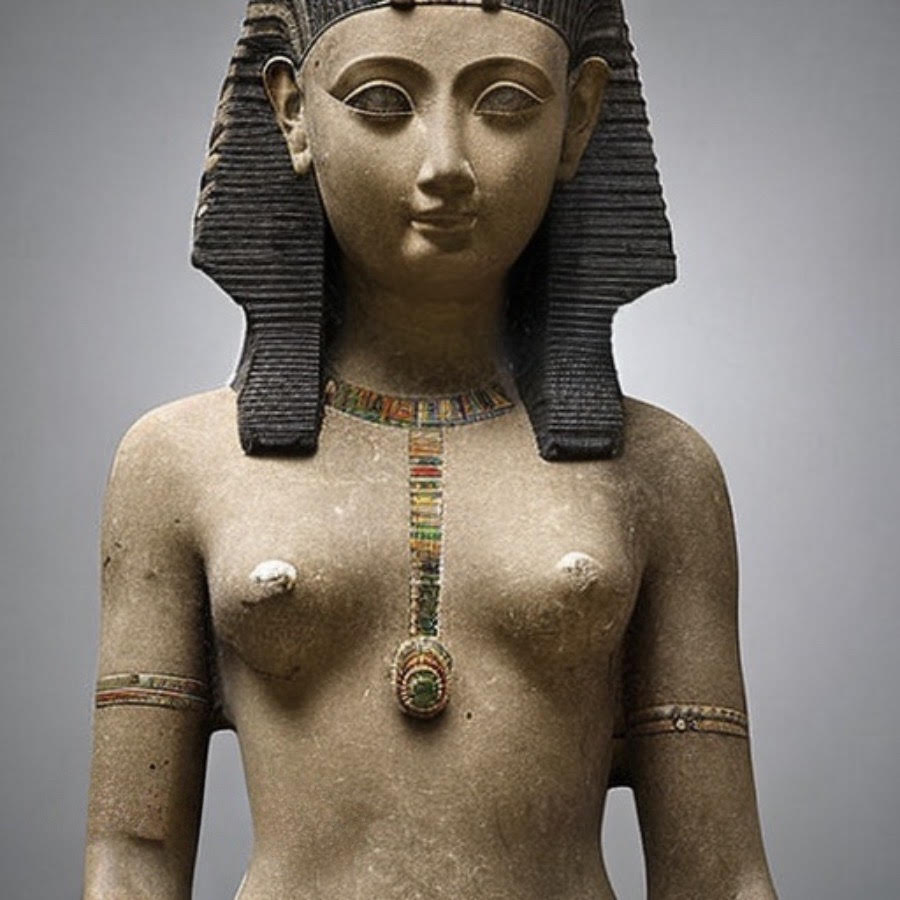

== See also ==
- Ancient Egyptian race controversy
