= Antonio del Río =

Antonio del Río (c. 1745 – c. 1789) was a captain who led the first excavation of the Maya ruins of Palenque in Chiapas, Mexico. The expedition was undertaken in 1787 for Charles III of Spain, following reports of the ruins from native inhabitants. It took the team two weeks to dig, and it then spent three weeks studying the site. He was accompanied by Ricardo Almendáriz who created drawings of the ruins still considered scientifically useful.
