= 1938 in archaeology =

Below are notable events in archaeology that occurred in 1938.

== Explorations ==
- Matthew Stirling first visits the Tres Zapotes and San Lorenzo Tenochtitlán sites.

== Excavations ==
- The Iron Age farmstead site at Little Woodbury, Wiltshire, England, by Gerhard Bersu for the Prehistoric Society using open area excavation techniques (continues to 1939; published 1940).
- Llantwit Major Roman Villa in Wales, by V. E. Nash-Williams (continues to 1948).
- The Neolithic settlement of Rinyo on Rousay in Orkney, Scotland, by V. Gordon Childe (resumed 1946).
- Tomb of King Denis of Portugal (d. 1325) in St. Denis Convent, Odivelas, is opened.

== Finds ==
- June - TM 1517, first remains of Paranthropus robustus, from Kromdraai fossil site in South Africa.
- Maya site of Caracol is rediscovered.
- Luther Cressman, the first to explore the region, discovers preserved 9,000-year-old shredded sage sandals at Fort Rock Cave in south central Oregon, USA. Until radiocarbon dating verifies his find, his belief has been that humans had occupied the area a maximum of 4,000 years ago.
- 'Barber surgeon of Avebury'.
- Bronze Head from Ife.
- Tell Brak Head found by Max Mallowan at Tell Brak in Syria.

== Publications ==
- T. D. Kendrick - Anglo-Saxon Art to A.D. 900.
- Wilhelm König - "Ein Galvanisches Element aus der Partherzeit?". Forschungen und Fortschritte 14:8–9 (on the "Baghdad Battery").

== Births ==
- March 8 - Lamia Al-Gailani Werr, Iraqi archaeologist (died 2019)
- October 4 - Gennady Zdanovich, Russian archaeologist (died 2020)
- Anthony Aveni, American anthropologist

== Deaths ==
- February 24 - Thomas Gann, British explorer and archaeologist (born 1867)
- August 9 - Leo Frobenius, German ethnologist (born 1873)
