= Marcel Jérôme Rigollot =

French doctor and antiquarian

Dr Marcel-Jérôme Rigollot (30 September 1786 – 29 December 1854) was a nineteenth-century French medical doctor and antiquarian famous for his role in the identification of evidence of some of Europe's earliest inhabitants.

Working near Amiens, he was initially critical of the claims of Jacques Boucher de Perthes who believed he had found artefacts that dated back hundreds of thousands of years to what is now called the Lower Paleolithic. In 1855 however he began to find examples of stone tools himself whilst studying the river gravels of the Somme in an effort to disprove his opponents. The tools' position within the gravel attested to their age geologically and following visits to the site of Abbeville and Saint-Acheul by the paleontologist Hugh Falconer and the geologist Joseph Prestwich the great age of the tools was accepted by the wider archaeological community.
