= 1866 in archaeology =

Below are notable events in archaeology that occurred in 1866.

== Explorations ==
- Architect Thomas Drew draws attention to the significance of St. Audoen's Church, Dublin, Ireland.

== Excavations ==
- Discovery and first excavation of Fertőrákos mithraeum.
- Amateur antiquarian John Mellor excavates at the site of Hyde Abbey near Winchester in England, finding bones which he presumes to be of Alfred the Great.

== Publications ==
- Posthumous publication by Édouard Lartet of Henry Christy's Reliquiae Aquitanicae, being contributions to the archaeology and palaeontology of Perigord and the adjacent provinces of southern France commences.

== Finds ==
- February 26 - The Calaveras Skull is discovered in California. Purported to be evidence of humans in North America during the Pliocene epoch, it turns out to be a hoax.
- The prehistoric sculpture Swimming Reindeer is found in France.
- The first copy of the Decree of Canopus is found at Tanis.

== Births ==
- May 23 - Edgar J. Banks, American antiquarian (d. 1945).
- June 26 - George Herbert, 5th Earl of Carnarvon, British Egyptological excavation sponsor (d. 1923).

== See also ==
- List of years in archaeology
- 1865 in archaeology
- 1867 in archaeology
