= Ricardo Almendáriz =

- Known for: Drawings of the Palenque Maya ruins; documentation of early archaeological expedition

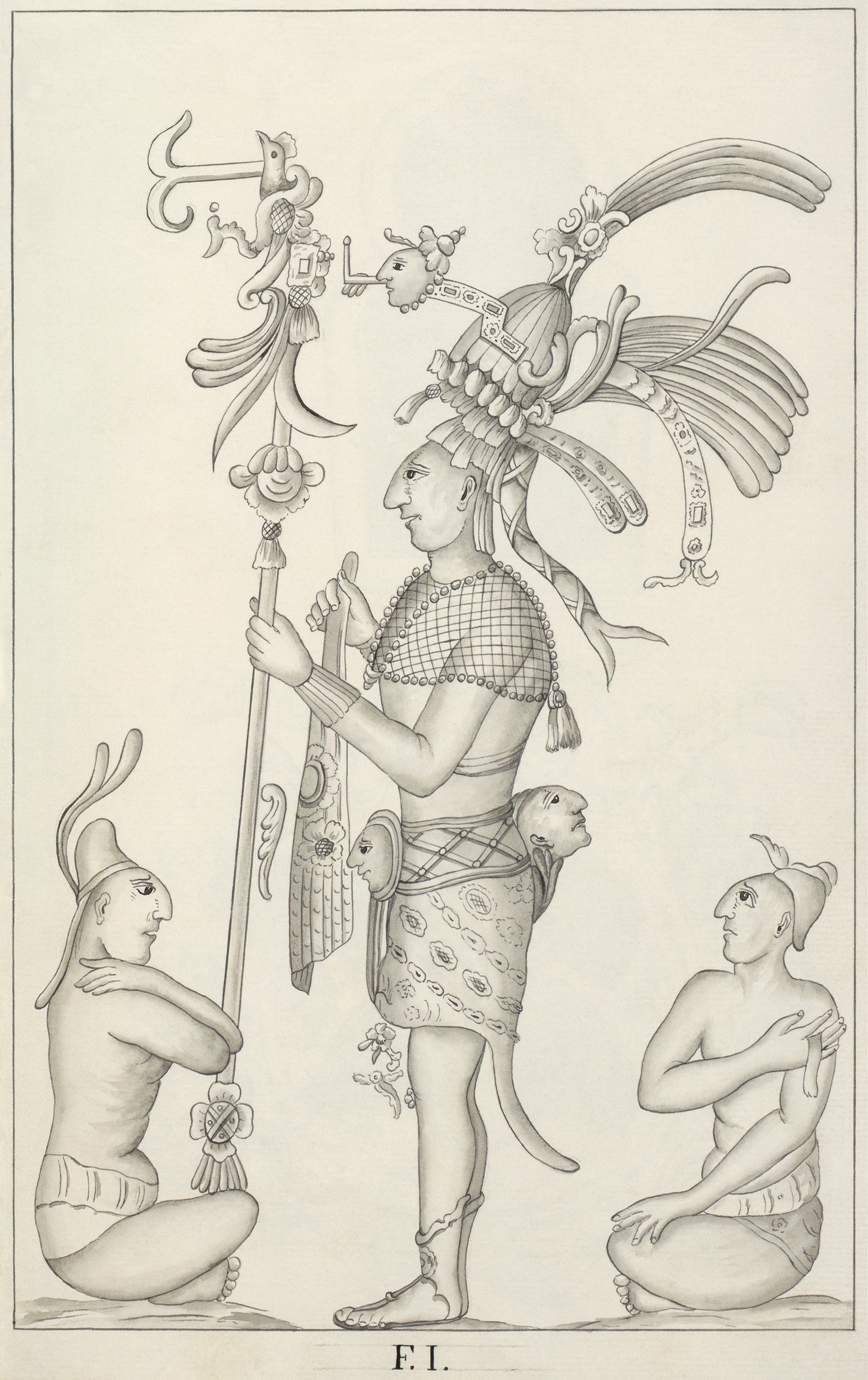
Illustration by Almendáriz of a stucco relief at Palenque. The relief, dating to ca. 670CE, appears on the exterior face of Pier E in House A, part of the central complex of buildings known as the Palace (el Palacio).The drawing is a copy made from the original (now lost) engraving executed by Almendáriz during his visit to the site in 1787.

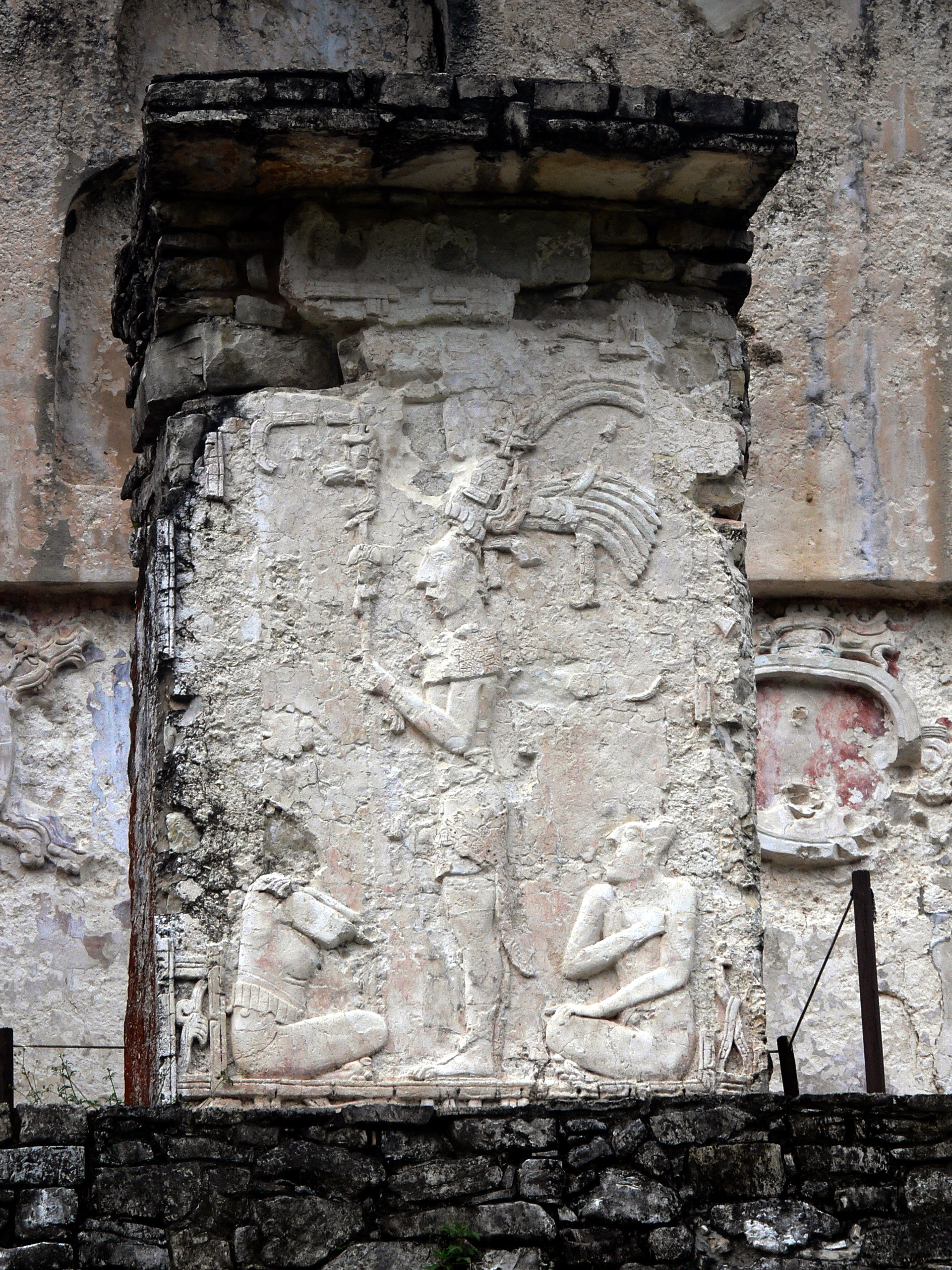
Contemporary photograph of the same feature, taken in 2008.

Ricardo Almendáriz (fl. 1787) was a draftsman from New Spain who accompanied Antonio del Río to the first excavation of pre-Columbian Maya ruins at Palenque in Chiapas, Mexico. Undertaken in May and June 1787, the expedition was performed under orders from Charles III of Spain, to investigate reports about the ruins from the inhabitants of the neighboring pueblo of Santo Domingo de Palenque. The team spent two weeks digging at the location, followed by three weeks studying the site.

Almendáriz made thirty drawings of the bas relief sculptures at the Palenque ruins. These drawings were intended to accompany del Río's written report, which was dated June 24, 1787. According to George Stuart, writing for the Kislak Foundation, the del Río report "ranks as the first substantial archaeological report known in the Americas." Almendáriz's drawings of Palenque are "remarkably accurate for the era" and depict features of Palenque that have since been destroyed from exposure. For this reason they remain scientifically useful.

The Almendáriz drawings were copied for archival purposes. The most complete set of contemporary copies belongs to the library of the Royal Palace in Madrid.
