= Boston Green Head =

4th-century BC Egyptian sculpture

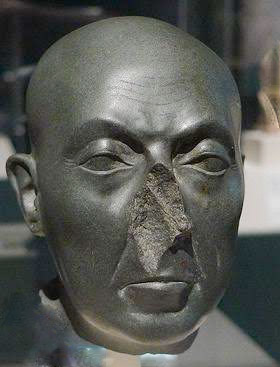
- Material: Greywacke
- Created: 380 – 332 BC
- Discovered: 1858
- Present location: Museum of Fine Arts, Boston
- Identification: 04.1749

The Boston Green Head is a greywacke sculptured head of an Egyptian priest from the Late Period of ancient Egypt. The head is dated to 380–332 BC and is housed in the Museum of Fine Arts, Boston, United States.

== Provenance ==
The head is believed to have been found in 1858 at the Serapeum of Saqqara. Later, Muhammed Said Pasha, a pro-French viceroy of Egypt, gave it to Prince Napoleon Joseph Charles Paul Bonaparte.

In 1904, the head was purchased by the Boston Museum of Fine Arts from Edward Perry Warren.

== See also ==
- Berlin Green Head
