= Moulin Quignon =

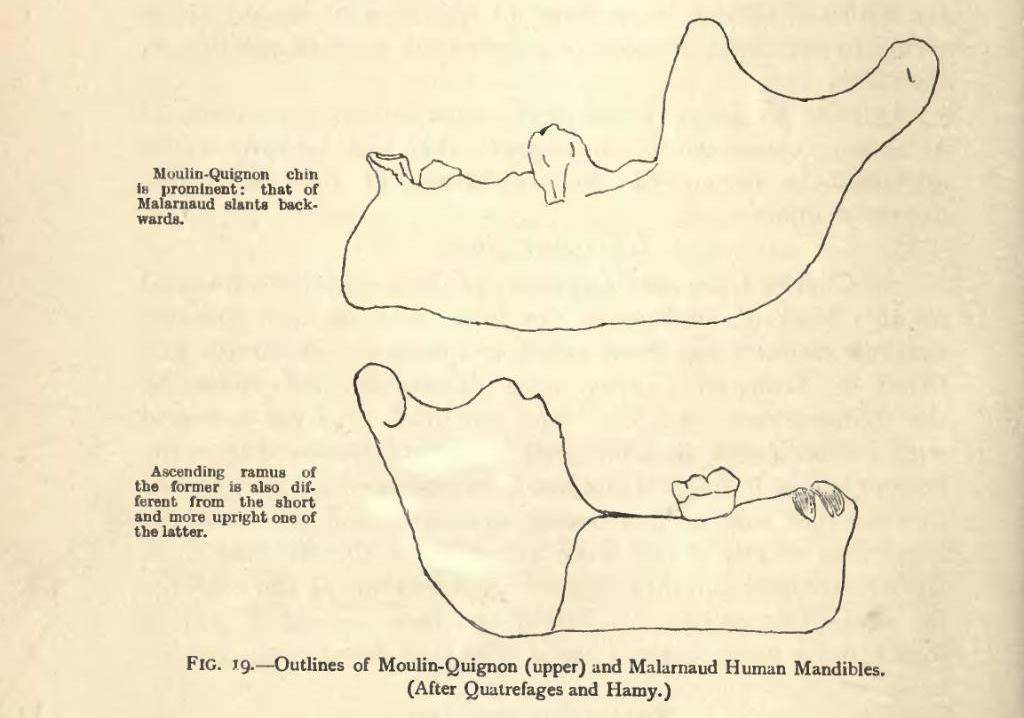
The Moulin Quignon mandible (above) compared to a neanderthal mandible (below)

Moulin Quignon, a quarry near Abbeville, France, celebrated for the discovery in 1863 by Boucher de Perthes of a human jawbone believed to be referable to the Quaternary period.

By his collection of flints Boucher de Perthes had been the first to attempt to establish the existence of man in remote ages; but it had been objected that if the flints were indeed the work of man, human remains would have been found in association with them.

Considerable excitement therefore was created both in England and France by the "find" of bones at Moulin Quignon, and a commission of inquiry was appointed. The report was favourable to the genuineness of the relics, but latterly doubts have arisen as to whether they can be regarded as earlier than the Neolithic age.
