= Berlin Green Head =

Ancient Egyptian Statue Head

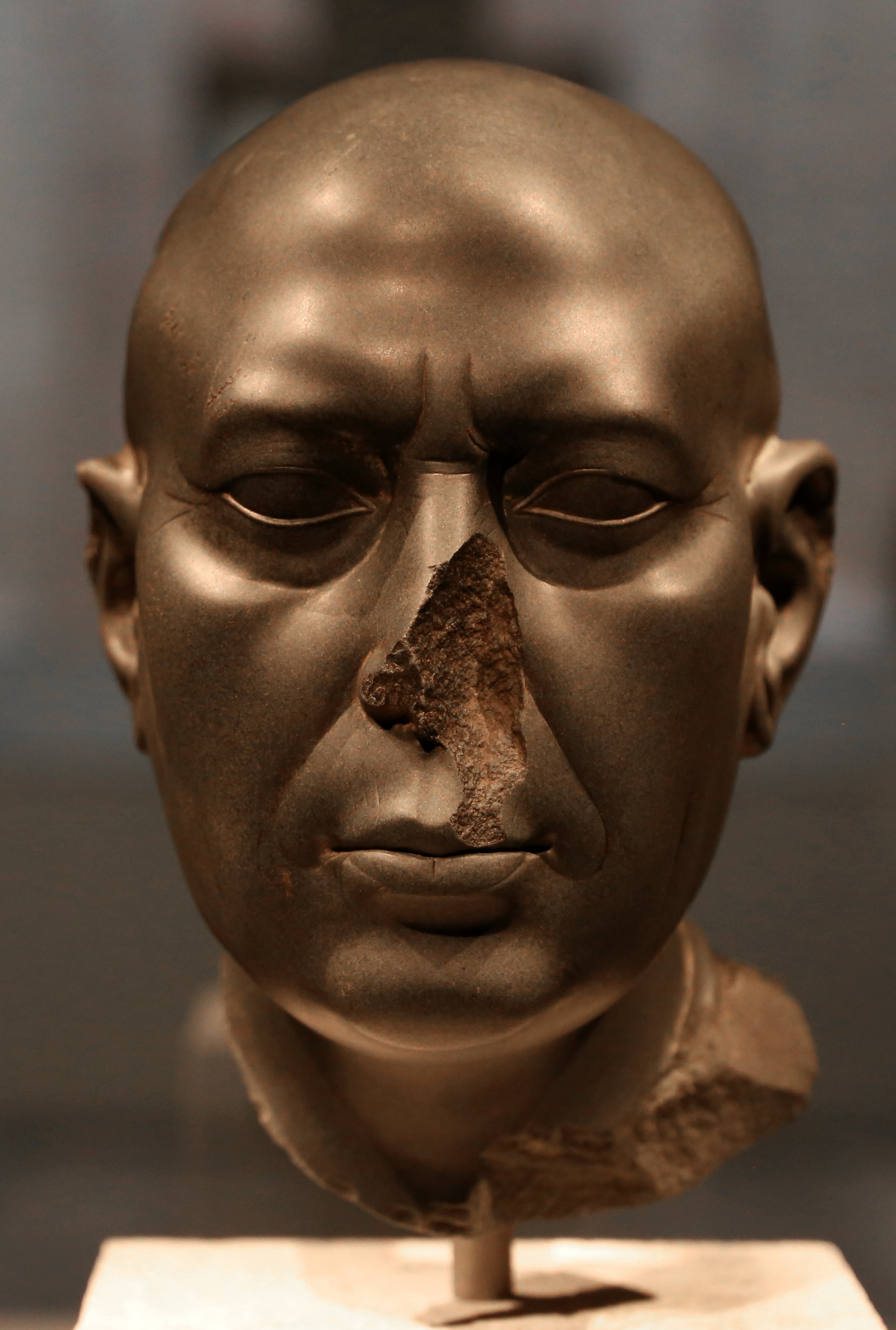
- Berlin Green Head
- Material: Greenschist
- Size: 21 cm (height) x 19 cm (depth)
- Created: 100-50 BCE
- Present location: Egyptian Museum of Berlin
- Identification: 12500

The Berlin Green Head is an ancient Egyptian statue head (AeMP 12500) made from greenschist and housed in the Egyptian Museum of Berlin, one floor down from the Nefertiti Bust in room 1.09. It has been considered the work of a highly skilled (though unknown) ancient Egyptian sculptor, as well as one of the most famous and credited pieces of art from the Late and Ptolemaic periods of ancient Egypt.

== Description ==
The face of the statue is calm and emotionless and, unusually for contemporary works of art, also perfectly symmetric, and it is that of an intelligent-looking, middle-aged man with many well-rendered wrinkles and lines. The statue's shaved, oval-shaped skull is so realistic that it was once believed that the sculptor could not have made it without ancient Greek knowledge of anatomy, a claim subsequently disproved by the analysis of similar, earlier Egyptian artworks. On the back of the head, the top portion of a conventional back pillar is still visible.

The whole artefact is uninscribed, thus the owner's name and titles are unknown. For the same reason, the statue could only be dated on stylistic grounds. Once regarded as art of the Saite Period, it was later attributed to the Ptolemaic Period by Friedrich Wilhelm von Bissing. In 1960, Bernard von Bothmer further reduced the time range between 100 and 50 BCE, arguing that the head reveals a maturity not compatible with the earlier Ptolemaic art, as well as a similarity with some upcoming Roman Republic-era Egyptian works. Its provenance is also unknown, as well as its trace before 1895, when it was acquired from the collections of prince Ibrahim Hilmy and Henry Wallis.

The Berlin Green Head has been compared to the similar, yet earlier Boston Green Head, with the former one having lost part of the "verism" (among that, the asymmetry) which is more prominent in the latter one, yet without compromising the characterization of the individual represented on it.
