= 1855 in archaeology =

Below are notable events in archaeology that occurred in 1855.

== Excavations ==
- May - Heath Wood barrow cemetery in England, by Thomas Bateman.
- Dalton Parlours Roman villa in Yorkshire, England, by F Carroll.

== Finds ==
- January 19 - Sarcophagus of Eshmunazar II in a necropolis near Sidon.
- Approximate date - Corraghy Heads and Corleck Head in Ireland.

== Events ==
- December 14 - inaugural meeting of the London and Middlesex Archaeological Society.

== Publications ==
- John Yonge Akerman - Remains of Pagan Saxondom.
- Churchill Babington (ed.) - Benefizio della Morte di Cristo, a remarkable book of the Reformation period.
- Emmanuel de Rougé - Notice de quelques textes hiéroglyphiques récemment publiés par M. Greene [Note on Some Hieroglyphic Texts Recently Published by Mr. Greene].

== Births ==
- September 10 - Robert Koldewey, German archaeologist (d. 1925).

== Deaths ==
- April 15 - William John Bankes, English Member of Parliament, explorer and Egyptologist (b. 1786).
