= 1868 in archaeology =

Below are notable events in archaeology that occurred in 1868.

== Excavations ==
- Charles Warren starts first excavations of Jericho.
- Grime's Graves in the English county of Norfolk is excavated in 1868-1870, including Gallery III2b of Greenwell's Pit.
- The Mammen excavation, a Viking Age site near Viborg in Jutland (Denmark) is excavated.
- At Les Eyzies, France, a cave site is excavated containing Cro-Magnon remains, at the end of La Rue du Scez overlooking Le Havre du Scez (Saie).
- At Nymphaeum (a Greek colony in the Crimea), a burial site is excavated, with six Scythian tombs.
- In Greece, philologist Spyridon Findiklis and his assistant Ioannis Papadakis begin the first excavations in Thebes and Plataea.
- Alfred Biliotti starts excavations at Ialysos on Rhodes.

== Finds ==
- The Mesha Stele is found.
- At Rome, the remains of the Porta Capena are found.
- At Les Eyzies, France, alongside the Cro-Magnon remains, numerous flint tools of Aurignacian manufacture are found.
- Hildesheim Treasure is found.
- The first Shapwick hoard of Roman coins is found in England.

== Births ==
- January 3: Franz Cumont, Belgian archaeologist and historian (died 1947)
- March 15: Albert Lythgoe, American Egyptologist, curator of the New York Metropolitan Museum (died 1934)
- July 14: Gertrude Bell, British archaeologist (died 1926)

== Deaths ==
- September 10: Jacques Boucher de Crèvecœur de Perthes, French archaeologist (born 1788)

== See also ==
- Neanderthal man
