= Dalton Parlours Roman villa =

Roman building in West Yorkshire, United Kingdom

Coordinates: 53.896147°N 1.3895472°W

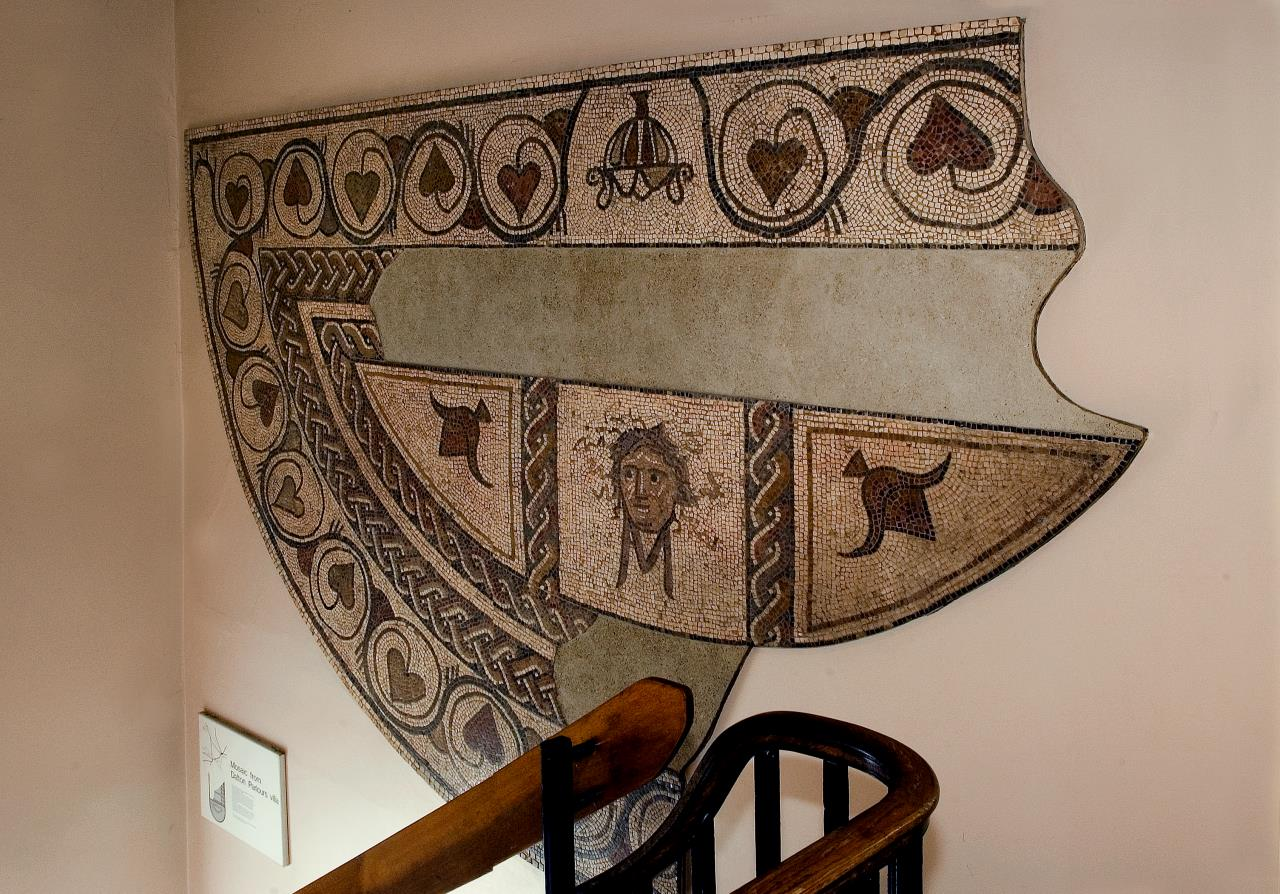
- The Dalton Parlours mosaic on display in the Yorkshire Museum

- Location within West Yorkshire

General information
- Architectural style: Romano-British Villa
- Location: Collingham, West Yorkshire, England, United Kingdom
- Construction started: c.4th century

Dalton Parlours Roman villa is a Roman villa and scheduled monument near Collingham, West Yorkshire.

== Discovery and excavation ==
The site was discovered in 1854 on land owned by the Lady Elizabeth Hastings Charities and excavated by F Carroll in 1855. These initial excavations located two buildings with hypocausts and the Medusa mosaic. A rescue excavation in 1977 excavated 3.5 acres (1.4 ha) of the site. The modern excavations discovered an Iron Age site beneath the Roman villa. The villa was constructed in the 3rd-century AD, though some evidence suggests 2nd-century activity at the site as well. Coins on the site date from AD 270–355. In the post-Roman period, several Anglo-Saxon buildings were built on the site (re-using the Roman building materials). A grave dating to the 7th-century AD was also found.

== The villa ==
There were several villa buildings built in a sequence at the site. The main site measures 30 m x 16 m and was aligned east to west. It comprised three rooms joined by a corridor. The eastern rooms had a hypocaust and the western room contained the Medusa mosaic. There was a separate bath-house located to the south of the main building. Several other buildings were present on the site.

=== Mosaic ===
The large mosaic depicting the Medusa was transferred to the Yorkshire Museum, where it was on display by 1881 in the Hospitium. The mosaic is currently on display in the museum, where it is affixed to a wall next to a staircase.
