= 1858 in archaeology =

Below are notable events in archaeology that occurred in 1838.

== Explorations ==
- February 2 - Systematic exploration of the prehistoric Swiss lake pile village of Wetzikon-Robenhausen by Jakob Messikommer begins.
- Désiré Charnay makes the first photographs of the Maya ruins of Palenque

== Finds ==
- Stone tools in a cave at Brixham in England.
- Hoard of Neolithic flint tools and weapons at York in England.
- Ancient Greek sculpture of the Lion of Knidos found by Richard Popplewell Pullan near modern-day Datça, Turkey.
- Stele of Ankh-ef-en-Khonsu at Dayr al-Bahri by François Auguste Ferdinand Mariette.
- Boston Green Head at the Serapeum of Saqqara (presumed year).
- In Luxor, Egypt, the Rhind papyrus is found (named for Alexander Henry Rhind, the discoverer; it is sometimes called the Ahmes papyrus for the scribe who wrote it around 1650 BC).
- December 31 - Roman coin hoard at Weston Underwood found in Buckinghamshire, England.

== Events ==
- George Rowell uses photography to document the reconstruction of the Saxon 'Brighthampton Urn' in the Ashmolean Museum, Oxford (England), the first known such use in archaeological conservation.

== Births ==
- Approximate date - Mary Brodrick, English Egyptologist (died 1933)

== Deaths ==
- February 6 - Georg Friedrich Creuzer, German Greek philologist and archaeologist (born 1771)

== Establishments ==
- Municipal museum of Saverne, France, established.

== See also ==
- List of years in archaeology
- 1857 in archaeology
- 1859 in archaeology
