= 1873 in archaeology =

Below are notable events in archaeology that occurred in 1873.

== Excavations ==
- January; November – George Smith sets out for excavations at Nineveh.

== Explorations ==
- May 29 – Deir ed-Darb, a first-century BCE monumental tomb from Second Temple Judea, is discovered in the Ottoman Syria Vilayet by a Royal Engineers soldier.
- Antonio García Cubas makes first scholarly description of the ruins of the Toltec capital in Tula, Hidalgo, Mexico.
- José Ramos Orihuela discovers the cave paintings in the Painted cave of Galdar ("Cueva Pintada") at Gáldar, Las Palmas, on Gran Canaria.

== Finds ==
- May 27 - German Classical archaeologist Heinrich Schliemann discovers "Priam's Treasure" at the presumed site of Troy in Anatolia.
- The Hiddensee treasure, a hoard of pendants and other gold jewellery from the time of Viking ruler Harald Bluetooth, is found on the German island of Hiddensee in the Baltic.
- Bharhut stupa is identified in India by Alexander Cunningham.

== Births ==
- June 29 - Leo Frobenius, German ethnologist (d. 1938)
- July 28 - John Winter Crowfoot, English educational administrator and archaeologist (d. 1959)

== See also ==
- Ancient Egypt / Egyptology
