= 1861 in archaeology =

Below are notable events in archaeology that occurred in 1861.

== Explorations ==
- First scientific investigations of Nalanda Mahavihara in Bihar.
- British archaeologist Alexander Cunningham identifies the ancient city of Vaishali with the present-day village of Basrah in Bihar.

== Excavations ==
- June - First modern excavation of the Neolithic chambered cairn and passage grave of Maeshowe on Orkney by James Farrer.
- Excavation of Long Hole Cave in Glamorgan reveals prehistoric flint artefacts.
- Excavation of Umm al-Amad, Lebanon, by Ernest Renan, abandoned when he finds that the ruins are only about two thousand years old.
- Excavation of Vergina by Leon Heuzey.

== Publications ==
- Edward Burnett Tylor - Anahuac: Or Mexico and the Mexicans, Ancient and Modern.

== Events ==
- Archaeological Survey of India founded.

== Births ==
- October 6 - Gaston Cros, French army officer and archaeologist (killed in action 1915)

== See also ==
- List of years in archaeology
- 1860 in archaeology
- 1862 in archaeology
