= 1860 in archaeology =

Below are notable events in archaeology that occurred in 1860.

== Explorations ==
- Ernest Renan visits the Roman temple of Bziza.

== Excavations ==
- Giuseppe Fiorelli takes charge of excavations at Pompeii.
- Ernest Renan makes excavations at Byblos.
- Excavation of Holyhead Mountain Hut Circles on Holy Island, Anglesey, off the coast of Wales.

== Finds ==
- Édouard Lartet discovers stone tools (of a type already found in England) at Aurignac.
- Cornet De Groot rediscovers Muara Takus Buddhist temple complex in Indonesia.
- Atalante Hermes from Atalante and Hermes of Aegium from Aegium in Greece.

== Publications ==
- Evans, John (January 1860). "On the Occurrence of Flint Implements in undisturbed Beds of Gravel, Sand, and Clay". Archaeologia. 38 (2). London: 280–307. doi:10.1017/s0261340900001454. Archived from the original on 2012-02-22.
- Prestwich, Joseph (January 1860). "On the Occurrence of Flint-implements, associated with the Remains of Animals of Extinct Species in Beds of a late Geological Period, in France at Amiens and Abbeville, and in England at Hoxne". Philosophical Transactions of the Royal Society. 150. London: 277–317. doi:10.1098/rstl.1860.0018. hdl:2027/chi.098241705. S2CID 111126826.

== Births ==
- July 15 - Max von Oppenheim, German Near Eastern archaeologist (d. 1946).
- November 8 - Francis J. Haverfield, English Romano-British archaeologist (d. 1919).

== See also ==
- List of years in archaeology
- 1859 in archaeology
- 1861 in archaeology
