= 1862 in archaeology =

Below are notable events in archaeology that occurred in 1862.

== Excavations ==
- Re-excavation of Snape Anglo-Saxon Cemetery in eastern England under direction of landowner Septimus Davidson; a ship burial is uncovered.

== Finds ==
- The Painted Cave of Galdar discovered at Gáldar, Las Palmas, on Gran Canaria.
- The Apollo Omphalos in Athens, Greece.

== Events ==
- Napoleon III establishes the National Archaeological Museum of France in the Château de Saint-Germain-en-Laye.

== Births ==
- May 27: Francis Llewellyn Griffith, British Egyptologist (died 1934)
- June 24: Arthur Bulleid, English archaeologist of the Somerset Levels (died 1951)
- October 26: Thomas J. Preston, Jr., American archaeologist (died 1955)
- November 26: Aurel Stein, Hungarian-born archaeologist (died 1943)

== See also ==
- List of years in archaeology
- 1861 in archaeology
- 1863 in archaeology
