= 1871 in archaeology =

Below are notable events in archaeology that occurred in 1871.

== Explorations ==
- Karl Mauch explores and describes the ruins of Great Zimbabwe.

== Excavations ==
- October 11 - Heinrich Schliemann begins his excavations of Troy.
- Hjalmar Stolpe begins his excavations of Birka.

== Publications ==
- Edward Burnett Tylor's anthropological text Primitive Culture.

== Finds ==
- Gezer discovered by Charles Simon Clermont-Ganneau.
- Hut on Novaya Zemlya used by Willem Barentsz's expedition is found by Norwegian seal hunter Elling Carlsen.

== Births ==
- October 11 - Harriet Boyd Hawes, American archaeologist of the Minoan civilization (died 1945)

== See also ==
- Ancient Egypt / Egyptology
