= 1859 in archaeology =

Below are notable events in archaeology that occurred in 1859.

== Excavations ==
- February – Excavation of Viroconium Cornoviorum (Wroxeter) under Thomas Wright begins.
- Excavation of Nydam Mose in Denmark under Conrad Engelhardt begins (continues to early 1864).
- Excavation of Camirus on Rhodes under Alfred Biliotti begins (continues to 1864).

== Finds ==
- Great Eleusinian Relief in Eleusis, Greece.
- Vigna Randanini Jewish catacombs in Rome.

== Publications ==
- J. M. García publishes an account of Monte Albán.
- Charles Roach Smith — Illustrations of Roman London.

== Miscellaneous ==
- 26 May & 2 June – Geologist Joseph Prestwich and amateur archaeologist John Evans report (to the Royal Society and Society of Antiquaries of London, respectively) the results of their investigations of gravel-pits in the Somme valley and elsewhere, extending human history back to what will become known as the Paleolithic Era.
- Imperial Archaeological Commission founded in Saint Petersburg.
- Royal Geographical Society is given a Royal Charter by Queen Victoria.

== Deaths ==
- 6 May: Alexander von Humboldt, explorer, writer

== See also ==
- Table of years in archaeology
- 1858 in archaeology
- 1860 in archaeology
