= 1870 in archaeology =

Below are notable events in archaeology that occurred in 1870.

== Excavations ==
- In Athens, Greece, the site of Kallimarmaron Stadium is excavated (later rebuilt to host the first modern olympics in 1896).
- In France, of the Grottes prehistoriques de Soyons (caves), the Trou du Mouton (Sheep's hole), Trou Roland, la Madeleine, and Trou du Renard (fox hole) are excavated by Lepic and De Lubac.

== Finds ==
- Spring – Torslunda plates discovered in Öland.
- First discoveries of the Polada culture.

== Institutions ==
- National Archaeological Museum (Florence) inaugurated.

== Publications ==
- Abraham de la Pryme (1671–1704) – The diary of Abraham de la Pryme, the Yorkshire antiquary. Publications of the Surtees Society, volume 54. Durham: Andrews and Company.

== Births ==
- Antonios Keramopoulos, Greek archaeologist (d. 1960)

== Deaths ==
- January 24 – John Howard Marsden, English archaeologist (b. 1803)

== See also ==
- Ancient Egypt / Egyptology
