= 1874 in archaeology =

Below are notable events in archaeology that occurred in 1874.

== Explorations ==
- William Henry Jackson of the Hayden Survey photographs the Mesa Verde cliff dwellings.

== Excavations ==
- Excavation of Eadgils' mound at Gamla Uppsala in Sweden.
- Excavation of Bharhut stupa in India by Alexander Cunningham.
- Excavations of Nineveh by George Smith for the British Museum conclude.

== Miscellaneous ==
- German Archaeological Institute at Athens established.

== Births ==
- March 9: Herbert Maryon, English sculptor, archaeologist and conservator (d. 1965)
- May 9: Howard Carter, English Egyptologist (d. 1939)

== See also ==
- Ancient Egypt / Egyptology
