= 1885 in archaeology =

List of years in archaeology	(table)
- … 1875; 1876; 1877; 1878; 1879; 1880; 1881; 1882; 1883; 1884; 1885; 1886; 1887; 1888; 1889; 1890; 1891; 1892; 1893; 1894; 1895 …
- In science 1882 1883 1884 1885 1886 1887 1888
- Art; Archaeology; Architecture; Literature; Music; Philosophy; Science; +...

Below are notable events in archaeology that occurred in 1885.

== Events ==
- The British School at Athens is established.

== Explorations ==
- Explorations continue in many places, from Latin America to Italy to Japan.

== Excavations ==
- At Ostia Antica (near Rome), the Quattro Tempietti (Four Small Temples) are excavated in 1885-1886 by R. Lanciani (The square in front is excavated in 1911-1915 by D. Vaglieri and R. Paribeni).
- On the outskirts of Rome, Italy, the ruins of the Temple of Diana at Nemi are excavated by British Ambassador Lord John Savile of Rufford Abbey.
- In Wales, at Ffynnon Beuno Cave, Tremeirchion, Denbighshire, the cave complex is excavated: occupational evidence includes Aurignacian and proto-Solutrean flint work plus Pleistocene fauna (Palaeolithic, Old Stone Age).
- In Japan, the Katsutachi Pit is excavated in 1885 (Meiji 18) under the leadership of Takuma Dan, an American-trained engineer.
- At Susa, Marcel-Auguste Dieulafoy and Jane Dieulafoy begin French excavations.
- At Eleusis (southern Greece), about half the fragments of the Lacrateides Relief are unearthed near the Plutonium.

== Publications ==
- Désiré Charnay's account of his explorations in Mesoamerica, Les Anciennes Villes du Nouveau Monde, published in Paris.
- William Collings Lukis –
  - Prehistoric Stone Monuments of the British Isles: Cornwall with 40 tinted litho plates, accurately drawn to scale by W. C. Lukis and W. C. Borlase, published by the Society of Antiquaries.
  - "Report of survey of certain megalithic monuments in Scotland, Cumberland and Westmoreland, executed in summer 1884". Proceedings of the Society of Antiquaries pp. 302–11.
- American Journal of Archaeology first published.

== Births ==
- September 13: John Beazley, British Classical archaeologist (d. 1970)
- October 29: Alfred V. Kidder, American archaeologist (d. 1963)
