= 1884 in archaeology =

List of years in archaeology	(table)
- … 1874; 1875; 1876; 1877; 1878; 1879; 1880; 1881; 1882; 1883; 1884; 1885; 1886; 1887; 1888; 1889; 1890; 1891; 1892; 1893; 1894 …
- In science 1881 1882 1883 1884 1885 1886 1887
- Art; Archaeology; Architecture; Literature; Music; Philosophy; Science; +...

Below are notable events in archaeology that occurred in 1884.

== Explorations ==
- Rev. William Collings Lukis and Sir Henry Dryden, Bart., survey megalithic monuments in Scotland, Cumberland and Westmoreland.

== Excavations ==
- October – Augustus Pitt Rivers begins excavation of the Romano-British settlement site on Woodcutts Common, on his Cranborne Chase estate in Dorset.
- Tanis, Egypt: the first excavation conducted by Flinders Petrie.
- Excavations at the Oracle of Apollo on Ptoion are begun by the French School at Athens.

== Finds ==
- Winter – First burials of the Remedello culture.
- Hittites' script identified on a monument at Boğazkale discovered by William Wright.

== Institutions ==
- Pitt Rivers Museum established by donation of Augustus Pitt Rivers' anthropological and archaeological collections to the University of Oxford.
- Museum of Archaeology and Anthropology established at the University of Cambridge, opening as the Cambridge Antiquarian Library and Museum.

== Publications ==
- François Lenormant – La Genèse traduite d'après l'hébreu, avec distinction des éléments constitutifs du texte, suivi d‘un essai de restitution des textes dont s'est servi le dernier rédacteur (Paris).

== Births ==
- January 26 – Roy Chapman Andrews, American explorer (d. 1960).
- February 1 – Herbert Eustis Winlock, American Egyptologist who worked for the New York Metropolitan Museum of Art (d. 1950)
- July 25 – Davidson Black, Canadian paleoanthropologist (d. 1934)
