= 1888 in archaeology =

List of years in archaeology	(table)
- … 1878; 1879; 1880; 1881; 1882; 1883; 1884; 1885; 1886; 1887; 1888; 1889; 1890; 1891; 1892; 1893; 1894; 1895; 1896; 1897; 1898 …
- In science 1885 1886 1887 1888 1889 1890 1891
- Art; Archaeology; Architecture; Literature; Music; Philosophy; Science; +...

Below are notable events in archaeology that occurred in 1888.

== Explorations ==
- Chaco Canyon is surveyed and photographed by Victor and Cosmos Mindeleff of the Bureau of American Ethnology.
- Heinrich Schliemann attempts to locate the tomb of Alexander the Great in Alexandria, but is denied permission to excavate.

== Excavations ==
- May 22 - Augustus Pitt Rivers begins excavation of Bokerly Dyke.
- Excavations of Hawara in Egypt by Flinders Petrie, finds including papyri containing parts of Homer's Iliad (the "Hawara Homer"), and the Fayum mummy portraits.
- Excavations of Nippur sponsored by the University of Pennsylvania begin (continues through 1900).
- Excavations of the Cadmea (Καδμεία, citadel) in Thebes, Greece, by the German Archaeological Institute at Athens begin.
- Carl Humann directs new excavations in Sam'al and a trial excavation in Tralles (modern Aydın).

== Finds ==
- December 18 - Discovery of three villages by Richard Wetherill and his brother-in-law Charlie Mason while tracking stray cattle: Cliff Palace, Spruce Tree House, and Square Tower House; now part of Mesa Verde National Park.
- Llantwit Major Roman Villa.
- The Mourning Athena relief is found near the Acropolis of Athens.

== Publications ==
- American Anthropologist journal is founded.
- Archibald Sayce, The Hittites: The Story of a Forgotten Empire.

== Miscellaneous ==
- January 13 - National Geographic Society formed in the United States.

== Births ==
- February 1 - Gertrude Caton Thompson, English archaeologist of Africa (d. 1985)
- August 16 - T. E. Lawrence, British archaeologist of the Middle East, military officer, diplomat and author (d. 1935)
- October 6 - Birger Nerman, Swedish archaeologist (d. 1971)

== Deaths ==
- March 10 - Lucy Wright Mitchell, American archaeologist (b. 1845)
