= 1889 in archaeology =

List of years in archaeology	(table)
- … 1879; 1880; 1881; 1882; 1883; 1884; 1885; 1886; 1887; 1888; 1889; 1890; 1891; 1892; 1893; 1894; 1895; 1896; 1897; 1898; 1899 …
- In science 1886 1887 1888 1889 1890 1891 1892
- Art; Archaeology; Architecture; Literature; Music; Philosophy; Science; +...

Below are notable events in archaeology that occurred in 1889.

== Excavations ==
- Early excavations at Lindholm Høje.
- Birka female Viking warrior in Sweden.
- Excavations in Plataea by the American School of Classical Studies at Athens begin.

== Finds ==
- October – Folkton Drums (decorated Neolithic chalk cylinders) found in a barrow in Yorkshire, England.
- Tauroctony found in Walbrook adjacent to the site of the London Mithraeum.

== Births ==
- January 22 – Umberto Zanotti Bianco, Italian archaeologist, environmentalist and senator (d. 1963)
- July 18 – Axel Boëthius, Swedish-born archaeologist of Etruscan culture (d. 1969)
- August 5 – Rhys Carpenter, American Classical art historian (d. 1980)
- December 1 – Alexander Keiller, Scottish archaeologist of Avebury (d. 1955)
