= 1882 in archaeology =

List of years in archaeology	(table)
- … 1872; 1873; 1874; 1875; 1876; 1877; 1878; 1879; 1880; 1881; 1882; 1883; 1884; 1885; 1886; 1887; 1888; 1889; 1890; 1891; 1892 …
- In science 1879 1880 1881 1882 1883 1884 1885
- Art; Archaeology; Architecture; Literature; Music; Philosophy; Science; +...

Below are notable events in archaeology that occurred in 1882.

== Explorations ==
- Expeditions led by Alfred Maudslay and Désiré Charnay independently arrive at the Maya site of Yaxchilan.
- Nature of site at Heuneburg identified by Eduard Paulus.

== Excavations ==
- Carl Humann works at Smyrna (with Alfred von Domaszewski) on behalf of the Prussian Academy of Sciences and at Sam'al for the Deutsche Morgenländische Gesellschaft.
- Gaston Maspero first excavates at Lisht in Egypt, including the Pyramid of Amenemhet I.
- Panagiotis Stamatakis begins excavation of the group tomb of the warriors from Thespiae who fell in the Battle of Delium (424 BCE) in Boeotia.
- Eugène Eschassériaux excavates le camp Thénac Peu-Richard in France.
- The Archaeological Society of Athens, along with Demetrios Philios and Wilhelm Dörpfeld, begins excavation of Eleusis.

== Publications ==
- Robert Munro – Ancient Scottish Lake Dwellings or Crannogs.

== Finds ==
- Vače situla

== Miscellaneous ==
- The Egypt Exploration Fund is set up in the UK by Amelia Edwards and Reginald Stuart Poole.
- The Ancient Monuments Protection Act is passed in the United Kingdom and establishes protection of ancient monuments. General Pitt-Rivers is appointed the first Inspector of Ancient Monuments.
