= 1891 in archaeology =

List of years in archaeology	(table)
- … 1881; 1882; 1883; 1884; 1885; 1886; 1887; 1888; 1889; 1890; 1891; 1892; 1893; 1894; 1895; 1896; 1897; 1898; 1899; 1900; 1901 …
- In science 1888 1889 1890 1891 1892 1893 1894
- Art; Archaeology; Architecture; Literature; Music; Philosophy; Science; +...

Below are notable events in archaeology that occurred in 1891.

== Explorations ==
- Brahmagiri first explored by Benjamin L. Rice.

== Excavations ==
- Peabody Museum (Harvard) - Harvard University project at Copan begins.
- Flinders Petrie works on the temple of Aten at Tell-el-Amarna, discovering a 300-square-foot (28 m^{2}) New Kingdom painted pavement.
- J. Theodore Bent works at Great Zimbabwe.

== Finds ==
- May 28 - Gundestrup cauldron, found in Himmerland, Denmark.

== Paleontology ==
- October - Eugène Dubois finds the first fragmentary bones of Pithecanthropus erectus (later redesignated Homo erectus), or 'Java Man', at Trinil on the Solo River.
- The Saqqara Bird.

== Publications ==
- Coins of Ancient India by Sir Alexander Cunningham.
- Dorset Ooser first published.
