= 1897 in archaeology =

List of years in archaeology	(table)
- … 1887; 1888; 1889; 1890; 1891; 1892; 1893; 1894; 1895; 1896; 1897; 1898; 1899; 1900; 1901; 1902; 1903; 1904; 1905; 1906; 1907 …
- In science 1894 1895 1896 1897 1898 1899 1900
- Art; Archaeology; Architecture; Literature; Music; Philosophy; Science; +...

Below are notable events in archaeology that occurred in 1897.

== Explorations ==
- Rudolf Ernst Brünnow and Alfred von Domaszewski begin a two-year expedition to the Arabian Peninsula, including Petra.

== Excavations ==
- Excavation of Glastonbury Lake Village by Arthur Bulleid and Harold St George Gray begins.
- Maud Cunnington carries out her first excavations in the Devizes area of England.
- Excavation of the first Mycenaean chamber tombs in Kolonaki at Thebes, Greece, by Dimitrios Filios.
- Excavation of Nekhen in Egypt begins (continues to 1899).
- Excavation of Susa in Iran by a French expedition led by Jacques de Morgan begins (continues to 1911).

== Finds ==
- May - Yde Girl, a bog body, is discovered in the village of Yde, The Netherlands.
- August 4 - The "Lady of Elche" Iberian sculpture (4th century BCE) is found at L'Alcúdia near Elche in Spain.
- Coligny calendar.
- Alekanovo inscription.
- Silver and gold tubes of the Maykop culture from a burial mound in Armenia, interpreted in 2022 as drinking straws for communal beer consumption.

== Events ==
- February 18 - Conclusion of the Benin Expedition of 1897, leading to the Benin Bronzes being carried off to London.

== Publications ==
- William Copeland Borlase - The Dolmens of Ireland: their distribution, structural characteristics, and affinities in other countries, together with the folklore attaching to them; supplemented by considerations on the anthropology, ethnology, and traditions of the Irish people (3 vols, London).

== Births ==
- June 1 - Yang Zhongjian, father of Chinese vertebrate paleontology (d. 1979).
- August 21 - Victor Erle Nash-Williams, Welsh archaeologist (d. 1955).
- October 30 - Einar Gjerstad, Swedish archaeologist of the ancient Mediterranean (d. 1988).

== Deaths ==
- May 5 - James Theodore Bent, English explorer, archaeologist and author (b. 1852).
- May 21 - Augustus Wollaston Franks, English antiquarian (b. 1826).
