= 1956 in archaeology =

The year 1956 in archaeology involved some significant events.

== Excavations ==
- Large University of Pennsylvania project at Tikal begins.
- Excavations of the Neolithic settlement at Argissa Magoula in Thessaly by Vladimir Milojčić of the University of Heidelberg begin (continue to 1958).
- Excavations of the Danubian Neolithic settlement at Bylany in Bohemia begin.
- Excavations at Brahmagiri.
- Excavations at Teppe Hasanlu begin (continue to 1974).
- Systematic excavation of Diolkos in Greece by Nikolaos Verdelis begins (continues to 1962).
- Excavations at Longbridge Deverill Cow Down in the United Kingdom under the direction of Sonia Chadwick for the Ministry of Works (continues to 1960).

== Publications ==
- Documents in Mycenaean Greek by Michael Ventris and John Chadwick; documenting decipherment of Linear B writing.

== Finds ==
- Anders Franzén locates the Swedish warship Vasa, sunk on her maiden voyage in 1628, in Stockholm harbor.
- K. M. A. Barnett discovers Lo Ah Tsai Stone Circle on Lamma Island in Hong Kong.

== Events ==
- W. F. Grimes succeeds V. Gordon Childe as director of the University of London Institute of Archaeology.

== Births ==
- March 24 - Alanah Woody, American archaeologist (d. 2007).
- April 30 - Antonio Sagona, Australian archaeologist (d. 2017).
- Yosef Garfinkel, Israeli archaeologist.

== Deaths ==
- June 6 - Hiram Bingham III, American rediscoverer of Machu Picchu (b. 1875).
- September 6 - Michael Ventris, English co-decipherer of Linear B (car accident) (b. 1922).
- September 12 - John Garstang, English archaeologist of the Near East (in Beirut) (b. 1876).
- November 9 - Alan Wace, English archaeologist who worked on Linear B (b. 1879).
