= 1730s in archaeology =

List of years in archaeology	(table)
- … 1720; 1721; 1722; 1723; 1724; 1725; 1726; 1727; 1728; 1729; 1730; 1731; 1732; 1733; 1734; 1735; 1736; 1737; 1738; 1739; 1740 …
- In science 1727 1728 1729 1730 1731 1732 1733
- Art; Archaeology; Architecture; Literature; Music; Philosophy; Science; +...

The decade of the 1730s in archaeology involved some significant events.

== Excavations ==
- Formal excavations continue at Pompeii.

== Finds ==
- 1738: First formal excavations of Herculaneum, by Roque Joaquín de Alcubierre sponsored by Charles III of Spain

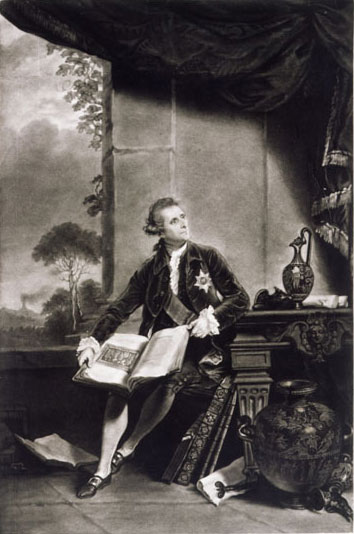
1730: William Hamilton.

== Publications ==
- 1732: John Horsley - Britannia Romana (posthumous).
- 1735: Prospero Alpini - Historiæ Ægypti Naturalis (posthumous).
- 1736: Francis Drake - Eboracum (Roman York)

== Other events ==
- 1731: December 8 - Antiquarian John Freeman buries a 'time capsule' in the grounds of his house at Fawley Court in England.
- 1734: November 12 - Nicholas Mahudel reads a paper to the Académie des inscriptions et belles-lettres on Three Successive Ages of Stone, Bronze, and Iron, introducing the concept of the Stone, Bronze and Iron Ages.

== Births ==
- 1730: September 16 - William Hamilton, Scottish diplomat, antiquarian, archaeologist and volcanologist (d. 1803)
- 1732: Luigi Lanzi, Italian archaeologist (d. 1810)
- 1735: August 8 - Jérémie Jacques Oberlin, Alsatian archaeologist (d. 1806)

== Deaths ==
- 1732: January 12 - John Horsley, British archaeologist (b. c.1685)

Preceded by 1720s in archaeology	Archaeology timeline 1730s	Succeeded by 1740s in archaeology
