= 1970 in archaeology =

== Explorations ==
- Historic American Engineering Record surveys the original main line of the Baltimore and Ohio Railroad.

== Excavations ==
- June - Wreck of Spanish Armada ship El Gran Grifón off Fair Isle excavated by Colin Martin and Sydney Wignall.
- Joint British Museum, Harvard University and University of Cambridge project begins at Maya site of Lubaantun under leadership of Norman Hammond.
- Five-year project at Altun Ha, led by Dr. David Pendergast of the Royal Ontario Museum, ends.
- Retrieval of artefacts from wreck of Batavia off Western Australia begins.
- Joint Archaeological Survey of India and University of Cambridge excavations at Malvan in Gujarat.
- Alepotrypa cave in Greece.

== Publications ==
- P. V. Glob - Hojfolket: Bronzealderens mennesker bevaret i 3000 år (The Mound People: Danish bronze-age man preserved).

== Finds ==
- July - Heilongjiang hand cannon, dating from c. 1288, discovered by Wei Guozhong in Manchuria.
- October 21 - Loose timber from the wreck of the Tudor warship Mary Rose found in the Solent off the coast of England.
- October 25 - Submarine CSS H. L. Hunley (sunk in action 1864) is claimed to be located in Charleston Harbor, South Carolina, by E. Lee Spence.
- First Botorrita plaque.
- Sweet Track discovered by John Sweet in the Somerset Levels of England.
- Blackfriars Ships III and IV discovered by Peter Marsden in London.
- Buckquoy spindle-whorl, dating from the Early Middle Ages, probably the 8th century, excavated in Buckquoy, Birsay, Orkney, Scotland; notable because of its Ogham inscription.

== Events ==
- July 12 - Thor Heyerdahl's papyrus boat Ra II arrives in Barbados after a 57-day voyage from Morocco.
- Butser Ancient Farm set up as an experimental archaeology site by the Council for British Archaeology.

== Births ==
- March 9 – Fereidoun Biglari, Iranian archaeologist and museum curator

== Deaths ==
- May 6 - Sir John Beazley, British Classical archaeologist (b. 1885)
- May 29 - Jaroslav Černý, Czech-British Egyptologist (b. 1898)

== See also ==
- List of years in archaeology
- 1969 in archaeology
- 1971 in archaeology
