= 1960 in archaeology =

- 1780s ^{.} 1790s in archaeology ^{.} 1800
- Other events: 1790s ^{.} Archaeology timeline

== Excavations ==
- "Cave of Letters" at Nahal Hever in the Judaean Desert.
- Fishbourne Roman Palace, West Sussex.
- Floors excavated at the Una Vida great house, Chaco Canyon.
- Cape Gelidonya shipwreck excavation, by Peter Throckmorton, George F. Bass and Frédéric Dumas, begins.
- August: Excavations at Castle Tower, Penmaen, in Wales begin, led by Leslie Alcock of University College Cardiff. Further small-scale work is undertaken at the site the following year and the results published in 1966.

== Publications ==
- Glyn Daniel - The Prehistoric Chamber Tombs of France.

== Finds ==
- Helge Ingstad and Anne Stine Ingstad find apparent Viking site at L'Anse aux Meadows in Newfoundland.
- Tomb of Princess Yongtai found in Qianling Mausoleum, China.
- Azykh Cave is discovered by Mammadali Huseynov in Azerbaijan.
- Statue of Athena Demegorusa in Nicopolis, western Greece.
- November 4 - OH 7, first fragments of Homo habilis, discovered by Jonathan Leakey at Olduvai Gorge, Tanzania.

== Events ==
- Chemical tests indicate that the Etruscan terracotta warriors in the Metropolitan Museum of Art, New York, are modern fakes.

== Births ==
- April 21 - Nicholas Thomas, Australian-born British archaeologist of Oceania
- May 11 - Pál Sümegi, Hungarian geoarchaeologist
- September 1 - Eric H. Cline, American Classical archaeologist
- Timothy Taylor, English archaeologist

== Deaths ==
- February 20 - Leonard Woolley, English archaeologist (b. 1880)
- March 11 - Roy Chapman Andrews, American explorer (b. 1884)
- May 13 - Antonios Keramopoulos, Greek archaeologist (b. 1870)
- October 6 - Karel Absolon, Czech archaeologist (b. 1877)

== See also ==
- List of years in archaeology
- 1959 in archaeology
- 1961 in archaeology
