= 1940 in archaeology =

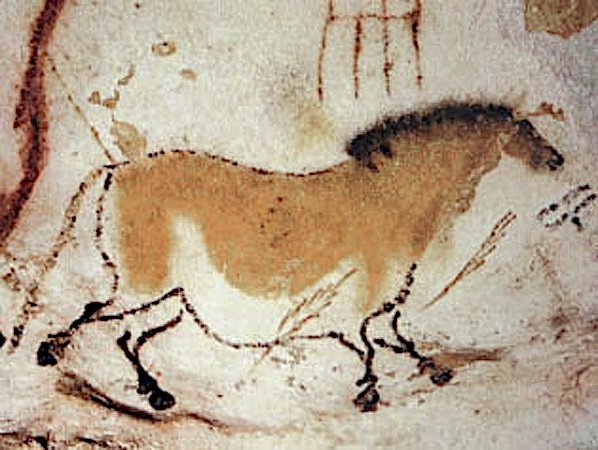
Image of a horse from the Lascaux caves made by the Cro-Magnon peoples at their hunting route in the Stone age

Below are notable events in archaeology that occurred in 1940.

== Excavations ==
- Start of excavations at Tell Uqair by Iraqi Directorate General of Antiquities (Seton Lloyd, Taha Baqir and Fuad Safar).
- Start of excavations at Ahichatra.
- Start of excavations in the Vatican Necropolis.
- Excavations at Brahmagiri by M. H. Krishna of the Mysore state Archaeological Department.

== Publications ==
- Gisela M. A. Richter - Handbook of the Etruscan Collection (Metropolitan Museum of Art).

== Finds ==
- September 12 - Lascaux caves. Painted c. 15,000 BC - 13,000 BC. Closed to the public in 1963.
- After ten-year expedition at Tanis, "Silver Pharaoh" tomb uncovered by Pierre Montet. It is the first ever intact tomb found.
- Ferriby Boat 2 discovered by Ted Wright.
- Balline Hoard in Ireland.

== Births ==
- October 14 - Ruth Tringham, Neolithic household and feminist archaeologist.

== Deaths ==
- February 26 - John Lamplugh Kirk, British archaeologist, collector and museum curator (b. 1869)
- April 25 - Wilhelm Dörpfeld, German archaeologist of Troy (b. 1853)
- June 27 - Harry Burton, English archaeological photographer, known for his photos of the excavation of Tutankhamun's tomb (b. 1879).

== See also ==
- List of years in archaeology
- 1939 in archaeology
- 1941 in archaeology
