= 1814 in archaeology =

The year 1814 in archaeology involved some significant events.

== Explorations ==
- Stamford Raffles becomes the first European to explore Borobudur in Central Java.

== Excavations ==
- Colosseum, Rome: The arena substructure is partly excavated during 1810-1814.

== Finds ==
- Kritonios Crown is found in Armento, Italy.

== Births ==
- 23 January: Alexander Cunningham, father of the Archaeological Survey of India (d. 1893)
- 2 September: Ernst Curtius, conducted archaeological research in the late 19th century; primarily interested in Greek archaeology (d. 1896)

== See also ==
- Roman Forum - excavations.
