= 1975 in science =

List of years in science	(table)
- … 1965; 1966; 1967; 1968; 1969; 1970; 1971; 1972; 1973; 1974; 1975; 1976; 1977; 1978; 1979; 1980; 1981; 1982; 1983; 1984; 1985 …
- Art; Archaeology; Architecture; Literature; Music; Philosophy; Science; +...

The year 1975 in science and technology involved some significant events, listed below.

== Astronomy and space exploration ==
- April 19 – Aryabhata, India's first satellite, is launched using Soviet boosters.
- July 17 – Apollo–Soyuz Test Project: An American Apollo and a Soviet Soyuz spacecraft dock with each other in orbit marking the first such link-up between spacecraft from the two nations.
- August 20 – Viking program: NASA launches the Viking 1 planetary probe toward Mars.

== Biology ==
- August 7 – César Milstein and Georges Köhler report their discovery of how to use hybridoma cells to isolate monoclonal antibodies, effectively beginning the history of monoclonal antibody use in science.
- Living specimens of the Chacoan Peccary (Catagonus wagneri), previously known only from fossils, are identified in Paraguay.

== Climatology ==
- August 8 – The term global warming is probably first used in its modern sense by Wallace Smith Broecker.

== Computer science ==
- January – Altair 8800 is released, sparking the era of the microcomputer.
- March 5 – Hackers in Silicon Valley hold the first meeting of the Homebrew Computer Club.
- April 4 – Bill Gates and Paul Allen form a company at this time called Micro-Soft in Albuquerque, New Mexico, to develop and sell their Altair BASIC interpreter software for the Altair 8800.
- The MOS Technology 6502 is introduced. An 8-bit microprocessor designed by a small team led by Chuck Peddle for MOS Technology, it is, by a considerable margin, the least expensive full-featured microprocessor on the market.

== Mathematics ==
- Benoit Mandelbrot coins the term fractal.
- The Harada–Norton group is discovered.
- John N. Mather and Richard McGehee prove that for the Newtonian collinear four-body problem there exist solutions which become unbounded in a finite time interval.
- The Monty Hall problem in probability is first posed, by Steve Selvin.

== Medicine ==
- October 16 – The last naturally occurring case of smallpox is diagnosed and treated, the victim being two-year-old Rahima Banu in Bangladesh.
- Lyme disease first recognised at Lyme, Connecticut.
- Mini–mental state examination (MMSE) or Folstein test introduced to screen for dementia or other cognitive dysfunction.

== Technology ==
- Steven Sasson of Eastman Kodak in the United States produces the first self-contained (portable) digital camera.

== Awards ==
- Nobel Prizes
  - Physics – Aage Bohr, Ben Roy Mottelson, James Rainwater
  - Chemistry – John Warcup Cornforth, Vladimir Prelog
  - Medicine – David Baltimore, Renato Dulbecco, Howard Martin Temin
- Turing Award – Allen Newell, Herbert A. Simon

== Births ==
- July 11 – Naomi McClure-Griffiths, American-born astrophysicist.
- July 17 – Terence Tao, Australian-born mathematician.
- November 14 – Martin Hairer, Swiss-born Austrian-British mathematician.
- Catherine A. Lozupone, American microbiologist.

== Deaths ==
- February 8 – Sir Robert Robinson b. 1886), British chemist, Nobel Prize laureate
- February 10 – Elizabeth Kozlova (b. 1892), Russian ornithologist
- February 14 – Sir Julian Huxley (b. 1887), English biologist and author.
- April 19 – Percy Lavon Julian (b. 1899), African American research chemist.
- May 14 – Ernst Alexanderson (b. 1878), Swedish American television pioneer.
- May 18 – Christopher Strachey (b. 1916), English computer scientist.
- June 8 – Douglas Guthrie (b. 1885), Scottish otolaryngologist and medical historian.
- June 27 – Sir Geoffrey Taylor (b. 1886), English physicist.
- September 5 – Alice Catherine Evans (b. 1881), American microbiologist.
- October 10 – August Dvorak (b. 1894), American educational psychologist.
- October 23 – Gordon Hamilton Fairley (b. 1930), British oncologist.
- November – Priscilla Fairfield Bok (b. 1896), American astronomer.
- November 19 – Tokushichi Mishima (b. 1893), Japanese inventor and metallurgist.
- December 13 – Mary Locke Petermann (b. 1908), American cellular biochemist.
- December 28 – Frances McConnell-Mills (b. 1900), American toxicologist.
