= 1957 in archaeology =

The year 1957 in archaeology involved some significant events.

== Explorations ==
- Minaret of Jam site in Afghanistan surveyed by André Maricq, Gaston Wiet and Ahmed Ali Kohzad.

== Excavations ==
- August–September - Chestnuts Long Barrow, one of the Medway Megaliths in south-east England.
- So-called 'mound of Midas', the Great Tumulus near Gordium.
- Monastic cell on Iona believed to belong to Columba, by Charles Thomas.
- 1957–1960 - James Mellaart at Hacılar Höyük.
- 1957–1961 - Ralph Solecki at Shanidar, Iraq.

== Publications ==
- Medieval Archaeology the journal of the Society for Medieval Archaeology first published.

== Finds ==
- January - Relics of HMS Bounty off Pitcairn Island by Luis Marden.
- Right arm of Laocoön and His Sons
- Sperlonga sculptures.
- Ban Chiang.
- Maine penny.

== Miscellaneous ==
- Society for Medieval Archaeology established in the United Kingdom.

== Births ==
- October 21 - Julian Cope, English post-punk singer-songwriter and antiquarian
- November 28 - Judith McKenzie, Australian archaeologist (d. 2019)

== Deaths ==
- May 12 - J. F. S. Stone, British archaeologist. (b. 1891)
- October 19 - V. Gordon Childe, Australian prehistorian of Europe (b. 1892)
- November 9 - Alan Wace, English Classical archaeologist (b. 1879)
- November 28 - O. G. S. Crawford, British archaeologist (b. 1866)
- Grace Mary Crowfoot, English textile archaeologist (b. 1879)
