= 1650s in archaeology =

List of years in archaeology	(table)
- … 1640; 1641; 1642; 1643; 1644; 1645; 1646; 1647; 1648; 1649; 1650; 1651; 1652; 1653; 1654; 1655; 1656; 1657; 1658; 1659; 1660 …
- In science 1647 1648 1649 1650 1651 1652 1653
- Art; Archaeology; Architecture; Literature; Music; Philosophy; Science; +...

The decade of the 1650s in archaeology involved some significant events.

== Publications ==
- 1655: William Dugdale - Monasticon Anglicanum begins publication.
- 1656: William Dugdale - Antiquities of Warwickshire.
- 1658: Thomas Browne - Hydriotaphia, Urn Burial, or a Discourse of the Sepulchral Urns lately found in Norfolk.

== Deaths ==
- 1652: 8 October - John Greaves, English mathematician, astronomer and antiquary (b. 1602)

Preceded by 1640s in archaeology	Archaeology timeline 1650s	Succeeded by 1660s in archaeology
