= 1955 in archaeology =

The year 1955 in archaeology involved some significant events.

== Explorations ==
- Thor Heyerdahl organizes the Norwegian Archaeological Expedition to Easter Island (continues to 1956).
- Start of extensive discoveries at the Anglo-Saxon cemetery on Loveden Hill in Lincolnshire, England.

== Excavations ==
- September - Gustav Riek begins systematic excavations at Brillenhöhle (continues to 1963).
- A. C. O'Dell begins excavations on St Ninian's Isle (continues to 1958).
- Alexander Sahinian begins excavations at Etchmiadzin Cathedral in Armenia (continues to 1956).
- A. Ledyard Smith makes the first archaeological investigation of the Mayan site of Chutixtiox in Guatemala.
- Archaeological Survey of India begins excavations at Nagda chalcolithic site (continues to 1957).
- A Hebrew University team led by Yigal Yadin begins excavations at Tel Hazor (continues to 1958).
- Excavation of Qujialing culture type site in China begins (continues to 1957).

== Publications ==
- Cyril Fox - Offa's Dyke: a Field Survey of the Western Frontier Works of Mercia in the Seventh and Eighth Centuries AD.
- Ivan D. Margary - Roman Roads in Britain, vol. 1.
- I. A. Richmond - Roman Britain (Penguin Books).

== Finds ==
- May 19 - Greenock Coin Hoard in Scotland.
- Pesse canoe, the oldest known boat, in the Netherlands.
- First remains of Paranthropus boisei — teeth of Olduvai Hominin (OH) 3 — unearthed in Olduvai Gorge, Tanzania.

== Miscellaneous ==
- The components of a large Statue of Ramesses II from Memphis, Egypt, are moved to a central Cairo location and re-erected.
- October - The term "Industrial archaeology" is popularised.

== Births ==
- January 1 - Mary Beard, English Classicist.
- April 20 - Svante Pääbo, Swedish paleogeneticist.
- September 30 - Martin Millett, English Classical archaeologist.

== Deaths ==
- January 1 - Arthur C. Parker, part-Seneca American archaeologist and ethnographer of Native Americans in the United States (b. 1881).
- March 31 - Thomas Dunbabin, Australian-born Classical archaeologist and Greek Resistance leader (b. 1911).
- August 17 - Edward Thurlow Leeds, English archaeologist of the Anglo-Saxons (b. 1877).
- October 29 - Alexander Keiller, British archaeologist and benefactor (b. 1889).
- December 15 - V. E. Nash-Williams, Welsh archaeologist (b. 1897).
- December 25 - Thomas J. Preston, Jr., American archaeologist (b. 1862).
