= 1770s in archaeology =

The decade of the 1770s in archaeology involved some significant events.

== Explorations ==
- 1773: Don Ramon de Ordoñez y Aguilar examines the ruins of Palenque and sends a report to the Captain General at Antigua Guatemala.
- 1777: The ruins of Xochicalco described by explorer Antonio Alzate.

== Excavations ==
- 1776: October - Vertical shaft sunk at Silbury Hill.
- Formal excavations continue at Pompeii.

== Finds ==
- 1774: Discovery of reputed Roman Baths, Strand Lane, London.
- c.1779: Bronze Age shield found in a peat bog at Beith in Scotland.

== Publications ==
- 1774: Don Bernardo Miera y Pacheco identifies the Chaco Canyon area as "Chaca" on a map. The term, a Spanish translation of a Navajo word, is thought to be the origin for "Chacra Mesa" and "Chaco".
- 1775: Memoire sur Venus, by Pierre Henri Larcher.

== Other events ==
- 1772: The British Museum acquires its first antiquities of note, Sir William Hamilton's collection of ancient Greek vases.
- 1774: May 2 - The Society of Antiquaries of London open the coffin of King Edward I.
- 1777: National Archaeological Museum, Naples, established.

== Births ==
- 1771: March 10 - Georg Friedrich Creuzer, German Greek philologist and archaeologist (d. 1858)
- 1773: June 13 - Thomas Young, English Egyptologist (d. 1829)
- 1774: June 10 - Carl Haller von Hallerstein, German Greek archaeologist (d. 1817)
- 1776
  - January 4 - Bernardino Drovetti, Italian antiquarian and Egyptologist (d. 1852)
  - March 12 - Lady Hester Stanhope, English archaeologist (d. 1839)
- 1778: November 5 - Giovanni Battista Belzoni, Italian explorer and Egyptologist (d. 1823)
- 1779: May 29 - John Disney, English barrister, antiquarian and archaeological benefactor (d. 1857)

== Deaths ==
- 1771 Francis Drake (b. 1696)

Preceded by 1760s in archaeology	Archaeology timeline 1770s	Succeeded by 1780s in archaeology
