= 1922 in archaeology =

Below are notable events in archaeology that occurred in 1922.

== Excavations ==
- September - Excavations at Coldrum Long Barrow in southeast England resumed by architect E. W. Filkins.
- November 4 - Howard Carter discovers the tomb of Tutankhamun. He opens it in the presence of George Herbert, 5th Earl of Carnarvon, and Carnarvon's daughter, Lady Evelyn Beauchamp, on November 26. Many associated artifacts are found, including Tutankhamun's funerary mask and six chariots.
- First excavations of Neolithic remains at Windmill Hill, Avebury, England.
- Excavations at Ur by the British Museum and the University of Pennsylvania led by Leonard Woolley begin.
- Excavations at Euphrates, site of Dura-Europos, by Franz Cumont.
- Excavations at the Temple of Olympian Zeus (Athens).
- Excavations at Sutton Courtenay Anglo-Saxon village in England by Edward Thurlow Leeds.

== Explorations ==
- Aerial survey of archaeological sites in south western England by Alexander Keiller and O. G. S. Crawford.
- Mohenjo-daro rediscovered by Rakhaldas Bandyopadhyay of the Archaeological Survey of India.

== Finds ==
- July 11 - Tomb of Julia Velva in the English city of York (Eboracum).
- Venus of Lespugue.

== Publications ==
- Alfred Watkins - Early British Trackways.

== Births ==
- March 31 - Richard Daugherty, American archaeologist (d. 2014)
- July 12 - Michael Ventris, English co-decipherer of Linear B (d. 1956).
- August 3 - Su Bai, Chinese archaeologist of Buddhist grottoes (d. 2018)
- November 19 - Yuri Knorozov, Russian epigrapher of Maya hieroglyphics (d. 1999).
- Kim Won-yong, "doyen of Korean archaeology" and Seoul National University professor (d. 1993).

== Deaths ==
- November 23 - Eduard Seler, German Mesoamericanist (born 1849).

== See also ==
- List of years in archaeology
