= 1853 in archaeology =

Below are notable events in archaeology that occurred in 1853.

== Explorations ==
- Alexander Cunningham examines and describes the ruins at Harappa in the Punjab
- John Thurnam begins investigating tumuli around Knap Hill in Wiltshire, England

== Finds ==
- Hormuzd Rassam excavates the clay tablets which will be deciphered as Epic of Gilgamesh
- Winter 1853–54 – Archaeologist Ferdinand Keller identifies the remains of the Meilen–Rorenhaab site, first of the prehistoric pile dwellings around Lake Zurich to be located.

== Births ==
- June 3 – Flinders Petrie, English Egyptologist (d. 1942)
- December 26 – Wilhelm Dörpfeld, German architect and archaeologist (d. 1940)

== Deaths ==
- June 8 – Howard Vyse, English soldier and Egyptologist (b. 1784)
- November 5 – Charles Masson, English soldier, explorer of Buddhist sites and numismatist (b. 1800)

== See also ==
- List of years in archaeology
- 1852 in archaeology
- 1854 in archaeology
