= 1892 in science =

List of years in science	(table)
- … 1882; 1883; 1884; 1885; 1886; 1887; 1888; 1889; 1890; 1891; 1892; 1893; 1894; 1895; 1896; 1897; 1898; 1899; 1900; 1901; 1902 …
- Art; Archaeology; Architecture; Literature; Music; Philosophy; Science; +...

The year 1892 in science and technology involved some significant events, listed below.

== Astronomy ==
- September 9 – At Lick Observatory, Edward Emerson Barnard discovers Amalthea, the third moon of Jupiter and the last natural satellite found by direct visual observation.
- La planète Mars et ses conditions d'habitabilité, by Camille Flammarion, director of the Paris Observatory, argues that the Martian canals are artificial.

== Biology ==
- Viruses are first described by Russian–Ukrainian biologist Dmitri Ivanovsky.
- The microbial agent responsible for influenza is incorrectly identified by R. F. J. Pfeiffer as the bacteria species Haemophilus influenzae.

== Chemistry ==
- approx. date – James Dewar invents the Dewar flask.

== Environment ==
- May 28 – Scottish American naturalist John Muir founds the environmental organization the Sierra Club in San Francisco, aided by a group of professors from the University of California, Berkeley, and Stanford University.
- American environmental chemist Ellen Swallow Richards, in a lecture in Boston, calls for the "christening of a new science" – oekology, to embrace environmental education and consumer nutrition.

== Geography ==
- November – Traveller Isabella Bird becomes the first woman inducted as a Fellow of the Royal Geographical Society in Britain.

== Mathematics ==
- Georg Cantor shows there are different kinds of infinity and studies transfinite numbers.
- Gino Fano discovers the Fano plane.

== Medicine ==
- July 18 – Russian-born bacteriologist Waldemar Haffkine demonstrates the first anti-cholera vaccine.
- German pathologist Curt Schimmelbusch proposes that medical dressings should be sterilized daily prior to surgery and designs a form of autoclave to facilitate this.
- Czech neurologist Arnold Pick identifies the clinical syndrome of Pick's disease and the Pick bodies that characterise the frontotemporal lobe disorder.
- Johann von Mikulicz-Radecki first describes Sjögren syndrome.
- First edition of William Osler's textbook The Principles and Practice of Medicine, designed for the use of practitioners and students of medicine is published in Edinburgh while the author is Professor of Medicine at Johns Hopkins University. It remains internationally significant in medical education for forty years.

== Psychology ==
- July – The American Psychological Association is founded.

== Technology ==
- February 2 – William Painter obtains a patent for the crown cork bottle cap.
- February 23 – Rudolf Diesel obtains a patent for a compression-ignition engine.
- March 15 – Jesse W. Reno patents the first escalator at Coney Beach in the United States.
- François Hennebique patents his system of reinforced concrete.

== Publications ==
- Brothers Richard and Cherry Kearton publish With Nature and a Camera in the United Kingdom, the first nature book illustrated entirely from photographs.

== Awards ==
- Copley Medal: Rudolf Virchow
- Wollaston Medal for geology: Ferdinand von Richthofen

== Births ==
- January 1 – Guido Fanconi (died 1979), Swiss pediatrician.
- March 30 – Stefan Banach (died 1945), Polish mathematician.
- April 14 – Karl Wilhelm Reinmuth (died 1979), German astronomer.
- May 3 – George Paget Thomson (died 1975), English atomic physicist, recipient of the Nobel Prize in Physics (1937).
- July 24 – Alice Ball (died 1916), African American chemist.
- July 25 – Hugh Llewellyn Glyn Hughes (died 1973), South African-born military physician.
- August 15 – Louis-Victor de Broglie (died 1987), French recipient of the Nobel Prize in Physics (1929).
- August 19 – Elizabeth Kozlova (died 1975), Russian ornithologist
- August 26
  - Elizebeth Smith Friedman (died 1980), American cryptanalyst.
  - Emanuel Miller (died 1970), British child psychiatrist.
- September 6 – Edward Victor Appleton (died 1965), English radiophysicist, recipient of the Nobel Prize in Physics (1947).
- October 26 – André Chapelon (died 1978), French steam locomotive designer.
- November 5 – J. B. S. Haldane (died 1964), British geneticist.
- November 21 – Margery C. Carlson (died 1985), American botanist.
- December 12 – Herman Potočnik (Noordung) (died 1929), Slovene pioneer of astronautics and cosmonautics.

== Deaths ==
- January 2 – George Biddell Airy (born 1801), English astronomer royal.
- January 21 – John Couch Adams (born 1819), English mathematician.
- March 29 – Sir William Bowman, 1st Baronet (born 1816), English ophthalmologist, histologist and anatomist.
- April 2 – Emin Pasha (born 1840), Silesian Jewish Ottoman explorer.
- May 5 – August Wilhelm von Hofmann (born 1818), German chemist
- June 27 – Carl Schorlemmer (born 1834), German organic chemist.
- December 6 – Werner von Siemens (born 1816), German electrical engineer.
- December 18 – Richard Owen (born 1804), English anatomist and paleontologist.
