= 1816 in archaeology =

The year 1816 in archaeology involved some significant events.

== Excavations ==
- March - The stupa at Amaravathi village, Guntur district, is recorded and excavated by Colin Mackenzie.
- The North Leigh Roman Villa, in Oxfordshire is extensively excavated between 1813 and 1816, when its plan is recovered and interior features are reported.
- Giovanni Battista Caviglia begins work at Giza Necropolis.

== Events ==
- Christian Jürgensen Thomsen is appointed curator of the collections of the Museum of Northern Antiquities in Copenhagen, where he begins to organize them according to the three-age system.
- The Elgin Marbles are purchased by the British government from Thomas Bruce, 7th Earl of Elgin, for the British Museum in London.

== Births ==
- September 16 - Charles Thomas Newton, English Classical archaeologist (d. 1894).
- November 24 - Llewellynn Jewitt, British archaeologist, illustrator and natural scientist (d. 1886).
