= 1740s in archaeology =

The decade of the 1740s in archaeology involved some significant events.

== Excavations ==
- 1748: Jeong Ji-hae, a Yangban and father of the Governor of Jinju, excavates six Goryeo Dynasty (AD 918-1392) tombs of individuals whom Jeong thought may have been his ancestors, and thus becomes the first archaeologist in Korea.

== Finds ==
- 1743: The Barkway hoard of Roman objects is found in Hertfordshire, England.
- 1747: The mummified remains known as "Amcotts Moor Woman", a bog body, is unearthed from a peat bog in Lincolnshire, England.
- 1747: Substantial remains of the Temple of Apollo are discovered in Mdina, Malta. Many of the ruins are dispersed among private collections.
- 1747: Capheaton Treasure, a Roman silver hoard, is found in Northumberland, England. Some of it is melted down.
- 1748: Pompeii rediscovered as the result of formal excavations by Spanish military engineer Rocque Joaquin de Alcubierre.
- 1749: Stabiae rediscovered by Joaquin de Alcubierre.

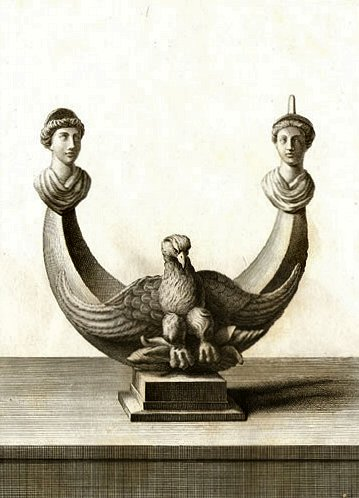
Elaborate oil lamp from Herculaneum, as depicted in Le Antichità di Ercolano (1744).

== Publications ==
- 1740:
  - Nicholas Mahudel's Les Monumens les plus anciens de l'industrie des hommes, des Arts et reconnus dans les pierres de Foudres, by the Académie des inscriptions et belles-lettres.
  - William Stukeley's description of Stonehenge.
- 1744: First volume of Le Antichità di Ercolano, account of discoveries at Herculaneum.

== Other events ==
- 1743: The Papenbroek Collection is bequeathed to Leiden University, comprising about 150 antiquities. It is put on public display and published in 1746, but poorly cared for until it gets an official curator, half a century later.

== Births ==
- 1743: November 23 - Théophile Corret de la Tour d'Auvergne, French antiquary (d. 1800)

== Deaths ==
- 1747: March 7 - Nicholas Mahudel, French antiquary (b. 1704)

== See also ==
- Archaeology timeline

Preceded by 1730s in archaeology	Archaeology timeline 1740s	Succeeded by 1750s in archaeology
