= 1826 in archaeology =

1826 in archaeology.

== Excavations ==
- Preliminary excavations at Harappa in British India by Daya Ram Sahni.

== Finds ==
- Possible date - Discovery of Hunterston Brooch in Scotland.

== Births ==
- March 20 - Augustus Wollaston Franks, English antiquarian (died 1897)

== Deaths ==
- March 10 - John Pinkerton, Scottish-born antiquarian (born 1758)
