= 1963 in archaeology =

The year 1963 in archaeology involved some significant events.

== Explorations ==
- Exploration of Geissenklösterle caves and Ice Age Art in the Swabian Jura begins.

== Excavations ==
- Excavation of Eshmun Temple by Maurice Dunand begins (continues into the 1970s).
- Excavation of Masada by Yigael Yadin begins (continues until 1965).
- Excavation of Tel Arad by Yohanan Aharoni (continues until 1967).
- Excavation at Monkwearmouth–Jarrow Abbey by Rosemary Cramp (continues until 1978).
- Recovery of silver rupees minted by Aurangzeb from a shipwreck off Ceylon by Arthur C. Clarke and associates.

== Finds ==
- April 13 - Dutch East India Company ship Vergulde Draeck wrecked in 1656 off Western Australia.
- September - Hinton St Mary Mosaic in England.
- Warrior of Hirschlanden.
- Hal Ball spots Maya site of Altun Ha from the air.
- Neolithic site of Göbekli Tepe in Turkey.
- Ferriby Boat 3 found by Ted Wright. The boat is at least 4,000 years old and dates back to the Bronze Age. It is thought to be the oldest Bronze Age boat found in Western Europe.
- First Mesolithic Holmegaard bow found in Denmark.
- 8th century BCE shrine discovered at Tel Arad
- The remains of a colossal statue of Hadrian in Athens, Greece.

== Events ==
- April 1 - Industrial Monuments Survey for the Ministry of Public Building and Works (Great Britain) commenced by Rex Wailes.
- Lascaux caves closed to the public. (Painted c.15000–13000 BC; discovered in 1940.)
- First County Archaeologist appointed in England, B.J.N. (Ben) Edwards in Lancashire.

== Publications ==
- Kenneth Hudson - Industrial Archaeology: an introduction.
- Charles Green - Sutton Hoo: The Excavation of a Royal Ship-Burial.

== Births ==
- November 29: Peter N. Peregrine, American archaeologist.
- November 30: Carenza Lewis, English archaeologist.

== Deaths ==
- February 28: Harold St George Gray, English archaeologist (b. 1872).
- June 11: Alfred V. Kidder, American archaeologist (b. 1885).
- June 23: Frans Blom, Danish Mayanist (b. 1893).
- August 28: Umberto Zanotti Bianco, Italian archaeologist, environmentalist and senator (b. 1889).
- September 16: Winifred Lamb, English archaeologist (b. 1894).
- November 13: Margaret Murray, Anglo-Indian Egyptologist (b. 1863).
- December 19: Sir Alan Gardiner, English Egyptologist (b. 1879).
