= Tiara of Saitaferne =

Forged gold tiara

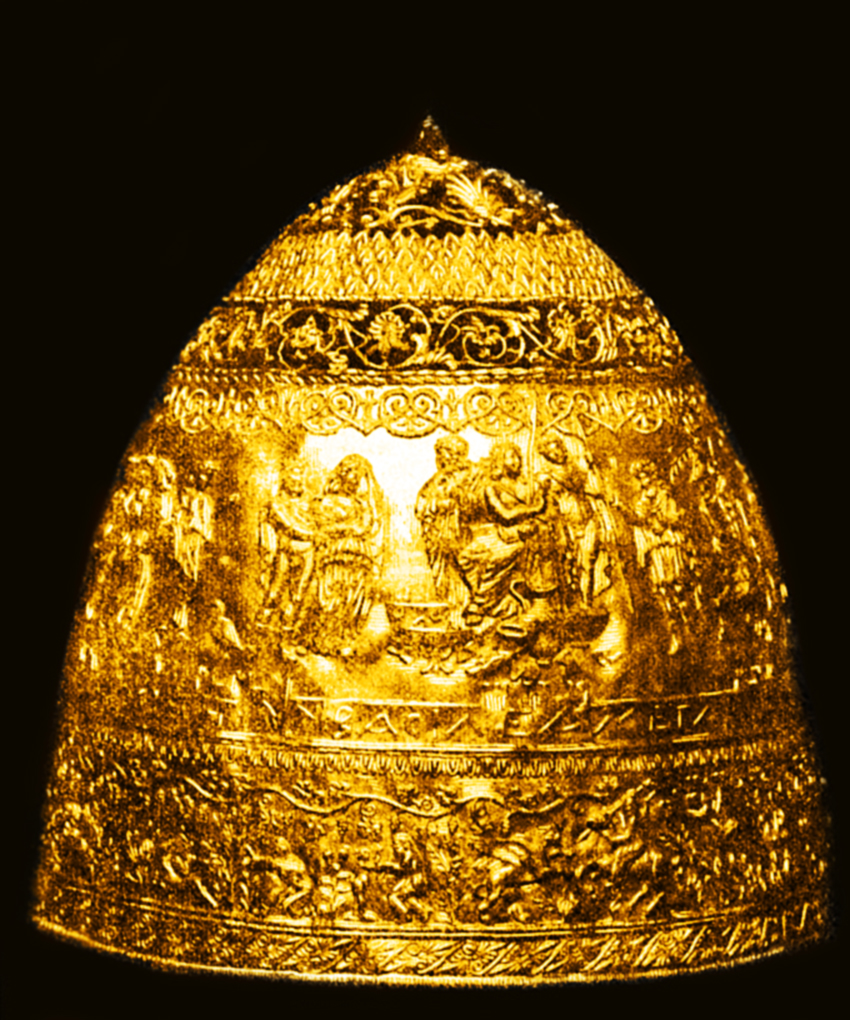
Tiara of Saitaferne

The Tiara of Saitaferne (also Saitaphernes or Saitapharnes) is a tiara in gold sheet, acquired by the Louvre in 1896, afterwards demonstrated to be fake by its creator, Israel Rouchomovsky.

== History ==
On April 1, 1896, the Louvre announced that it had purchased a gold tiara that had belonged to the Scythian king Saitapharnes. The museum had purchased the artifact for 200,000 gold French francs. A Greek inscription on the tiara read "The council and citizens of Olbia honor the great and invincible King Saitapharnes". To the experts at the Louvre, the tiara confirmed an episode dating to the late 3rd-century BCE or early 2nd-century BCE. According to the story, Saitapharnes had besieged the Greek colony of Olbia and was convinced to leave the city in peace only through the offering of expensive gifts.

Shortly after the Louvre exhibited the tiara, a number of experts challenged its authenticity. Among them was the German archaeologist Adolf Furtwängler who noted many stylistic problems with the tiara's design and questioned the lack of aging apparent on the artifact. For several years, the Louvre defended the authenticity of its treasure and even prepared a magnificent book on the treasure. Eventually, news of the story reached Odesa.

In 1894, two years before the Louvre acquisition, two dealers, Schapschelle Hochmann and his brother Leiba, had commissioned Israel Rouchomovsky, a skilled goldsmith from Odesa, to make the tiara. They let him believe that it was intended as a gift for an archaeologist friend and provided Rouchomovsky with details from recent excavations to aid his design. It wasn't until news of the Louvre scandal reached him that Rouchomovsky learned of the fate of his creation. He traveled to Paris in 1903 and presented himself as the maker of the tiara. Experts at the museum refused to believe him until he demonstrated the ability to reproduce a portion of the crown. Embarrassed, the museum hid the object away in storage. The Louvre had been fooled in one of the greatest archeological scandals of the century; Rouchomovsky, on the other hand, became famous for his work and earned a gold medal at the Paris Salon of Decorative Arts. He lived in Paris until his death in 1934.

In 1954, the tiara was included in a "Salon of Fakes" at the Louvre. In 1997, the Israel Museum in Jerusalem borrowed the Tiara of Saitapharnes from the Louvre for an exhibition on Israel Rouchomovsky. In 2009, the High Museum of Art in Atlanta borrowed the tiara for a Louvre exhibition. In 2014, a memorial plaque was unveiled on the wall of Rouchomovsky's workshop in Odesa where the tiara was created. The "LWL-Museum für Archäologie" in Herne, Germany borrowed the tiara for the opening weeks of their new exhibition Irrtümer & Fälschungen der Archäologie (English: Errors & Forgeries in Archaeology) in March 2018.

A copy of the tiara is on display in the British Museum. As of 2009, another was on display at the Tel Aviv Museum of Art.
