= 1817 in archaeology =

The year 1817 in archaeology involved some significant events.

== Events ==
- The Elgin Marbles go on display in the British Museum in London.
- Stamford Raffles publishes The History of Java.

== Explorations ==
- Giovanni Battista Belzoni travels extensively through Egypt, visiting Abu Simbel, Karnak and the Valley of the Kings, creating several excavation sites.
- Major Stephen H. Long commands an expedition exploring the southern part of Arkansas, as well as the Louisiana border of the Red River; he also explores the Wisconsin River to its headwaters and the Mississippi River to the Falls of Saint Anthony.

== Excavations ==
- October - The KV16 burial site of Ramesses I in the East Valley of the Kings is discovered and excavated by Giovanni Battista Belzoni.
- Near Cairo, the Great Sphinx of Giza is excavated to chest level by Giovanni Battista Caviglia.
- Giovanni Battista Belzoni clears the Great Temple of Abu Simbel of sand.
- The tophet in Carthage is first excavated; since then, hundreds of urns and stelae (engraved stones) have been recovered.

== Finds ==
- January 1 - Sailing through the Sandwich Islands, Otto von Kotzebue discovers New Year Island.
- October - Giovanni Battista Belzoni finds the tomb and sarcophagus of Seti I.
- October 9 - The KV21 burial site in the Valley of the Kings is discovered by Giovanni Battista Belzoni.
- October 10 - The KV16 burial site of Ramesses I in the East Valley of the Kings is discovered by Giovanni Battista Belzoni.
- November 22 - Frédéric Cailliaud discovers the old Roman Mons Smaragdus emerald mines at Sikait, Egypt.

== Births ==
- Henry Syer Cuming, antiquarian, collector and secretary of the British Archaeological Association (d. 1902)
- March 5 - Austen Henry Layard, French-born British archaeologist of Iran (d. 1894)

== Deaths ==
- November 5 - Carl Haller von Hallerstein, German archaeologist of Greece (b. 1774)
