= 1808 in archaeology =

Karl Ludwig Fernow (1763–1808)

The year 1808 CE in archaeology included many events, some of which are listed below.

== Events ==
- January 12 – John Rennie's scheme to defend St Mary's Church, Reculver, in the south east of England, founded in 669, from coastal erosion is abandoned in favour of demolition, despite the church being an exemplar of Anglo-Saxon architecture and sculpture.

== Publications ==
- Nummi aegyptii imperatorii, by Jörgen Zoega.

== Births ==
- January 22 – James Fergusson, Scottish-born antiquarian, architect and merchant (d. 1886)

== Deaths ==
- December 4 – Karl Ludwig Fernow, German art critic and archaeologist (b. 1763)
