= Alanah Woody =

American anthropologist

- Born: March 24, 1956; Central Valley, California, United States
- Died: July 19, 2007 (aged 51)

Academic background
- Education: University of Nevada, Reno; University of Southampton

Academic work
- Discipline: Archaeologist; Anthropologist
- Sub-discipline: Nevada Rock Art
- Institutions: Nevada Rock Art Foundation
- Main interests: Native American rock art

Alanah Woody (March 24, 1956 – July 19, 2007) was an American archeologist, anthropologist, professor and executive director of the Nevada Rock Art Foundation, which she co-founded. She was considered an expert in Native American rock art, such as pictographs and petroglyphs, especially in Nevada, and championed their protection.

== Life and work ==
Woody was born in California's Central Valley to a father who was a hard-rock miner and a homemaker mother. Her father worked on water tunnels and large construction projects, which caused her family to move often, including to Pakistan, where she lived from the ages of 5 to 13.

At the University of Nevada, Reno, she earned her bachelor’s and master’s degrees in anthropology and then went on to receive her doctorate in archeology from the University of Southampton in England (2000).

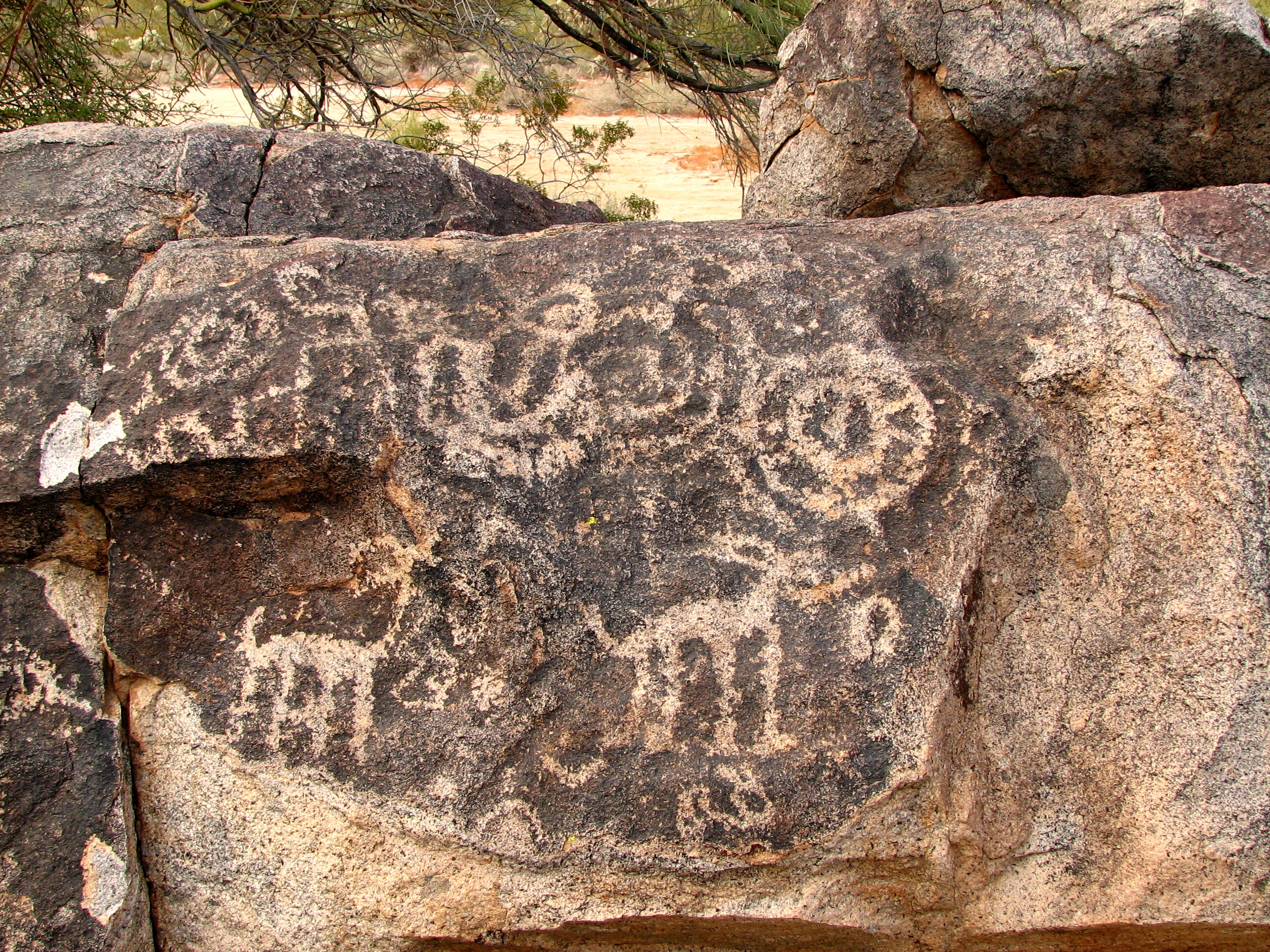
Example of petroglyph (found in Arizona)

Woody helped found the Nevada Rock Art Foundation a year after earning her doctorate to begin documentation of art carvings in Nevada rocks. To do so, she taught "an army of volunteers" the value of photography, scale drawings and GPS data when recording their findings.

She managed the anthropology collections at the Nevada State Museum in Carson City, and taught anthropology and archaeology at the University of Nevada, Reno.

Woody received a Nevada Historic Preservation Award for her ancient heritage preservation work.
