= 1889 in philosophy =

== Births ==
- January 1 - Götz Briefs (died 1974)
- February 8 - Fritz Heinemann (died 1970)
- February 22 - R. G. Collingwood (died 1943)
- March 1 - Tetsuro Watsuji (died 1960)
- April 14 - Arnold J. Toynbee (died 1975)
- April 26 - Ludwig Wittgenstein (died 1951)
- June 1 - Charles Kay Ogden (died 1957)
- July 26 - Tadeusz Czeżowski (died 1981)
- September 4 - Moses Schönfinkel (died 1942)
- September 5 - Oskar Becker (died 1964)
- September 26 - Martin Heidegger (died 1976)
- October 12 - Erich Przywara (died 1972)
- October 12 - Dietrich von Hildebrand (died 1977)
- December 7 - Gabriel Marcel (died 1973)

== Deaths ==
- October 17 - Nikolay Chernyshevsky (born 1828)
- December 23 - Constance Naden (born 1858)
