= 1810 in archaeology =

The year 1810 in archaeology involved some significant events.

== Excavations ==
- Colosseum, Rome: The arena substructure is partly excavated during 1810-1814.
- Stonehenge, Wiltshire, England: Second excavations by William Cunnington and Richard Colt Hoare.

== Publications ==
- Alexander von Humboldt publishes illustrated accounts of Pre-Columbian ruins of Mesoamerica including Mitla and Xochicalco.
- Richard Colt Hoare begins publication of The Ancient History of Wiltshire in England.

== Births ==
- 11 April: Henry Rawlinson, English Assyriologist (d. 1895).
- 26 July: Henry Christy, English ethnologist, archaeologist and sponsor (d. 1865).

== Deaths ==
- 30 March: Luigi Lanzi, Italian archaeologist (b 1732).
- 31 December: William Cunnington, English antiquarian (b. 1754).

== See also ==
- Roman Forum - excavations
