= Archaeology of Greece =

The archaeology of Greece includes artificial remains, geographical landscapes, architectural remains, and biofacts (artefacts that were once living organisms). The history of Greece as a country and region is believed to have begun roughly 2.5- 1.5 million years ago when members of the genus Homo first colonized Eurasia. From the first colonization, Greek history follows a sequential pattern of development alike to the rest of Europe. Neolithic, Bronze, Iron and Classical Greece are highlights of the Greek archaeological record, with an array of archaeological finds relevant to these periods.

== Paleolithic Greece ==
Hunter-gatherers of Greece inhabited the region during the Middle Paleolithic Age (55,000–30,000 BC). Franchthi cave, an archaeological site in Southern Greece, has uncovered evidence which demonstrates people hunting small and large game, gathering wild cereals and fishing in coastal waters, following the Ice Age.

== Neolithic Greece ==
Succeeding the hunter-gatherers of prehistoric Greece is the Neolithic period (6500–3000 BC). This period saw the beginning of agriculture and the domestication of livestock; archaeological remains of farming settlements are evident in tells (mounds composed of mudbrick used in the construction of houses) that protrude from the landscape. Tells are formed through remains of older structures being built upon with new structures; they dominate the Neolithic archaeological record in Greece as the Neolithic period saw to the introduction of agriculture and firmer community and settlement patterns.

The beginning of agriculture within Greece is believed to have been a transition influenced by newcomers from western Anatolia. With human colonization occurring outside of Anatolia and the Levant, Greece was affected in economic and material means, adopting the structure of economic and material culture from Near Eastern neighbours. Northern Greece is home to Thessaly, where the majority of archaeological remains and information relevant to the Neolithic period of Greek history has been uncovered; around 120 sites, mostly tells, have been excavated in the whole of Thessaly. The region provides evidence of having been a significant agricultural centre with soils ideal for cultivation, and this evidence is further demonstrated in the number of tells and mounds bearing evidence of farming settlements within Thessaly. One tell that has been uncovered in Thessaly is Sesklo and comprises both a large lower town called a Polis, and a small upper town called an Acropolis; together the two sections of the settlement cover 13 ha of land. The houses within the acropolis of Sesklo were detached and spacious, compared to the houses within the polis, which formed tighter clusters over a larger space of land.

Following the Last Ice Age, archaeological remains of the period disappeared due to the rising sea levels. Natural geological processes, such as glacial periods and interglacial periods, have inhibited archaeologists from uncovering material from Neolithic Greece through the destruction or consumption of archaeological remains Archaeologists use the European record as a whole, in order to understand more on this period of Greek history. Although the extremities of the environment have led to archaeological challenges, there have been discoveries relevant to the Neolithic period of the region.

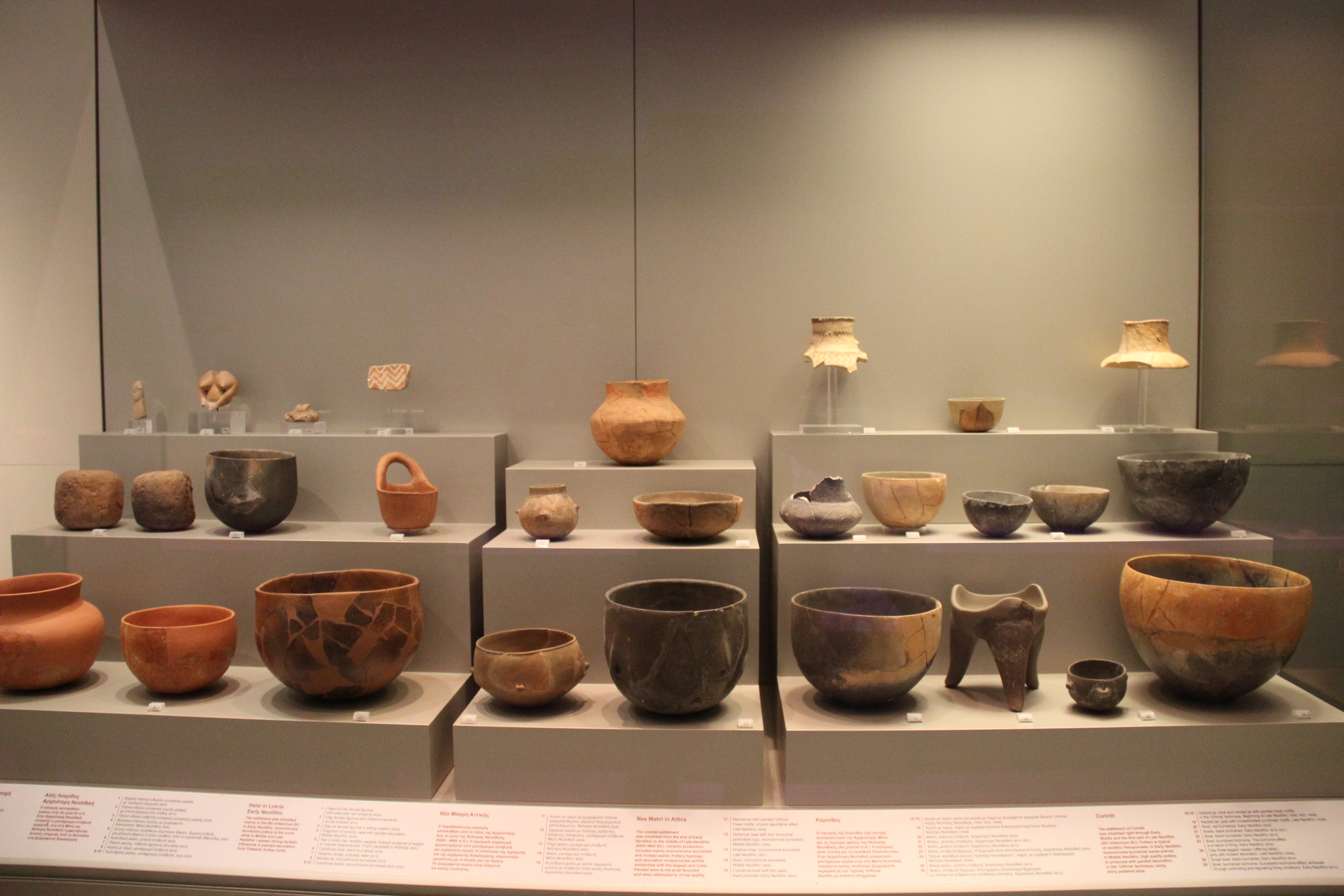
Neolithic pottery from Ancient Greece

=== Pottery ===
Following the introduction of agriculture, Neolithic Greece saw its first wave of Pottery; the vessels that have been uncovered are thus assumed to have been used for cooking, eating and storing the crop yields of farming settlements. Early Neolithic pottery shows no sign of burning (indicating food was instead cooked directly over a fire) and are simple in shape. Pottery of Middle Neolithic Greece does show signs of being used over a fire. Middle and Late Neolithic Greece shows signs of design transformation for pottery with more elaborately decorated tableware; an example of this 'new' pottery is Middle Neolithic Sesklo Ware (red geometric designs on a pale background).

Pottery differs within regions of Greece but has also shown close links between regions and within close communities; similar shapes and styles of pottery from the Neolithic period have been uncovered in differing regions of Thessaly and the Peloponnese region.

== Bronze Age Greece ==
Archaeology of Bronze Age Greece prominently features remains of two main civilizations that existed during the three thousand years from Early to Late Bronze Age Greece.

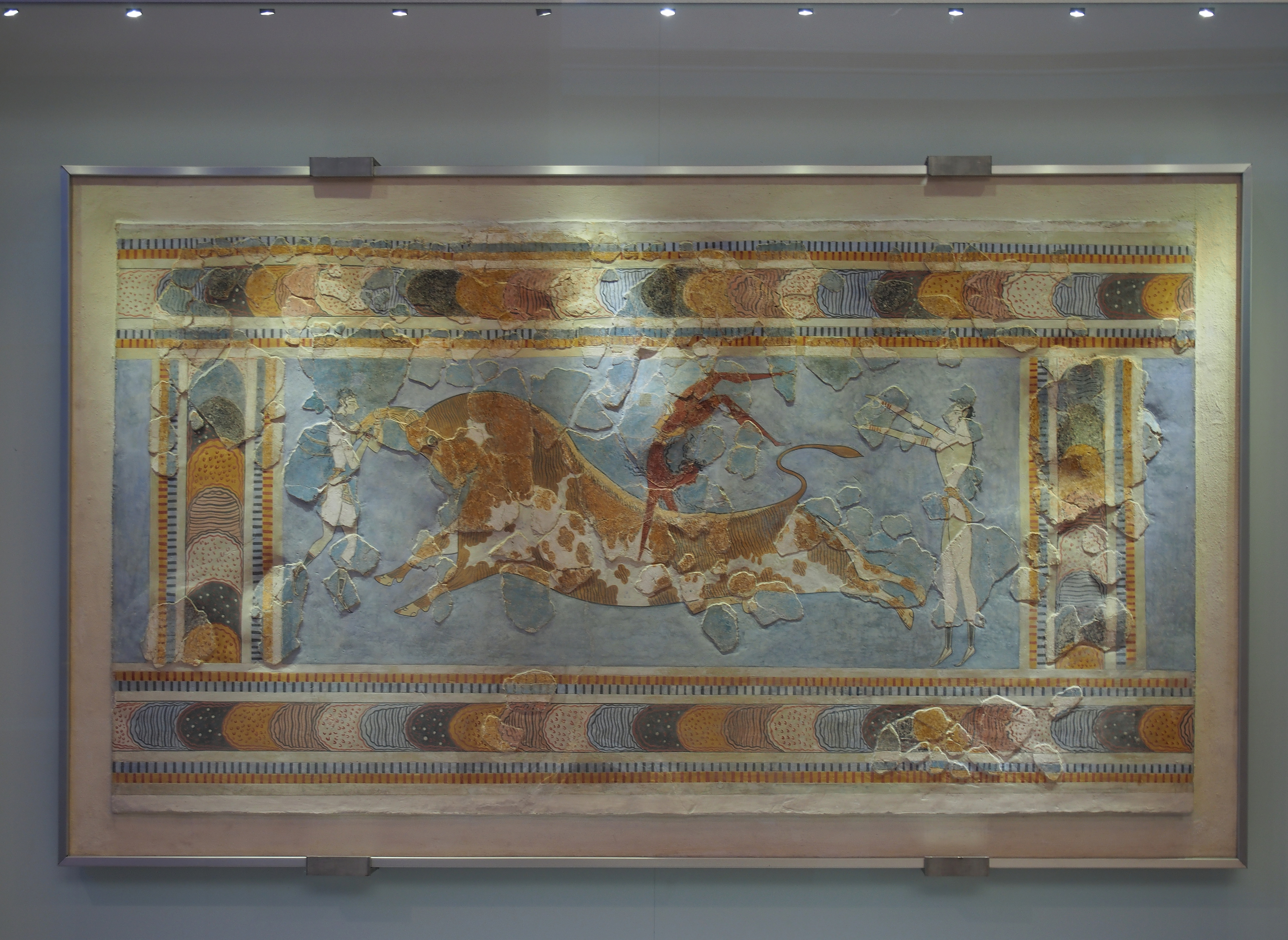
The Bull-leaping fresco found in the Palace of Knossos on the island of Crete. It is now being displayed in the Heraklion Archaeological Museum, Greece.

=== The Minoan civilization ===
The Minoan civilization was one of the first group of people to form a community and operate in a democratic and economical manner within the geography of the Aegean Islands of Greece, and the continent of Europe. British archaeologist, Sir Arthur Evans, who was first to excavate the Palace of Knossos in the 1900s, uncovered much information relevant to the Minoan archaeological record. The Palace of Knossos is an archaeological site belonging to the Minoan civilization along with smaller palaces of Zakros and Phaistos.

==== Palaces ====
Palaces of the Minoan period were multi-functional; they were the religious, economic and political administrative centres for the whole of the Minoan society. Basic palace structures consisted of a Central court, which was the main focus of the palace, where most theatrical and political events took place. The Central court is also believed to be the room where the cultural or religious activity of bull-leaping, which is depicted in the Bull-leaping Fresco located in the Palace of Knossos on Crete, took place. Other rooms within the basic palace structure consisted of residential quarters, workshops and crafts rooms, storerooms for surplus foodstuffs, and rooms for religious practice.

=== The Mycenaean civilization ===
The Mycenaean civilization succeeded that of the Minoan civilization and resided on mainland Greece. Prominent sites include Mycenae, Pylos, and Argos. The Palace of Pylos in Messenia has contributed a significant amount of Linear B tablets to the archaeological record of the Mycenaeans; it has also revealed evidence of a previous settlement area surrounding the palace, through a survey of the site. The Shaft Graves in Mycenae are also an archaeological discovery relevant to the Mycenaean period; it took place in the 1870s.

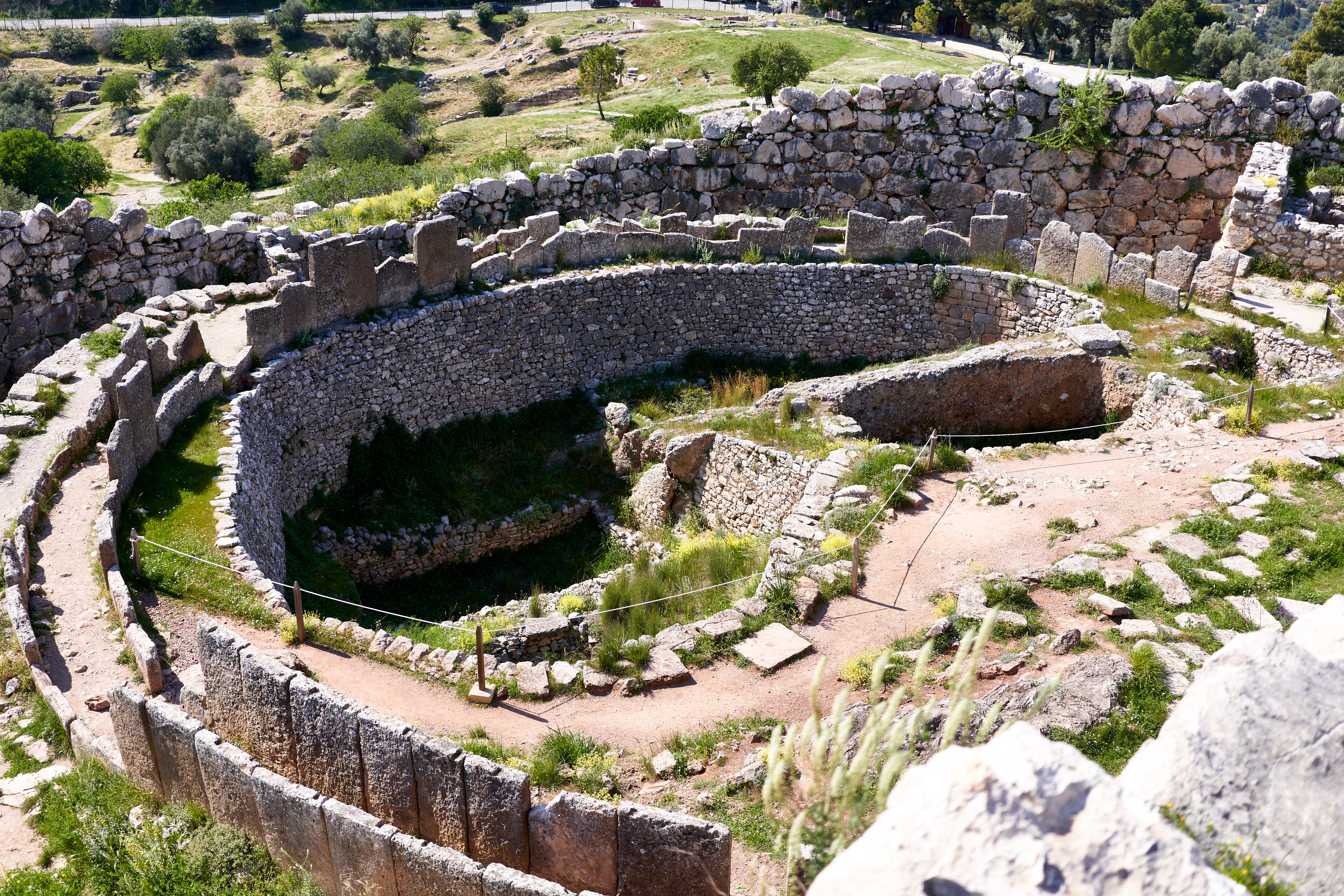
The Acropolis of Mycenae over Grave Circle A

==== Graves ====
Shaft Grave Circle A was discovered by Heinrich Schliemann and has provided archaeologists with artificial remains, predominantly weaponry and warrior iconography. One of the graves discovered within the cemetery revealed five bodies in total: two women and three men. The grave contained many weapons and intricate jewellery with the materials used to make them coming from places such as Egypt, Anatolia, Mesopotamia, and Syria. The Mycenaean record also has evidence of a different means of burial with a different style of tomb appearing before 1500; the tholos was a large stone chamber that was cut horizontally into a hillside.

== Iron Age Greece ==
The Mycenaean civilization ended at the beginning of Iron Age Greece (1100 BC), which is also known as the Dark Age of Greek history. The Early Iron Age still bears evidence of Mycenaean presence through archaeological remains at sites of Tiryns, Argos, Midea and Asine. Archaeological remains prove an earthquake disrupted Mycenaean sites such as the ones mentioned, and this earthquake led to a series of fires and smaller earthquakes; during this environmentally unstable period, the Mycenaean civilization collapsed due to political circumstances and community pressures caused by the environmental destruction.

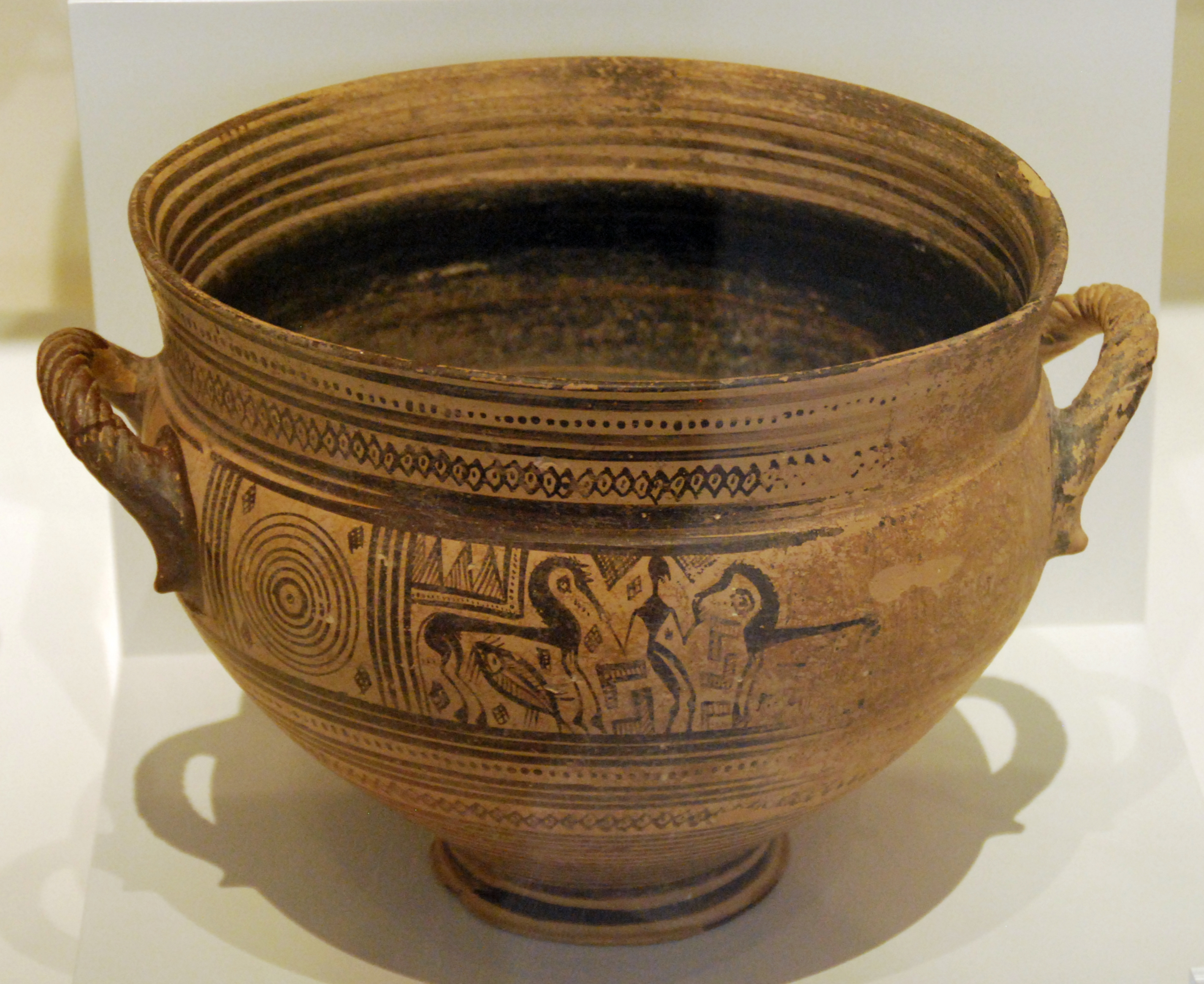
A krater vase found at Melos, Greece. It is decorated in the Late Geometric design; dated from some time between 730 and 690 BC.

=== Pottery ===
The chronology of the Iron Age in Greece was navigated through analysing the differing pottery styles. There are five noted phases in the chronology of Iron Age pottery beginning with Submycenaean (1125–1050 BC) which still contains evidence of Mycenaean influence in design. The sequential phases are then Protogeometric (1050–900 BC), Early Geometric (900–850 BC), Middle Geometric (850–760 BC) and Late Geometric (760–700 BC). Pottery designs also soon featured designs of animals, humans, and major group scenes (battles, ritual processions) at the end of the 8th century BC.

=== Graves ===
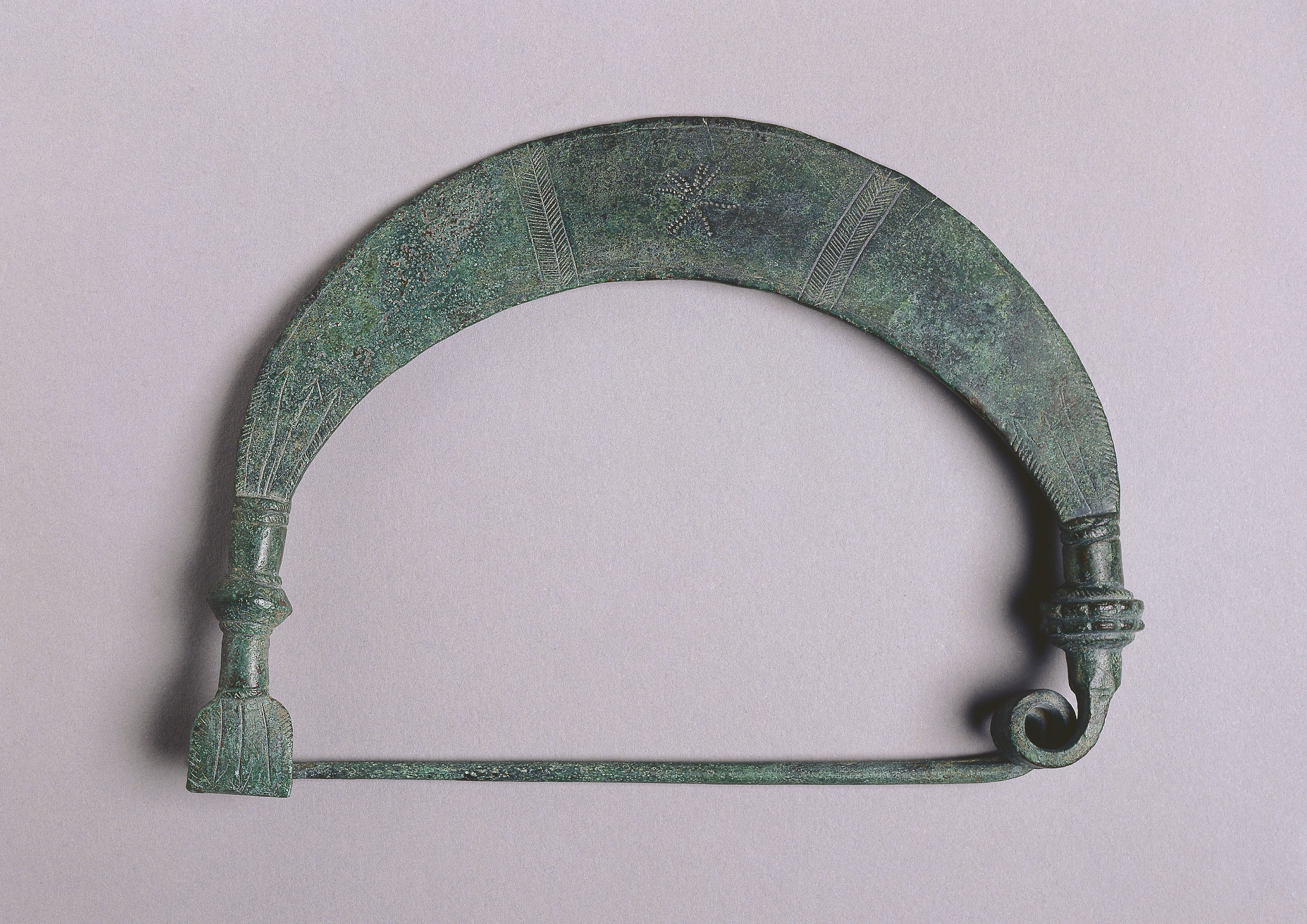
An example of a bronze fibula from 7th century BC Boeotia, Greece

Burial plots (areas of landscape that have been assigned as ancient cemeteries) of the Early Iron Age period have been discovered in East Lokris. The modern town of Atalante within the eastern Lokris region has been excavated with discoveries of two large burial plots. Both burial plots were found in the southwest of Atalante, not too far from each other. One burial plot was found at a site called Karagiorgos and the other at a site called Gouras. Karagiorgos had ten graves in total; seven were cist tombs (an elaboration of a pit burial with four walls and a roof; cist is the Greek word for box) one was a pithoi burial (a burial practice originating on Crete during the Bronze Age where bodies were placed in the pithos storage containers) and the remaining two were sarcophagi burials. The other burial plot in Gouras had thirty-three located graves; seventeen were cist tombs, fourteen were pithoi burials, and two were simple pit burials (a simple hole in the ground).

Across all the graves found at Karagiorgos and Gouras, burial offerings that were found in higher numbers were bronze dress-fasteners, fibulae, and necklaces made of faience beads.

=== The Alphabet ===
Increasing contact with the East influenced the creation of the Greek alphabet during the Iron Age; Greeks incorporated letters from the Phoenician alphabet to represent both consonant and vowel sounds in their own alphabet and created the first true phonetic alphabet. Linear B script that was introduced during the Bronze Age had eighty-seven syllables whereas the Greek alphabet introduced during the Iron Age had only twenty-four syllables; a significant advance in writing.

== Classical period ==
Classical Greek (510 BC – 323 BC) archaeology is dominated by art, religion, and war. During the Classical period, Greek cities were at war with one another and invading Persia until Athens and Sparta emerged as the superior cities following the Persian Wars (499–449 BC). Athens and Sparta rivalled for supreme power during the Peloponnesian War (431–404 BC). The war situation across the region led to significant developments in settlements, architecture, and crafts.

=== Settlements ===
Field surveying techniques have been used to unearth material that identifies farming settlements belonging to the Classical period. Surveying techniques involve analysing the stratigraphy and their deposits. Archaeological remains of evening lamps, weaving equipment, and storage vessels holing agricultural surpluses have been discovered at a few sites suggested as farming settlements. The domestic debris that have been found surrounding assumed settlement sites also indicate a prolonged residence. Surveys have been taken of rural settlement areas of several regions of Greece, and results show rural sites only account for twenty percent of classical Boeotia, twenty-five percent for classical Kea and forty percent for Archaic-Classical Laconia; this archaeological analysis determines the high probability that people more often lived in cities during this period.

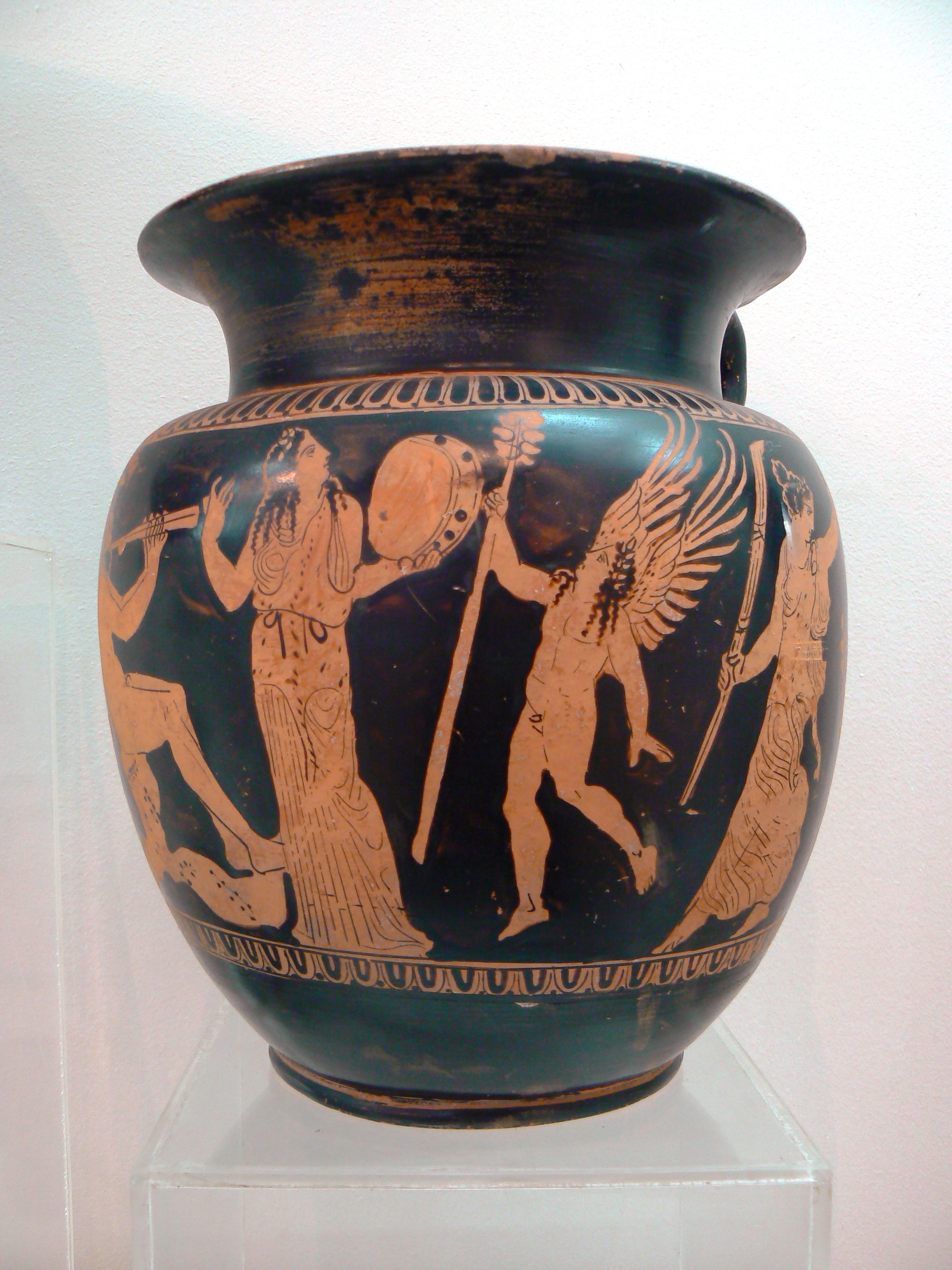
An example of a Red-figure decorated vessel from Classical Greece.

=== Pottery ===
Classical pottery depicted myths and legends, ritual processions and social activities between men and women. Scenes were predominantly painted on clay vessels using either Black-figure or Red-figure techniques; Black-figure and Red-figure pottery techniques were both used interchangeably up until the fifth century BC when Red-figure pottery became more widely used. Red-figure pottery was also out of use by the end of the fourth century BC after a decline in quality. During the sixth and fifth centuries BC, figure decoration lacked with vessels simply painted black with a metallic lustre.

Archaeologists use the remains of art in Greece to formulate conclusions on topics such as societal norms, religion, culture, and political initiatives and/or structure.

== Recent discoveries ==
In March 2021, archaeologists announced the discovery of a 2500-year-old unbroken bronze bull idol near to the temple of Greek deity Zeus in Olympia. According to archaeologist Zaharaoula Leventouri, one of the statue's horns stuck to the ground after the heavy rainfall and carefully removed from the area. Researchers also revealed fine pottery remains dated back to Greece's Geometric period. In 2020, archaeologists found a 4th-century BC terracotta mask, representing the god Dionysus, in the city's acropolis at Dascylium. In August 2021, archaeologists led by Kaan Iren announced the discovery of an ancient relief depicting Greek-Persian wars at Dascylium. Explorer Kaan Iren said: "there are Greek soldiers fighting and Persians on horseback fighting them. Greek soldiers are depicted under the hoofs of Persian horses. There is a propaganda scene here under the pretext of war".

== Works cited ==
- Bintliff, John (2012). The Complete Archaeology of Greece: From Hunter-Gatherers to the 20th Century AD. West Sussex, UK: Blackwell Publishing. ISBN 978-1-4051-5418-5.
- Deger-Jalkotzy, S. and Irene S. Lemos (2006). Ancient Greece: From the Mycenaeans Palaces to the Age of Homer. Edinburgh: Edinburgh University Press.
- Mee, Christopher (2011). Greek Archaeology: A thematic approach. West Sussex, United Kingdom: Blackwell Publishing. ISBN 978-1-4051-6734-5.
- Pomeroy, S.B., Burstein, S.M., Donlan, W., & Jennifer T. Roberts (1999). Ancient Greece: A Political, Social, and Cultural History. New York: Oxford University Press. ISBN 0-19-509742-4.
