= 1886 in science =

| List of years in science | (table) |
- … 1876; 1877; 1878; 1879; 1880; 1881; 1882; 1883; 1884; 1885; 1886; 1887; 1888; 1889; 1890; 1891; 1892; 1893; 1894; 1895; 1896 …
- Art; Archaeology; Architecture; Literature; Music; Philosophy; Science; +...

The year 1886 in science and technology involved some significant events, listed below.

== Astronomy ==
- Dorothea Klumpke takes up a post at the Paris Observatory, becoming Director of the Bureau of Measurements.

== Chemistry ==
- February 6 – German chemist Clemens Winkler discovers the chemical element Germanium.
- June 26 – Henri Moissan reports the successful isolation of elemental fluorine by electrolysis of a solution of potassium hydrogen difluoride in liquid hydrogen fluoride.
- The iodine clock reaction is discovered by Hans Heinrich Landolt.

== Exploration ==
- December 17 – English adventurer Thomas Stevens concludes the first circumnavigation by bicycle in Yokohama, having set out on his penny-farthing from San Francisco in 1884.

== History of science ==
- Dugald Clerk publishes The Gas and Oil Engine in London.

== Mathematics ==
- English mathematician Rev. William Allen Whitworth is the first to use ordered Bell numbers to count the number of weak orderings of a set.

== Medicine ==
- March 11 – The first Indian woman doctor qualifies in Western medicine, Anandi Gopal Joshi (d. 1887) at the Woman's Medical College of Pennsylvania (U.S.) She is followed by Kadambini Ganguly at the Calcutta Medical College.
- George Assaky describes a method for operating on separated nerve sutures.
- The classic descriptions of Charcot–Marie–Tooth disease are published by Jean-Martin Charcot and his pupil Pierre Marie in Paris and by Howard H. Tooth in London.
- Dr Richard von Krafft-Ebing's Psychopathia Sexualis: eine Klinisch-Forensische Studie ("Sexual Psychopathy: a Clinical-Forensic Study") is published in Stuttgart.
- Enrico Morselli reports dysmorphophobia, later described as body dysmorphic disorder.
- Heinrich Schule describes dementia praecox.
- Dr Thomas Allinson's popular book A System of Hygienic Medicine is published in England, promoting health through natural diet and exercise rather than orthodox medicine.
- Edinburgh School of Medicine for Women is founded by Dr Sophia Jex-Blake.

== Metallurgy ==
- July 9 – Charles Hall files a United States patent for the Hall–Héroult process for converting alumina into aluminium by electrolysis (discovered on February 23).

== Physics ==
- November 11 – Heinrich Hertz verifies at the University of Karlsruhe the existence of electromagnetic waves.

== Technology ==
- July 3 – Ottmar Mergenthaler's Linotype machine is introduced at the New-York Tribune.
- August 13 – Romanian inventor Alexandru Ciurcu and French journalist Just Buisson demonstrate a reaction engine, used to power a boat. On December 16 a second engine explodes, killing Buisson.
- September 21 – William Stanley, Jr. patents the induction coil in the United States, the first practical alternating current transformer device.
- October 31 – Opening of Dom Luís Bridge, Porto, a two-hinged double-deck arch bridge across the Douro River in Portugal designed by Téophile Seyrig. Its main span of 172 metres (564 ft) will remain the world's longest in iron.
- December 28 – Josephine Cochrane patents the first commercially successful automatic dishwasher in the United States.
- Gottlieb Daimler produces the first motorboat, Neckar, in Germany.
- The Lebel Model 1886 rifle is developed in France, the first military firearm to use smokeless powder ammunition.
- Auguste Mustel invents the celesta.
- Herbert Akroyd Stuart produces his first prototype heavy oil engines, in England.
- Schuyler Wheeler produces the first electric fan, in the United States.

== Awards ==
- Copley Medal: Franz Neumann
- Wollaston Medal for Geology: Alfred Des Cloizeaux

== Births ==
- January 28 – Hidetsugu Yagi, Japanese electrical engineer (died 1976)
- March 7 – G. I. Taylor, English physicist (died 1975)
- March 8 – Edward Calvin Kendall, American biochemist, winner of the Nobel Prize in Physiology or Medicine (died 1972)
- April 5 – Frederick Lindemann, German-born British physicist (died 1957)
- May 22 – Hermann Stieve, German anatomist and histologist (died 1952)
- June 7 – Henri Coandă, Romanian aeronautical engineer (died 1972)
- June 18 – Tsuruko Haraguchi, born Tsuru Arai, Japanese psychologist (died 1915)
- July 6 – Ronald Hatton, English pomologist (died 1965)
- July 19 – Michael Fekete, Hungarian-born Israeli mathematician (died 1957)
- July 30 – Muthulakshmi Reddi, Indian physician and social reformer (died 1968)
- September 26 – Archibald Hill, English physiologist, winner of the Nobel Prize in Physiology or Medicine (died 1977)
- November 20 – Karl von Frisch, Austrian ethologist, winner of the Nobel Prize in Physiology or Medicine (died 1982)
- December 9 – Clarence Birdseye, American founder of the modern frozen food industry (died 1956)

== Deaths ==
- February 25 – Lady Katherine Sophia Kane, Irish botanist (born 1811)
- March 15 – Anastasie Fătu, Moldavian and Romanian physician and naturalist (born 1816)
- June 7 – Richard March Hoe, American inventor (born 1812)
- July 1 – Otto Wilhelm Hermann von Abich, German mineralogist and geologist (born 1806)
- August 17 – Aleksandr Butlerov, Russian chemist (born 1828)
- November 14 – Alexandre-Emile Béguyer de Chancourtois, French mineralogist and geologist (born 1820).
- November 25 – Richard Maack, Russian naturalist, geographer and anthropologist (born 1825)
- September 18 – Sampson Gamgee, English surgeon (born 1828).
- December 26 – Theodor von Oppolzer, Austrian astronomer (born 1841)
