= 1822 in archaeology =

The year 1822 in archaeology involved some significant events.

== Finds ==
- March 23 - Stone coffin of Thomas, 2nd Earl of Lancaster (executed 1322) is found at Ferry Fryston in West Yorkshire (England).
- Smythe's Megalith in Kent (England) is identified but dismantled.
- Turin King List is discovered by Bernardino Drovetti.
- First discoveries of Golasecca culture.

== Publications ==
- Descriptions of the Ruins of an Ancient City, discovered near Palenque published in London. The first book on the Maya site of Palenque, based on the accounts of Antonio Bernasconi and Antonio del Rio, and illustrated with engravings based on the drawings of Bernasconi and Luciano Castañeda.

== Miscellaneous ==
- September 27 - Jean-François Champollion announces his success in deciphering Egyptian hieroglyphs using the Rosetta Stone in a letter to the Académie des Inscriptions et Belles-Lettres in Paris (based on the work of Thomas Young).

== Births ==
- January 6 - Heinrich Schliemann, excavator of Troy (d. 1890)
- February 23 - Giovanni Battista de Rossi, developed Christian archeology (d. 1894)

== See also ==
- Ancient Egypt / Egyptology
