= George Assaky =

Romanian physician

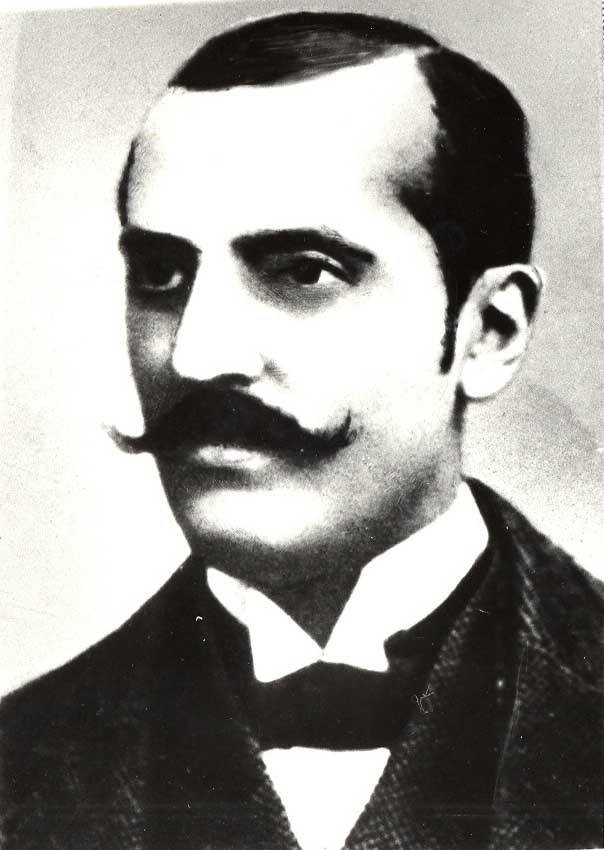
- Born: 1 January 1855; Iași, Principality of Moldavia
- Died: 29 April 1899 (aged 44); Bucharest, Kingdom of Romania
- Occupation: physician

George Assaky (January 1, 1855 – April 29, 1899) was a Romanian physician.

Born in Iași, he was the grandson of Gheorghe Asachi. After completing high school, he left for France in 1873. There, he enrolled in the medical faculty of Montpellier University. The following year, he transferred to the equivalent section of the University of Paris, from which he graduated. From 1875 to 1877, he worked in the embryology laboratory at the Collège de France. He returned home during the Romanian War of Independence, joining the ambulance service and caring for wounded soldiers. Assaky subsequently went back to France to continue his studies, and in 1879 finished first at an examination for Parisian interns. From that year until 1882, he worked as a surgical intern in the French capital. Meanwhile, he wrote for a number of medical journals. In 1886, he defended a thesis titled De la suture des nerfs à distance; it dealt with separated nerve sutures and described a procedure that came to be known as the Assaky operation. The same year, he obtained the title of aggregate professor.

In early 1887, Assaky returned to Romania, being greeted at Bucharest North railway station by a large, enthusiastic group of medical students. He had been offered a post as professor of clinical surgery within the University of Bucharest's medical faculty by the Liberal government. The fact that the job was offered without a competition irked fellow doctors, prompting the government to push a special law through parliament creating positions for Assaky, Victor Babeș and Nicolae Kalinderu. The law passed, although itself raised the objection that it infringed upon university autonomy. Assaky went on to found a surgery institute at Filantropia Hospital, and attended the International Medical Congress, held in Washington, D.C., in September 1887. He left Romania again around 1889, tired of certain colleagues' hostility and intrigue. For several years, he was aggregate professor at the University of Lille. He settled permanently in Bucharest in 1897 as director of the newly founded gynecology institute and professor of clinical gynecology. He died in the city two years later, at the height of his powers, aged 44.

Assaky's contributions were primarily in the fields of anatomy, physiology, embryology, surgery and gynecology, and his work was cited in numerous treatises of medicine and surgery. He was among the first Romanian surgeons to introduce modern principles of asepsis, antisepsis and a properly equipped operating room, as well as techniques of general surgery. His chief work, the doctoral thesis, received a prize from the Académie Nationale de Médecine; it reveals his method as being a precursor of nerve surgery and of experimental techniques in the field. Also in 1886, he published research into the influence of mechanical conditions on nerve growth. In 1890, he was elected a corresponding member of the Romanian Academy.
