= 1801 in archaeology =

The year 1801 in archaeology involved some significant events.

== Excavations ==
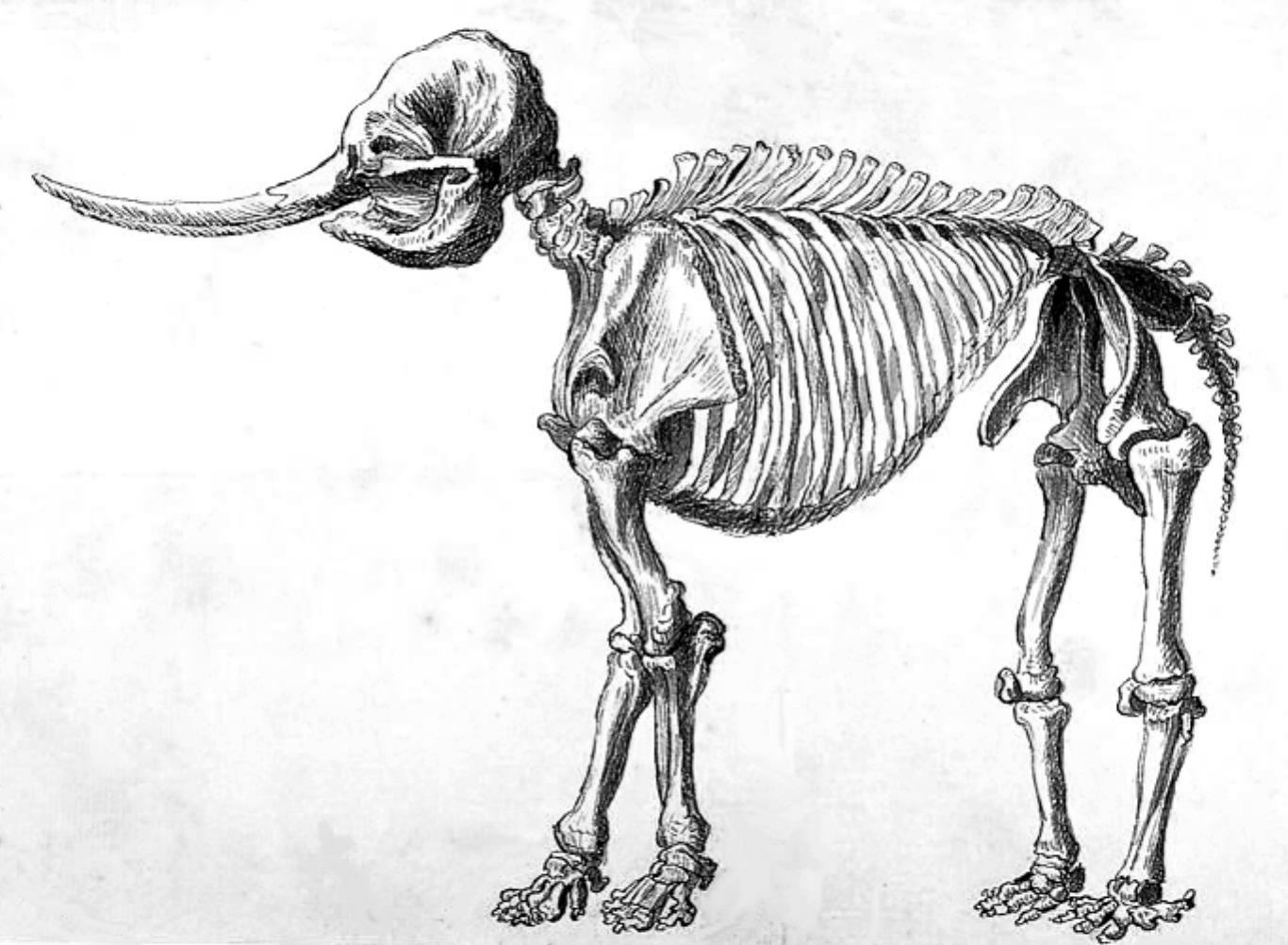
Drawing of a mastodon skeleton by Rembrandt Peale

- The first complete mastodon skeleton is excavated, before dinosaurs were discovered.

== Events ==
- The first of the Elgin Marbles brought from Athens to London by Thomas Bruce, 7th Earl of Elgin.

== Births ==
- Joseph Barnard Davis, English craniologist (d. 1881)
