= 1852 in archaeology =

Below are notable events in archaeology that occurred in 1852.

== Excavations ==
- January - Excavations of the royal palace at Dur-Sharrukin are resumed by Victor Place.
- Excavations at Nineveh are continued by H. C. Rawlinson.
- Excavations at Babylon by Julius Oppert begin.
- Excavations in the Nile Valley by Hekekyan Bey begin.

== Finds ==
- Antique-collecting grave robbers dig up the bones of Lilias Adie who died in 1704 in custody under investigation for witchcraft at Torryburn, Scotland.
- In May, excavations by Charles Ernest Beulé on the Acropolis of Athens discover the remains of the Beulé Gate.

== Publications ==
- William Michael Wylie - Fairford Graves: a record of researches in an Anglo-Saxon burial place in Gloucestershire.

== Births ==
- March 30 - James Theodore Bent, English explorer, archaeologist and author (died 1897).

== Deaths ==
- March 5 - Bernardino Drovetti, Piedmontese antiquarian and Egyptologist (born 1776).
- October 13 - John Lloyd Stephens, American explorer of Maya civilization sites in Mesoamerica (born 1805).

== See also ==
- List of years in archaeology
- 1851 in archaeology
- 1853 in archaeology
