= 1872 in archaeology =

Below are notable events in archaeology that occurred in 1872.

== Events ==
- ca. June - The ship Napried, carrying approximately 5,000 of the antiquities collected by Luigi Palma di Cesnola on Cyprus bound for the Metropolitan Museum of Art in New York, is lost in the Mediterranean Sea.
- December 3 - George Smith presents the first translation of the Epic of Gilgamesh to a meeting of the Society of Biblical Archaeology in London.

== Excavations ==
- Excavations on Delos by the French School at Athens begin.

== Finds ==
- Loughton Camp in Epping Forest 'discovered' by Benjamin Harris Cowper.
- Spring - First portion of Lenape Stone said to have been discovered in Bucks County, Pennsylvania by Barnard Hansell.

== Publications ==
- William Copeland Borlase - Nænia Cornubiæ: a descriptive essay, illustrative of the sepulchres and funereal customs of the early inhabitants of the county of Cornwall.
- John Evans - The Ancient Stone Implements, Weapons and Ornaments of Great Britain.
- James Fergusson - Rude Stone Monuments in all Countries.

== Births ==
- January 15 - Harold St George Gray, English archaeologist (d. 1963)
