= 1971 in archaeology =

== Explorations ==
- The Historic American Engineering Record surveys the original main line of the New York and Erie Rail Road; the Cooper Union foundation building in Manhattan; and sites in Utah and Pennsylvania

== Excavations ==
- The Chaco Project, conducted by the National Park Service and the University of New Mexico, surveys and excavates Chaco Canyon (until 1982)
- Wesleyan and Tufts Universities begin an excavation and survey program around the town of Buccino in the Campania (Italy) to determine settlement patterns during the Roman period. In this season they run a series of experiments using the Barringer proton magnetometer to test the feasibility of its use in the area and excavate three villa sites: Vagni, lying on an artificial terraced platform overlooking the Cosenza-Potenza road and the Platona-Tanagro valley, within which pottery including black glaze is found, and there is evidence that the countryside around was used until the last years of the 4th century; Pareti, which yields much pottery from the Lucanian and polygonal platform walls; and San Nicola, below the town and across the river
- Scientific excavations at Anshan in Iran begin

== Publications ==
- Peter Brunt
  - Italian Manpower 225 B.C.–A.D. 14, Oxford: Clarendon Press
  - Social Conflicts in the Roman Republic, London: Chatto & Windus.
- M. D. Leakey - Olduvai Gorge Volume 3, Excavations in Beds I & II 1960–1963, Cambridge University Press

== Finds ==
- May 5 - Hull of Tudor navy ship Mary Rose (capsized 1545) rediscovered in the Solent
- July - Guns and other artefacts from HMY Mary (wrecked 1675) discovered independently by members of Chorley and Merseyside Sub-Aqua Clubs
- July 22 - The Lady of Baza Iberian sculpture (4th century BC)
- September 16 - Wreck site of Dutch East Indiaman Hollandia (1742 ship) (wrecked 1743) discovered in the Isles of Scilly by Rex Cowan
- Remains of Marsala Punic shipwreck (sank c. 241 BC) exposed off Sicily
- Remains of HMS Culloden (1776) discovered off Montauk, New York
- Tomb of King Muryeong (d. 523), ruler of Baekje in the Three Kingdoms of Korea
- Tomb of Xin Zhui (d. 163 BC) at Mawangdui in Changsha, China

== Miscellaneous ==
- October - Society for Industrial Archeology founded in Washington, D.C.

== Deaths ==
- August 22 - Birger Nerman, Swedish archaeologist (b. 1888)
- August 24 - Carl Blegen, American Classical archaeologist (b. 1887)
