= 1803 in archaeology =

The year 1803 in archaeology involved few significant events.

== Explorations ==
- First scientific expedition visits Tikal.

== Births ==
- 7 May: John Howard Marsden, English archaeologist (d. 1870)
- 31 December: Johann Carl Fuhlrott, German archaeologist (d. 1877)
