= 1800 in archaeology =

The year 1800 in archaeology involved some significant events.

== Excavations ==
- Bretby Castle, Derbyshire, England, a 16th-century fortified manor, is partially excavated.

== Births ==
- February 16 - Charles Masson, born James Lewis, British explorer of Buddhist sites and numismatist (d. 1853)
- August 13 - Ippolito Rosellini, Tuscan Egyptologist (d. 1843)
- October 8 - Jules Desnoyers, French geologist and archaeologist (d. 1887)
- December 24 - Ferdinand Keller, Swiss archaeologist (d. 1881)

== Deaths ==
- June 28 - Théophile Corret de la Tour d'Auvergne, French antiquary (b. 1743)
