= 1896 in archaeology =

Below are notable events in archaeology that occurred in 1896.

== Excavations ==
- Bernard Grenfell and Arthur Hunt of Queen's College, Oxford, begin excavation at Oxyrhynchus, Egypt, discovering New Testament texts amongst the Oxyrhynchus Papyri.
- Richard Wetherill begins excavating Chaco Canyon.
- George H. Pepper from the American Museum of Natural History leads the Hyde Exploring Expedition in excavating Pueblo Bonito (ending 1899).
- A. S. Murray of the British Museum begins excavating Enkomi, Cyprus.
- Society of Antiquaries of Scotland begins excavating Ardoch Roman Fort.

== Publications ==
- Sousa Viterbo - Archeologia industrial Portuguesa: Os moinhos. O Archeologo Português II(8/9): 193-204 (Aug./Sept.)

== Finds ==
- February - Broighter Gold found by farmer, Tom Nicholl.
- December 1 - Archaeologist Alois Anton Führer, Nepalese General Khadga Samsher Rana and an expedition rediscover the great stone pillar of Ashoka at Lumbini, traditionally the spot of the birthplace of Gautama Buddha, after using Faxian's records.
- Charioteer of Delphi found at the Temple of Apollo at Delphi by French excavators.
- Madaba Map.
- Flinders Petrie discovers the Merneptah Stele at Luxor Temple

== Miscellaneous ==
- April 1 - The Louvre Museum in Paris announces its purchase of the gold Tiara of Saitaferne, which it claims is a Scythian royal artefact of the 2nd/3rd century BCE. It later emerges that it was manufactured two years previously.
- April 6 - The opening ceremonies of the 1896 Summer Olympics, the first modern Olympic Games, are held at the Panathenaic Stadium in Athens.
- April 16 - The National Trust for Places of Historic Interest or Natural Beauty in England acquires its first building for preservation, Alfriston Clergy House, a 14th-century Wealden hall house.

== Births ==
- July 12 - Li Ji, Chinese archaeologist (d. 1979)

== Deaths ==
- January 28 - Giuseppe Fiorelli, Italian archaeologist of Pompeii (b. 1823)
- February 24 - Mariano Armellini, Italian archaeologist of early Christian Rome (b. 1852)
- April 12 - Carl Humann, German archaeologist (b. 1839)
- June 10 - John Henry Middleton, English archaeologist (b. 1846)
- July 11 - Ernst Curtius, German archaeologist (b. 1814)
- December 17 - Charles Edwin Wilbour, American Egyptologist and writer (b. 1833)
