= 1877 in archaeology =

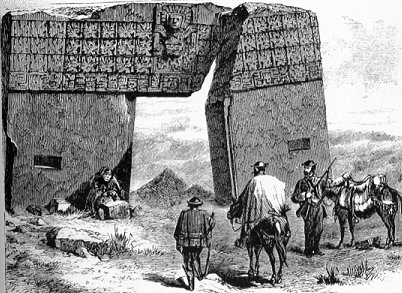
"Gateway of the Sun" at Tiahuanaco, as published in Ephraim G. Squier's Peru: Incidents of Travel

Below are notable events in archaeology that occurred in 1877.

== Explorations ==
- Artist and photographer William Henry Jackson participates in the Hayden Survey of the Western United States, producing maps of Chaco Canyon, but no photographs due to technical problems.

== Excavations ==
- French diplomat and archaeologist Ernest de Sarzec begins excavation at Girsu in Mesopotamia (which he believes to be Lagash).
- City architect Charles Edward Davis begins extended excavation and reconstruction at the Roman Baths (Bath) in England.
- George Smith excavates Later Stone Age tools in caves near Smithfield, Free State.

== Finds ==
- May 8 - Hermes and the Infant Dionysus (attributed to the sculptor Praxiteles, 4th century BC) is first uncovered at the site of the Temple of Hera, Olympia, Greece, by German archaeologist Ernst Curtius; it is later exhibited at the Archaeological Museum of Olympia.

== Publications ==
- Canon William Greenwell - British Barrows: a record of the examination of sepulchral mounds in various parts of England; together with description of figures of skulls, general remarks on prehistoric crania, and an appendix by George Rolleston.
- John Postlethwaite - Mines and Mining in the Lake District.
- Ephraim G. Squier - Peru: Incidents of Travel and Exploration in the Land of the Incas.

== Miscellaneous ==
- May 17 - Witcham Gravel helmet, found, probably earlier this decade, in Cambridgeshire, England, is first displayed, to the Society of Antiquaries of London by Augustus Wollaston Franks.

== Births ==
- June 16 - Karel Absolon, Czech archaeologist (d. 1960)
- July 29 - Edward Thurlow Leeds, English archaeologist of the Anglo-Saxons (d. 1955)

== Deaths ==
- October 17 - Johann Carl Fuhlrott, discoverer of Neanderthal Man (b. 1803)

== See also ==
- Ancient Greece / Prehistoric man
