= 1876 in archaeology =

Below are notable events in archaeology that occurred in 1876.

== Excavations ==
- Mycenae by Heinrich Schliemann.

== Finds ==
- The "Mask of Agamemnon" found at Mycenae by Heinrich Schliemann. Later in the year Schliemann supposedly telegraphs a Greek newspaper "I have gazed on the face of Agamemnon".
- June 29 - Robin Hood Cave Horse, a fragment of rib engraved with a horse's head, discovered by Rev. J. M. Mello at Creswell Crags in the north east midlands of England, the only piece of Upper Paleolithic portable art showing an animal to be found in Britain.
- October - Excavations by John Clayton in Coventina's Well at Carrawburgh on Hadrian's Wall yield at least 13,400 Roman coins.

== Publications ==
- Amelia Edwards - A Thousand Miles up the Nile.

== Births ==
- March 19 - John Marshall, English Director-General of the Archaeological Survey of India (died 1958).
- May 5 - John Garstang, English archaeologist of the Near East (died 1956).

== Deaths ==
- August 19 - George Smith, English Assyriologist (born 1840)

== See also ==
- Ancient Egypt / Egyptology
