= 1878 in archaeology =

Below are notable events in archaeology that occurred in 1878.

== Excavations ==
- Christos Stamatakis excavates the Treasury of Atreus, Mycenae, Greece (built c.1300–1200 BC).
- Excavation of Vinovia Roman fort in the north of England begins.
- September - Carl Humann begins excavations at Pergamon.

== Publications ==
- American Antiquarian founded by Rev. Stephen D. Peet.
- Isaac Fletcher - "The Archaeology of the West Cumberland Coal Trade", Transactions of the Cumberland and Westmorland Antiquarian & Archaeological Society. doi:10.5284/1064794

== Finds ==
- The Balawat Gates are discovered in Assyria by Hormuzd Rassam.
- 31 Iguanodon skeletons are discovered in a coal mine at Bernissart, Belgium.
- Pergamon Altar.
- Birka female Viking warrior excavated by Hjalmar Stolpe on the Swedish island of Björkö but believed at this time to be male.
- Bayou St. John submarine.

== Other events ==
- September 12 - 'Cleopatra's Needle' is erected beside the River Thames in London.

== Births ==
- December 29 - Félix-Marie Abel, French biblical archaeologist (d. 1953)
