= 1875 in archaeology =

Below are notable events in archaeology that occurred in 1875.

== Excavations ==
- Ernst Curtius begins excavations at Olympia, Greece which continue until 1881.
- Archaeological survey of Adhai Din Ka Jhonpra in Ajmer, British India, begins.
- Lovatelli urn found during Edoardo Brizio excavation of the columbarium of the Statilia on the Esquiline in Rome

== Publications ==
- William Collings Lukis:
  - A Guide to the Principal Chambered Barrows and other Pre-historic Monuments in the Islands of the Morbihan, the communes of Locmariaker, Carnac, Plouharnel and Erdeven, and the peninsulas of Quiberon and Rhuis, Brittany.
  - On the class of rude stone monuments which are commonly called in England cromlechs, and in France dolmens, and are here shown to have been the sepulchral chambers of once-existing mounds.

== Births ==
- October 21 – Sir Guy Francis Laking, English art historian, keeper of the London Museum (d. 1919)
- November 19 – Hiram Bingham III, American explorer of South America (d. 1933)
- December 13 – Arthur Callender, English engineer and archaeologist, assistant to Howard Carter during the excavation of Tutankhamun's tomb (d. 1936)

== Deaths ==
- April 30 – Jean-Frédéric Waldeck, French antiquarian, artist and explorer (b. 1766?)
- October 29 – John Gardiner Wilkinson, English traveller, writer and pioneer Egyptologist (b. 1797)

== See also ==
- Ancient Egypt / Egyptology
