= 1895 in archaeology =

Below are notable events in archaeology that occurred in 1895.

== Explorations ==
- Teoberto Maler makes first examinations of the Maya site of Seibal.
- Eliseo Borghi begins first examinations of the Nemi ships wreck site.

== Finds ==
- Mithraeum at Sarrebourg.
- Roman coin hoard at Boscoreale.

== Deaths ==
- 5 March: Sir Henry Rawlinson, 1st Baronet, English Assyriologist (b. 1810).
