= 1880 in archaeology =

Below are notable events in archaeology that occurred in 1880.

== Explorations ==
- William Matthew Flinders Petrie travels to Egypt and conducts a survey of the Great Pyramid of Giza.

== Excavations ==
- Nicolay Nicolaysen excavates the Gokstad ship in Norway.
- Heinrich Schliemann begins excavation around the Tomb of Minyas at Orchomenus (Boeotia).

== Finds ==
- The foundations of a convent, first erected in 670, discovered at Minster in Kent.
- Varvakeion Athena.
- The mandible of a Neanderthal child is discovered in a secure context in Šipka cave in the Austro-Hungarian Empire (modern-day Czech Republic) associated with cultural debris including hearths, Mousterian tools and bones of extinct animals.

== Publications ==
- Marcelino Sanz de Sautuola and Juan Vilanova y Piera publish their initial findings on the paintings in the Cave of Altamira, suggesting to initial scepticism that they are of the Paleolithic period.
- The Journal of Hellenic Studies begins publication.

== Births ==
- April 11 – Julio C. Tello, Peruvian archaeologist (d. 1947)
- April 17 – Leonard Woolley, British archaeologist of Mesopotamia (d. 1960)
