= 1883 in archaeology =

Below are notable events in archaeology that occurred in 1883.

== Excavations ==
- In Cyprus, the three sanctuaries and the tombs are excavated for the Cyprus Museum.
- In Rome, the Palace of the Vestals (atrium of Vesta), the abode of the virgin priestesses of the goddess, the Vestal Virgins, is excavated in 1883 to 1884.
- In Athens, Greece, the Olympieion is excavated in 1883 to 1884 by the British.
- In Wales, at Cae Gwyn Cave, Tremeirchion, Denbighshire, the cave is extensively investigated from 1883 to 1887 by H. Hicks: artefacts found, mostly just outside the entrance, date to the middle Aurignacian period.
- In Charleston, West Virginia, the Criel Mound, a burial mound for Adena culture chieftains, is excavated in 1883 to 1884 under the auspices of the Smithsonian Institution's Bureau of Ethnology and the supervision of Col. P.W. Norris.
- At Taplow Court in England, the Taplow burial, a burial mound of a Saxon prince presumed to be Tæppa, is excavated and a number of treasures are discovered.

== Discoveries ==
- "Coba Tumulus" at Sakçagözü by Karl Humann and Felix von Luschan.
- A large Gallo-Roman mosaic pavement at Grand, Vosges.

== Finds ==
- Ceratosaurus nasicornis (now on display at the Smithsonian) is excavated in 1883, and later named and described by Marsh (March 19, 1884).

== Miscellaneous ==
- January 1 - Augustus Pitt Rivers takes office as Britain's first Inspector of Ancient Monuments.
- Moses Shapira presents the Shapira Scroll, a continuing source of controversy.

== Births ==
- June 7 - Sylvanus G. Morley, Mayanist. (died 1948)
