= 1885 in science =

The year 1885 in science and technology involved some significant events, listed below.

== Astronomy ==
- August 20 – Ernst Hartwig discovers S Andromedae, a supernova in the Andromeda Galaxy, the first supernova discovered beyond the Milky Way.

== Biology ==
- The genus Plasmodium is described by Ettore Marchiafava and Angelo Celli.
- The bacterium Escherichia coli (E. coli) is discovered by Theodor Escherich.
- The bacterium Salmonella enterica is discovered by Theobald Smith, working under Daniel Elmer Salmon.
- Hans Driesch performs a form of artificial cloning on a sea urchin embryo.

== Chemistry ==
- Carl Auer von Welsbach patents his first incandescent gas mantle.
- Eugen Goldstein names the cathode ray, later discovered to be composed of electrons, and the canal ray, later discovered to be positive hydrogen ions that have been stripped of their electrons in a cathode-ray tube; these will later be named protons.

== Earth sciences ==
- Eduard Suess begins publication in Vienna of his Das Antlitz der Erde setting out his theory of eustasy, the existence of the former supercontinent Gondwana, and his pioneering concepts in ecology.

== Medicine ==
- January 4 – The first successful appendectomy is performed by Dr. William W. Grant on Mary Gartside.
- July 6 – Louis Pasteur and Émile Roux successfully test their rabies vaccine. The patient is Joseph Meister, a boy bitten by a rabid dog.
- Georges Gilles de la Tourette publishes an account of nine patients with what will become known as Tourette syndrome.

== Meteorology ==
- January 15 – American photographer Wilson Bentley takes the first known photograph of a snowflake by attaching a view camera to a microscope.

== Physics ==
- Johann Balmer publishes an empirical mathematical formula for the visible spectral lines of the hydrogen atom.

== Psychology ==
- Hermann Ebbinghaus publishes Über das Gedächtnis ("On Memory", later translated as Memory: a Contribution to Experimental Psychology).

== Technology ==
- March 24 – George H. Pegram is granted a United States patent for the Pegram truss.
- April 3 – Gottlieb Daimler is granted a German patent for his single-cylinder water-cooled engine design.
- August 29 – Gottlieb Daimler is granted a German patent for the Daimler Reitwagen, regarded as the first motorcycle, which he has produced with Wilhelm Maybach.
- September 5? – Sylvanus Bowser markets his patented kerosene pump in the United States.
- September 30 – Tolbert Lanston makes his first application for a United States patent on a typesetting system which includes the basic Monotype System keyboard.
- Autumn – Karl Benz produces the Benz Patent-Motorwagen, regarded as the first automobile (patented and publicly launched the following January).
- John Kemp Starley demonstrates the Rover safety bicycle, regarded as the first practical modern bicycle.
- The first, not yet practical, form of gyrocompass is patented by Marinus Gerardus van den Bos.
- Rufus Eastman patents the first known electric food mixer.
- Completion of the Home Insurance Building in Chicago, designed by William Le Baron Jenney. With ten floors and a fireproof weight-bearing metal frame, it is regarded as the first skyscraper.
- Completion of Sway Tower in Hampshire, England, designed by Andrew Peterson using concrete made with Portland cement. It remains the world's tallest non-reinforced concrete structure.
- The Nipkow disk is patented by German scientist Paul Gottlieb Nipkow.

== Institutions ==
- October 13 – The Georgia Institute of Technology is established in Atlanta (United States) as the Georgia School of Technology to teach mechanical engineering.

== Awards ==
- Copley Medal: Friedrich August Kekulé von Stradonitz
- Wollaston Medal for Geology: George Busk

== Births ==
- January 24 – Marjory Stephenson (died 1948), English biochemist
- January 26 – Harry Ricardo (died 1974), English mechanical engineer
- March 23 – John Fraser (died 1947), Scottish surgeon
- June 2 – Hans Gerhard Creutzfeldt (died 1964), German neuropathologist
- August 1 – George de Hevesy (died 1966), Hungarian Nobel laureate in chemistry
- September 8 – Douglas Guthrie (died 1975), Scottish otolaryngologist and medical historian
- September 16 – Karen Horney (died 1952), German-born psychoanalyst
- October 7 – Niels Bohr (died 1962), Danish physicist
- October 23 – Jan Czochralski (died 1953), Polish discoverer of the Czochralski process for growing crystals
- October 26 – Niels Erik Nørlund (died 1981), Danish mathematician
- November 7 – Sabina Spielrein (died 1942), Russian psychoanalyst
- November 9 – Hermann Weyl (died 1955), German mathematician
- December 2 – George Minot (died 1950), American Nobel laureate in physiology

== Deaths ==
- February 1 – Sidney Gilchrist Thomas (born 1850), British inventor
- February 8 – Nikolai Severtzov (born 1827), Russian explorer and naturalist
- March 14 – Friedrich Theodor von Frerichs (born 1819), German medical pathologist
- June 12 – Fleeming Jenkin (born 1833), English engineer
- September 6 – Narcís Monturiol (born 1819), Catalan intellectual, artist and engineer, inventor of an early submarine
- September 15 – Jumbo (born 1861), African elephant, killed in railroad accident
- November 26 – Thomas Andrews (born 1813), Irish chemist
