= 1893 in archaeology =

Below are notable events in archaeology that occurred in 1893.

== Excavations ==
- September 11–October 25 - Augustus Pitt Rivers excavates Wor Barrow ditch.
- Wilhelm Dörpfeld begins his excavations of Troy.
- House of the Silver Wedding, Pompeii. Built in early 1st century AD. Excavated the year of silver wedding anniversary of Italy's King Humbert and his wife, Margherita of Savoy, who have supported archaeological fieldwork at Pompeii.
- March 31 - The Dartmoor Exploration Committee commence their excavations of the Bronze Age settlement of Grimspound.

== Publications ==
- Baron J. de Baye - The Industrial Arts of the Anglo-Saxons. Sonnenschein, London.
- Gustaf Nordenskiöld - The Cliff Dwellers of the Mesa Verde, Southwestern Colorado, Their Pottery and Their Implements. P. A. Norstedt and Soner, Stockholm-Chicago.
- Alois Riegl - Stilfragen: Grundlegungen zu einer Geschichte der Ornamentik, George Siemens, Berlin.

== Finds ==
- Jacques de Morgan discovers six boats near the Middle Kingdom pyramid of Senwosret III at Dahshur.
- First of the Abusir Papyri from Egypt.
- First finds from the Butmir culture near Sarajevo.

== Births ==
- August 9: Frans Blom, Mayanist (d. 1963)

== Deaths ==
- November 28: Alexander Cunningham, archaeologist of India (b. 1814)
