= 1879 in archaeology =

Below are notable events in archaeology that occurred in 1879.

== Excavations ==
- Major excavation at Babylon, conducted by Hormuzd Rassam on behalf of the British Museum. Work continues until 1882.
- Excavation of the group tomb of the Sacred Band of Thebes who fell in the Battle of Chaeronea (338 BC) in Boeotia by Panagiotis Stamatakis.
- Excavation of the stone circles of Junapani by J. H. Rivett-Carnac in Maharashtra.

== Finds ==
- April 12 – Burial of a Thracian chieftain at Dalboki in central Bulgaria.
- Paintings of bison on the ceiling of the Cave of Altamira in Spain. c.12000 BC; accepted as authentic in 1902.
- Bronze Age weapons hoard at New Bradwell, Buckinghamshire, England.
- A statue of Zeus was found, possibly at Tell es-Sanam in Palestine.

== Events ==
- May 10 – Establishment of the Archaeological Institute of America.
- Establishment of the Bureau of Ethnology.
- Percy Gardner is elected to the Disney Professorship of Archaeology in the University of Cambridge.

== Births ==
- March 29 – Alan Gardiner, English Egyptologist (died 1963).
- July 13 – Alan Wace, English Classical archaeologist (died 1957).
- September 13 – Harry Burton, English archaeological photographer, known for his photos of the excavation of Tutankhamun's tomb (died 1940).
- Grace Mary Crowfoot, née Hood, English textile archaeologist (died 1957).

== See also ==
- Cave art / Bison
