= 1886 in archaeology =

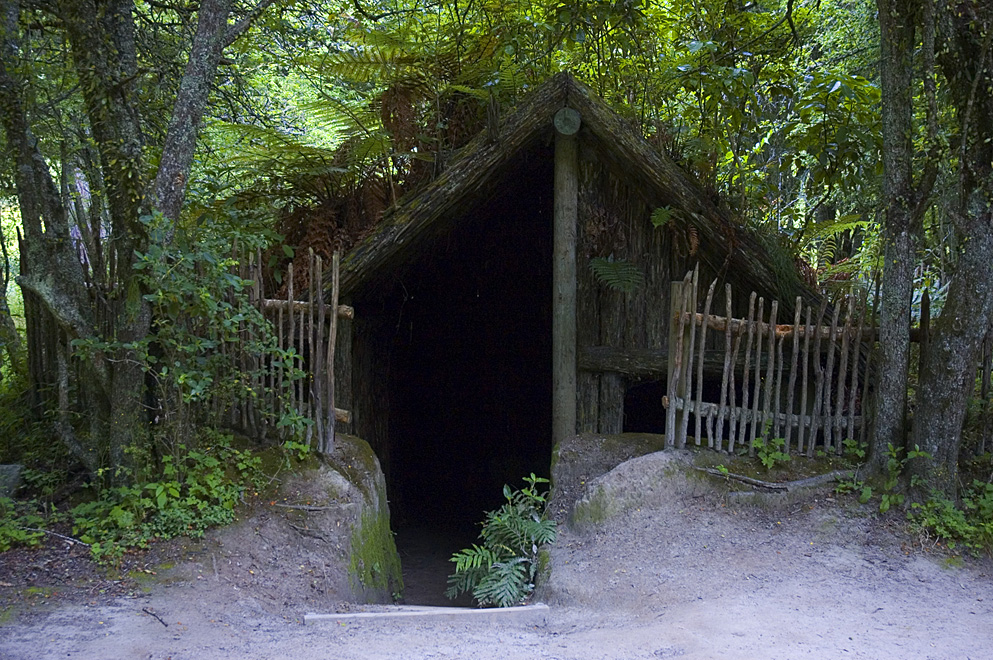
Dwelling at Te Wairoa, buried during the 1886 eruption of Mount Tarawera

Below are notable events in archaeology that occurred in 1886.

== Excavations ==
- October 4 – Augustus Pitt Rivers begins excavation of the Romano-British settlement site on Rotherley Down.

== Finds ==
- September – Beothuk child burial on an island of Newfoundland.
- The well-preserved skeletons of a Neanderthal man and woman with Mousterian stone implements are found in the Betche aux Roches cavern at Spy, Belgium, by Maximin Lohest and Marcel de Puydt.
- Minaret of Jam in Afghanistan recorded by Thomas Holdich.
- Armed Aphrodite statue in Epidaurus, Greece.

== Events ==
- June 10 – Te Wairoa is buried by a volcanic eruption.

== Births ==
- October 28 – O. G. S. Crawford, British archaeologist (d. 1957).

== Deaths ==
- January 9 – James Fergusson, Scottish-born antiquarian, architect and merchant (b. 1808).
- June 5 – Llewellynn Jewitt, British archaeologist, illustrator and natural scientist (b. 1816).
