= 1894 in archaeology =

Below are notable events in archaeology that occurred in 1894.

== Explorations ==
- Thomas Gann makes first scientific exploration of Xunantunich.
- Henri Lammens visits the Roman temple of Bziza.

== Excavations ==
- March 29–May 12 - Augustus Pitt Rivers excavates Wor Barrow mound on Cranborne Chase in England.
- Peabody Museum of Archaeology and Ethnology - Harvard University project at Copán in Honduras concludes.
- On Dartmoor in England, Grimspound late Bronze Age settlement is excavated and partially reconstructed and Langstone Moor stone circle is largely re-erected.
- Sir Henry Meux excavates Avebury in Wiltshire, England.
- Flinders Petrie begins excavation of the Naqada culture in Egypt.
- 2-year investigation of the Pyramid of Senusret I at Lisht in Egypt by Swiss archaeologists Jules-Émile Gautier and Gustave Jéquier begins.

== Finds ==
- Knossos is found by Arthur Evans.
- Roman silver plate, dated to 2nd–4th century, unearthed near Yenikend, Azerbaijan.
- Roman milestones found in bed of River Petteril near Carlisle (Luguvalium) on the northern border of England.

== Publications ==
- In the 12th Annual Report of the Bureau of Ethnology, Cyrus Thomas' detailed report on the Mound Builders demolishes the earlier theory that ancient mounds in the United States were built by a "lost race", and shows they were built by the ancestors of modern Native Americans.

== Events ==
- E. A. Wallis Budge appointed Keeper of Egyptian and Assyrian Antiquities at the British Museum.
- Ernst Förstemann deciphers the Maya numbering systems.
- A marble sculpture from Prusias ad Hypium in Turkey is installed in the new Imperial Museum, Istanbul.

== Births ==
- February 19 - Emil Forrer, Swiss Assyriologist and Hittitologist (d. 1986)
- June 5 - Giuseppe Tucci, Italian Orientalist (d. 1984)
- November 3 - Winifred Lamb, English archaeologist (d. 1963)
- December 15 - Raissa Calza, née Gourevitch, Ukrainian-born ballet dancer, later archaeologist of Ancient Rome (d. 1979)
- December 28 - Oscar Broneer, Swedish American archaeologist of Ancient Greece (d. 1992)

== Deaths ==
- July 5 - Austen Henry Layard, French-born British archaeologist of Iran (b. 1817)
- September 20 - Giovanni Battista de Rossi, Italian archaeologist (b. 1822)
