= 1881 in archaeology =

Below are notable events in archaeology that occurred in 1881.

== Explorations ==
- Alfred Maudslay begins his thorough examination of Quiriguá.

== Excavations ==
- Timgad, Algeria, is excavated.
- The excavations at Olympia, Greece which began in 1875 and were led by Ernst Curtius end.
- Mount Nemrut, Turkey, is excavated by German engineer Karl Sester.
- Great Pyramid of Cholula in Mexico is investigated by Swiss-born American archaeologist Adolph Bandelier.
- Pyramid of Unas in Egypt is investigated by French archaeologist Gaston Maspero.

== Finds ==
- February – the Domvs Romana in Melite in Malta is discovered during landscaping
- March – Augustus Pitt Rivers finds palaeolithic flints in concreted gravels of the Nile terraces near Thebes.
- July 6 – "Official" discovery of the Royal Cache collective tomb (TT320, previously known as DB320) at Deir el-Bahari in Egypt, containing eleven pharaohs (including Ramesses II) and dozens of other royal individuals. The contents are removed within 48 hours.
- Capt. H. L. Wells, RE, finds Qadamgah in Fars province, Persia (Iran).
- The birch bark Bakhshali manuscript, incorporating perhaps the earliest known use of mathematical zero, is unearthed near Bakhshali in British India.

== Publications ==
- John Evans – The Ancient Bronze Implements, Weapons and Ornaments of Great Britain and Ireland.
- H. A. Fletcher – "The archaeology of the west Cumberland iron trade". Transactions of the Cumberland & Westmorland Archaeological Society 5:5–21.
- Possible earliest use of the term "Industrial archaeology" in the English language.

== Other events ==
- February 22 – 'Cleopatra's Needle' erected in Central Park, New York.

== Births ==
- December 19 – Hetty Goldman, American archaeologist (d. 1972)

== Deaths ==
- January 24 – Frances Stackhouse Acton, English botanist, archaeologist, artist and writer (b. 1794)
- May 19 – Joseph Barnard Davis, English craniologist (b. 1801)
- June 21 – Ferdinand Keller, Swiss archaeologist (b. 1800)
