= 1890 in archaeology =

Below are notable events in archaeology that occurred in 1890.

== Explorations ==
- Alfred Maudslay begins his documentation of the Maya ruins of Palenque.

== Excavations ==
- Arthur Evans excavates a Belgae cemetery site at Aylesford.
- J.R. Mortimer begins excavations at Duggleby Howe.
- The Society of Antiquaries of London begins its excavations of Calleva Atrebatum (Silchester Roman Town).
- Merv.
- Flinders Petrie excavates at Tell el-Hesi, Palestine (mistakenly identified as Lachish), the first scientific excavation of an archaeological site in the Holy Land, during which he discovers how tells are formed.

== Finds ==
- Saltley handaxe excavated in Birmingham, the first paleolithic human artefact found in The Midlands of England.
- Hermes Criophorus statue found in Troezen, Greece.

== Births ==
- April 21: Benno Landsberger, German Assyriologist (d. 1968)
- September 10: Mortimer Wheeler, British archaeologist (d. 1976)

== Deaths ==
- July 14: John Clayton, English antiquarian (b. 1792)
- August 2: Charles Roach Smith, British archaeologist; co-founder of the British Archaeological Association (b. 1807)
- October 28: Jean Baptiste Holzmayer, German archaeologist (b. 1839)
- December 26: Heinrich Schliemann, German archaeologist, excavator of Troy (b. 1822)
