= 1892 in archaeology =

Below are notable events in archaeology that occurred in 1892.

== Explorations ==
- August - Survey of Coldrum Long Barrow in south east England.

== Excavations ==
- Excavations to uncover the fortifications of Thebes, Greece, are begun by lawyer Eustratios Kalopais.

== Finds ==
- Glastonbury Lake Village discovered by Arthur Bulleid in the Somerset Levels of England.
- Gough's Cave discovered in Cheddar Gorge (Somerset), England.
- "Venus of Brassempouy" discovered in France.
- The second of the Caryatids of Eleusis discovered in Eleusis, Greece.

== Miscellaneous ==
- The American School of Classical Studies at Athens is founded.
- Sir William Ridgeway is elected to the Disney Professorship of Archaeology in the University of Cambridge.

== Births ==
- April 14 - V. Gordon Childe, Australian-born prehistorian (died 1957).
- May 5 - Dorothy Garrod, English Palaeolithic archaeologist of the Near East (died 1968).

== Deaths ==
- April 15 - Amelia Edwards, English Egyptologist and fiction writer (born 1831)
