= 1887 in archaeology =

Below are notable events in archaeology that occurred in 1887.

== Excavations ==
- June–July - Carl Humann works at Hierapolis.

== Finds ==
- A local woman digging for sebakh at Amarna uncovers a cache of over 300 cuneiform tablets containing diplomatic correspondence of the Pharaohs, now commonly known as the Amarna Letters.
- German submersible Brandtaucher, which sank on trial in the port of Kiel in 1851, is discovered, and on July 5 is raised.

== Publications ==
- William Ivison Macadam - "Notes on the Ancient Iron Industry of Scotland", Proceedings of the Society of Antiquaries of Scotland.
- Augustus Pitt Rivers - Excavations in Cranborne Chase, vol. 1

== Miscellaneous ==
- The Reverend George Brown is elected to the Disney Professorship of Archaeology in the University of Cambridge.

== Births ==
- January 27 - Carl Blegen, American archaeologist of Greece (d. 1971)
- October 27 - Neil Judd, American archaeologist (d. 1976)

== Deaths ==
- September 1 - Jules Desnoyers, French geologist and archaeologist (b. 1800)
