= 1828 in archaeology =

List of years in archaeology	(table)
- … 1818; 1819; 1820; 1821; 1822; 1823; 1824; 1825; 1826; 1827; 1828; 1829; 1830; 1831; 1832; 1833; 1834; 1835; 1836; 1837; 1838 …
- In science 1825 1826 1827 1828 1829 1830 1831
- Art; Archaeology; Architecture; Literature; Music; Philosophy; Science; +...

1828 in archaeology

== Events ==
- The 'Metternich Stela' is presented by Muhammad Ali of Egypt to Prince Metternich.

== Finds ==
- The Crondall Hoard, a hoard of one hundred and one old French and Anglo-Saxon coins, is found in the village of Crondall in the English county of Hampshire.

== Publications ==
- Prussian Academy of Sciences begins publication of the Corpus Inscriptionum Graecum under the editorship of August Böckh.

== Births ==
- May 2 - Désiré Charnay, French archaeologist and explorer (d. 1915)
- August 18 - Jakob Messikommer, Swiss archaeologist (d. 1917)
- Frank Calvert, British archaeologist (d. 1908)

== Deaths ==
- March 31 - Charles "Hindoo" Stuart, Anglo-Irish British East India Company officer and collector of Hindu antiquities (b. c.1758)

== See also ==
- List of years in archaeology
- 1827 in archaeology
- 1829 in archaeology
