= 1823 in archaeology =

List of years in archaeology	(table)
- … 1813; 1814; 1815; 1816; 1817; 1818; 1819; 1820; 1821; 1822; 1823; 1824; 1825; 1826; 1827; 1828; 1829; 1830; 1831; 1832; 1833 …
- In science 1820 1821 1822 1823 1824 1825 1826
- Art; Archaeology; Architecture; Literature; Music; Philosophy; Science; +...

The year 1823 in archaeology involved some significant events.

== Excavations ==
- Roman tombs near Lorium, Etruria (1823–4).
- Roman villa near Bramdean, Hampshire, England.

== Finds ==
- January - In a cave on the Gower Peninsula of south Wales, Rev. William Buckland discovers the "Red Lady of Paviland", the first identification of a prehistoric (male) human burial. The bones are discovered with those of the woolly mammoth, proving that the two had coexisted, although Buckland dates the human remains as Roman.
- Summer - Smythe's Megalith, a Neolithic tomb, is discovered in Kent, England, and excavated by local antiquarian Clement Smythe.
- Borough Hill Roman villa in the midlands of England is discovered by archaeologist, George Baker.
- The Caergwrle Bowl, a decorated Middle Bronze Age artefact, is discovered in north east Wales.
- The Ormside bowl, a gilded silver Anglo-Saxon double-bowl, dating from the mid-8th century, is found in Great Ormside, Cumbria.

== Events ==
- Rev. Dr. Henry Duncan completes reconstruction of the Northumbrian Ruthwell Cross in Scotland.

== Births ==
- June 7 - Giuseppe Fiorelli, Italian archaeologist of Pompeii (died 1896)
- November 17 - John Evans, English archaeologist (died 1908)

== Deaths ==
- December 3 - Giovanni Battista Belzoni, Italian explorer of Egyptian antiquities (born 1778)

== See also ==
- Ancient Egypt / Egyptology
