= 1811 in archaeology =

List of years in archaeology	(table)
- … 1801; 1802; 1803; 1804; 1805; 1806; 1807; 1808; 1809; 1810; 1811; 1812; 1813; 1814; 1815; 1816; 1817; 1818; 1819; 1820; 1821 …
- In science 1808 1809 1810 1811 1812 1813 1814
- Art; Archaeology; Architecture; Literature; Music; Philosophy; Science; +...

The year 1811 in archaeology involved some significant events.

== Excavations ==
- Colosseum, Rome: The arena substructure is partly excavated during 1810-1814.
- In Italy, detailed excavations continue at Pompeii.
- The remains of the villa of Pliny, named Villa di Pino, are excavated during 1802-1819 (following the excavations of 1713).
- The Bignor Roman Villa is excavated between 1811 and 1819.

== Births ==
- Christian Maclagan, Scottish antiquary (d. 1901)

== See also ==
- Roman Forum - excavations.
