= 1802 in archaeology =

List of years in archaeology	(table)
- … 1792; 1793; 1794; 1795; 1796; 1797; 1798; 1799; 1800; 1801; 1802; 1803; 1804; 1805; 1806; 1807; 1808; 1809; 1810; 1811; 1812 …
- In science 1799 1800 1801 1802 1803 1804 1805
- Art; Archaeology; Architecture; Literature; Music; Philosophy; Science; +...

The year 1802 in archaeology involved some significant events.

== Finds ==
- May 24/25 - A loculus in the Catacomb of Priscilla in Rome is located and opened, revealing remains believed at this time to be of the early Christian martyr Philomena.

== Publications ==
- Vivant Denon - Voyage dans la Basse et la Haute Egypte pendant les campagnes du général Bonaparte; includes first publication of the Dendera zodiac.
- Johann Jahn - Biblische Archäologie.

== Other events ==
- The Rosetta Stone arrives at the British Museum and first goes on public display.
- Georg Friedrich Grotefend makes the first decipherment of cuneiform.

== Births ==
- Juan Galindo, explorer and writer of early accounts of the ruins of the Maya civilization (d. 1839).
