= 1760s in archaeology =

| List of years in archaeology | (table) |
- … 1750; 1751; 1752; 1753; 1754; 1755; 1756; 1757; 1758; 1759; 1760; 1761; 1762; 1763; 1764; 1765; 1766; 1767; 1768; 1769; 1770 …
- In science 1757 1758 1759 1760 1761 1762 1763
- Art; Archaeology; Architecture; Literature; Music; Philosophy; Science; +...

The decade of the 1760s in archaeology involved some significant events.

== Explorations ==
- 1764: First systematic mapping of the Antonine Wall by William Roy.

== Excavations ==
- Formal excavations continue at Pompeii.
- 1757: Rev. Bryan Faussett begins excavations at Anglo-Saxon cemeteries in Kent, England.

== Finds ==
- 1761-1767: Carsten Niebuhr transcribes the cuneiform inscriptions at Persepolis.
- 1765: Nathaniel Davison discovers a stress-relieving chamber (Davison's chamber) above the Kings chamber in the Great Pyramid of Giza.

== Publications ==
- 1762: James "Athenian" Stuart and Nicholas Revett's Antiquities of Athens.
- 1764:
  - Robert Adam's Ruins of the Palace of the Emperor Diocletian at Spalatro in Dalmatia.
  - Johann Joachim Winckelmann's Geschichte der Kunst des Alterthums ("History of Ancient Art").

== Other events ==
- 1764: French scholar Jean-Jacques Barthélemy deciphers the Phoenician language using the inscriptions on the Cippi of Melqart from Malta.

== Births ==
- 1760:
  - January 6 - Richard Polwhele, Cornish antiquarian (d. 1838)
  - June 8 - Karl Böttiger, German archaeologist (d. 1835)
- 1763:
  - November 19 - Karl Ludwig Fernow, German art critic and archaeologist (d. 1808)
  - Samuel Lysons, English antiquarian (d. 1819)
- 1766: March 16? - Jean-Frédéric Waldeck, French antiquarian, cartographer, artist and explorer (d. 1875)
- 1769:
  - March 23 - William Smith, English geologist (d. 1839)
  - August 23 - Georges Cuvier, French naturalist, zoologist and paleontologist (d. 1832)
  - September 14 - Alexander von Humboldt, Prussian explorer and writer (d. 1859)

== Deaths ==
- 1765:
  - March 3 - William Stukeley, English antiquarian (b. 1689)
  - September 5 - Anne Claude de Caylus, French archaeologist (d. 1765)
- 1767: June 17 - Jean-Baptiste Greppo, French canon and archaeologist (b. 1712)
- 1768: June 8 - Johann Joachim Winckelmann, German art critic and archaeologist (b. 1717)

| Preceded by 1750s in archaeology | Archaeology timeline 1760s | Succeeded by 1770s in archaeology |
