= 1750s in archaeology =

The decade of the 1750s in archaeology involved some significant events.

== Explorations ==
- 1757: Robert Adam surveys the ruins of Diocletian's Palace at Spalato in Dalmatia.

== Excavations ==
- 1750s: Formal excavations continue at Pompeii and at Herculaneum including discovery of the Villa of the Papyri and Herculaneum papyri.
- 1753: Botanist Vitaliano Donati is commissioned by King Charles Emmanuel III of Sardinia to travel to Egypt and acquire items from its past. He returns with 300 pieces recovered from Karnak and Qift which become the nucleus of the Museo Egizio in Turin.
- 1755: At Bath, England, when the Priory or Abbey house is demolished and the foundations are cleared, stone coffins, bones of various animals, and other things are found. Upon digging further, hot mineral waters gush forth and interrupt the work: the old Roman sewer had been found, and the water is drained off. Foundations of regular buildings are traced leading to excavation of a great bath, afterwards called Lucas's Bath, when the eastern wall of the great Hall is opened.
- 1757: Rev. Bryan Faussett begins excavating Anglo-Saxon cemeteries in Kent, England (continues to 1773).

== Finds ==
- 1754: A hoard of about 207 Roman gold coins (and one silver coin) are discovered at Menzelen just outside Xanten on the lower Rhine.
- 1755: Several sepulchral inscriptions and figures, in bas-relief, are discovered at Bonn in Lower Germany.
- 1756: The Gallarus Oratory on the Dingle Peninsula of Ireland is first reported, by antiquary Charles Smith.

== Publications ==
- 1753: Robert Wood's The ruins of Palmyra; otherwise Tedmor in the desart published in English and French.
- 1755: Frederic Louis Norden's Voyage d'Egypte et de Nubie published posthumously in Copenhagen.
- 1757: Robert Wood's The ruins of Balbec, otherwise Heliopolis in Coelosyria published in English and French.

== Other events ==
- 1751: The Society of Antiquaries of London receives its Royal charter.
- 1754: French scholar Jean-Jacques Barthélemy deciphers Palmyrene inscriptions, the first successful decipherment of a previously "dead" ancient script in modern scholarship.

== Births ==
- 1754: William Cunnington, pioneering English antiquarian and archaeologist of the late eighteenth and early nineteenth century (d. 1810).
- 1755: May 16 - Honoré Flaugergues, French astronomer and archaeologist (d. 1830 or 1835).
- 1758: December 9 - Richard Colt Hoare, English antiquarian and archaeologist (d. 1838).

== Deaths ==
- 1755: February 11 - Francesco Scipione, marchese di Maffei, Italian archaeologist (b. 1675).

== Notes ==
Preceded by 1740s in archaeology	Archaeology timeline 1750s	Succeeded by 1760s in archaeology
