= Kingittorsuaq =

Kingittorsuaq (old spelling: Kingigtorssuaq) is two localities in Greenland:

- Kingittorsuaq Island in the Upernavik Archipelago where the Kingittorsuaq Runestone was found.
- A mountain near Nuuk (Hjortetakken), see List of mountains in Greenland.
