= 1720s in archaeology =

The decade of the 1720s in archaeology involved some significant events.

== Explorations ==
- 1722: Dutch explorer Jacob Roggeveen arrives at Easter Island.

== Excavations ==
- Formal excavations continue at Pompeii.

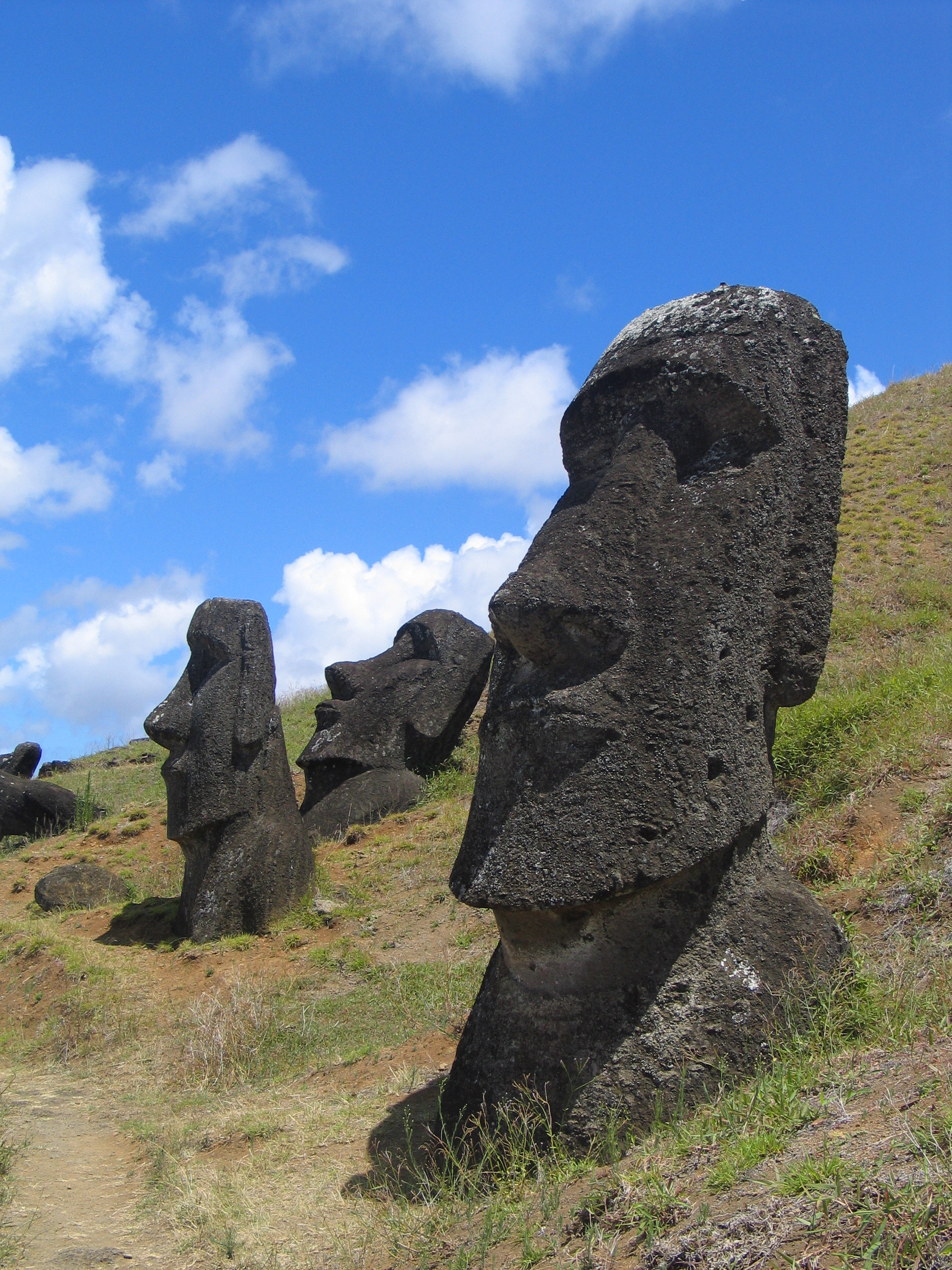
1722: Easter Island.

== Finds ==
- 1723: Roman inscribed stone found in Chichester, England.
- 1725: Rudge Cup found in England.
- 1727: Gilt bronze head from cult statue of Sulis Minerva from the Temple at Bath, England, found by workmen excavating a sewer.

== Publications ==
- 1723: Antoine de Jussieu publishes De l'Origine et des usages de la Pierre de Foudre on the origins of fossils, prehistoric stone tools and meteorites.

== Births ==
- 1721: Nicholas Revett, English architect (d. 1804)
- 1726: October 12 - Pierre Henri Larcher, French classical scholar (d. 1812)
- 1729: September 25 - Christian Gottlob Heyne, German archaeologist (d. 1812)

Preceded by 1710s in archaeology	Archaeology timeline 1720s	Succeeded by 1730s in archaeology
