= 1839 in archaeology =

Below are notable events in archaeology that occurred in 1839.

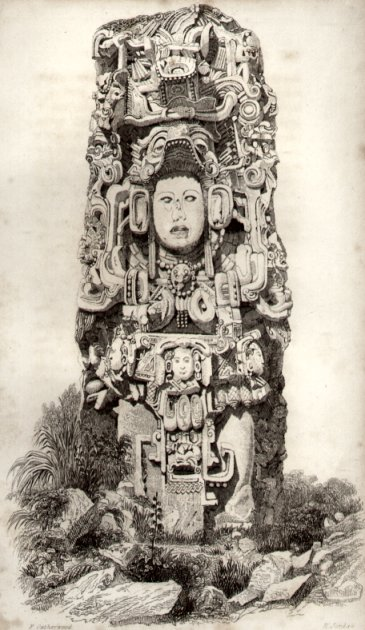
Stela at Copan as drawn by Catherwood

== Explorations ==
- John Lloyd Stephens and Frederick Catherwood explore the Maya ruins of Copan.

== Excavations ==
- English archeologist A. H. Layard begins excavations of Nineveh.
- First excavation of Roman villa at Rudston in the East Riding of Yorkshire, England.
- First excavation of Roman villa at Oplontis in Italy begins.

== Births ==
- January 4 - Carl Humann, German archaeologist (d. 1896)
- July 12 - Jean Baptiste Holzmayer, German archaeologist (d. 1890)

== Deaths ==
- August 28 - William Smith, English geologist (b. 1769)
- Juan Galindo, Irish-born Central American soldier, governor and explorer (b. 1802)

== See also ==
- List of years in archaeology
