= 1710s in archaeology =

The decade of the 1710s in archaeology involved some significant events.

== Excavations ==
- Formal excavations continue at Pompeii.

== Finds ==
- 1710: A few remains of the Temple of Apollo are discovered in Mdina, Malta. Most of the marble blocks were later sculpted into decorative elements for new buildings.
- 1713: Gold aureus coins found in Transylvania provide the only known evidence for Roman usurper Sponsianus.
- 1719: December 2 - Workers in Falun Mine, Sweden, find the apparently petrified body of "Fet-Mats" Israelsson (d. 1677), in a flooded part of the copper workings.

== Publications ==
- 1717: Michele Mercati's Metallotheca is published, 124 years after his death.
- 1719: Natural History and Antiquities of Surrey by Richard Rawlinson.

== Births ==
- 1712: 17 May - Jean-Baptiste Greppo, French canon and archaeologist (d. 1767)
- 1713: James 'Athenian' Stuart, Scottish archaeologist and architect (d. 1788)
- 1716: January 20 - Jean-Jacques Barthélemy, French archaeologist (d. 1795)
- 1717: December 9 - Johann Joachim Winckelmann, German art critic and archaeologist (d. 1768)

== Deaths ==
- 1715: February 17 - Antoine Galland, French orientalist (b. 1646)

Preceded by 1700s in archaeology	Archaeology timeline 1710s	Succeeded by 1720s in archaeology
