= 1824 in archaeology =

The year 1824 in archaeology involved some significant events.

== Excavations ==
- In Egypt, the tombs at Thebes were excavated (again in 1827-28).
- Near Mexico City, the courtyard of the Great Temple at Tenochtitlan was excavated.
- At Hastings, the interior of the castle was excavated, revealing the chapel, chapter house, etc.

== Finds ==
- At Hastings, when the interior of the castle was excavated, the chapel was discovered, with the chapter house and other offices.
- Slack Roman fort in Yorkshire (England) discovered.
- The Kingittorsuaq Runestone was found in a group of three cairns that formed an equilateral triangle on top of the mountain on a small Kingittorsuaq Island in the south-central part of the Upernavik Archipelago.

== Publications ==
- Jean-François Champollion, Précis du système hiéroglyphique.

== Births ==
- August 2 - Frederick Spurrell

== See also ==
- Ancient Egypt / Egyptology
