= Kaarma-Kirikuküla =

Village in Estonia

- Village
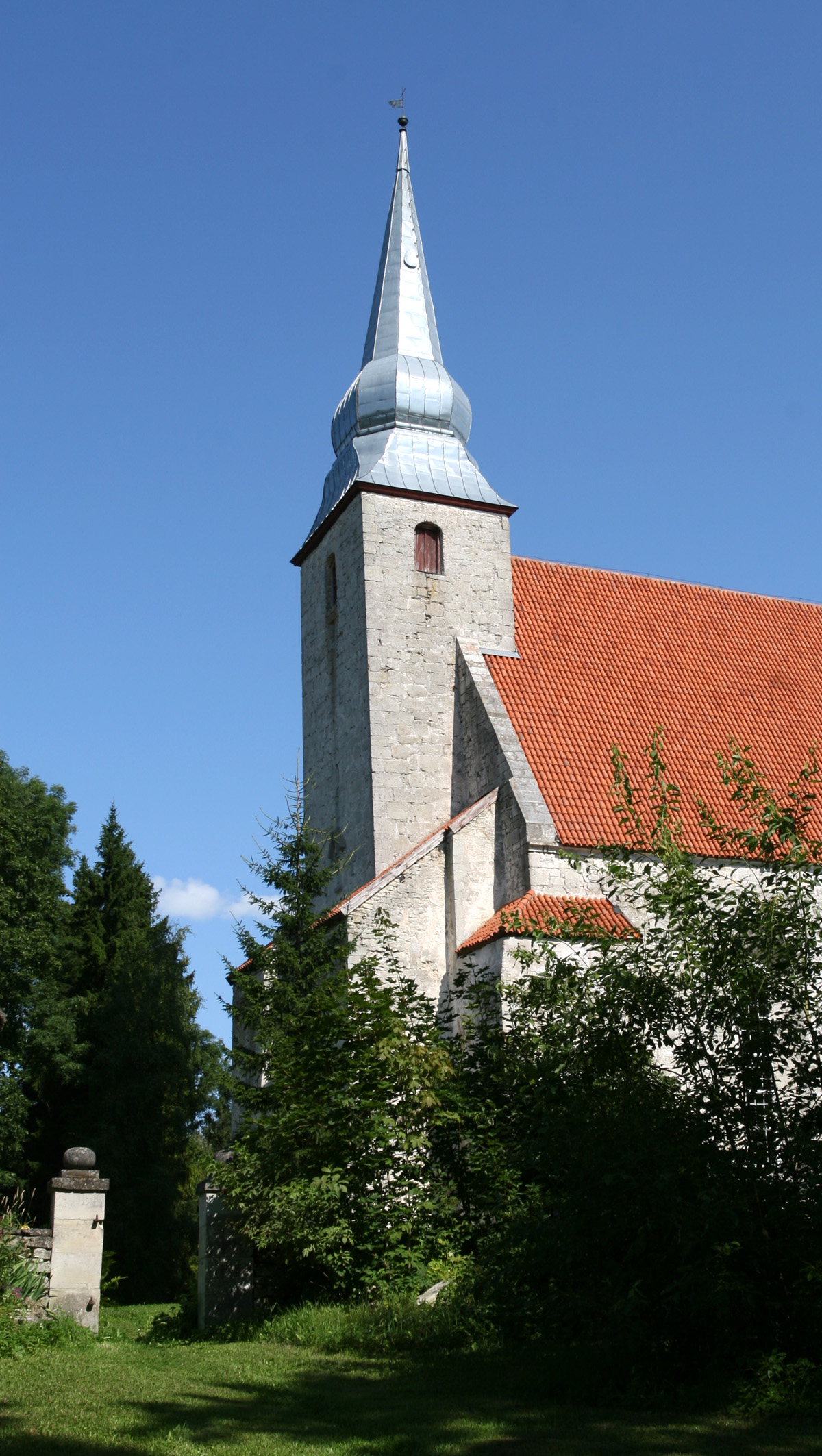
- Kaarma Church in Kirikuküla

- Location in Estonia
- Coordinates: 58°20′50″N 22°30′39″E
- Country: Estonia
- County: Saare County
- Municipality: Saaremaa Parish

Population (2011 Census)
  - Total: 18

Kaarma-Kirikuküla is a village in Saaremaa Parish, Saare County in western Estonia. As of the 2011 census, the settlement's population was 18.

The diplomat, linguist, and folklorist Oskar Kallas (1868–1946) and his brother Rudolf Kallas were born in Kirikuküla as sons of the local vicar.

Before the administrative reform in 2017, the village was in Lääne-Saare Parish.

== Kaarma Church ==
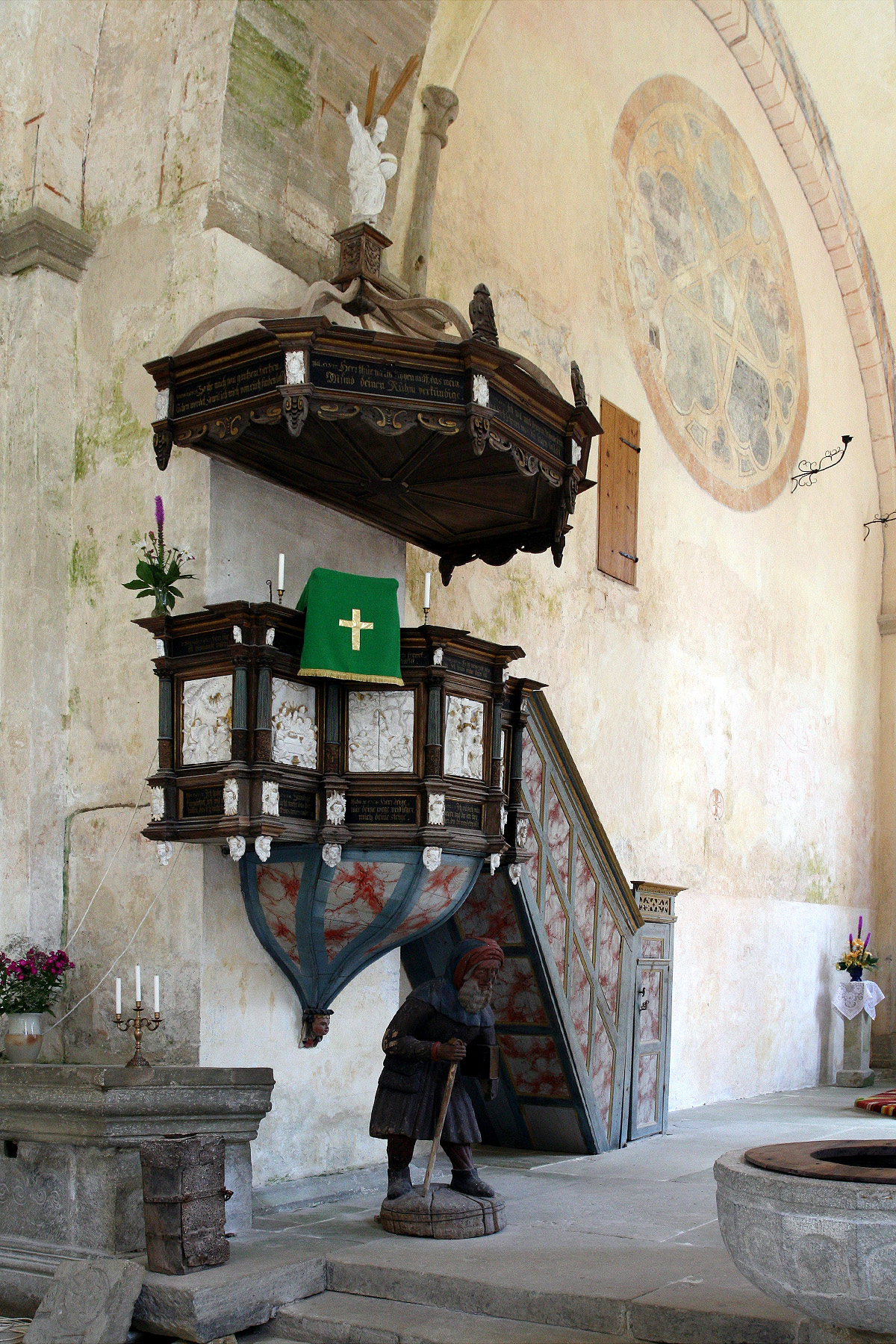
Interior of the church

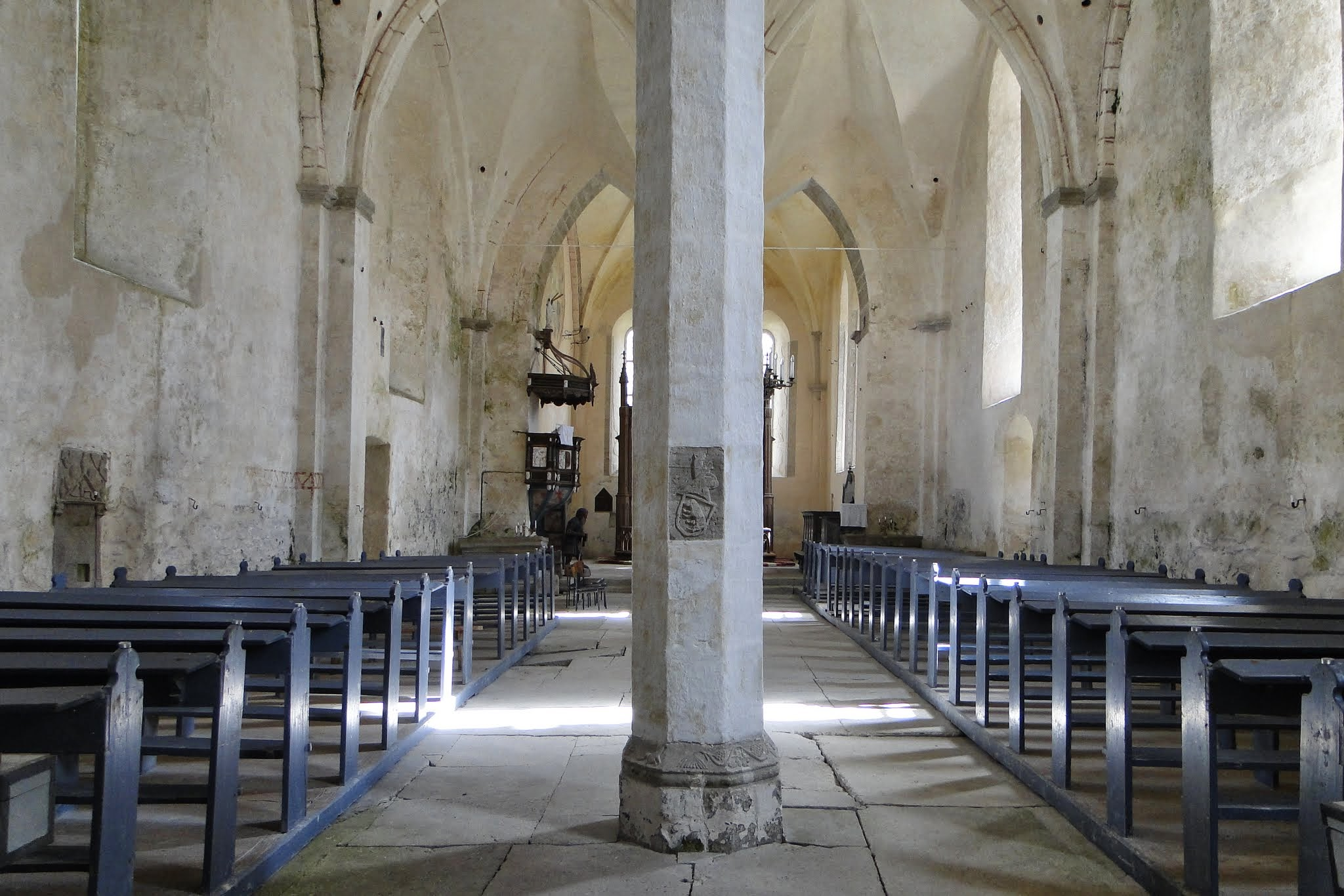
Interior of the Kaarma Church

Kaarma Church in Kirikuküla village, originally dedicated to saints Peter and Paul, was built in 1260s, probably sometime after the 1261 rebellion. It is a fine example of medieval church architecture in Saaremaa. It was built in an early Gothic style, with some details still in the Romanesque style. The church is a typical example of the type built in the Bishopric of Saare-Lääne, with a simple nave and a narrow choir. It was rebuilt subsequently during the whole Middle Ages, partly as an effort to steady the church, which is built on unstable ground. The steeple dates from the 15th century, as do the present vaults.

An oddity is the room with a fireplace built above the vestry. Originally, this room may have served as a refuge in times of trouble, but later probably served visiting pilgrims from nearby Gotland. Similar arrangements are found in other medieval churches on Saaremaa.

Of the interior, the murals, the font and a wooden sculpture of St. Simon of Cyrene are all medieval. A large set of finely carved late Gothic wooden sculptures, at least some of which were possibly made by Lübeck master carver Henning von der Heide, were originally also displayed in the church, but are today housed in Saaremaa Museum in Kuressaare Castle. The pillars of the church are decorated with stone carvings from the 15th century, displaying a plain, primitive and evocative style that is clearly related to stone carvings from the same time from Padise Abbey and the medieval Dominican cloister in Tallinn. The pulpit (1645) and the neo-Gothic altarpiece decorated by Otto Friedrich Theodor von Möller are later, also noteworthy interior details.

== Kaarma ring fort ==
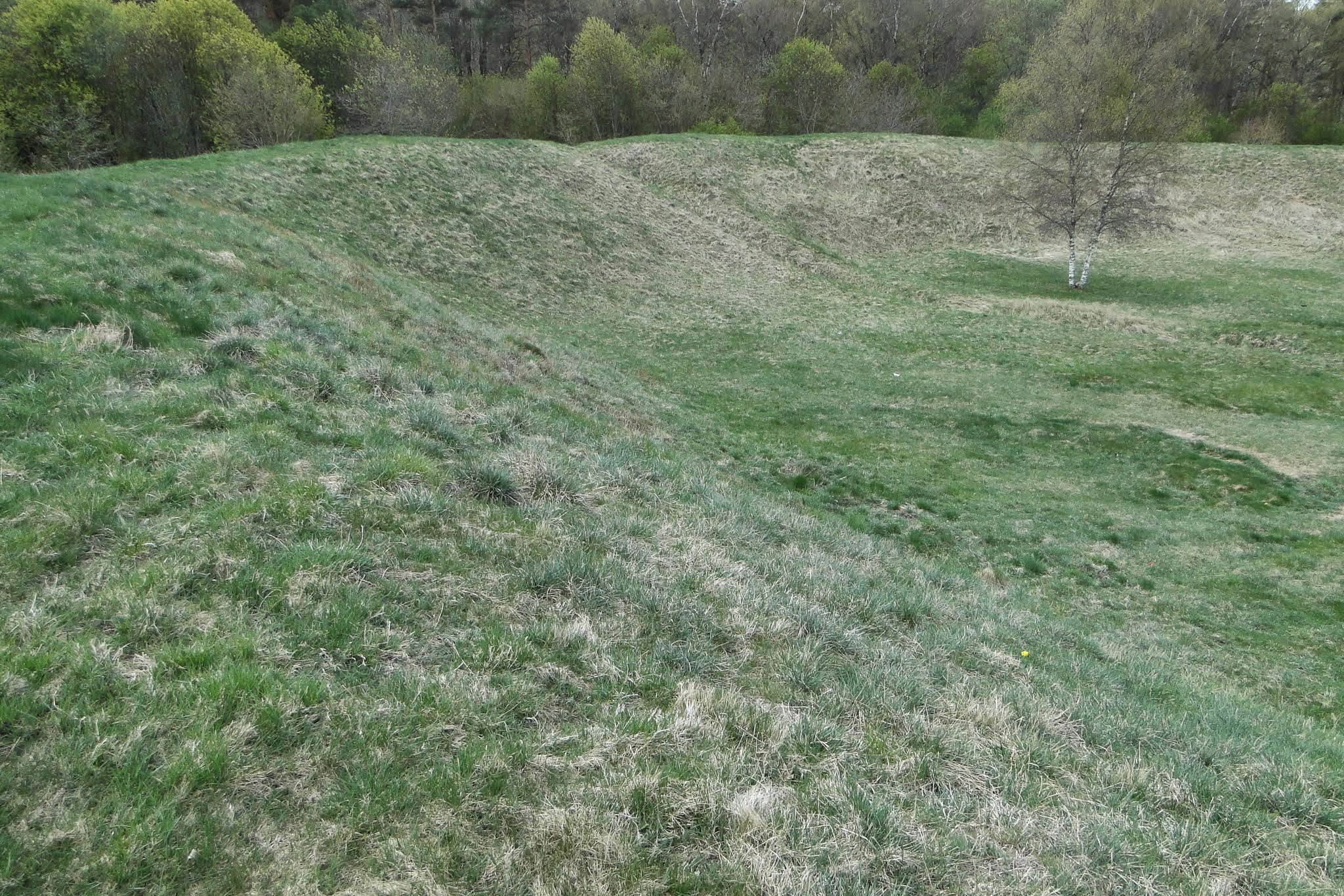
Kaarma ring fort

Kaarma ring fort is located about a hundred meters from the church. It was first mentioned in the Early Livonian Rhymed Chronicle as a main Oeselian stronghold during the 1260-1261 rebellion. It was captured, after a bloody battle, by the combined forces of the Livonian Order, the Bishopric of Dorpat, the Bishopric of Ösel–Wiek, and Danish troops in 1261. Currently visible are a depression at the original location of the well, and the locations of the fort's gates at the north-western and north-eastern corners of the wall. Jean Baptiste Holzmayer did some excavating at the fort's location in 1860, but overall there has been very little archaeological exploration.
