= Narsaq stick =

An illustration of the four sides of the Narsaq stick by runologist Lisbeth M. Imer

The Narsaq stick (Note: Also known under the designations GR 76 and Narsaq Ø17a 1.) is a pine twig inscribed with runic symbols dating to ca. 1000. The stick was discovered in Narsaq in Greenland in 1953 and was quickly seen as a significant find, as it was the first Viking Age runic inscription discovered in Greenland. The stick has two sentences of ambiguous and obscure runic text. One suggested interpretation of the first sentence is "He who sat on a tub saw a tub" while another is "On the sea, the sea, the sea is the ambush of the Æsir". The other sentence refers to a maiden named "Bibrau" who may be sitting on the sky. The runic alphabet is carved on one side of the stick in a short-twig form. Yet another side has a series of carefully carved symbols of unclear meaning, possibly cipher runes or some sort of tally.

Scholars have suggested various possibilities for the purpose of the stick. Relatively mundane ideas include that the text is a play on words, a pedagogical exercise in runic ambiguity or a riddle. Magical and religious purposes have also been suggested, with the stick being a pagan plea for protection against the dangers of the sea or possibly a case of love magic. Various parallels have been suggested, particularly with runic inscriptions from Bergen in Norway.

== Discovery and archaeological context ==
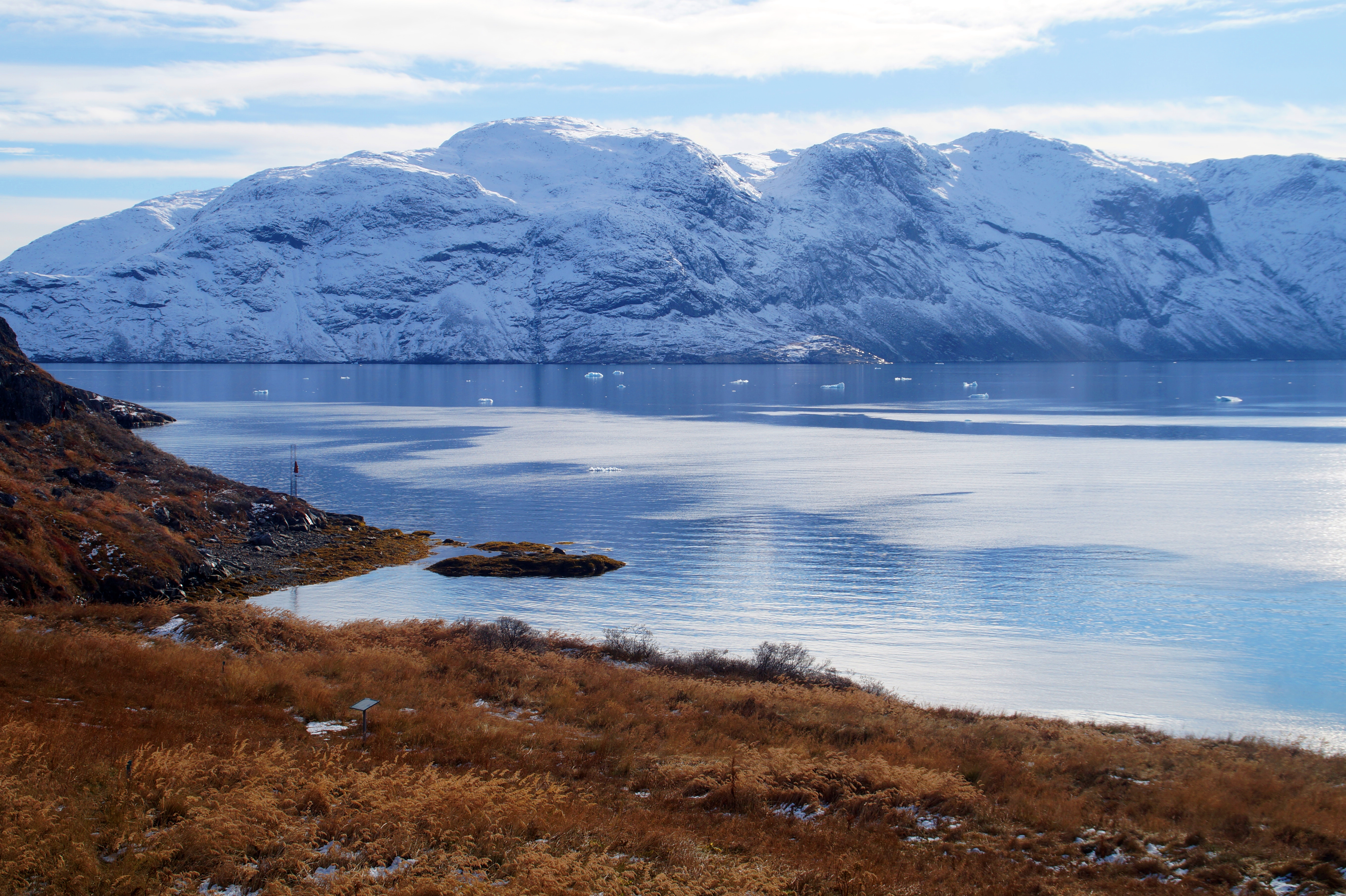
The site where the Narsaq stick was discovered. A sign gives information on the archaeological excavations.

Remains of old habitation in Narsaq were first discovered by Aage Roussell in 1935. The site was placed under conservation order but in 1945 the restrictions were lifted since surface examination of the ruins had not indicated that they were especially valuable. In 1953 a local man, K. N. Christensen, was collecting mud for agriculture at the site of the ruins. He discovered artifacts made of bone and wood in the mud, including a runic stick. Christensen stopped digging and sent the artifacts to the National Museum of Denmark.

In the summer of 1954, archaeologist Christen Leif Pagh Vebæk undertook excavations at the site and found various remains, including arrowheads which could be dated to the oldest period of Norse settlement in Greenland. Further excavations were conducted in 1958 and 1962 and smaller-scale studies took place in 1998–2005. Radiocarbon analysis of the site confirms that the oldest layer dates to ca. 1000. The stick was found in the middle of the living area of the farm. Five other objects with runic symbols have been discovered at the site, all with short and difficult to interpret inscriptions.

The Narsaq stick was the first Viking Age runic inscription to be discovered in Greenland. Writing in 1961, runologist Erik Moltke described the find as "epoch-making" (Note: Danish epokegørende.) and more important than even the Kingittorsuaq stone.

== Description ==
The pine stick is natural and only slightly worked. Erik Moltke argued that it must have been carved in Greenland since only in a tree-poor country would a self-respecting rune-carver deign to use such a wretched piece of wood. When found, it was broken into two pieces but this did not cause much damage to the runes. The stick was later glued back together. It has a length of 42.6 centimetres (16.8 in) and the broader sides have a width of 2.4 centimetres (0.94 in) at the widest.

The four sides were labeled A, B, C and D by Moltke. Sides A and C are the broad sides and sides B and D are the narrow sides. (Note: Imer has another enumeration of the sides; Imer-A is Moltke-A, Imer-B is Moltke-D, Imer-C is Moltke-B, Imer-D is Moltke-C.) Side A has an inscription with linguistic content and Side C has what looks like cipher runes. These are both elegantly cut. Side B has the younger fuþark alphabet. It uses the same form of runes as side A but may have been cut by a less skilled hand. Some additional marks on two of the sides appear to be mere scribbles or tests. The inscription on side A uses short-twig runes but the form of the s rune is unusual, it has the form normally used for the R rune.

The runes on side A apparently form two sentences each starting with an × sign. The inscription reads as follows: × ą : sa : sa : sa : is : ąsa : sat × bibrau : haitir : mar : su : is : sitr : ą : blanị The final i is uncertain and it is possible that something is lost at the end.

== The first sentence ==
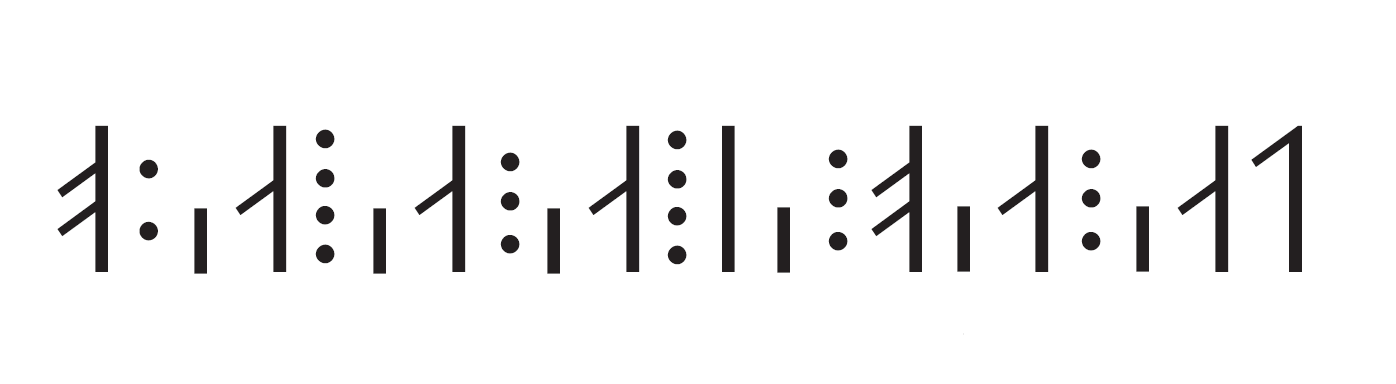
The ambiguous first sentence: ą : sa : sa : sa : is : ąsa : sat with an unusual type of s rune.

The first sentence (ą : sa : sa : sa : is : ąsa : sat) is highly ambiguous. Runic sa can stand for a number of Old Norse words, including the pronoun sá ("that one"), the verb sá ("saw") and the noun forms sá ("tub") and sæ ("sea"). There are similarities between this sentence and runic inscriptions from Norway, in particular B 566 from Bergen which reads in part huatsasaerisasasiksasaerisasa and has been taken to mean "What did he see who looked into the tub? He saw himself, he who looked into the tub." (Hvat sá sá, er í sá sá? Sik sá sá, er í sá sá.) The text is then a play on three sá homonyms. Texts similar to that on B 566 are also found on B 617 from Bergen and A 162 from Trondheim and there is a further possible parallel on a bone discovered in Sigtuna in Sweden in 1995.

An interpretation of the first sentence of the Narsaq stick as a play on homonyms was first proposed by Jón Helgason who took the sentence to mean "He who sat on a tub saw a tub." (Á sá sá sá es á sá sat.), noting as a parallel an Icelandic quatrain which plays on sá homonyms. This interpretation has been called "very convincing" (Note: Swedish mycket övertygande.) and "the most appealing". (Note: Norwegian det mest tiltalende.)

Other interpretations have been proposed. Erik Moltke took the first sentence to mean "On the sea, the sea, the sea is the ambush of the Æsir." (Á sæ, sæ, sæ es Ása sát), indicating that the sea is treacherous for anyone not favored by the gods. Helgi Guðmundsson further suggested that the gods in question would be Ægir and Rán and that sát should be understood as "dwelling place". Another proposal was offered by Ólafur Halldórsson: "He who did not see the sea saw the sea." (Á sæ sá sá es á sæ sáat). In this interpretation the sentence is a riddle with the answer 'mirage' given in the second sentence.

== The second sentence ==
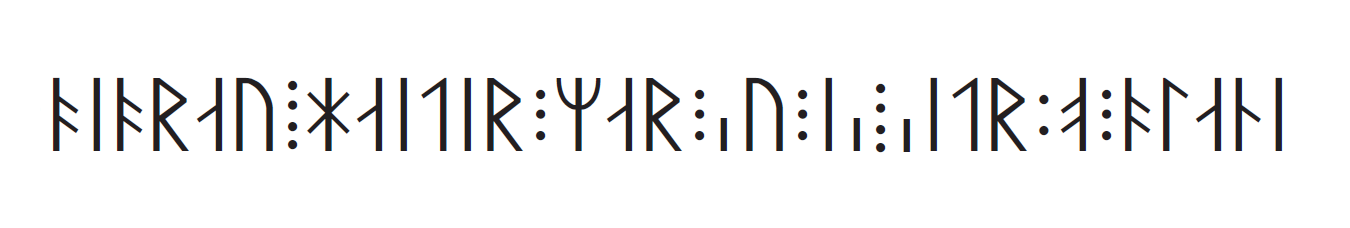
The second sentence: bibrau : haitir : mar : su : is : sitr : ą : blanị. The a and b runes have switched places compared to more common short-twig usage.

The second sentence (bibrau : haitir : mar : su : is : sitr : ą : blanị) is mostly straightforward but the first and last words are difficult. The sentence can be translated as "bibrau is the name of the maiden who sits on blanị" (bibrau heitir mær sú es sitr á blanị). The word or name bibrau is unknown elsewhere. Moltke took its first component to be bif- ("movement" or "shaking") as in Bifröst and gave Bifrau, Bifrey and Bifró as possible renderings. The b rune is then used for a sound more often represented by the f rune. This is a relatively archaic feature, found in some North Atlantic inscriptions such as the Ballaugh stone cross. Ólafur Halldórsson suggested the rendering Bifbrá which he took to mean "mirage" like Icelandic tíbrá and Faroese lognbrá and to answer what he saw as a riddle in the first sentence. Helgi Guðmundsson saw Bifrǫ́ as the most likely option and points out that Norwegian and Swedish rå is a word for vættir or mythical beings.

The ending of the word blanị is uncertain and Moltke suggested blanum as a reconstruction. He took this to be dative of Bláinn, one of the names of the primordial giant out of whose skull the blue sky was made. The sense would be that the maiden sits on the blue sky. Helgi Guðmundsson argues that the expected dative of Bláinn is Bláni and that this fits well with what can be seen of the runic word. The sense "blue sky" has been adapted, with some hesitation, by several scholars. An alternative proposal by Jón Helgason is to take blanị to represent blánni, the dative singular of blá ("pond" or "marsh") with the suffixed article. Jón proposes this with the caveat that this is a rather early inscription for the suffixed article to make an appearance.

== Cipher runes? ==
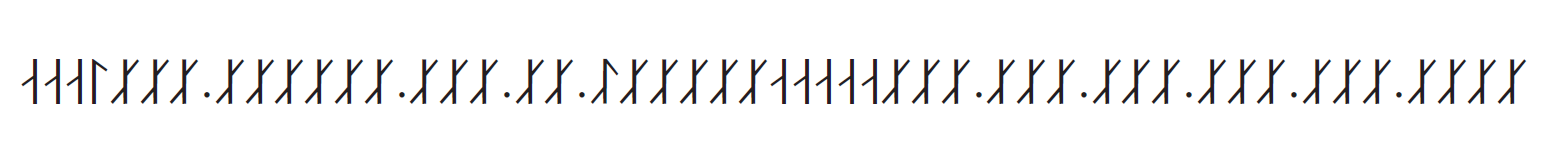
The inscription on side C of the Narsaq stick as presented by Bernard Mees.

Side C of the stick is carefully carved with 49 signs using the same technique as on the A side. The row begins with four apparently normal runes, aaal, but then continues with a repeated symbol with the appearance of a bind-rune formed of k and reversed upside-down k. These symbols are divided into groups with one-point division marks. In the middle of the line there are again some normal runes, aaaaa, followed by more bind-runes of the same type. The meaning of this row of symbols is unknown. Moltke compared the carving to known systems of coded runes based on the principle of dividing the runic alphabet into three groups (ættir) and referring to each rune by the number of the group and its location within the group. He was unable to arrive at an interpretation in this manner. Nevertheless, Moltke argued that the symbols are carved and organized with such care that they must have a meaning. Marie Stoklund similarly comments that "The inscription has not yet been deciphered, though it looks as if it ought to make sense". Jonas Nordby is less certain that the carvings are based on a cipher system, suggesting that they might be some form of tally.

== Purpose and parallels ==
Erik Moltke saw the Narsaq stick as a pagan artifact with religious or magical significance. In his interpretation, the maiden Bifrau is a benevolent mythological being as well as possibly an asterism. She is invoked for protection on the treacherous sea. The core of the magic could be encoded in the cipher runes which might contain the name of the runemaster or a magical word. Helgi Guðmundsson pointed out that a virgin sitting on the sky was reminiscent of Christian ideas but that this did not seem to throw any light on the text. He also suggested a similarity to lines from the Eddic poem Vafþrúðnismál: "Hræsvelgr he is called who sits at the end of the sky". (Note: Old Norse Hræsvelgr heitir, er sitr á himins enda.)

In addition to other inscriptions with word play on sá, scholars have pointed more generally to inscriptions and manuscript texts containing repeated s+vowel elements. Two runic sticks from Bergen (B 524 and B 404) contain s+vowel formulas next to references to attractive women. This has been seen as a parallel to the 'maiden' and repeated sa of the Narsaq stick. Scholars have speculated that some form of love magic was involved. There are also obscure occurrences of s+vowel repetitions in manuscript texts including sisisill bivivill in a manuscript of the Prose Edda and sa sa sa sa sa salutem in domino sa in a manuscript from Bergen.

Jón Helgason suggested that the stick had a pedagogic function with the inscription intended to illustrate the ambiguity of runic writing. He makes a lighthearted suggestion that the carver was Erik the Red himself and the pupil his son Leif and stages a conversation between the two.

== Works cited ==
- Helgi Guðmundsson (1975). "Rúnaristan frá Narssaq". Gripla. 1: 188–194.
- "I Tigssaluk boede en bonde, der levede som eskimoerne..." Atuagagdliutit. 1955-10-03. p. 8.
- Imer, Lisbeth M. (2014). "The tradition of writing in Norse Greenland – writing in an agrarian community" (PDF). In Gulløv, Hans Christian (ed.). Northern Worlds – landscapes, interactions and dynamics. pp. 339–351. ISBN 9788776748241.
- Imer, Lisbeth M. (2017). Peasants and Prayers: The Inscriptions of Norse Greenland. Odense: University of Southern Denmark Press. ISBN 978-8776023454.
- Jón Helgason (1977). "Á sá sá sá es á sá sat". Gripla. 2: 198–200.
- Knirk, James (1994). "Learning to write with runes in medieval Norway". In Lindell, Inger (ed.). Medeltida skrift- och språkkultur. Nordisk medeltidsliteracy i ett diglossiskt och digrafiskt perspektiv II. Nio föreläsningar från ett symposium i Stockholm våren 1992. Stockholm: Sällskapet Runica et Mediævalia. pp. 169–212. ISBN 9188568024.
- Källström, Magnus (2010). "Lönnrunorna i Långgränd. En runinskrift och en ordlek från medeltidens Sigtuna" (PDF). Situna dei: 77–83. Archived from the original (PDF) on 2020-11-24.
- MacLeod, Mindy; Mees, Bernard (2006). Runic Amulets and Magic Objects. Boydell Press. ISBN 1843832054.
- Moltke, Erik (1961). "En grønlandsk runeindskrift fra Erik den rødes tid. Narssaq-pinden" (PDF). Grønland: 401–410.
- Nordby, K. Jonas (2018). Lønnruner. Kryptografi i runeinnskrifter fra vikingtid og middelalder (PDF). Oslo: Institutt for lingvistiske og nordiske studier. Det humanistiske fakultet. Universitetet i Oslo.
- Ólafur Halldórsson (1979). "Góð er gáta þín". Gripla. 3: 230–233.
- Sanness Johnsen, Ingrid (1968). Stuttruner i vikingtidens innskrifter. Oslo: Universitetsforlaget.
- Steenholt Olesen, Rikke (2012). "Runes about a Snow-White Woman: The Lund Gaming-Piece Revisited" (PDF). Futhark: International Journal of Runic Studies. 3: 89–104.
- Stoklund, Marie (1993). "Objects with runic inscriptions from Ø 17a". Meddelelser om Grønland, Man & Society. 18: 47–52.
- Vebæk, C. L. (1993). "Narsaq – a Norse landnáma farm". Meddelelser om Grønland, Man & Society. 18.
