= 1834 in archaeology =

Below are notable events in archaeology that occurred in 1834.

== Excavations ==
- Excavations made at Meroë by Giuseppe Ferlini
- Recovery of guns and other material from the wreck of HMS Royal George (1756) in the Solent by Charles Anthony Deane and his brother John begins

== Explorations ==
- Juan Galindo explores the Maya ruins of Copan
- French scholar Charles Texier finds the first Hittite site but does not identify it as such

== Miscellaneous ==
- John Clayton begins to safeguard Hadrian's Wall

== Births ==
- April 30 - John Lubbock, English prehistorian (d. 1913)

== See also ==
- List of years in archaeology
- 1833 in archaeology
- 1835 in archaeology
