= 1838 in archaeology =

Below are notable events in archaeology that occurred in 1839.

== Explorations ==
- August 31 - Scottish-born scene painter David Roberts sets sail for Egypt (with the encouragement of J. M. W. Turner) to produce a series of drawings of the region for use as the basis for paintings and chromolithographs, later published in The Holy Land, Syria, Idumea, Arabia, Egypt, and Nubia
- John Shae Perring, a British engineer working under Colonel Howard Vyse, clears the entrances to the pyramids of Sahure, Neferirkare and Nyuserre in Egypt.
- French orientalist painters Antoine-Alphonse Montfort and François Lehoux visit and paint the Roman temple of Bziza.

== Finds ==
- The 5th century BC bronze Chatsworth Head (found on Cyprus in 1836) is acquired by the 6th Duke of Devonshire at Smyrna from H. P. Borrell.
- Etruscan statuettes found in Lake of the Idols.
- Victoria Cave near Settle, North Yorkshire in England, containing Paleolithic remains, is discovered.
- Winter 1837/38 - The Neolithic settlement of Rinyo on Rousay in Orkney (Scotland) is discovered.
- c. January - Remains of a Roman villa are found near Bath, Somerset, England during construction of the Great Western Railway and recorded with artefacts being preserved.

== Publications ==
- Rifa'a el-Tahtawi publishes The History of Ancient Egyptians.
- Jacques Boucher de Crèvecœur de Perthes publishes the first part of De La Création, Essai sur L'Origine et la Progression des Êtres.
- Jean-Frédéric Waldeck publishes the first detailed account of the Maya ruins of Uxmal.

== Deaths ==
- March 12 - Richard Polwhele, Cornish antiquarian (b. 1760).
- May 19 - Sir Richard Colt Hoare, English archaeologist (b. 1758).
