= Monte Falterona =

Mountain in Italy

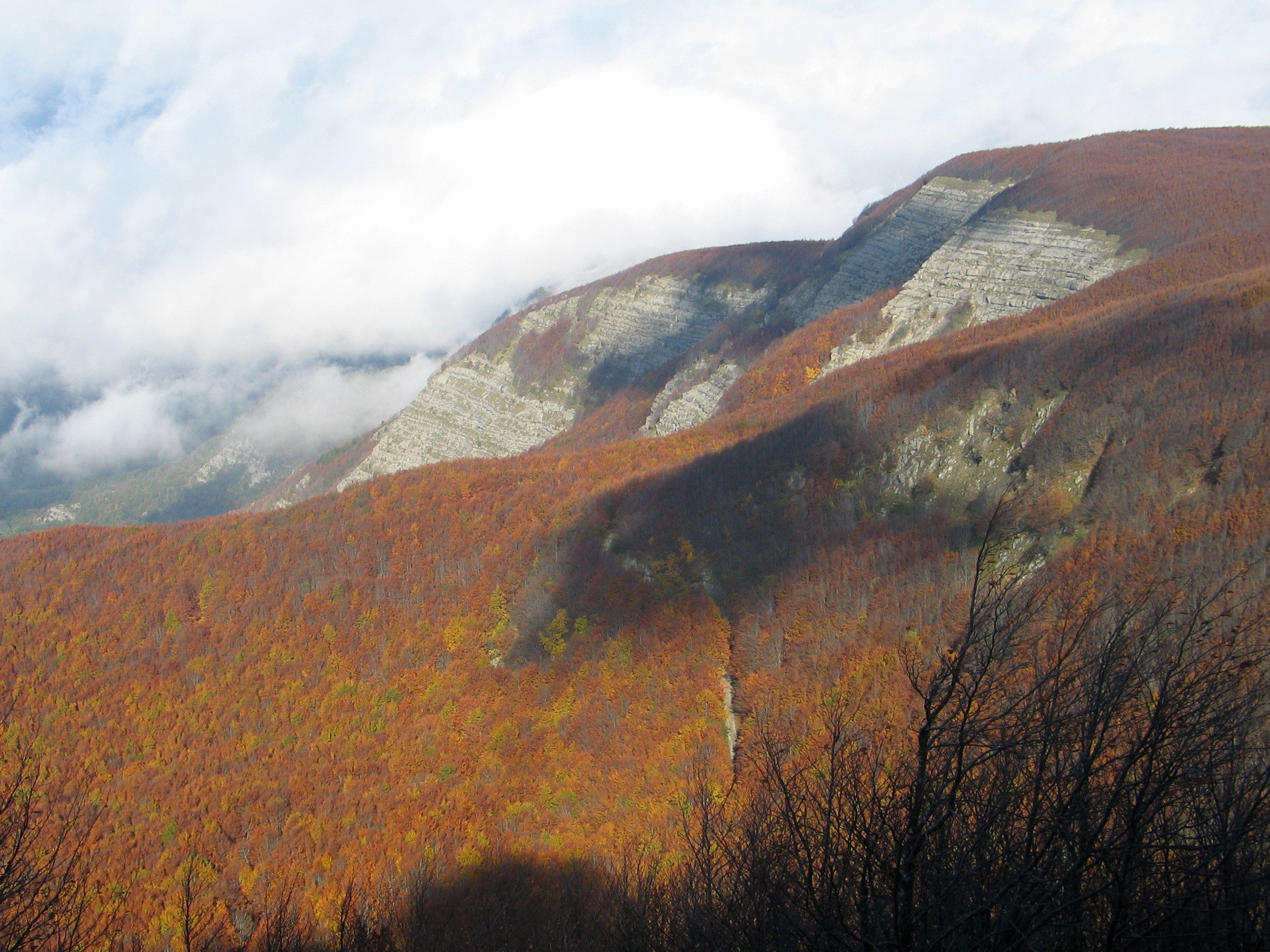

Highest point
- Elevation: 1,654 m (5,427 ft)
- Prominence: 54 m (177 ft)
- Isolation: 1.1 km (0.68 mi)
- Coordinates: 43°52′N 11°42′E

Geography
- Location within Italy
- Location: Tuscany, Italy
- Parent range: Tuscan-Emilian Apennines, a branch of the Northern Apennines.

Monte Falterona is a mountain in the Tuscan-Romagnolo Apennines, in the Casentino traditional region, standing at 1,654 m. It is part of the Casentino forests, Monte Falterona and Campigna National Park. The peak is crossed by the borders of the provinces of Florence, Arezzo and Forlì-Cesena. The mountain, mostly composed of sandstone, is covered by beeches and, from one of its sides, the Arno River springs (Italian: Capo d'Arno).

On the east is a grassy depression with the relic of an ancient lake known as the Lago degli Idoli. The lake has been important from an archaeological perspective as numerous Etruscan statuettes have been found, now distributed across a number of Western museums, including the Louvre, Hermitage and British Museum.
