= 1828 in philosophy =

== Births ==
- January 28 - Roberto Ardigò (died 1920)
- May 26 - Boris Chicherin (died 1904)
- July 12 - Nikolay Chernyshevsky (died 1889)
- September 28 - Friedrich Albert Lange (died 1875)
- October 16 - Nikolay Strakhov (died 1896)
- October 28 - Joseph Dietzgen (died 1888)
