= 1837 in archaeology =

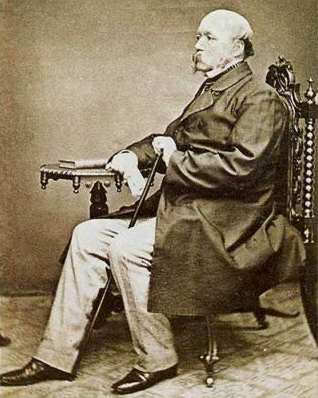
John Gardner Wilkinson, Egyptologist.

Below are notable events in archaeology that occurred in 1837.

== Events ==
- Antikensammlung Berlin acquires the 5th century BC red-figure pottery Berlin Foundry Cup from Volci.

== Explorations ==
- Richard William Howard Vyse investigates the interiors of the Pyramids of Giza using blasting techniques.

== Excavations ==
- Rillaton Barrow in Cornwall, England, excavated and Rillaton Gold Cup found.

== Finds ==
- Pietroasele Treasure found in Romania.

== Publications ==
- John Gardner Wilkinson - Manners and Customs of the Ancient Egyptians.

== Births ==
- Theodore M. Davis, American Egyptological excavation sponsor (d. 1915).
