= Jean Baptiste Holzmayer =

Baltic German archaeologist and folklorist

Jean Baptiste Holzmayer

Jean Baptiste Holzmayer or Johann Baptist Holzmayer (24 July [O.S. 12] 1839 – 28 October [O.S. 16] 1890) was a Baltic German teacher, archaeologist and folklorist who worked on Saaremaa. He carried out excavations on locations of the ancient forts and stone graves, and gathered material about local religious customs and folklore. Holzmayer was also one of the founders of the local research society, and led the volunteer firefighter society.

== Early life ==
As son of the craftsman Joseph Holzmayer, Johann Baptist Joseph was born on 12 July 1839 in Mayence. From 1858 to 1862 he studied classical philology and ancient studies in Giessen University.

== Life on Saaremaa ==
In 1864, Holzmayer started working in the Kuressaare Gymnasium as teacher of old languages and German literature. In 1865 he was one of the founding members of the Research Society of Saaremaa (Verein zur Kunde Ösels) in Kuressaare. At society a museum was also soon founded. Holzmayer carried out limited excavations at the locations of ancient forts of Kaarma, Muhu, and Pöide. He also composed the descriptions of all the historical hill forts on Saaremaa. During period of 1868–1874 Holzmayer excavated the stone graves of Piila, Kantsi, Päälda, Paju, Loona, Mäla, Kurevere and Viira. Finds from the excavations formed basis of Research Society museum's collections. By the time of Holzmayer's death, the museum's collection included 1163 archeological objects, and 1877 coins, mostly from the ancient hoards. He also encouraged Estonians like Mihkel Kallas, Rudolf Kallas and Carl Wilhelm Freundlich to participate in collecting.

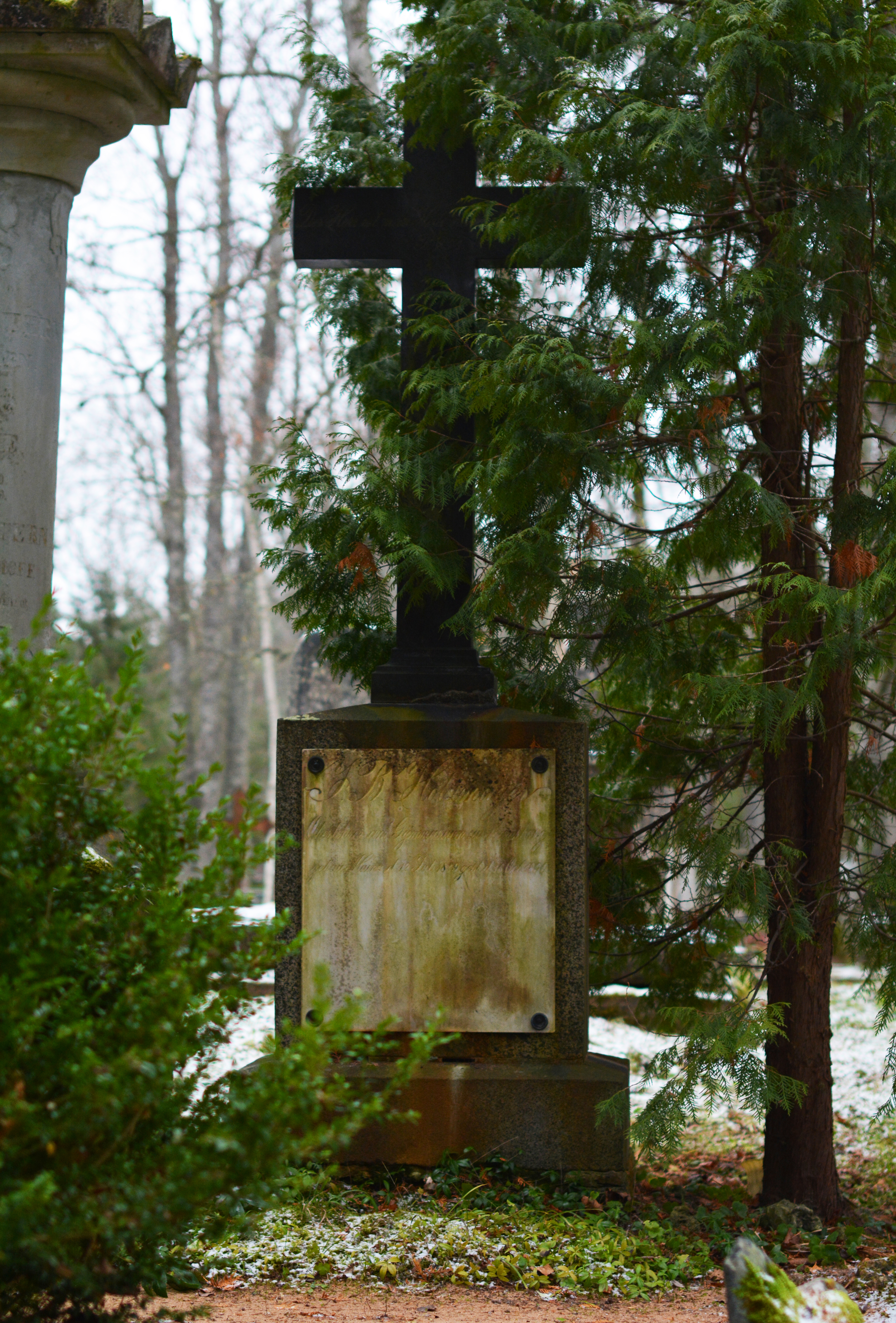
Grave of Jean Baptiste Holzmayer

In addition to his archeological activities, Holzmayer was active in gathering material about the ancient religious customs and folklore. Starting from 1867 he collected data with written questionnaires, with a goal of eventually publishing his finds. In this he was strong example for the Estonian folklorist and linguist Jakob Hurt. Hurt also later helped to publish Holzmayer's Osiliana, which summarized findings of the Holzmayer's research. The first part included materials about ancient religion, the second part was about people's customs, and the third part included results of studies of the burial places.

Holzmayer became the leader of the Kuressaare Volunteer Firefighter Society. Due to his strict leadership, most of the Baltic-Germans left the society, leaving only common people as members.

Holzmayer died on 28 October 1890 in Kuressaare, and was buried in Kudjape Cemetery.

== Bibliography ==
- Kaevats, Ülo; et al. (2000). Eesti entsüklopeedia 14 (in Estonian). Eesti Entsüklopeediakirjastus. ISBN 9985700643.
- Lang, Valter; Laneman, Margot; et al. (2006). Archaeological Research in Estonia 1865 – 2005. Tartu University Press. ISBN 9949112338.
