= Lake of the Idols =

Lake in Italy

- Lago degli Idoli (Italian)
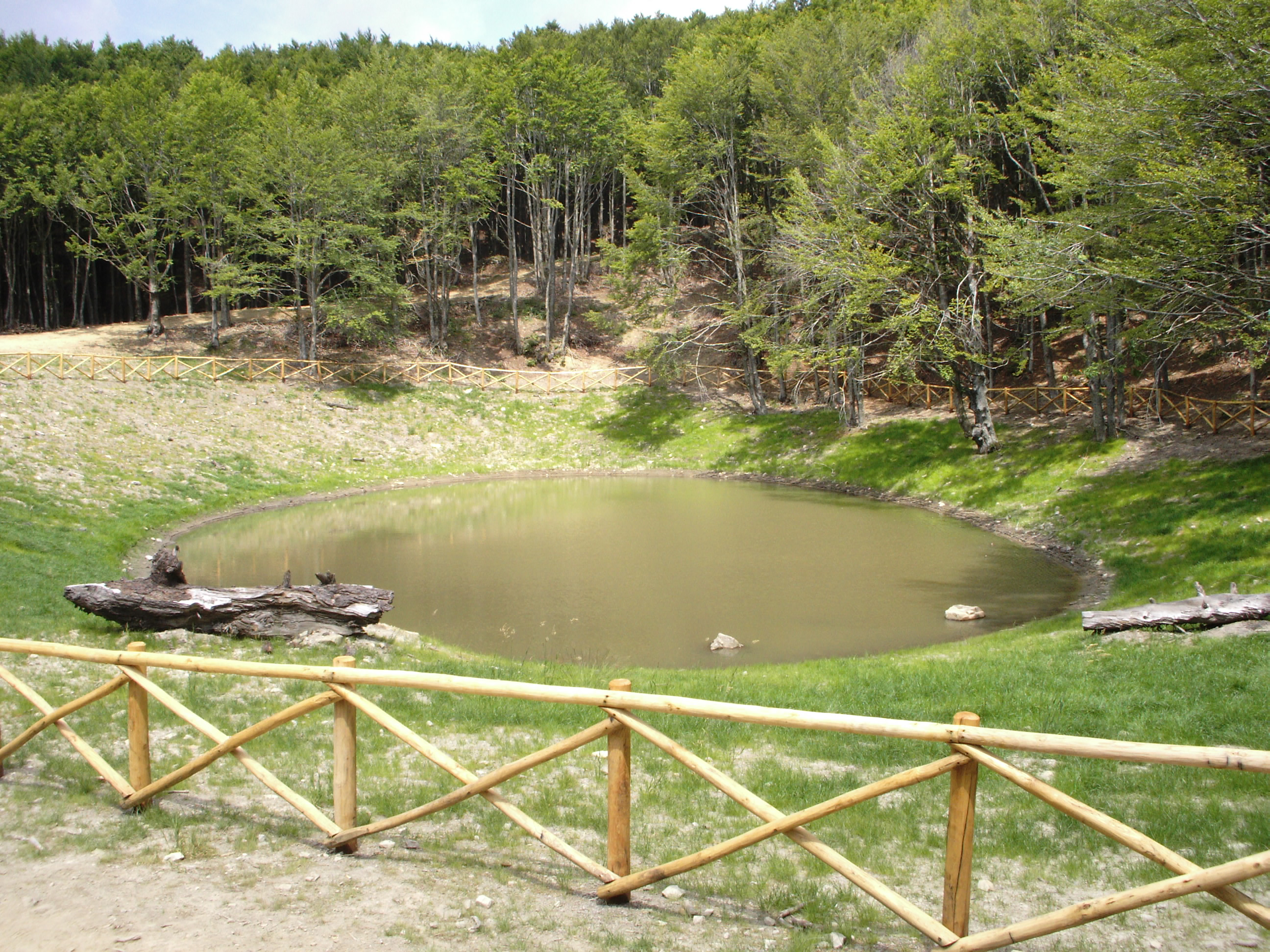
- Lake of the Idols following restoration

- Location in Italy
- Location: Arezzo, Tuscany, Italy
- Coordinates: 43°51′50″N 11°41′30″E
- Basin countries: Italy
- Surface elevation: 1,380 m (4,530 ft)

Lake of the Idols (Italian: Lago degli Idoli) is a lake located in Arezzo Province, Tuscany, Italy. It is located 1,380 metres (4,530 ft) above sea level atop Monte Falterona, about 600 metres from the source of the river Arno. Situated near an ancient road linking Etruria (including Tuscany and Umbria) with the Adriatic port cities of Romagna, it is known for one of the largest archaeological finds of the Etruscan civilization; over 600 bronze statuettes of Etruscan and Roman origin, along with thousands of other figurines from Cisalpine Gaul and Umbria, were discovered within the lake.

== Name ==
The lake was originally known as Lago della Ciliegeta (eng. Cherry Grove Lake), named for the cherry groves that grew around the lake. The name Lago degli Idoli (eng. Lake of the Idols) was applied after 1838 and refers to the Etruscan bronze statuettes found in the lake (see History). Another name for the lake is Buca del Tesoro (eng. Treasure Hole).

== History ==
According to Alfredo Bresciani, the lake formed approximately 6,000 years ago (4th millennia BCE), based on radiocarbon dating and dendrochronology testing done on the lake.

The lake was used in ancient times by the Etruscans. They viewed it as a "holy spring of the river-gods" because of the healing qualities of the water, which contains a high concentration of tannin. The Etruscans would throw bronze statuettes into the lake as a form of votive offering. These statuettes depicted typically people or animals. Some artifacts in the lake depicted body parts, such as heads, arms and legs, suggesting the healing power of the lake. Other artifacts found at the lake were coins (including Etruscan aes rude), and fragments of arrow bits and pottery. It is believed that the lake was popular among soldiers based on the number of arrow fragments, and more importantly, the number of statuettes found depicting Hercle, the Etruscan version of Greek divine hero, Heracles. Artifacts found at the lake are dated between mid-6th to late-4th centuries BCE.

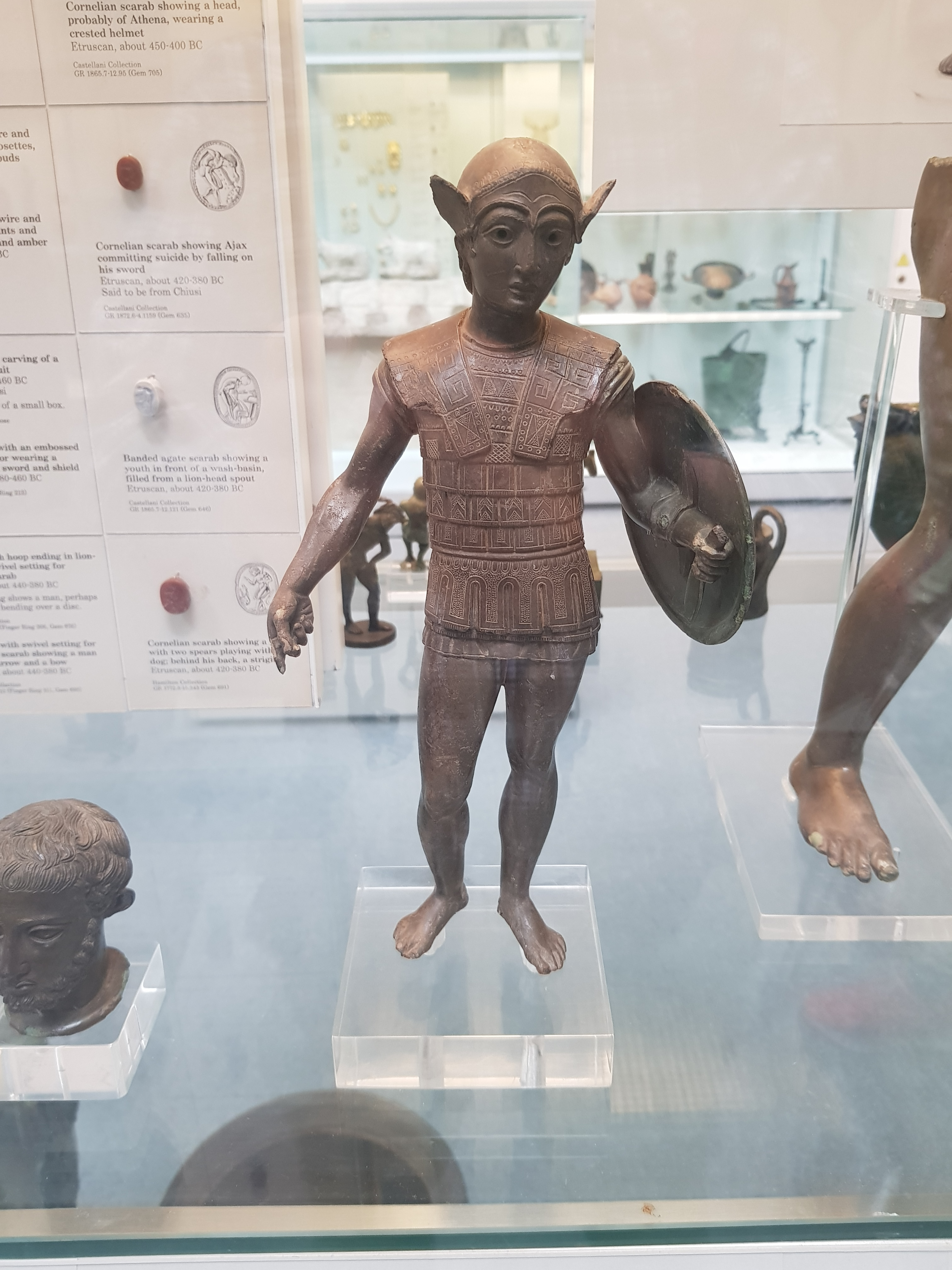
Votive figure from Monte Falterona in the British Museum (420-400 BC)

One of these statuettes was discovered by a local shepherdess in May 1838. The statuette was probably of Hercle, now kept in the British Museum. News of the find spread quickly, and a team of local amateur archaeologists from nearby Stia began excavating the site in June 1838. The lake was subsequently dried following several days of fruitful excavations. Over 600 statuettes and thousands of other artifacts were discovered between 1838–1839. Many of these artifacts at the time were presented to the Archaeological Institute of Rome in 1842, but without any buyers. Ultimately they were sold to a private collector, who resold them to a number of museums, notably among them the British Museum, the Hermitage Museum and the Louvre. Over time, treasure seekers looted the lake, stripping it of whatever artifacts remained within.

Official excavations were sparse following the 1838–1839 excavations. The next excavation, in 1972, led to the discovery of three artifacts within the lake. Previously, in 1971, five artifacts in the form of bronze statuettes were accidentally recovered from the site.

The last significant excavation of the lake was done in 2003. Eight trenches were dug into the lake center. Within the trenches, among the artifacts found were bronze statuettes, fragments of bronze weaponry, "two pieces of gold foil shaped into bull-headed protomes" and "two polychrome beads". "In addition to the objects named above, other finds include nails, spear points, ceramics (including an intact bucchero grigio miniature cup), arrows and aes rude." These artifacts were mostly dated between the 6th–5th centuries BCE.

Following the 2003 excavations, local authorities began rehabilitating the lake. In 2007, the lake was refilled using water from a nearby spring. Vegetation surrounding the lake was replanted to mimic its original form during the Etruscan period, using pollen samples recovered from the surrounding layers of earth.

== Hydrology ==
The lake is widely perceived to be a pond, due to lack of inflow from any bodies of water, i.e. rivers and streams. Research done at the University of Florence – Faculty of Engineering suggests that there exists an underground spring that provides a continuous stream of water to the lake. It appears that the lake is sinkhole-like, sitting atop layers of sandstone.

== Cultural impact ==
The lake and its history was heavily incorporated into the plot of the 2013 film Neverlake.
