= 1832 in archaeology =

== Explorations ==
- May - Jean-Frédéric Waldeck begins a year's stay at the Maya ruins of Palenque.

== Finds ==
- 15 October - The Hexham Hoard of eight thousand copper-alloy coins (stycas) in a bronze bucket is discovered while a grave is being dug close to Hexham Abbey in the north of England.
- Hermes of Andros in Andros, Greece.

== Publications ==
- Ippolito Rosellini, Monumenti dell'Egitto e della Nubia begins publication.

== Births ==
- 29 July - Luigi Palma di Cesnola, Italian American soldier, diplomat, archaeologist and museum director (d. 1904)
- 1 November - Marianne Brocklehurst, English Egyptological traveller and expedition sponsor (d. 1898)

== Deaths ==
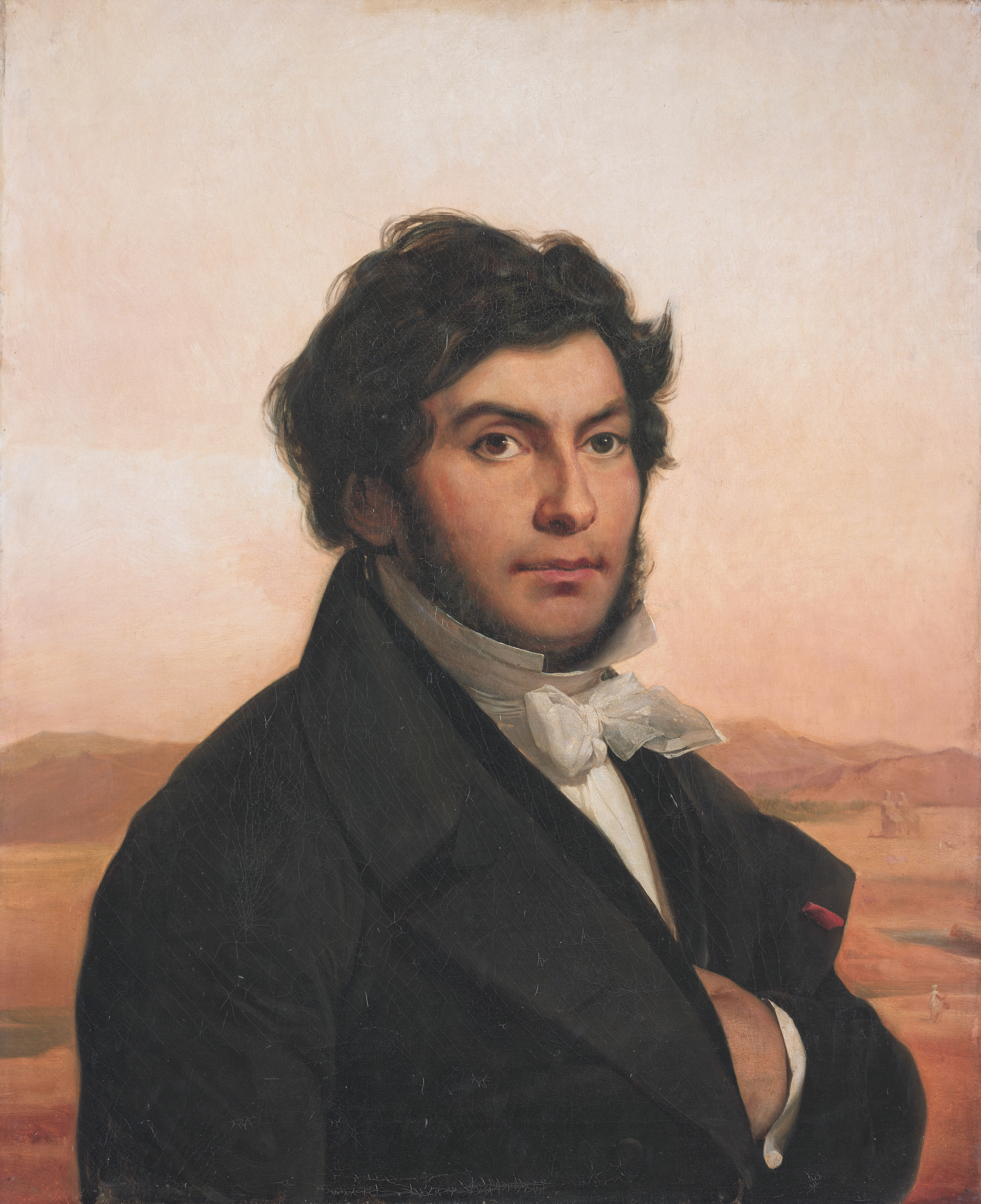
Jean-François Champollion

- 4 March - Jean-François Champollion, French decipherer of Egyptian hieroglyphs (b. 1790)
- 13 May - Georges Cuvier, French naturalist, zoologist and paleontologist (b. 1769)

== See also ==
- List of years in archaeology
- 1831 in archaeology
- 1833 in archaeology
