= Roberto Ardigò =

Italian philosopher (1828-1920)

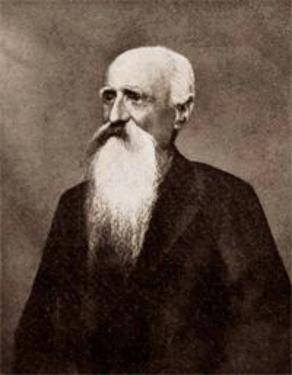
Roberto Ardigò

Roberto Felice Ardigò (28 January 1828 – 7 February 1918) was an Italian philosopher. He was an influential leader of Italian positivism and a former Roman Catholic priest.

== Biography ==
Ardigò was born in Casteldidone, in what is now the province of Cremona, in Lombardy, and trained for the priesthood. He resigned from the Church in 1871 after abandoning theology and faith in 1869. He was appointed as a professor of theology at the University of Padua in 1881, at a time when a reaction to idealism had taken place in philosophical circles.

Inspired by Auguste Comte, Ardigò differed from Comte in that he considered thought more important than matter and insisted on psychological disquisition. He believed thought was dominant in every action and the result of every action, and that it disappears only in a state of general corruption.

He died by suicide at Padua in 1918, at the age of 90.

== Works ==
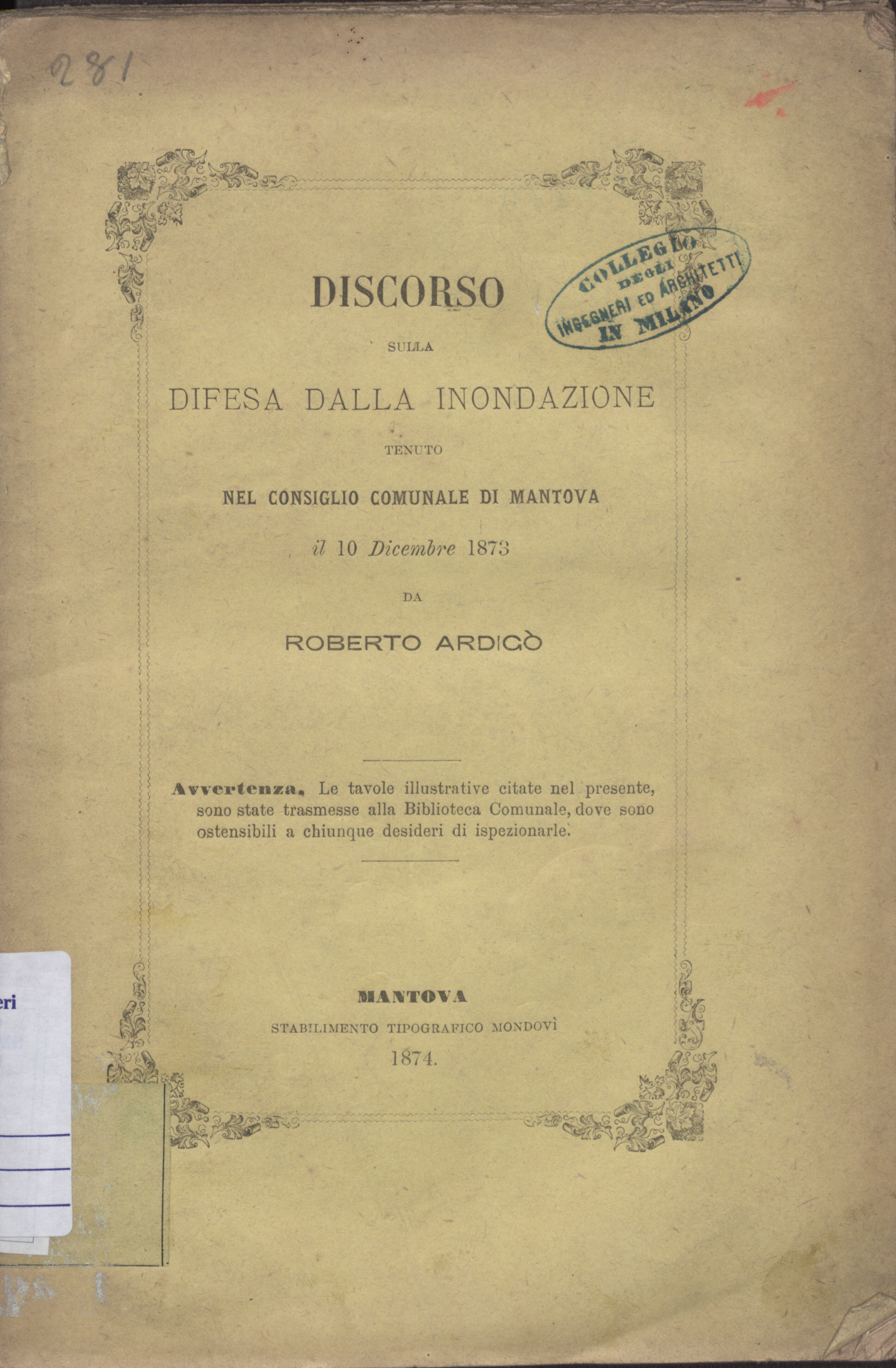
Discorso sulla difesa dalla inondazione (1874)

- La psicologia come scienza positiva [Psychology as a Positive Science]. Mantua: Viviano Guastalla. 1870.
- La morale dei positivisti [The Moral of the Positivists]. Milan: Natale Battezzati. 1879.
- Discorso sulla difesa dalla inondazione. Mantova: Stabilimento tipografico Mondovì. 1874.
