= Kingittorsuaq Runestone =

Runestone in Greenland

Coordinates: 55.6750°N 12.5751°E

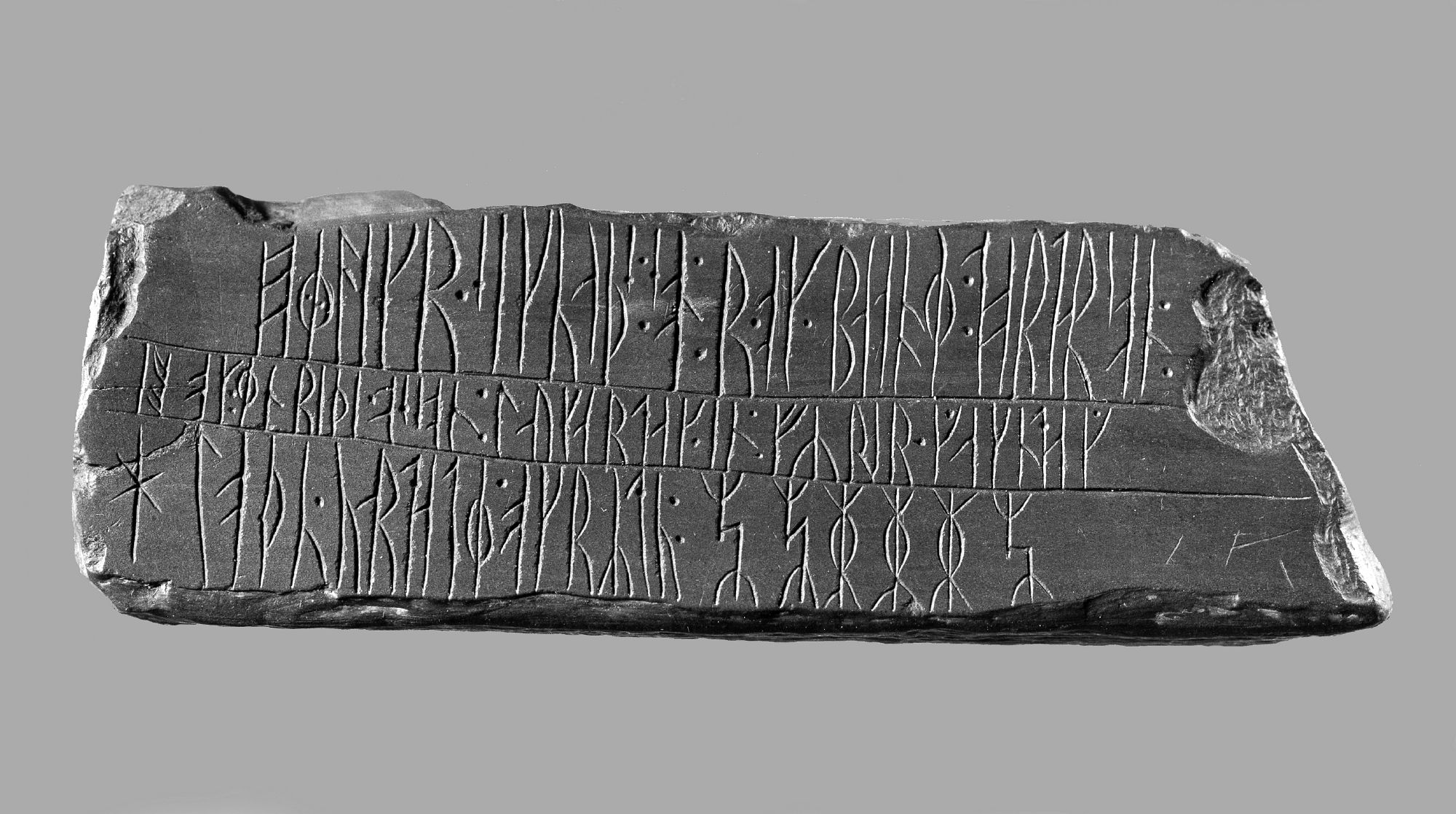
- Writing: Medieval runes
- Created: Middle Ages, c. 1300
- Discovered: 1824; Greenland
- Culture: Norse
- Rundata ID: GR 1 M
- Runemaster: Unknown

The Kingittorsuaq Runestone (old spelling: Kingigtorssuaq), listed as GR 1 in the Rundata catalog, is a runestone that was found on Kingittorsuaq Island, an island in the Upernavik Archipelago in northwestern Greenland.

== Description ==
The Kingittorsuaq Runestone was found in 1824 in a group of three cairns that formed an equilateral triangle on top of the mountain on Kingittorsuaq Island in the south-central part of the Upernavik Archipelago. The stone is now located at the National Museum of Denmark in Copenhagen.

The stone has been dated to the Middle Ages. The Catholic Encyclopedia states the date as April 25, 1135. Others have dated the stone between 1250 and 1333. However, as the historian Finn Gad has pointed out, the date given on the stone can be interpreted in various ways. As such, it cannot, as previously thought, be taken as evidence for the three hunters named on the stone having over-wintered in this region.

== Inscription ==
⁓ el^likr · sikuaþs : so^n:r · ok · baan^ne : torta^r son : ¶ ⁓ ok : enriþi · os son : laukardak·in : fyrir · gakndag ¶ hloþu · ua^rda te · ok rydu : ??????
{} Erlingr {} Sighvats {} sonr {} ok {} Bjarni {} Þórðar sonr {} {} {} ok {} Eindriði {} Odds sonr {} laugardagin {} fyrir {} gagndag {} hlóðu {} varða þe[ssa] {} ok … {} …
Erlingr Sighvatrs son and Bjarni Þorðr's son and Eindriði Oddr's son, constructed these cairns the Saturday before Rogation Day, and …

The first line is the transcription verbatim; the second line is the normalized Old Norse version. A ^ mark indicates a bind rune; for example a^r indicates that ᛆᚱ is written as a single glyph. A ~ indicates an unspecified punctuation mark.

=== Undeciphered runes ===
The six runes following the translated text are undeciphered, though they do have very close single-character components. While some readings presume the symbols are meaningless, other interpretations hold that a secret message or magic words are encoded in the runes.

The earliest interpretation of the inscription by linguist Rasmus Rask (1824) reads the final characters as encoding the year. Philologist Finnur Jónsson in 1914, however, declared them to be ornamental or mystical signs that could not be interpreted. Runologist Magnus Olsen in 1932 posited that the last deciphered word, ok rydu, was hastily written and is missing punctuation, and should be read as ok rýndu (meaning 'and wrote runes') and that the six remaining runes translate to vel ('well') or vit ('widely').

Linguist Fritz Läffler in 1906 saw similarities with bind runes on the Norum font that combine ᛉᛋᛣ into a single rune. Reading the final deciphered word as ruddu and interpreting the magic word as ís ('ice'), Läffler read the phrase as "they cleared away the ice." Philologist William Thalbitzer in 1951 drew upon Olsen and Läffler's interpretations to propose that the end of the inscription should read ok rýndu ís implying that runes were written to help break the ice. He suggests it would have been taboo for ís to be written in standard runes if the goal was to magic away the ice.. In her 2002 studies of bind runes, however, Mindy MacLeod finds little to no evidence to support the use of bind runes in manipulating values in runic numerology.

In 1967, Cryptographer Alf Mongé proposed that two sets of ciphers are employed with the symbols, providing both a date and the name of the carver.

== See also ==
- 1824 in archaeology
- Greenlandic Norse
- List of runestones
- Cipher runes
