= 1806 in archaeology =

The year 1806 in archaeology involved some significant events.

== Publications ==
- Saggio delle lingue Italia by Luigi Lanzi
- Dei vasi antichi dipinti volgarmente chiamati Etruschi by Luigi Lanzi

== Deaths ==
- September 18 – Hayman Rooke, British army officer and antiquarian (born 1723)
