= 1812 in archaeology =

The year 1812 in archaeology involved some significant events.

== Explorations ==
- Swiss explorer Johann Ludwig Burckhardt discovers Petra.

== Excavations ==
- Colosseum, Rome: The arena substructure is partly excavated during 1810–1814.

== Publications ==
- Sir Richard Colt Hoare - The Ancient History of South Wiltshire.

== Miscellaneous ==
- American Antiquarian Society is founded in Massachusetts by Isaiah Thomas.

== Deaths ==
- July 14 - Christian Gottlob Heyne, German classicist (b. 1729)
- December 22 - Pierre Henri Larcher, French classicist (b. 1726)

== See also ==
- Roman Forum - excavations.
