= 1829 in archaeology =

1829 in archaeology

== Explorations ==
- 'Charles Masson' (James Lewis) explores the Indus Valley Civilisation and locates the site of Harappa.

== Excavations ==
- First excavations at Olympia, Greece by an expedition led by Abel Blouet
- Yorkshire Philosophical Society concludes excavation of St Mary's Abbey, York, England, prior to construction of the Yorkshire Museum on part of the site.

== Finds ==
- Engis 2, part of the skull of a young child and other bones, recognised in 1936 as the first known Neanderthal fossil, is found in the Awirs cave near Engis in the United Kingdom of the Netherlands (modern-day Belgium) by Philippe-Charles Schmerling.

== Deaths ==
- 10 May - Thomas Young, English Egyptologist (b. 1773)

== See also ==
- List of years in archaeology
- 1828 in archaeology
- 1830 in archaeology
