= 1790s in archaeology =

The decade of the 1790s in archaeology involved some significant events.

== Explorations ==
- 1799: Napoleon in Egypt: French troops occupy Egyptian territory. Tomb KV20 in the Valley of the Kings is located.

== Excavations ==
- 1794–96: Roman tessellated pavements found at Frampton, Dorset, depicting one of the earliest known Christian symbols in England.
- 1796: The Roman fort, vicus, bridge abutments and associated remains of Hadrian's Wall are excavated at Chesters, in England.
- 1798: The first recorded excavations at Stonehenge are made by William Cunnington and Richard Colt Hoare.
- Formal excavations continue at Pompeii.

== Finds ==
- 1790
  - Pediment of the Roman temple at Bath, England, is discovered during work near the Roman Baths.
  - Townley Discobolus and Lansdowne Heracles are discovered at Hadrian's Villa in Tivoli, Italy.
  - Bones presumed to be those of English poet John Milton (d. 1674) are disinterred during repairs to the church of St Giles-without-Cripplegate in London.
  - December 17 - The late post-classic Mexica Aztec sun stone is discovered during repairs to Mexico City Metropolitan Cathedral.
- 1796: Summer - Ribchester Hoard and helmet found in Lancashire, England.
- 1797: July 17 - The tomb of John, King of England (d. 1216), is rediscovered at Worcester Cathedral in front of the altar.
- 1799: July 15 - At the town of Rosetta (Rashid), a harbor on the Mediterranean coast of Egypt, French troops find the Rosetta Stone, inscribed with parallel texts in Greek, Egyptian demotic and hieroglyphs (translated in 1822 by Jean-François Champollion).

== Publications ==
- 1793: James Douglas - Nenia Britannica, or, A Sepulchral History of Great Britain, from the earliest period to its general conversion to Christianity (published complete), the first account of the excavation of an Anglo-Saxon site (in Kent) with artefacts systematically described and illustrated.
- 1797: James Hutton, a Scotsman who has been called "the Father of Geology," publishes theories describing the earth as destroying and renewing itself in a never-ending cycle.
- 1799: Vice President of the United States Thomas Jefferson, writing in Transactions of the American Philosophical Society 4, describes the bones of Megalonyx jeffersonii, an extinct ground sloth.

== Other events ==
- 1797: January 3 - Three of the stones making up Stonehenge fall due to heavy frosts.
- 1798: December 10 - Some antiquities being shipped to England by Sir William Hamilton are lost in the wreck of HMS Colossus.

== Births ==
- 1790: December 22 - Jean-François Champollion, French decipherer of Egyptian hieroglyphs (d. 1832)
- 1792: June 10 - John Clayton, English antiquarian (d. 1890)
- 1793: January 22 - Caspar Reuvens, founder of Rijksmuseum van Oudheden (Netherlands National Museum of Antiquities), first professor of archaeology (d. 1835)
- 1794: July 7 - Frances Stackhouse Acton, née Knight, English botanist, archaeologist, artist and writer (d. 1881)
- 1796: November 27 - John MacEnery, Irish-born priest and pioneer archaeologist (d. 1841)
- 1797: October 5 - John Gardiner Wilkinson, English traveller, writer and pioneer Egyptologist (d. 1875)
- 1798: Approximate date - Kyriakos Pittakis, Greek archaeologist (d. 1863)
- 1799: December 12 (23) - Karl Bryullov, Russian painter of The Last Day of Pompeii (d. 1852)

== Deaths ==
- 1795: April 30 - Jean-Jacques Barthélemy French writer and numismatist (b. 1716)

| Preceded by 1780s in archaeology | Archaeology timeline 1790s | Succeeded by 1800 in archaeology |
