= 1836 in archaeology =

Below are notable events in archaeology that occurred in 1836.

== Explorations ==
- October 16 - Ruins of Roman site at Mastaura in Greece visited by William Hamilton.
- Site of Susa in Persia examined by Henry Rawlinson.
- Site of Tripontium in England located by Matthew Bloxam.

== Finds ==
- May - Right half of Llandaf Diptych (carved from elephant ivory in Paris around 1340/60) found in south Wales.
- June
  - 17 miniature coffins of unknown provenance are found in a cave on Arthur's Seat in Edinburgh.
  - Wreck of Tudor navy ship Mary Rose (capsized 1545) discovered in the Solent.
- Chatsworth Head found near Tamassos on Cyprus.
- Procne and Itys statue in the Acropolis of Athens, Greece.

== Publications ==
- Otto Jahn - Palamedes.
- Christian Jürgensen Thomsen - Ledetraad til Nordisk Oldkyndighed.

== Events ==
- October 25 - Luxor Obelisk re-erected in Place de la Concorde, Paris.
- James Prinsep begins to decipher the Edicts of Ashoka.
