= Jean-Baptiste Greppo =

French canon

Jean-Baptiste Greppo (17 May 1712, in Lyon – 13 June 1767, in Saint-Paul) was a French canon known for his archaeological studies associated with the ancient walls (fortifications) of Lyon.

== Biography ==
He received his education at Collège de la Trinité in Lyon, and later taught classes in humanities at several colleges, including at Mâcon and Besançon. Afterwards, he returned to Lyon, joining the prefecture at Trinity College. Due to ill health, he had to resign this post, and in 1745, became a priest at St. Paul's Church in Lyon.

From 1749 to 1767 he was a member of the Académie des sciences, belles-lettres et arts de Lyon.

== Literary works ==
- Observations sur la méthode de M. Duhamel pour la conservation des grains, 1753 — Observations on the method of Henri-Louis Duhamel du Monceau for the conservation of grains.
- De la Théorie de la terre relativement aux effets du déluge, 1760 — On the terrestrial theory regarding the effects of the flood.
- De la construction des murs et fortifications de Lyon (imprimé dans les Archives du Rhône). — On the construction of walls and fortifications of Lyon.
