= 1813 in archaeology =

The year 1813 in archaeology involved some significant events.

== Excavations ==
- Colosseum, Rome: The arena substructure is partly excavated during 1810–1814.
- Bremetennacum (Ribchester), Lancashire, England.

== Finds ==
- J. L. Burckhardt finds the main Abu Simbel temple.
- The "Branwen ferch Llŷr" sepulchral urn is discovered on the banks of the river Alaw in Anglesey (Wales), it is later placed in the British Museum by Richard Llwyd.

== Miscellaneous ==
- Society of Antiquaries of Newcastle upon Tyne established in England.

== Births ==
- October 23 - Félix Ravaisson-Mollien, French philosopher and archaeologist (d. 1900).

== See also ==
- Roman Forum - excavations.
