= 1830 in archaeology =

1830 in archaeology

== Publications ==
- First volume of Lord Kingsborough's 9 volume Antiquities of Mexico

== Finds ==
- Discovery of Pagans Hill Roman temple in south-west England
- Possible date – Discovery of Hunterston Brooch in Scotland

== Institutions ==
- February 2 – Yorkshire Museum opened by Yorkshire Philosophical Society in York, England
- Geographical Society of London, predecessor of the Royal Geographical Society, is formed

== Births ==
- May 14 – Antonio Annetto Caruana, Maltese archaeologist (d. 1905)

== See also ==
- List of years in archaeology
- 1829 in archaeology
- 1831 in archaeology
