= Pierre Henri Larcher =

French classical scholar and archaeologist (1726–1812)

Pierre Henri Larcher (12 October 1726 – 22 December 1812) was a French classical scholar and archaeologist.

== Life ==
Born at Dijon, and originally intended for the law, he abandoned it for the classics. His (anonymous) translation of Chariton's Callirhoe (1763) marked him as an excellent Greek scholar. His attack upon Voltaire's Philosophie de l'historie (published under the name of l'Abbé Bazin) created considerable interest at the time. His archaeological and mythological Memoire sur Venus (1775), which has been ranked with similar works of Heyne and Winckelmann, gained him admission to the Academie des Inscriptions (1778).

After the imperial university was founded, he was appointed professor of Greek literature (1809) with Boissonade as his assistant.

Larcher's best work was his translation of Herodotus (1786, new ed. by L Humbert, 1880) on the preparation of which he had spent fifteen years. The translation itself, though correct, is dull, but the commentary (translated into English, London, 1829, new ed. 1844, by W. D. Cooley) dealing with historical, geographical and chronological questions, and enriched by a wealth of illustration from ancient and modern authors, is not without value.
