= 1809 in archaeology =

The year 1809 CE in archaeology included many events, some of which are listed below.

== Publications ==
- First volume of Description de l'Egypte published
