= 1833 in archaeology =

Below are notable events in archaeology that occurred in 1833.

== Publications ==
- Juan Galindo publishes first mention of Maya site of Yaxchilan

== Finds ==
- Mold cape discovered in Wales
- Ice age decorated harpoon and engraving found in Haute-Savoie
- Ram Khamhaeng Inscription discovered by Prince Mongkut of Thailand

== Births ==
- March 17 - Charles Edwin Wilbour, American Egyptologist and writer (d. 1896)
- July 14 - Alfred Biliotti, Italian Levantine British consular officer and archaeologist (d. 1915)
- July 26 - Alexander Henry Rhind, Scottish Egyptologist (d. 1863)

== See also ==
- List of years in archaeology
- 1832 in archaeology
- 1834 in archaeology
