= 1807 in archaeology =

The year 1807 in archaeology involved some significant events.

== Births ==
- August 20 - Charles Roach Smith, British archaeologist; co-founder of the British Archaeological Association (d. 1890)
