= 1815 in archaeology =

The year 1815 in archaeology involved some significant events.

== Finds ==
- The Philae obelisk is discovered, bearing inscriptions in hieroglyphic and Greek including the royal names of Ptolemy IX and Cleopatra.
- A fragmentary palimpsest of the Ambrosian Library at Milan (from the 4th century) is discovered by Cardinal Angelo Mai, containing correspondence between Roman orator/rhetorician and grammarian Marcus Cornelius Fronto and his imperial pupil.
- The Candi Sukuh temple is first discovered, in very poor condition, by Johnson, the resident of Surakarta during the period of government under Sir Stamford Raffles.
- Roman bath-house at Vinovia is discovered.

== Births ==
- Edward Simpson, English archaeological forger (died ca. 1880)
