= 1805 in archaeology =

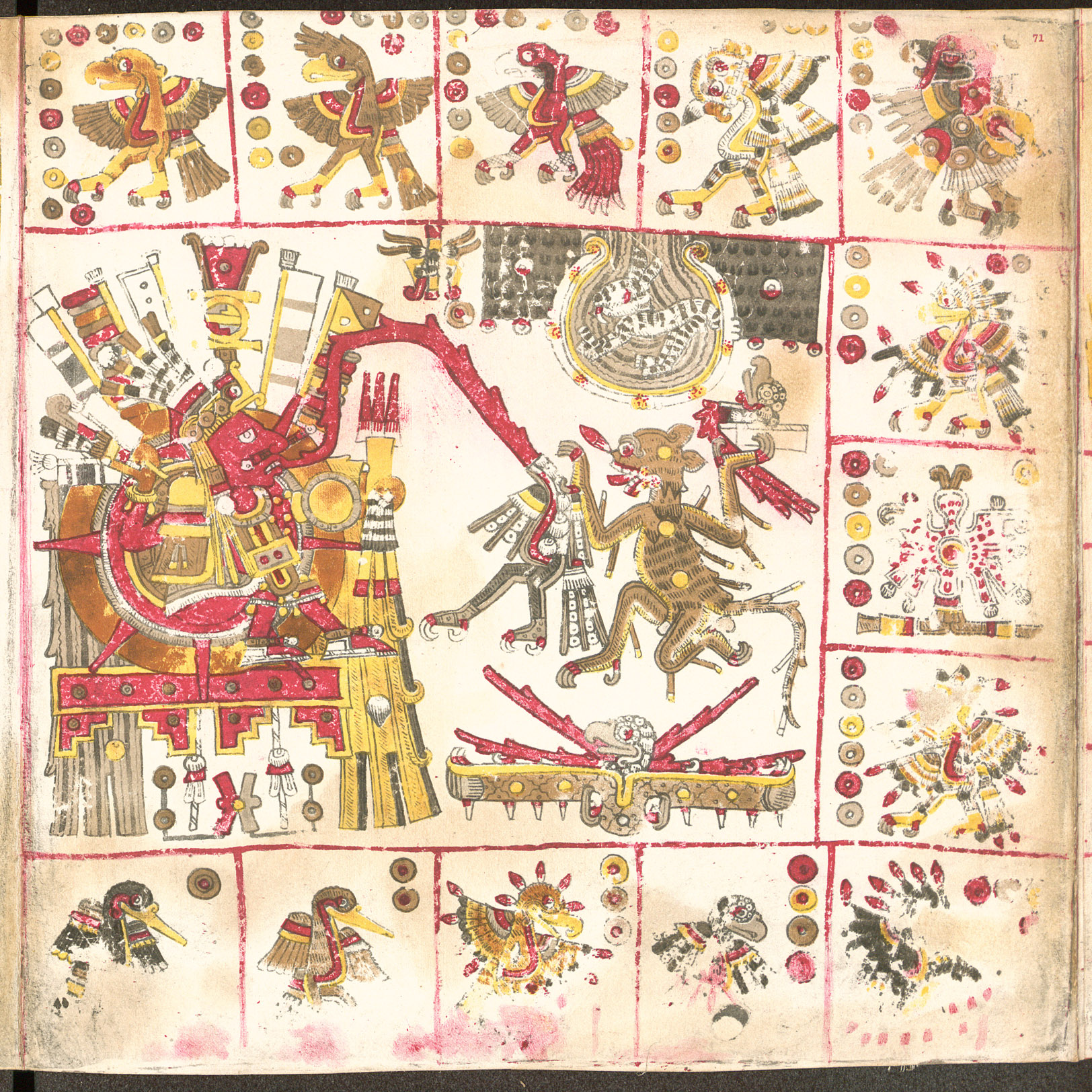

The year 1805 in archaeology involved some significant events.

== Explorations ==
- The Snake River is discovered by the Lewis and Clark Expedition.

== Excavations ==
- Clearance and survey of the 8th century Prambanan Hindu temple compound on Java.

== Finds ==
- A Roman mosaic is discovered under the southwest angle of the Bank of England, at a depth of 12 feet (3 m).
- The Codex Borgia is discovered by Alexander von Humboldt among the effects of Cardinal Stefano Borgia.

== Other events ==
- The British Museum purchases Charles Townley's collection of Roman sculpture.

== Births ==
- June 30 - Rudolf Wagner, German anatomist, physiologist, anthropologist and archaeologist (d. 1864).
- November 28 - John Lloyd Stephens, American explorer of Maya civilization sites in Central America (d. 1852)
