= 1821 in archaeology =

The year 1821 in archaeology involved some significant events.

== Explorations ==
- October - John Gardner Wilkinson begins a twelve-year stay in Egypt, surveying historical sites.

== Finds ==
- 'Gallagh Man', an Iron Age bog body, is found in County Galway, Ireland.

== Miscellaneous ==
- "Egyptian Hall" in London displays artifacts from Ancient Egypt brought to the United Kingdom by Giovanni Battista Belzoni. The Philae obelisk is landed in England in December.
- While not specifically the year 1821, this time period is when one of the most significant categorical discoveries of archaeology was named. Christian Thomsen, a Danish archaeologist, developed the three age system to date objects in museums. These three ages were the "Stone Age," "Bronze Age," and "Iron Age."
- While not specifically the year 1821, this time period is when one of the most significant findings regarding time and dating archaeological findings was discovered. Boucher de Perthes established a much deeper sense of time than what James Usher had previously established. Perthes determined that the world was significantly older than 4004 BC and thus gave archaeology a deeper, more realistic time frame to work with.

== Births ==
- June 21, 1821- The birth of Ephraim George Squier, co-author of "Ancient Monuments of the Mississippi Valley" along with Edwin Hamilton Davis.

== See also ==
- Ancient Egypt / Egyptology
