= 1819 in archaeology =

The year 1819 in archaeology involved some significant events.

== Excavations ==
- The remains of the villa of Pliny, named Villa di Pino, are excavated during 1802–1819 (following the excavations of 1713).
- In Italy, detailed excavations continue at Pompeii.
- The Bignor Roman Villa is excavated between 1811 and 1819.

== Finds ==
- April - In India, the Ajanta Caves are rediscovered by a British hunting party.
- Roman villa found at Stancombe Park near North Nibley, England.

== Other events ==
- In Italy, sexual, nude artifacts from Pompeii are hidden from public view in Naples' Secret Museum.
- In Italy, John Gardner Wilkinson meets the antiquarian Sir William Gell and resolves to study Egyptology.
- King Francis I of Naples visits the Pompeii exhibition at the National Museum with his wife and daughter.
- June 16 – The 7.7–8.2 M_{w} Rann of Kutch earthquake shakes western India with a maximum Mercalli intensity of XI (Extreme), leaving more than 1,500 dead.

== Births ==
- March 28 – Roger Fenton, photographer (d. 1869)

== Deaths ==
- June 29 – Samuel Lysons, English antiquarian (b. 1763)
