= 1804 in archaeology =

The year 1804 in archaeology involved some significant events.

== Excavations ==
- In southern France, the Ratapignata Pyramid (Aven de Ratapignata) is discovered on the hillside north of Nice, France and northwest of Falicon. It was determined to have been a Roman building 9-m (28-ft) tall. The stone pyramid is built atop the opening of the Grotto (Aven) of Ratapignata, on the eastern flank of the ridge. The grotto beneath the pyramid is a karstic cave, called Bauma des Ratapignata in Occitan, or "Cave of the Bats".

== Deaths ==
- August 4 - Karl Friedrich Hermann (d. 1855).
