= 1818 in archaeology =

The year 1818 in archaeology involved some significant events.

== Events ==
- June 13 - Caspar Reuvens is appointed as the world's first professor of archaeology, at Leiden University in the Kingdom of the Netherlands.

== Explorations ==
- Giovanni Battista Belzoni explores the interior of the Great Pyramid of Giza.

== Finds ==
- February 17 - The burial vault of Dunfermline Abbey in Scotland, containing the remains of Robert the Bruce, is uncovered and secured for scholarly examination.
- Ancient temple at Sanchi.
- 1818 or 1819 - Prajnaparamita of Java.

== Publications ==
- Juan Ramis publishes Antigüedades célticas de la isla de Menorca ("Celtic Antiquities of the Island of Menorca") in Mahón, the first book in the Spanish language entirely devoted to prehistory.

== See also ==
- Ancient Egypt / Egyptology
