= Kingittorsuaq Island =

Island of Greenland

Kingittorsuaq
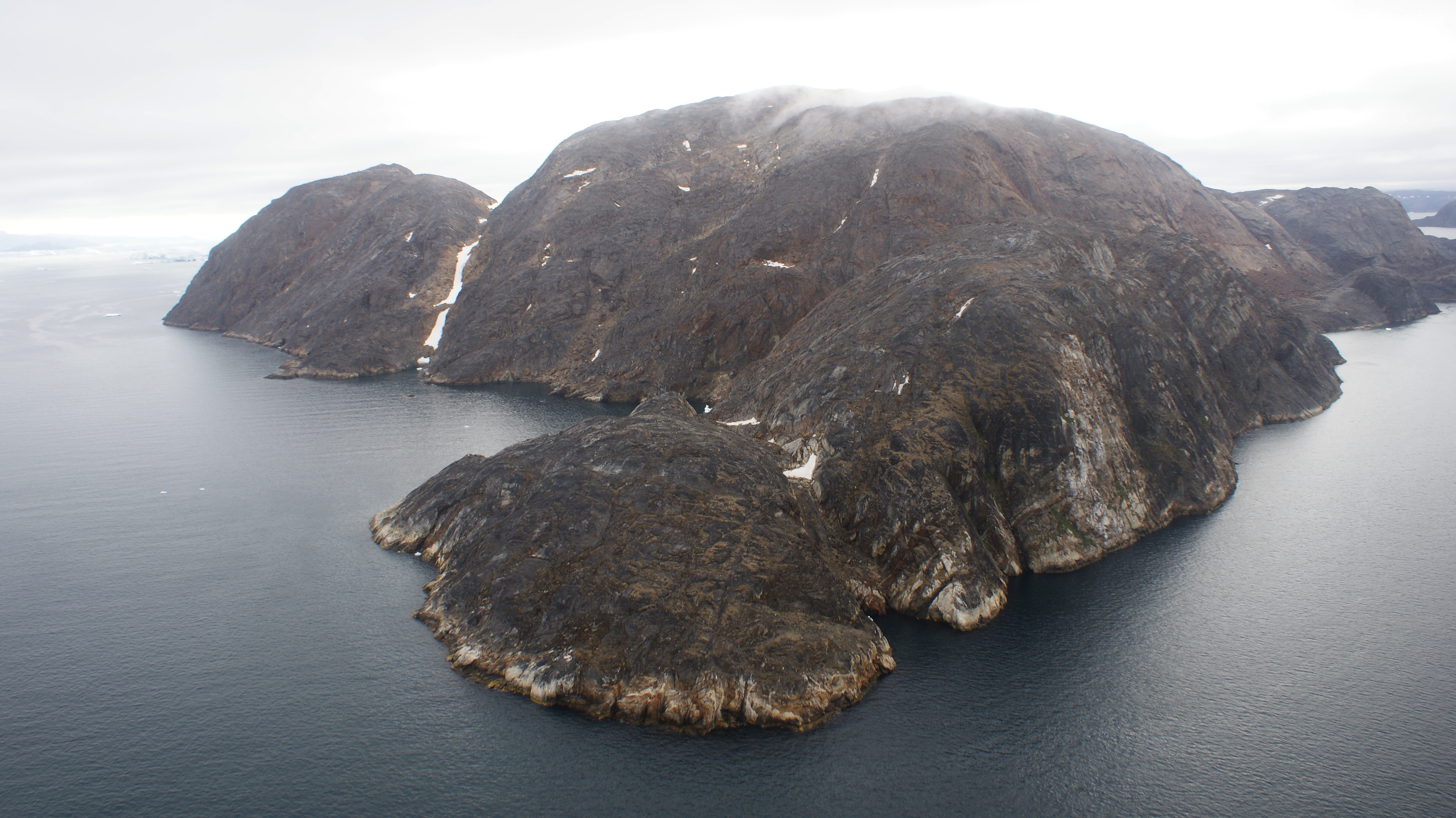
- Aerial view of Kingittorsuaq Island

- Location within Greenland

Geography
- Location: Greenland
- Coordinates: 72°57′55″N 56°12′45″W
- Archipelago: Upernavik Archipelago
- Length: 3.7 km (2.3 mi)
- Width: 2.7 km (1.68 mi)

Administration
- Greenland
- Municipality: Avannaata

Kingittorsuaq Island (old spelling: Kingigtorssuaq) is a small, uninhabited island in the Avannaata municipality in northwestern Greenland. It is a small island in the southern part of the Upernavik Archipelago, located on the southwestern shores of Upernavik Icefjord, near the mouth of the latter where it opens into Baffin Bay. The name of the island means "a large protruding rock" in the Greenlandic language.

== History ==
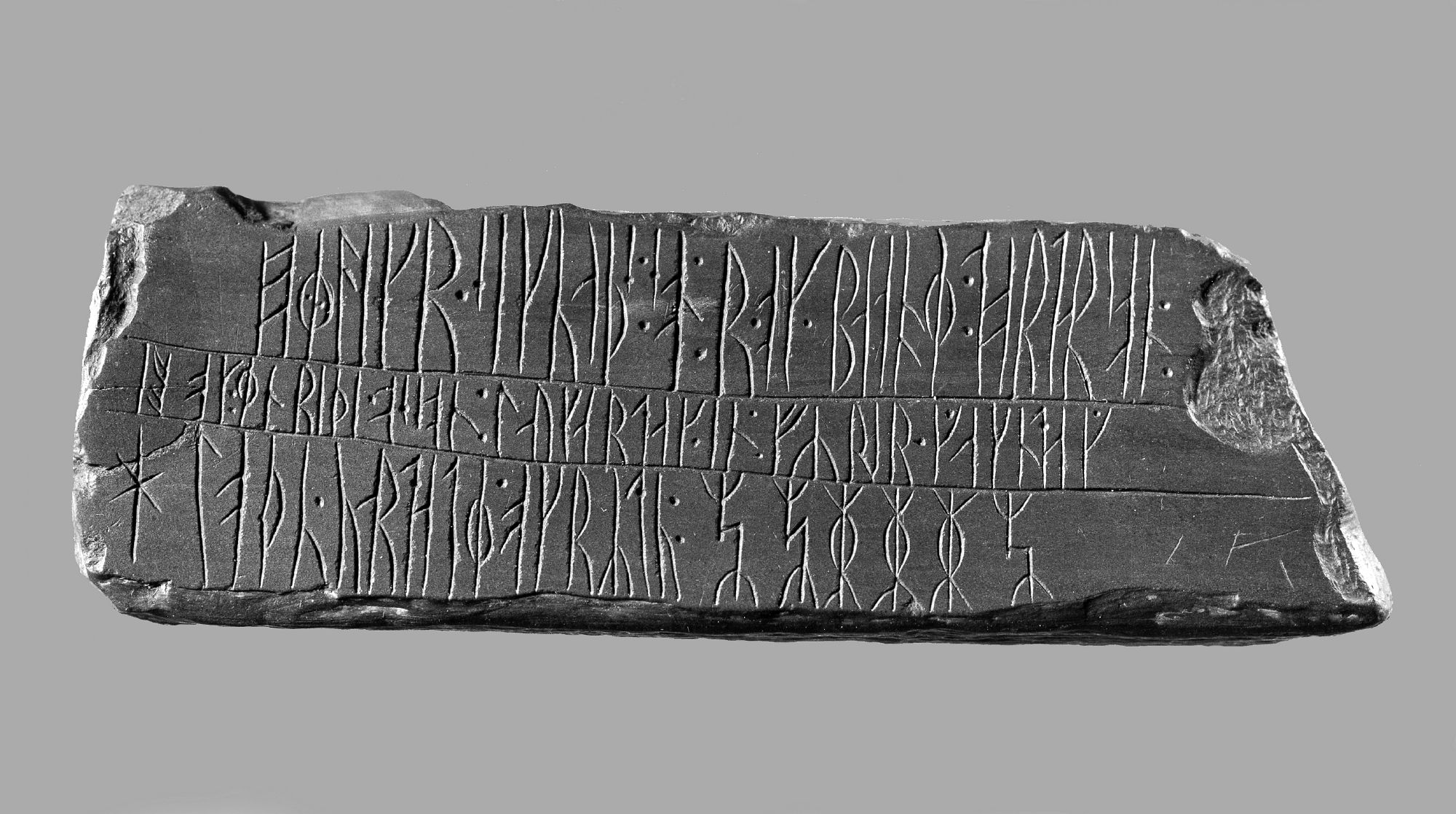
Runestone

The Kingittorsuaq runestone (old spelling: Kingigtorssuaq runestone) dating from the Middle Ages was found in 1824 on the highest point of the island, in a group of three cairns forming an equilateral triangle. The stone is now located at the National Museum of Denmark in Copenhagen.
