= 1820 in archaeology =

The year 1820 in archaeology involved some significant events.

== Excavations ==
- First excavations of the Gallo-Roman site at Grand, Vosges.

== Publications ==
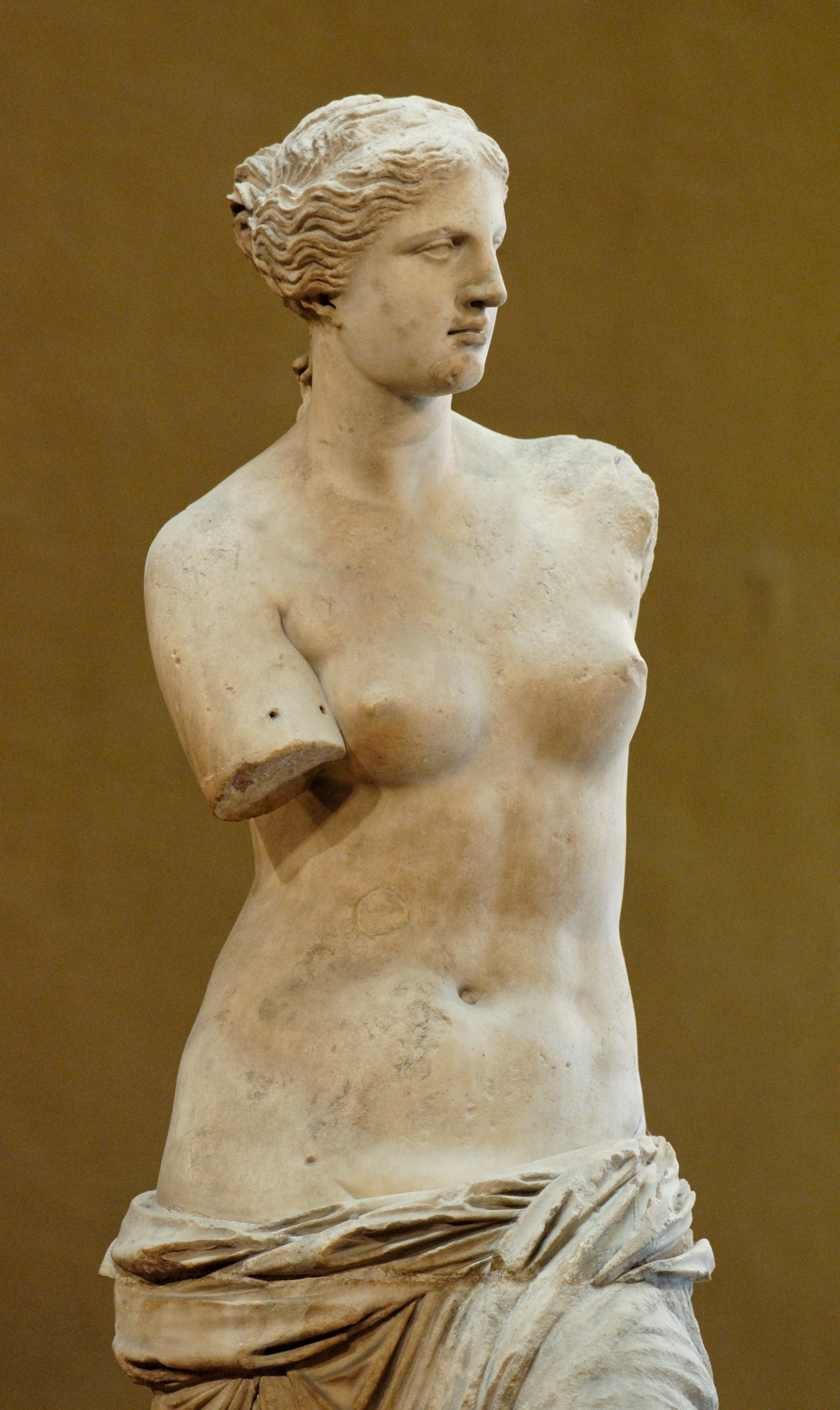
Venus de Milo (Musée du Louvre, Paris)

- Narrative of the Operations and Recent Discoveries Within the Pyramids, Temples, Tombs, and Excavations in Egypt and Nubia by Giovanni Battista Belzoni.
- First volume of the American Antiquarian Society's Transactions. Includes map and descriptions of Mound Builders remains in Ohio by Caleb Atwater.

== Finds ==
- April 3 - A 4th-century Roman Oxfordshire limestone sarcophagus reused in the 11th century for the Christian burial of a high-status figure (probably an abbot) is unearthed in the grounds of Westminster Abbey in London and broken open, but then repaired and reburied until 1869.
- April 8 - Venus de Milo (Aphrodite of Milos, c.150 BC-125 BC) is discovered on the island of Milos by a peasant named Yorgos Kentrotas.
- Statue of Ramesses II is discovered at the Great Temple of Ptah of Mit-Rahina near Memphis, Egypt by Giovanni Battista Caviglia.

== Births ==
- March 23 - Canon William Greenwell, English archaeologist notable for his Grimes Graves excavations (died 1918).
