= 1827 in archaeology =

The year 1827 CE in archaeology included many events, some of which are listed below.

== Excavations ==
- May 17 - St Cuthbert's coffin at Durham Cathedral opened by James Raine.
- Yorkshire Philosophical Society begins excavation of St Mary's Abbey, York, prior to construction of the Yorkshire Museum on part of the site.
- First recorded excavation of Snape Anglo-Saxon Cemetery in eastern England.
- Caspar Reuvens, professor of archaeology at Leiden University, begins excavation of Forum Hadriani, an important Roman site in the Netherlands, which will last into the 1830s.

== Births ==
- April 14 - Augustus Henry Lane-Fox, English archaeologist (died 1900 as Augustus Pitt Rivers).
