= 1835 in archaeology =

The year 1835 in archaeology involved some significant events.

== Explorations ==
- Henry Rawlinson begins study and decipherment from the cuneiform of the Behistun Inscription.
- Howard Vyse first visits Egypt.

== Finds ==
- Mars of Todi in Todi, Italy.
- Nike Fixing her Sandal in Athens, Greece

== Publications ==
- Juan Galindo's description of the Maya site of Copán.
- John Gardner Wilkinson - Topography of Thebes, and general view of Egypt.

== Births ==
- 25 March - Worthington George Smith, English illustrator, palaeolithic archaeologist and mycologist (died 1917).
- 22 June - Adolf Michaelis, German classical scholar (d. 1910).
- 21 July - Robert Munro, Scottish archaeologist (d. 1920).

== Deaths ==
- 26 July - Caspar Reuvens, founder of the Dutch National Museum of Antiquities and the world's first professor of archaeology, dies at Rotterdam (b. 1793).
