= 1831 in archaeology =

Below are notable events in archaeology that occurred in 1831.

== Explorations ==
- Juan Galindo explores the Maya ruins of Palenque.
- Charles Nebel makes first survey of El Tajín.

== Finds ==
- Spring: The Lewis chessmen are found in a sand-bank on the Isle of Lewis
- 24 October: The Alexander Mosaic is found in the House of the Faun, Pompeii

== Births ==
- 7 June: Amelia Edwards, English Egyptologist and fiction writer (died 1892)
