= Archaeological site of Terpsithea Square =

Archaeological site in Piraeus, Athens

- Interactive map of Archaeological site of Terpsithea Square
- Type: Street
- Periods: Classical Period to Roman period
- Satellite of: Athens
- Location: Piraeus, Athens
- Region: Attica

Site notes
- Material: Marble
- Length: 40.37 m (132.4 ft)
- Width: 47.40 m (155.5 ft)
- Condition: Ruined
- Owner: Organization of School Buildings (Organismos Scholikon Ktirion)
- Management: Ephorate of Antiquities of West Attika, Piraeus and Islands
- Public access: Visible from street

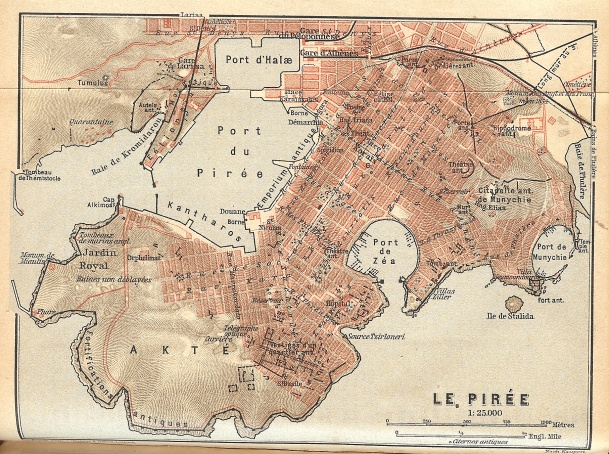
Map of Piraeus, showing the grid plan of the city

The Archaeological site of Terpsithea Square is an archaeological site which formed part of the urban fabric of the ancient settlement of Piraeus located in Attica, Greece

== History ==
The street plan was laid out to the design of Hippodamus who was a philosopher, urban planner and meteorologist.

The street plan separates a private residential zone from the naval station and the commercial and sacred areas of the port. Each urban block measured 40.37m by 47.40m and was divided into two rows of four houses.

The urban blocks formed neighbourhoods known as synoikies, which comes from the word synoecism (or synoikismos, Greek: συνοικισμός), which means the merging of smaller communities into one larger community.

Each of these neighbourhoods was accessed by a street with a width of 5m to 5.20m. These were known as Small Roads and were linked to peripheral streets with a width of 8m to 8.2m, known as Medium Roads. The whole city was bisected by two main streets of 16.5m known as plateies odoi, or Large Roads. These linked the public areas of the city with the main entrances to the city.

== Location and discovery ==
The site belongs to the Organization of School Buildings (Organismos Scholikon Ktirion) and excavations were undertaken during the building of the Ralleios School, in 1995-6 and 200–2001. The excavations revealed an entire urban block of the Classical Period together with different types of underground cisterns showing the evolution of the city's drainage system which included a sewerage pipeline.

The excavated site has two parallel Small Roads, one to the south with urban blocks located either side of it, and one to the north. The Small Road to the south runs parallel to the present-day Skouze Street.

== Roman Period ==
During the Roman period some of the plots on the eastern part of the site were consolidated and a large Roman mansion was built. The mansion covered the same area as four classical houses. This mansion has an atrium with a central peristyle and pebble floor. A portico gives access to the rooms of the mansion. The mansion was probably destroyed during the Sack of Athens (267 AD), based on the evidence of the many coins found on the site and which date from this time.

== Finds ==
A votive naiskos of Cybele, marble statuettes of Aphrodite and clay figurines of Eros have been found on site. These indicate that the Mother of Gods and Aphrodite were household cults. Other coins found on the site date from the fifth century BC to the 4th century AD.

== Gallery ==
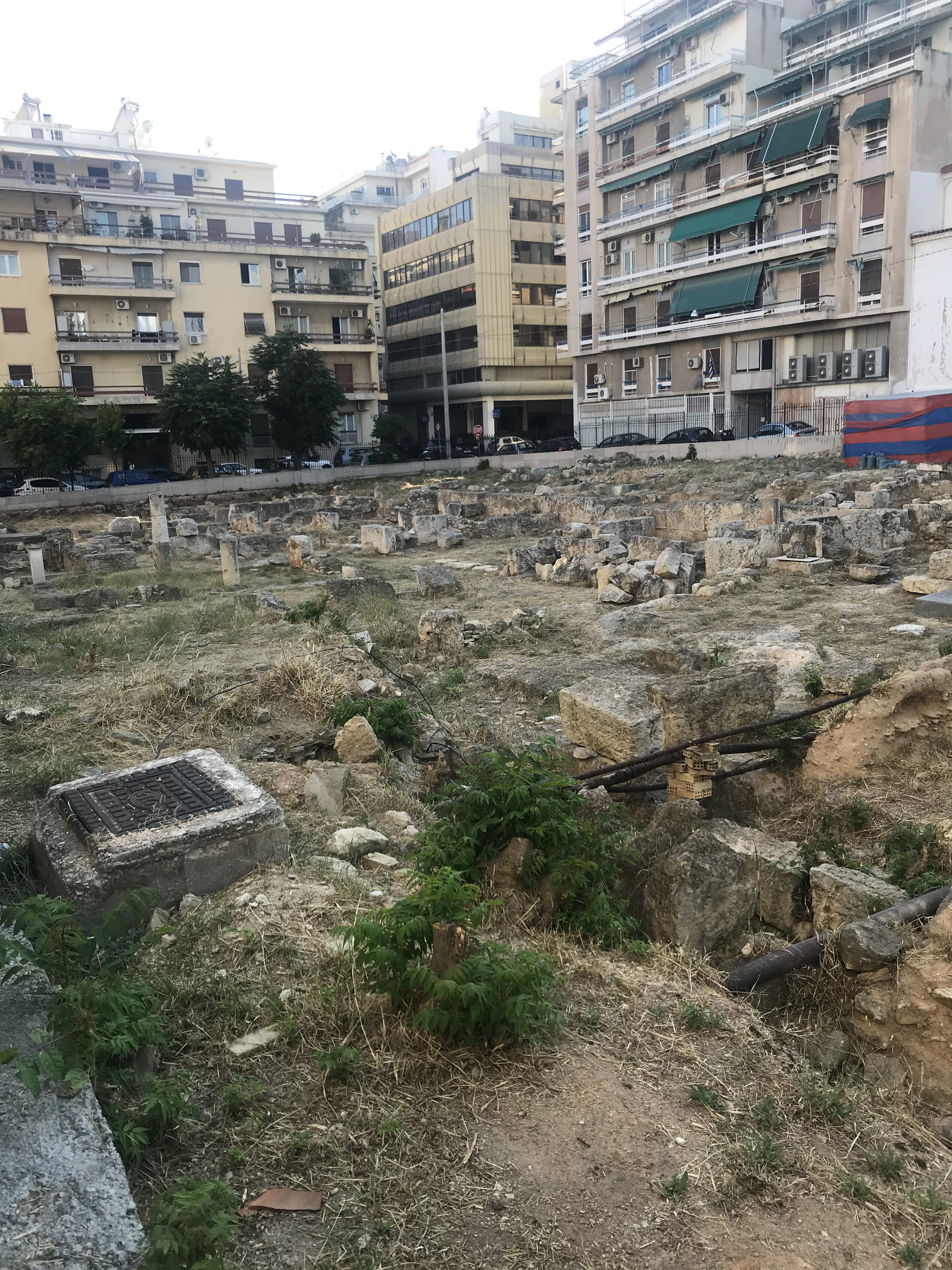
General view of the site

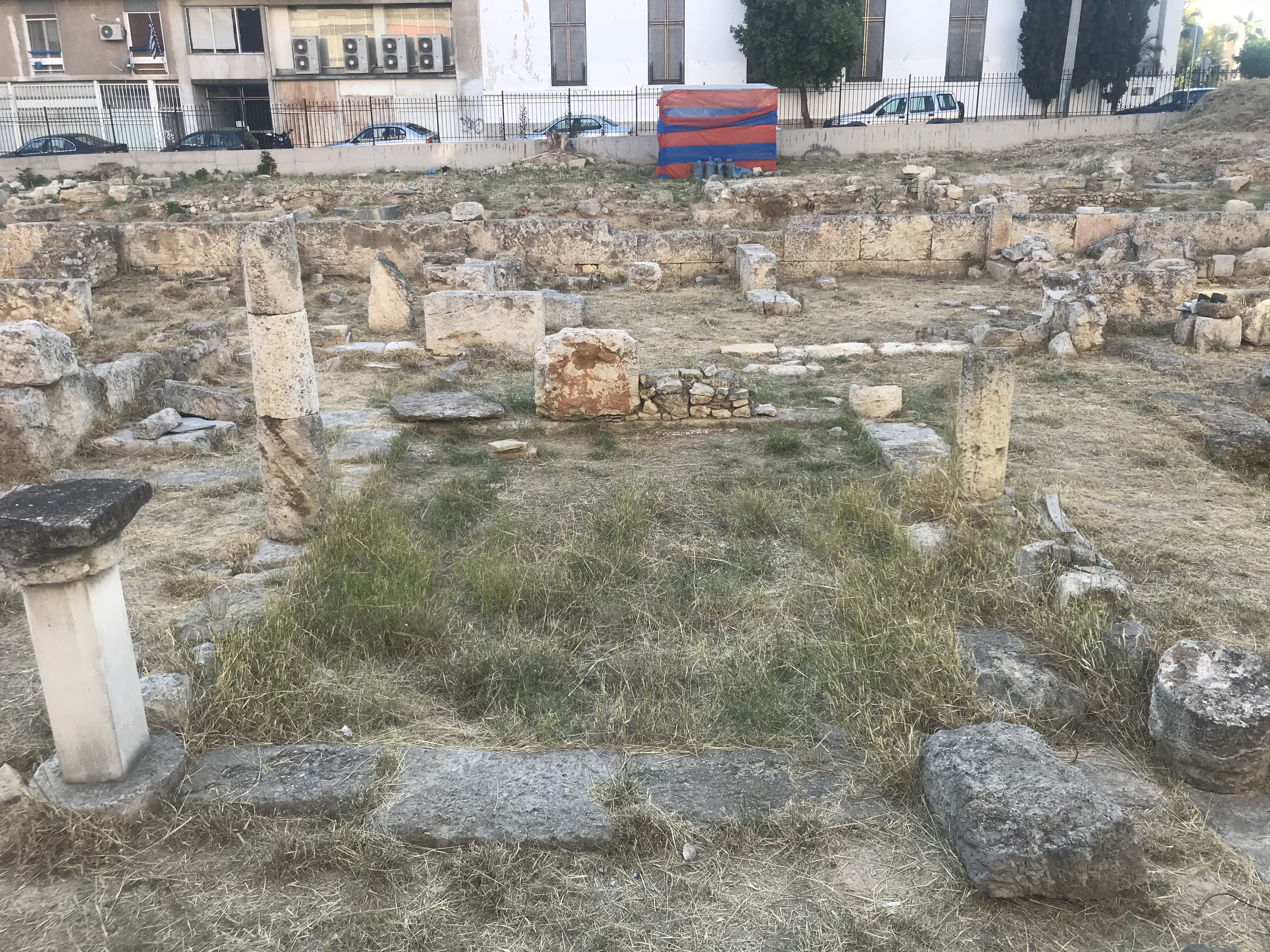
View of the atrium of the Roman mansion

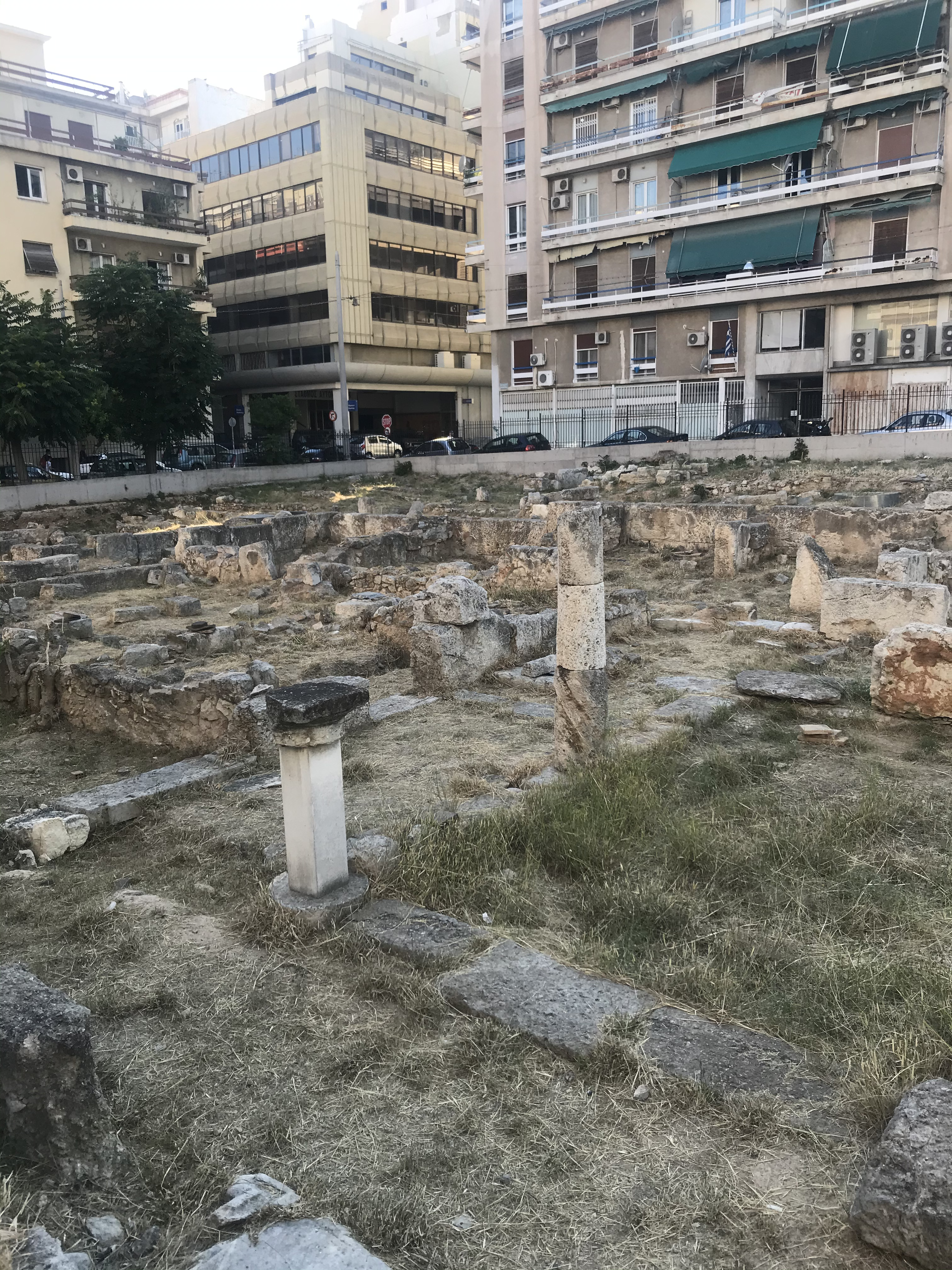
View of the atrium of the Roman mansion

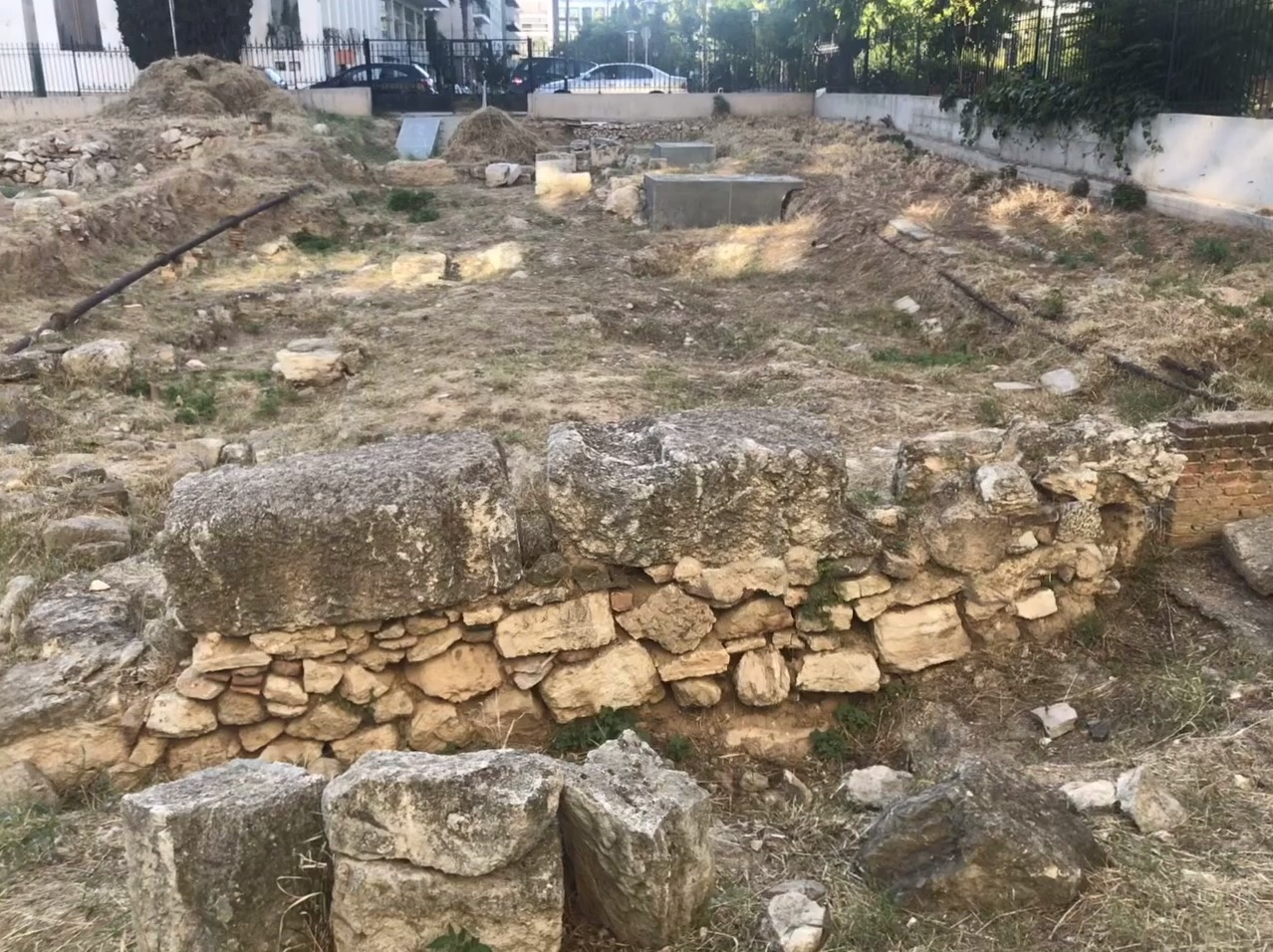
View of wall, probably of a classical era house
