= Franz Winter =

German archaeologist (1861-1930)

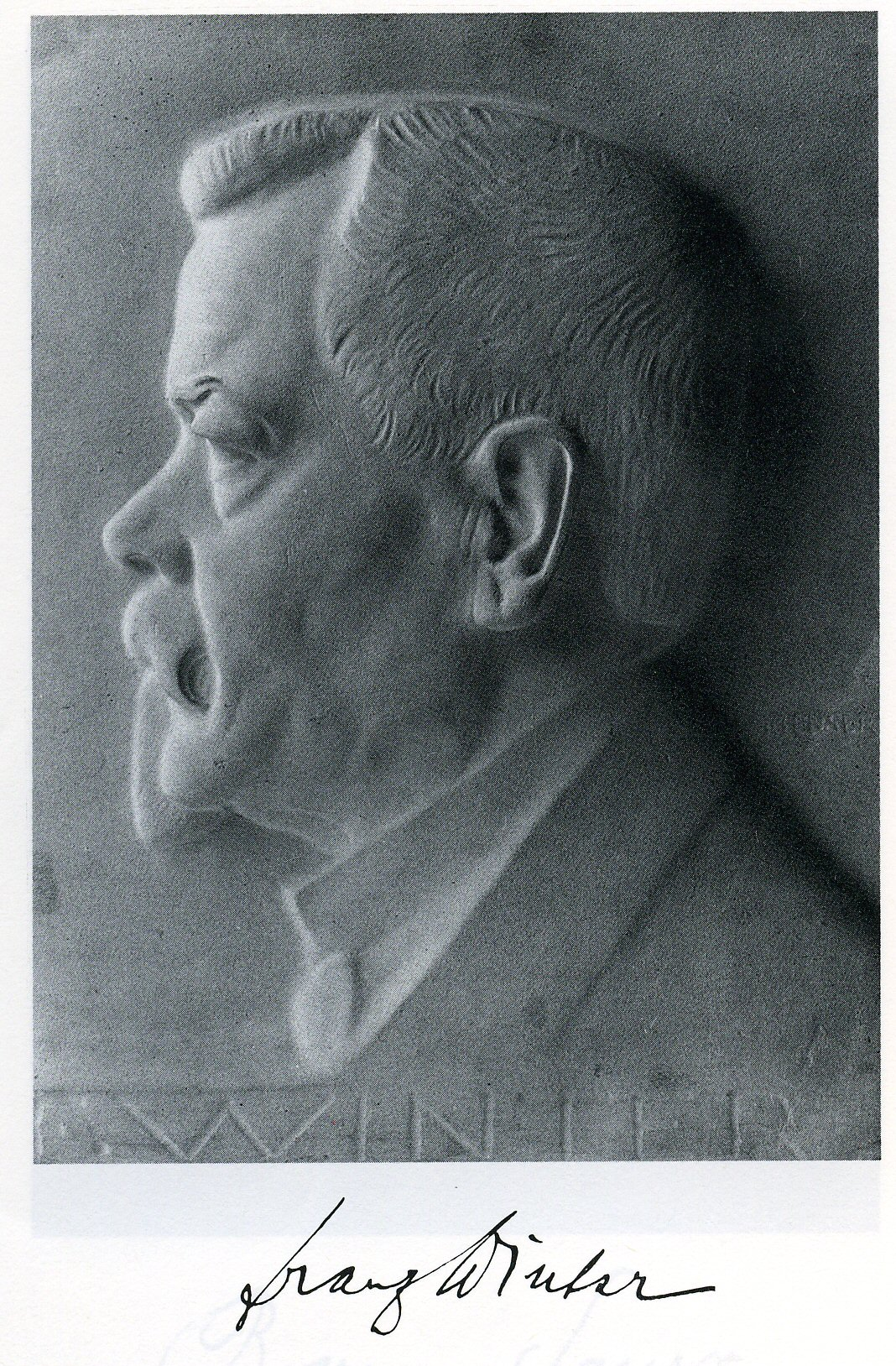
Franz Winter (1861–1930)

Franz Winter (4 February 1861 in Braunschweig – 11 February 1930 in Bonn) was a German archaeologist. He specialized in ancient Greek and Roman art, being particularly known for his analyses of individual statues, such as the Apollo Belvedere.

He studied ancient history in Zurich, Munich and Bonn, receiving his doctorate in 1885 with a dissertation on the playwright Plautus. By way of a suggestion from Reinhard Kekulé von Stradonitz, he was tasked by the directorate of the German Archaeological Institute with compiling a typological catalog of classical terracotta works.

Beginning in 1890, he worked with Kekulé at the Royal Museums in Berlin, followed by professorships at Innsbruck (from 1897) Graz (from 1905) and Strasbourg (from 1907). In 1912 he succeeded Georg Loeschcke as chair of archaeology at the University of Bonn.

== Selected works ==
- "Plauti Fabularum deperditarum fragmenta", (lost fragments of Titus Maccius Plautus), 1885.
- Die jüngeren attischen Vasen und ihr Verhältnis zur grossen Kunst, 1885 – The newer Attican vases and their relationship to major art.
- Eine attische Lekythos des Berliner Museums, 1895 – An Attican Lekythos of the Berlin Museum.
- Altertümer von Hierapolis (with Carl Humann; Conrad Cichorius; Walther Judeich), 1898 – Antiquities of Hierapolis.
- Kunstgeschichte in Bildern; systematische Darstellung der Entwickelung der bildenden Kunst vom klassischen Altertum bis zum Ende des 18. Jahrhunderts, (with Georg Dehio) 5 volumes, 1898–1902. – Art history in pictures; systematic exposition on the development of visual art from classical antiquity to the end of the 18th century.
- Die Skulpturen mit Ausnahme der Altarreliefs, 1908 – Sculpture, with the exception of altar reliefs.
- Der tod des Archimedes, 1924 – The death of Archimedes.
