= Carl Humann =

German engineer, architect and archaeologist

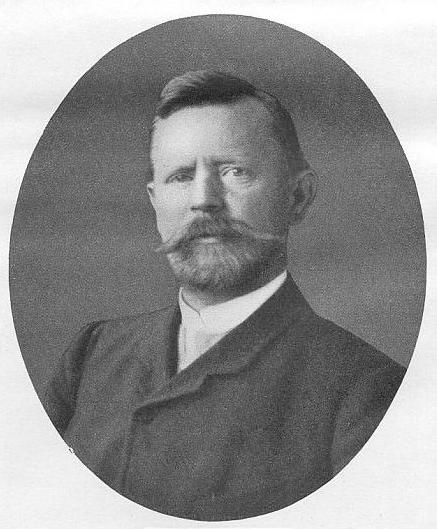
- Carl Humann
- Born: 4 January 1839; Essen
- Died: 12 April 1896 (aged 57); İzmir
- Known for: Pergamon Altar
- Scientific career
- Fields: Archaeology

Carl Humann (first name also Karl; 4 January 1839 – 12 April 1896) was a German engineer, architect and archaeologist. He found and excavated the Pergamon Altar.

== Biography ==
=== Early years ===
Humann was born in Steele, part of today's Essen - Germany. An educated railroad engineer and aspiring architecture student, he worked initially on the construction of the Bergisch-Märkische Railway—a position he got through help from his older brother Franz, who had been working there—and later attended the Building-Academy in Berlin. Due to him falling ill to tuberculosis, he looked for warmer climates and moved to the then Ottoman Empire and settled down in Istanbul. He participated in excavations on the island of Samos—joining his brother Franz, who had been working on the Heraion sanctuary—, building palaces and travelling in 1864 through Palestine, under order of the Ottoman Empire, drawing up accurate maps of the area. His work as a surveyor for the railway and road construction departments helped him gain a personal familiarity with classical-era ruins, as well as develop an extensive network of contacts and acquaintances.

He never studied archaeology or took an advanced degree of any kind, exemplifying the nineteenth-century self-made archaeologist, akin to Heinrich Schliemann and Wilhelm Dörpfeld. He was representative of a generation of rough and ready pioneers, who had developed an antipathy for philologists and got easily aggravated by their slow and careful approach to excavations (Schuchhardt, 1931). On the other hand, Humann established extensive connections throughout the whole of the Ottoman Empire, with local officials as well as workmen, which earned him the nickname “Viceroy of Asia Minor” and the very important esteem of the director of the Turkish Museums, Osman Hamdi Bey (Schulte, 1974).

=== Pergamon ===
From 1867 until 1873 he supervised the construction of roads in Anatolia. As part of his preparation, he visited in the winter of 1864/65 the site of the antique Pergamon. In this historical site, he used his influence to stop the destruction of the partly unearthed marble ruins. Although he already showed a high interest in starting excavations in this area, he still needed the official support from Berlin.

Finally, in 1878, he received the backing from the director of the Berlin Sculpture Museum and financial support from Alexander Conze, as well as the official permits from the Ottoman government, to start excavations in September of the same year. During this initial work, large parts of the artistically extremely valuable frieze of the altar and numerous sculptures were found. Following this success, a second and third excavation missions were carried out, from 1880-1881 and 1883-1886 (assisted by Wilhelm Dörpfeld) respectively. The findings, which by agreement with the Ottoman government became property of the German archaeologists, were transported in carriages to the coast and then loaded onto German Navy ships and taken to Berlin.

Back in the German Empire, the finding of the great altar, recognised to be one of the finest examples of Hellenistic sculpture, garnered significant attention and made Humann instantly famous. Against the nationalistic backdrop of the time the findings awoke a strong feeling of pride, especially as something to boast against the Parthenon frieze in London's British Museum.

=== Later Expeditions ===
On behalf of the Berlin Academy of Sciences, Humann later made recordings of the ancient archaeological sites of Angora, in both the upper Euphrates as well as northern Syria. In 1882 he carried out excavations for the German Oriental Society in Sam'al (modern Zincirli). Later, in 1884 he became department director of the Royal Museum in Berlin responsible for all Prussian archaeological expeditions in the Near East, but he retained his residence in Smyrna (modern İzmir), in order to protect the interests of the royal museums in area.

He continued to work and expanded his research during his time in Smyrna, and became a world-renowned host of foreign guests to the area. He worked in June and July 1887 on the site of Hierapolis. In 1888 he directed further excavations in Sam'al and a trial-excavation in Tralles (modern Aydın). Between 1891 and 1893 he conducted the excavations that lead to the discovery of the Magnesia on the Maeander, as well as the later expeditions of Priene (1895), and with Otto Benndorf of Ephesus (1895).

== Personal life and death ==
Carl Humann married Louise Werner in 1874 and together they had two children. Maria Humann (1875-1971), who married the archaeologist Friedrich Sarre in 1901, and Hans Humann (1878-1933), who became an officer of the Imperial German Navy, naval attaché, diplomat as well as businessman.

Carl Humann died on 12 April 1896 in Smyrna (today İzmir), in Turkey, and was buried in the Catholic cemetery in İzmir. His remains were reinterred at Pergamon in 1967, just south of the altar.

A bust of Carl Humann was created by Adolf Brütt in 1901, to coincide with the completion of the Siegesallee and the opening of the Pergamon Museum in Berlin. A replica of this bust can be found in the Kaiser-Otto-Platz in Steele, while the Carl-Humann-Gymnasium in Essen and the Carl-Humann-School in Berlin were named after the archaeologist. Despite all the praise that Humann received during his lifetime and posthumously, the Institute for Archaeological Correspondence never made him a ‘Fellow’ but accepted his membership merely as ‘Architect’ (Marchard, 2003).

== Bibliography ==
- Carl Humann, Richard Bohn & Max Fränkel (1888). Die Ergebnisse der Ausgrabungen zu Pergamon. Berlin: Grote’sche.
- Carl Humann, Conrad Cichorius, Walther Judeich & Franz Winter (1898). Altertümer von Hierapolis. Berlin: Reimer.
- Carl Humann & Otto Puchstein (1890). Reisen in Kleinasien und Nordsyrien. Berlin: Reimer.
- Carl Humann, Julius Kohte & Carl Watzinger (1904). Magnesia am Mäander. Berlin: Reimer.
- Carl Humann (1954). Der Pergamnon Altar: Entdeckt, beschrieben und gezeichnet. Dortmund: Ardey Verlag.
- Carl Schuchhardt & Theodor Wiegand, (1931). Der Entdecker von Pergamon. Berlin.
- Schulte, Edward (1974). Neu Deutsche Biographie 10, Vol. 33.
- Marchard, S. L. (2003). Down from Olympus: Archaeology and Philhellenism in Germany, 1750–1970. Princeton: University Press.
