= Diateichisma =

Addition to city walls of ancient Athens in the 280s BC

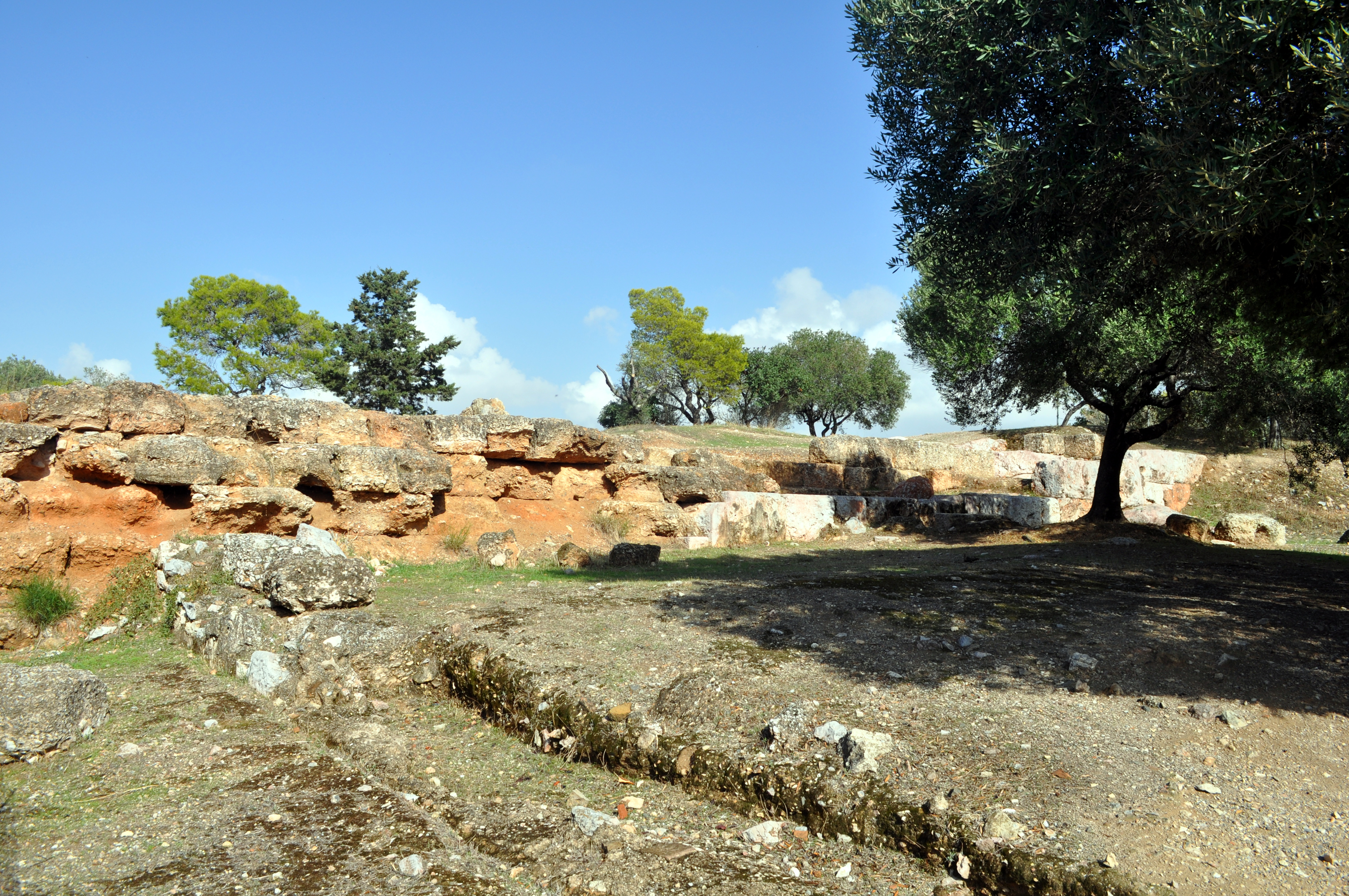
Remains of the Diateichisma today

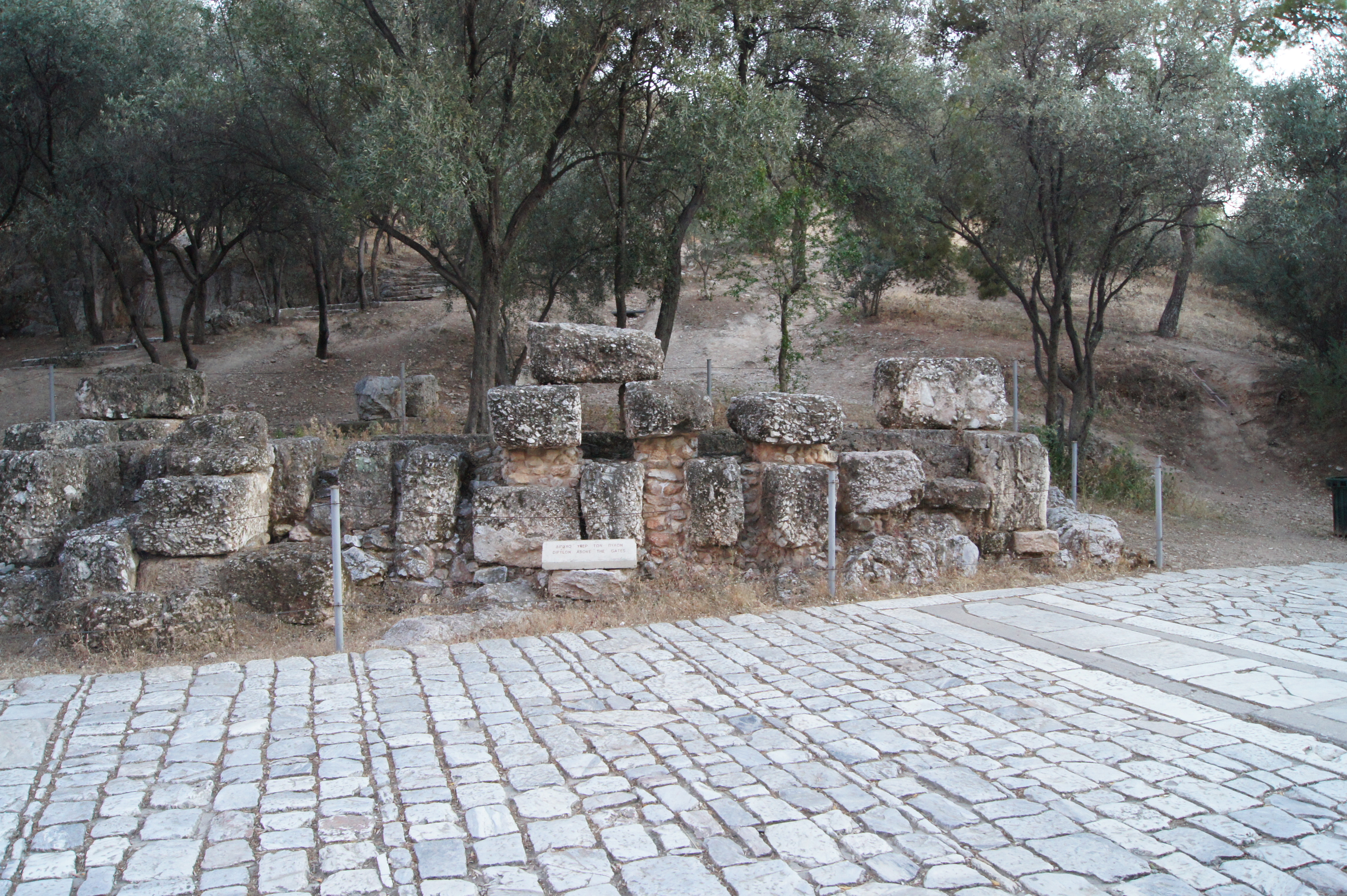
South gate of the Diateichisma

The Diateichisma (Greek: διατείχισμα, lit. 'cross wall') was an addition to the city walls of Athens constructed in the 280s BC.

The Diateichisma was built after the Battle of Chaeronea (338 BC). It was 900m long and built across the crests of the three hills: that of the Muses, of the Nymphs, and the Pnyx. It joined the Themistoclean Wall at north and south and had square and circular towers and two gates. However it cut through inhabited suburbs of ancient Athens, leaving the demes of Melete and Koile outside the wall and vulnerable.

The south gate in the valley between the hill of the Muses and the Pnyx was for the most important commercial Koile road of Athens which led to the port of Piraeus. Remains of the gate can still be seen. The north Melitides gate was in the valley between the other two hills.

In 294 BC, a small fort was built on the top of the Muses' hill for the Macedonian guard of Demetrius Poliorcetes, using the junction of the wall with the Themistoclean Wall on two sides joined to a new wall with towers.
