= Themistoclean Wall =

Building in ancient Greece

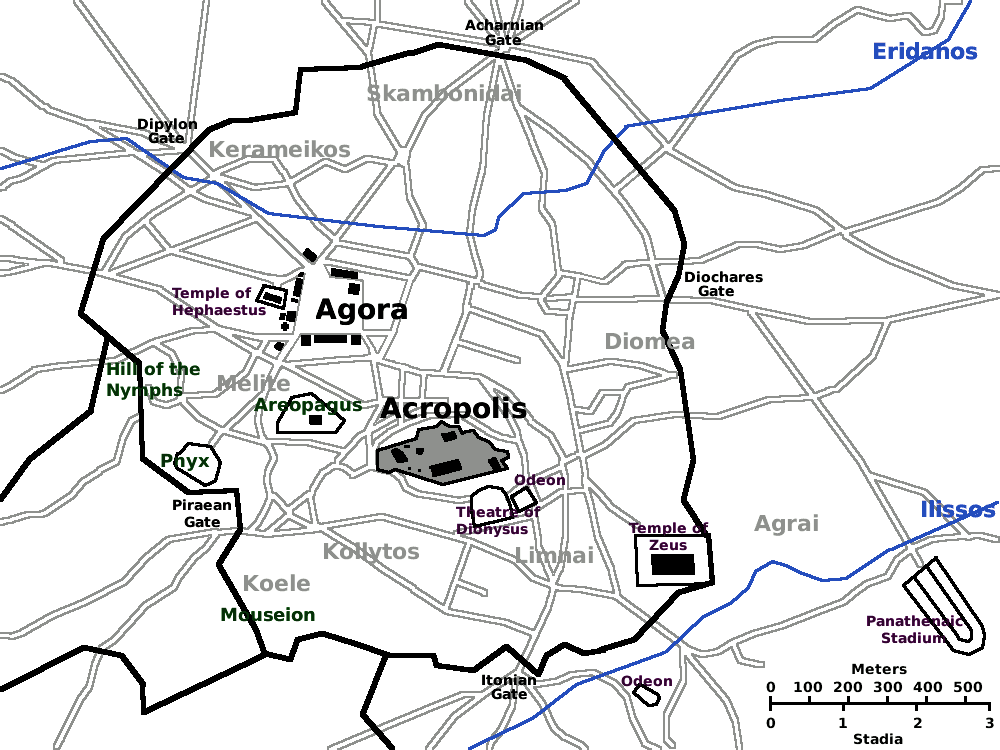
Map of the Themistoclean Wall with the later Diateichisma

The Themistoclean Wall (Greek: Θεμιστόκλειον τείχος), named after the Athenian statesman Themistocles, was built in Athens, Greece during the 5th century BC as a result of the Persian Wars and in the hopes of defending against further invasion.

== History ==
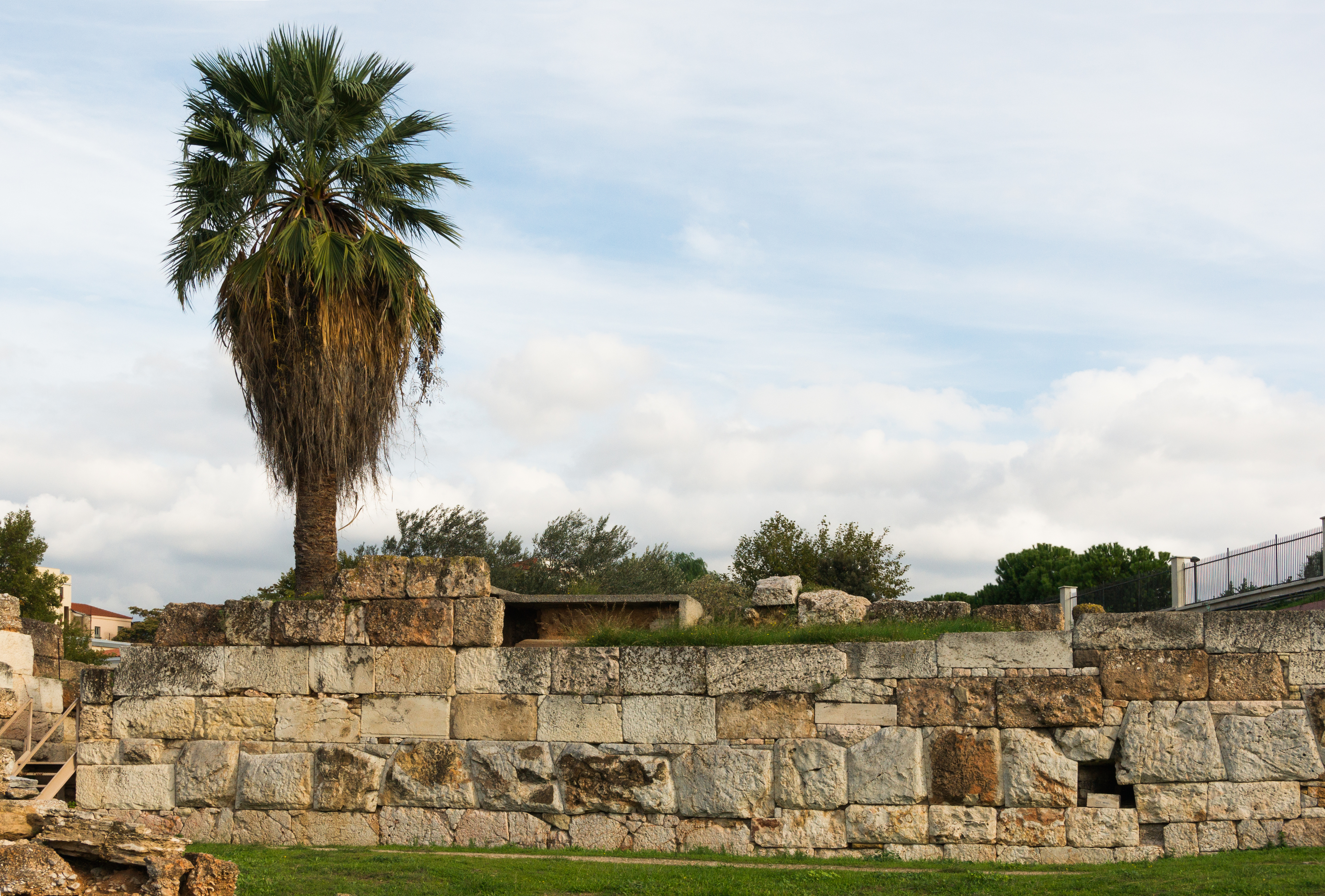
Ruins of the Themistoclean Wall in Athens, Greece, named after the 5th-century-BC Athenian statesman and general Themistocles

The Persian Wars were waged by the Achaemenid Empire of Persia in an attempt to conquer the Greeks. King Darius I was unsuccessful in his invasion attempt and was followed by his son, Xerxes I, who led the Second Persian Wars which lasted from 480 to 479 BC. Xerxes saw more victories than his father, successfully burning down Athens. Following the Persian Wars the Greek city states were left in disarray. Many buildings, statues, and fortifications of the Greek city states were destroyed.

The people of Athens were worried by a return of the Persians, and Themistocles advocated rebuilding the walls before anything else so they decided to act upon this plan. This project was opposed by the Spartans and their Peloponnesian allies alarmed by the increasing power of Athens, arguing that a walled Athens would be a useful base for an invading army, and that the defences of the Isthmus of Corinth would provide a sufficient shield against invaders. The Athenians went ahead to protect themselves from the Peloponnesians; Thucydides, in his account of these events, describes a series of complex machinations by Themistocles through which he distracted and delayed the Spartans until the walls were built up high enough to provide adequate protection.

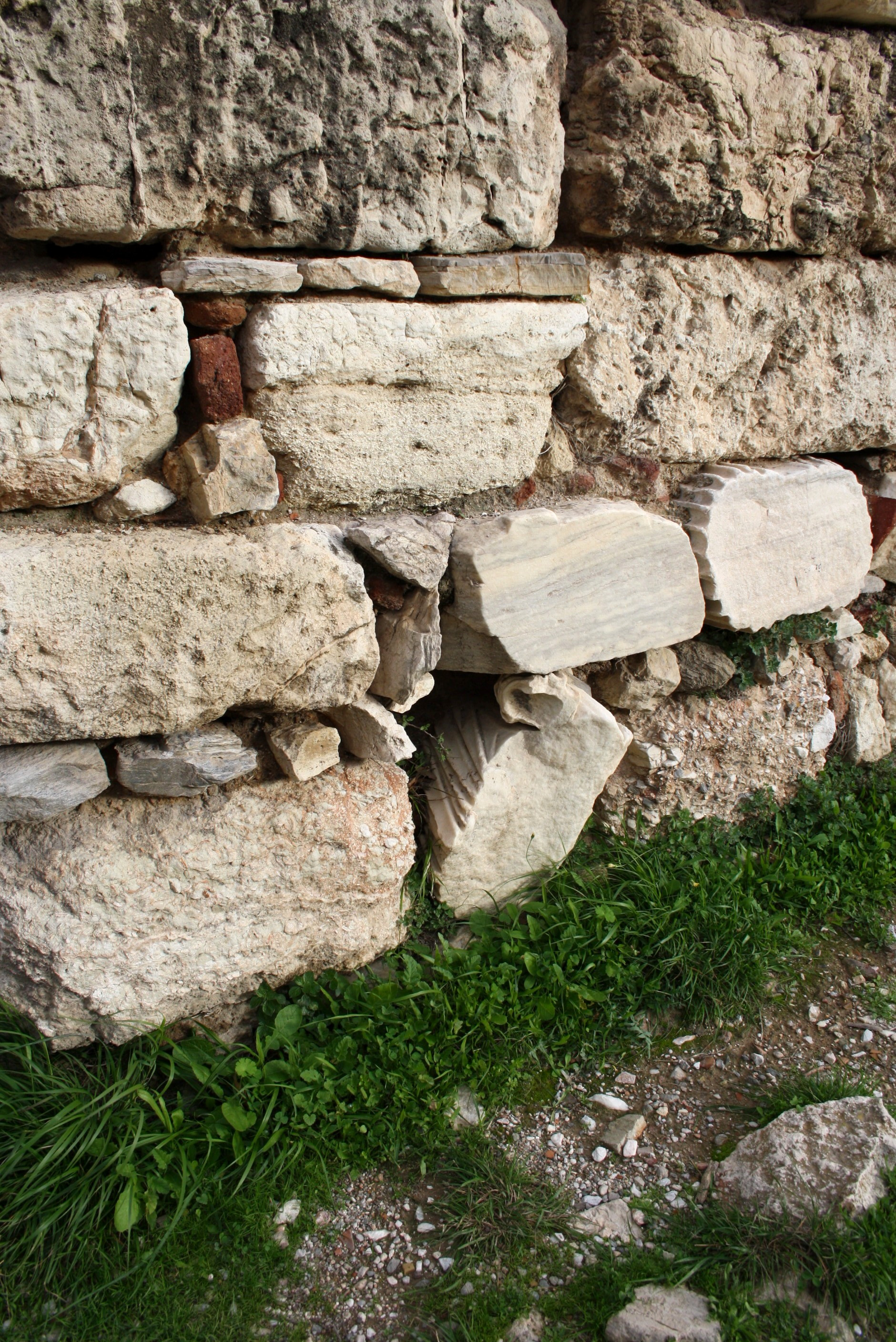
Use of spolia at the Odeion of Agrippa in Athens

The Themistoclean Wall was completed in 471 BC and built with spolia, old materials, in this case destroyed temples, statues, and other ruins because of the rushed nature of the work and the readily available material. It had a total length of 8500 m, height 8–10 m, width 3m and had at least 13 gates.

The wall bisected the Kerameikos cemetery, where all of the funerary sculptures were built into it and two large city gates facing north-west were erected. The Sacred Way ran through the Sacred Gate, on the southern side, to Eleusis. On the northern side a wide road, the Dromos, ran through the double-arched Dipylon Gate (also known as the Thriasian Gate) and on to the Platonic Academy a few miles away.

After their defeat in the Peloponnesian War in 404 BC the Athenians had to destroy all the walls. However, when democracy was re-established Conon repaired the city walls in 394 BC. Facing the Macedonian invasion in 338 BC, a smaller wall, the Proteichisma, was built in front of the main one as an extra defence.

The walls were badly damaged when Sulla besieged and attacked the city in 86 BC. They were eventually rebuilt along some sections by Valerian (253-260 AD).

== Visible remains ==
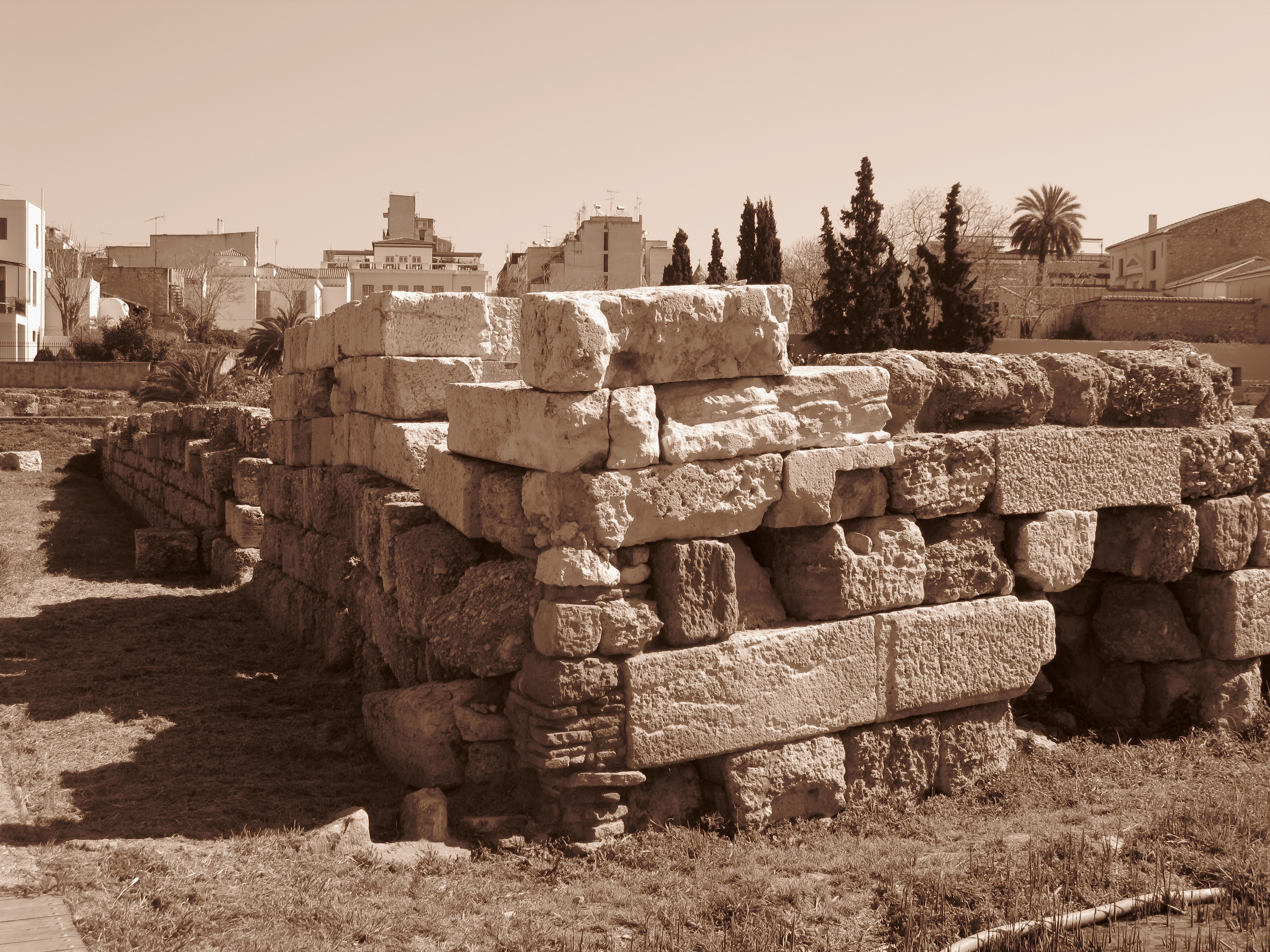
Themistoclean Wall at the Kerameikos

The main visible remains are:

- in the Kerameikos, the highest remaining section
- on the Pnyx (foundations)
- near Kotzia square, near the Acharnian gate visible in the basement of National Bank on Aiolou Street
- at 29 Erysichthonos; a section in a house basement which was just north of the Peiraic Gate

== Gates ==
The Themistoclean Wall had a number of gates, many of which have been excavated in whole or in part. The most important were:

- Dipylon Gate (Δίπυλον, "Double Gate"), originally the Thriasian Gates (Θριάσιαι Πύλαι)
- Sacred Gate (Ἱερὰ Πύλη)
- Peiraic Gate (Πειραϊκαὶ Πύλαι, "Gate of Piraeus")
- Demian Gate (Δήμιαι Πύλαι, "Gate of the Executioner")
- Eriai Gate (Ήριαι Πύλαι, "Gate of the Graves")
- Acharnian Gate (Ἀχαρνικαὶ Πύλαι, "Gate of Acharnae")
- Northeastern Gate (modern name, ancient name unknown)
- Diochares Gate (Διοχάρους Πύλαι), not excavated
- Hippades Gate (Ἱππάδες Πύλαι, "Gate of the Riders") or Gate of Aegeus (Αἰγέως Πύλαι)
- Diomeian Gate (Διόμιαι Πύλαι, "Gate of Diomeia"), not excavated
- Itonian Gate (Ἰτώνιαι Πύλαι)
- Halade Gate (Ἅλαδε Πύλαι) or eastern Phaleric Gate (Φαληρική Πύλη), not excavated
- South Gate (modern name, ancient name unknown) or western Phaleric Gate (Φαληρική Πύλη)
- Dipylon above the Gates (Δίπυλον το ὑπέρ τῶν Πυλῶν)
- Melitides Gate (Μελίτιδαι Πύλαι, "Gate of Melite")

== See also ==
- City walls of Athens

== Sources ==
- Peck, Harry T. “Athenae.” Harpers Dictionary of Classical Antiquities, Harper and Brothers, 1898., Perseus.
- Neer, Richard T. Greek Art and Archaeology: a New History, c. 2500-c. 150 BCE. Thames & Hudson, 2012.
- Wees, Hans Van. Greek Warfare: Myths and Realities. Gerald Duckworth & Co., 2004.
- Sage, Michael M. Warfare in Ancient Greece: A Sourcebook. Routledge, 1996.
- Judeich, Walther (1931). Topographie von Athen (in German) (2nd ed.). Munich: Beck.
- Theocharaki, Anna Maria (2011). "The Ancient Circuit Wall of Athens: Its Changing Course and the Phases of Construction". Hesperia: The Journal of the American School of Classical Studies at Athens. 80 (1): 71–156. doi:10.2972/hesp.80.1.0071. JSTOR 10.2972/hesp.80.1.0071.
- Winter, F. E. (1971). Greek Fortifications. Routledge & Kegan Paul. ISBN 978-0-608154244.
