= City walls of Athens =

List of defensive walls around Athens, Greece

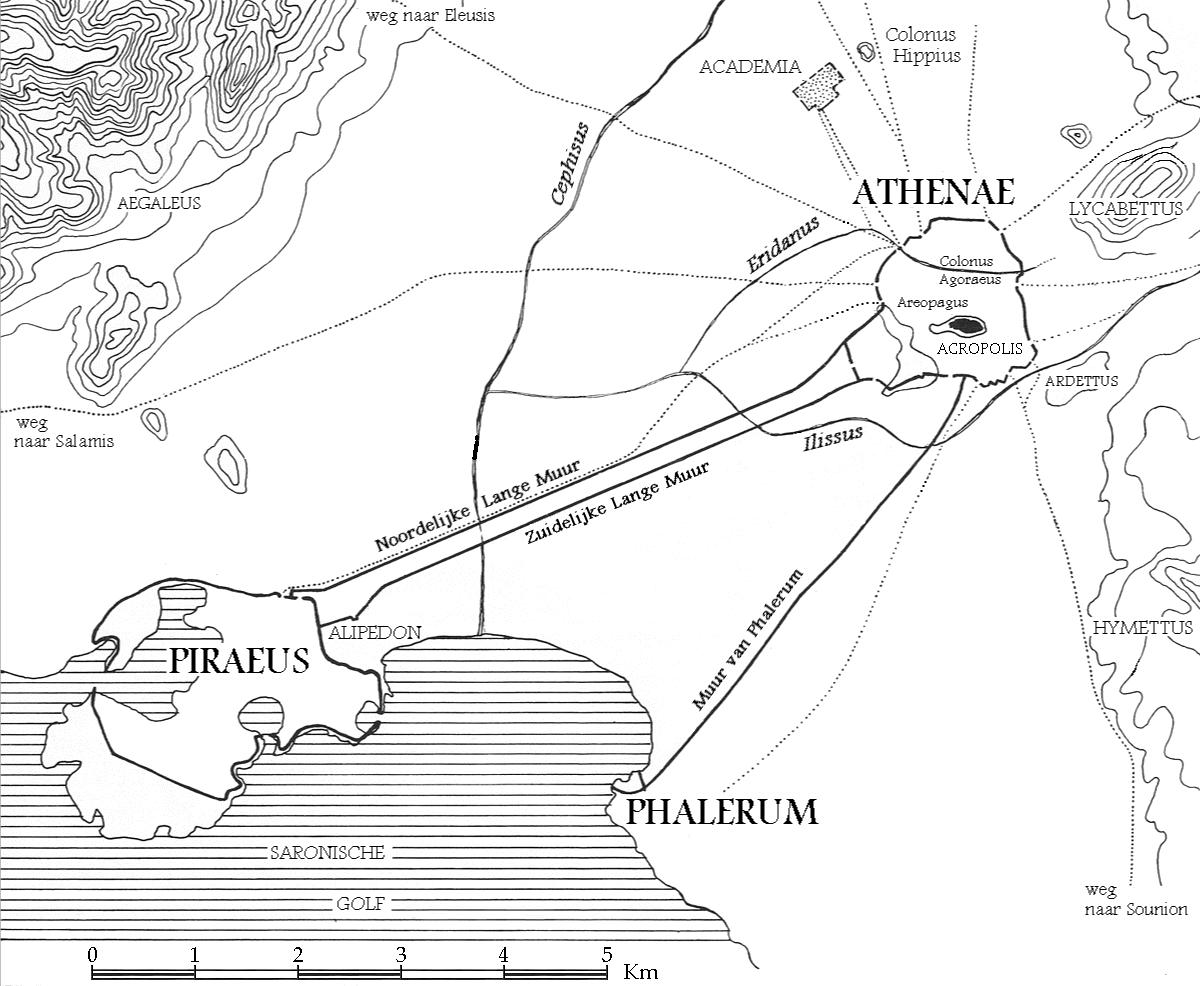
The fortifications of Classical Athens, including the Themistoclean Wall around the city and the Long Walls

The city of Athens, capital of modern Greece, has had different sets of city walls from the Bronze Age to the early 19th century. The city walls of Athens include:

- the Mycenaean Cyclopean fortifications of the Acropolis of Athens
- the Pelasgic wall at the foot of the Acropolis
- the so-called "Archaic Wall", whose existence and course are debated by scholars
- the Themistoclean Wall, built in 479 BC, the main city wall during Antiquity, restored and rebuilt several times (under Conon, Demosthenes, Demetrios Poliorketes, etc.)
- the Long Walls, built in the 460s and 440s BC, connecting Athens with its ports at Piraeus and Phaleron
- the Protocheisma, a second wall built in front of the Themistoclean Wall in 338 BC as an extra defence against the Macedonians
- the Diateichisma, built in the 280s BC as a second line of defence against Macedonian-held Piraeus
- the Valerian Wall, built in c. 260 AD, partly along the lines of older walls, partly as a new fortification, to protect the city against barbarian attacks
- the Herulian (or Post-Herulian) Wall, a much smaller circuit built in c. 280 AD, enclosing the centre of the ancient city following its sack by the Heruli in 267 AD
- the Rizokastro, built in the 13th century around the Acropolis
- the Wall of Haseki, constructed in 1778 by the Ottoman governor of Athens, Hadji Ali Haseki

== Gates ==
- Dipylon
- Sacred Gate

== Sources ==
- Judeich, Walther (1931). Topographie von Athen (in German) (2nd ed.). Munich: Beck.
- Maier, Franz Georg (1959-1961). Griechische Mauerbauinschriften [Greek building inscriptions of city walls]. 2 volumes. Vestigia, vol. 1/2. Heidelberg: Quelle & Meyer (on Athens especially volume 1, pp. 15-84).
- Rous, Sarah A. (2019). Reset in Stone: Memory and Reuse in Ancient Athens. Madison: University of Wisconsin Press. pp. 57–61. ISBN 978-0-299-32280-9.
- Papadopoulos, J. K. (2008). "The Archaic Walls of Athens. Reality or Myth?" (PDF). Opuscula. Annual of the Swedish Institutes at Athens and Rome. 1: 31–46. doi:10.30549/opathrom-01-03. Archived from the original (PDF) on 2017-12-28.
- Theocharaki, Anna Maria (2011). "The Ancient Circuit Wall of Athens: Its Changing Course and the Phases of Construction". Hesperia: The Journal of the American School of Classical Studies at Athens. 80 (1): 71–156. doi:10.2972/hesp.80.1.0071. JSTOR 10.2972/hesp.80.1.0071.
- Theocharaki, Anna Maria (2019). The Ancient Circuit Wall of Athens. Berlin and Boston: De Gruyter. ISBN 978-3-11-063321-4.
- Weir, Robert G. A. (1995). "The Lost Archaic Wall around Athens". Phoenix. 49 (3): 247–258. doi:10.2307/1192524. JSTOR 1192524.
- Winter, F. E. (1971). Greek Fortifications. Routledge & Kegan Paul. ISBN 978-0-608154244.
