= Bema =

Elevated platform used as an orator's podium

A bema is an elevated platform used as an orator's podium. The term can refer to the raised area in a sanctuary. In Jewish synagogues, where it is used for Torah reading during services, the term used is bima or bimah.

== Ancient Greece ==
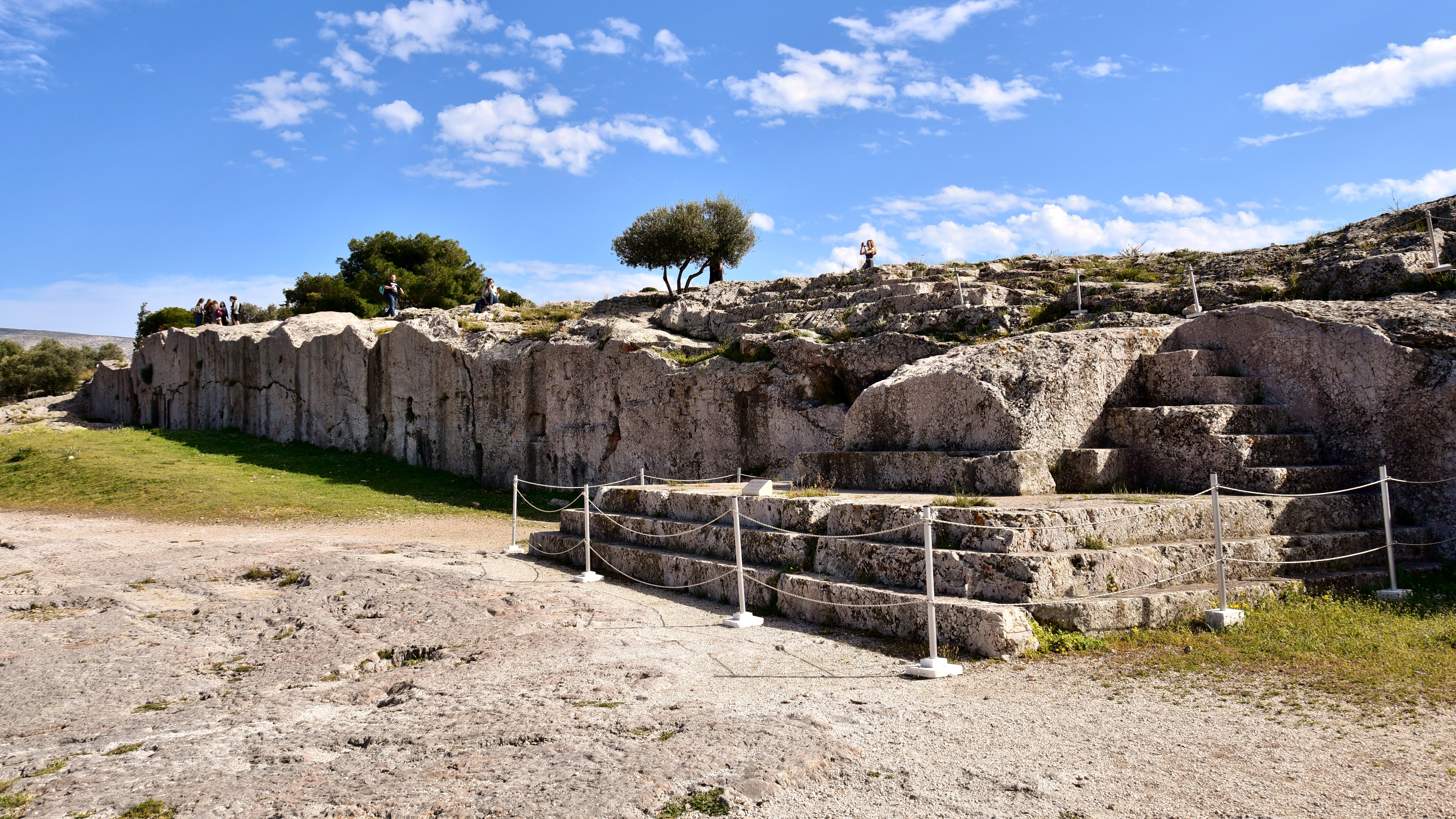
The remains of the bema, or speaker's platform, at the Pnyx in Athens

The Ancient Greek bēma (βῆμα) means both 'platform' and 'step', being derived from bainein (βαίνειν, 'to go'). The original use of the bema in Athens was as a tribunal from which orators addressed the citizens as well as the courts of law, for instance, in the Pnyx. In Greek law courts the two parties to a dispute presented their arguments each from separate bemas.

== Judaism ==
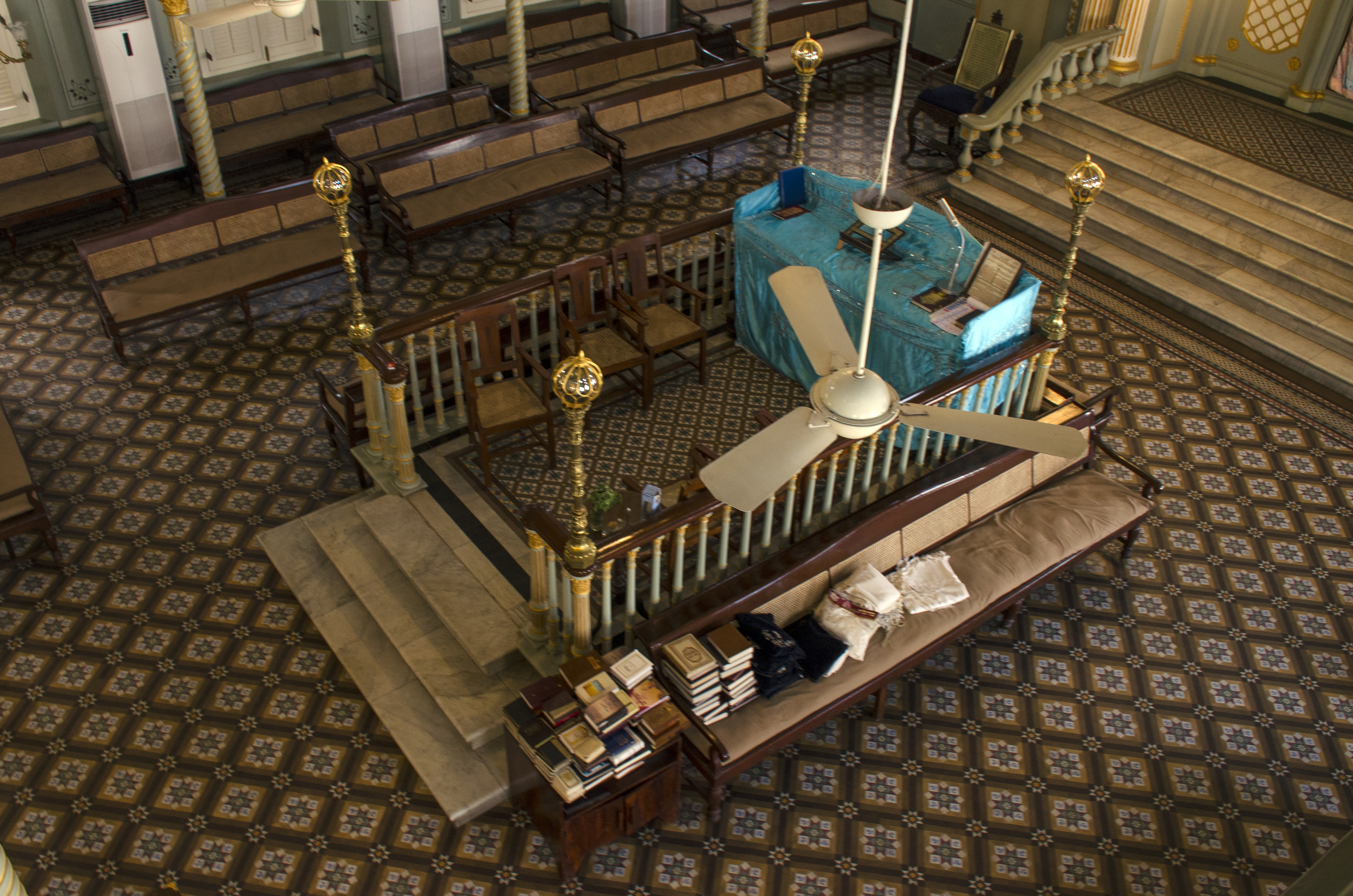
Bimah of Knesset Eliyahoo Synagogue, Mumbai, India

In Judaism, synagogues contain a bimah (Hebrew: בּימה, platform or pulpit), a large, raised, reader's platform, where the Torah scroll is placed to be read.

The bimah is raised to demonstrate the importance of the Torah reader, and to make it easier to hear the recitation of the Torah. Over time, it became a standard fixture in synagogues, where the weekly Torah portion and haftara are read. In Orthodox Judaism, the bimah is located in the center of the synagogue, separate from the Torah ark. In other branches of Judaism, the bimah and the ark are joined together.

== Maronite Christianity ==
The bema was traditionally used in the Maronite Church, in contrast to the Greek Orthodox and Syriac Orthodox churches, which prohibited it. Its presence exists in the former Maronite patriarchal seats of Yanouh and Mayfouq in Lebanon along with 46 other churches across Syria.

The Maronite Patriarch Estephan El Douaihy wrote about the bema in the Maronite Church saying:

The bema in the nave, in some churches is built at the end of the church, in others in the middle, in others north of the rail, for the reading of the epistles and Gospels as well as for sermons, the processions of the martyrs and similar celebrations...According to a tradition going back to the disciples of our father Saint Maroun, the prayers are sung in two choirs in the nave of the church outside the chancel. The bishops are allowed to sit there...

Carrying on the practice where the Scriptures would be read from a raised platform in the middle of the synagogue, the Liturgy of the Word would be prayed around the bema. The non-baptized would then be dismissed and the clergy would go towards the altar with the priest(s) chanting: "I have entered Your house O Lord and I have bowed down at Your 'Bema', O King of Glory forgive all my sins."

Although the bema has faded from the Maronite tradition for the most part, its legacy remains on Holy Thursday, where the celebrant places their chair where the bema would be and presides from there.

== See also ==
- Ambon (liturgy)
- High place, raised place of worship
- Peak sanctuaries
- Templon
- Tribune (architecture)
