= Walther Judeich =

German ancient historian (1859–1942)

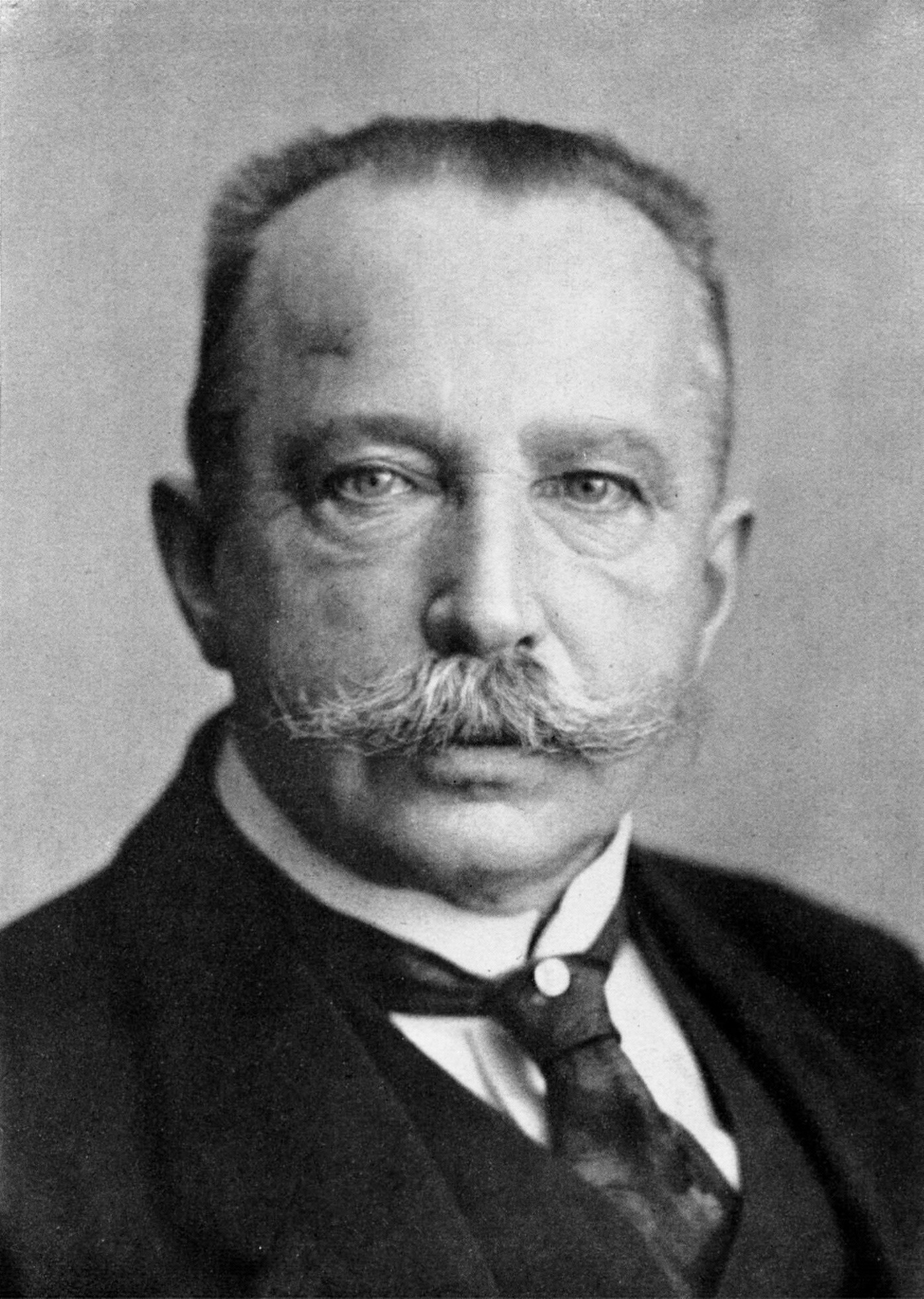
- Born: October 5, 1859; Dresden
- Died: February 24, 1942 (aged 82); Jena, Nazi Germany
- Education: University of Tübingen, University of Leipzig, University of Strasbourg
- Known for: Topography of Athens
- Scientific career
- Fields: Ancient History

Walther Judeich (5 October 1859, Dresden – 24 February 1942, Jena) was a German ancient historian. His grandfather on his mother's side was publisher Heinrich Brockhaus (1804–1874).

He studied history at the Universities of Tübingen, Leipzig and Strasbourg. From 1886 to 1888 he took part in archaeological excavations in Greece and Asia Minor, followed by research in Rome, Pompeii and Sicily (1888–89). Later on, he taught classes at the Universities of Marburg, Czernowitz and Erlangen. From 1907 to 1931 he was a professor of ancient history at the University of Jena. His successor at Jena was Fritz Schachermeyr.

In 1905 he published his magnum opus, "Topographie von Athen" (Topography of Athens), a scientific guide to historical landmarks of Athens that has been issued in 31 editions up to the year 2012.

== Published works ==
- Caesar im Orient : kritische Übersicht der Ergebnisse vom. 9. Aug. 48 bis Oct. 47, (1885) – Caesar in the East, Critical overview of the events of 9 August 48 to October 47.
- Kleinasiatische studien. Untersuchungen zur Griechisch-Persischen Geschichte des IV. jahrhunderts, (1892) – Asia Minor studies. Investigations of Greco-Persian history in the fourth century BC.
- Altertümer von Hierapolis, (1898; with Carl Humann, Franz Winter, Conrad Cichorius) – Antiquities of Hierapolis.
- Topographie von Athen, (1905) – Topography of Athens.
