= Pnyx =

Hill in Athens, Greece

- Πνύξ (Ancient Greek)
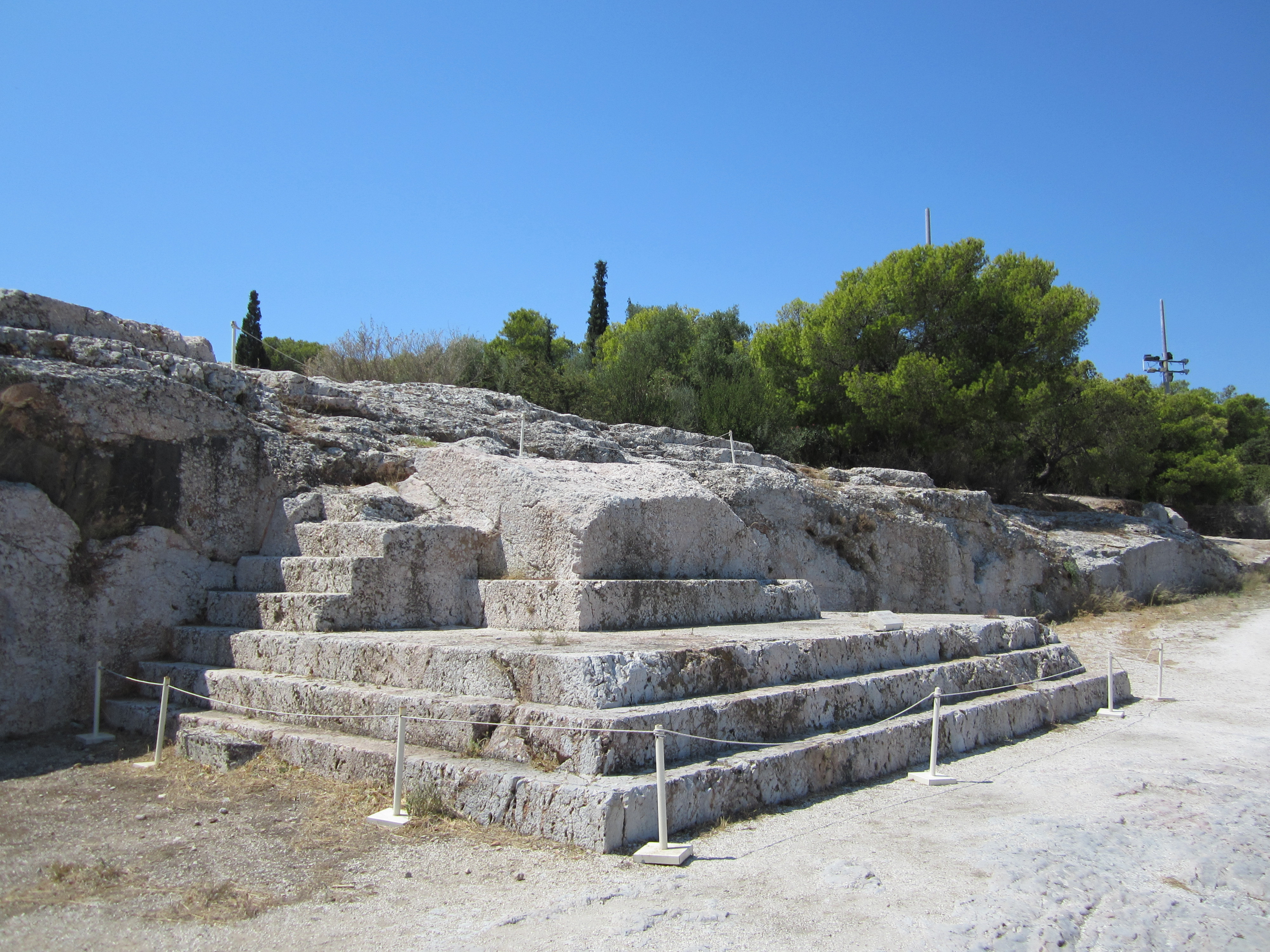
- Pnyx speaker's platform

- Location of the Pnyx on a map of Athens
- 37.971667°N 23.719444°E
- Periods: Fifth-century Athens
- Cultures: Ancient Greece
- Location: Athens, Greece
- Region: Attica

History
- Built: 507 BC

Site notes
- Condition: Ruined
- Owner: Public property
- Management: Ministry of Culture
- Public access: Yes

The Pnyx (/nɪks, pəˈnɪks/; Ancient Greek: Πνύξ [pnýks]; Greek: Πνύκα, Pnyka) is a hill or hillside in central Athens, the capital of Greece. Beginning as early as 507 BC (Fifth-century Athens), the Athenians gathered on the Pnyx to host their popular assemblies, making the hill one of the earliest and most important sites in the creation of democracy.

The Pnyx is located less than 1 kilometre (0.62 mi) west of the Acropolis and about 2 km south-west of the Syntagma Square in the centre of Athens. The "mainly natural hollow" was first used from before 500 BC to perhaps 404 BC, when the arrangement was changed by adding a retaining wall below the speakers' platform, with the space between filled with earth.

The Pnyx was probably the prototype for the Greek theatre auditorium, with the late form perhaps reflecting changes in theatre design.

== Historical significance ==
The Pnyx was used for popular assemblies in Athens as early as 507 BC, when the reforms of Cleisthenes transferred political power to the citizenry. It was then outside the city proper, but close enough to be convenient. It looks down on the ancient Agora, which was the commercial and social centre of the city.

At this site all the great political struggles of Athens of the "Golden Age" were fought out. Pericles, Aristides and Alcibiades spoke here, within sight of the Parthenon, temple of Athena. Here Demosthenes delivered his vilifications of Philip II of Macedon.

== The area ==
The Pnyx is a small, rocky hill surrounded by parkland, with a large flat platform of eroded stone set into its side, and by steps carved on its slope. It was the meeting place of one of the world's earliest known democratic legislatures, the Athenian ekklesia (assembly), and the flat stone platform was the bema, the "stepping stone" or speakers' platform. This was the oratorical platform from which noted politicians such as Pericles and orators "fulmined over Greece."

Some scholars note that the environs and position of the Pnyx as well as its openness and objects of appeal, provided the ancient Greek speakers with the inspiration that not even the Roman Forum could rival. It is described as a result of previous reforms that included the utilization of demography and topography for the purpose of serving the interests of a rhetorical culture.

As such, the Pnyx is the material embodiment of the principle of isēgoría (Greek: ἰσηγορία), "equal speech", i.e. the equal right of every citizen to debate matters of policy. The other two principles of democracy were isonomía (Greek: ἰσονομία), equality under the law, and isopoliteía (Greek: ἰσοπολιτεία), equality of vote and equal opportunity to assume political office. The right of isēgoría was expressed by the presiding officer of the Pnyx assembly, who formally opened each debate with the open invitation "Tís agoreúein boúletai?" (Greek: Τίς ἀγορεύειν βούλεται, "Who wishes to speak to the Popular Assembly?").

The Pnyx was protected by a defense wall built in the fourth century BC and reconstructed a century later. The new walls, made of almost solid masonry and ashlar blocks, were two-meter thick. The stretch began on a northern end with a tower that stood south of the Melitides Gate of the Themistoclean Wall and ended at the western end of the summit where it joined the Diateichisma. The wall featured seven towers set with 40-meter interval while the connecting walls were strengthened by buttresses.

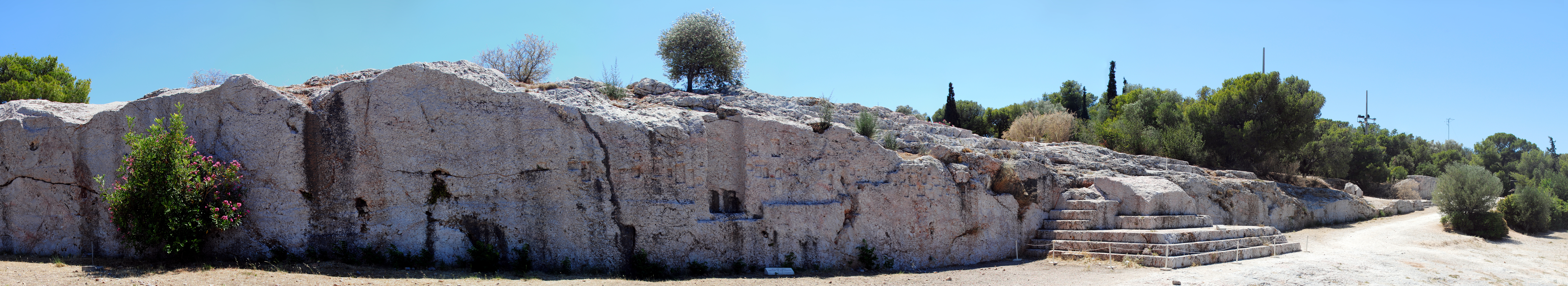
A panorama of the Pnyx

== Early history and phases ==
The Pnyx was the official meeting place of the Athenian democratic assembly (Ancient Greek: ἐκκλησία, ekklesía). In the earliest days of Athenian democracy, after the reforms of Kleisthenes in 508 B.C., the ekklesia met in the Agora. Sometime in the early 5th century, the meeting place was moved to a hill south and west of the Acropolis. This new meeting place came to be called "Pnyx", from the Greek word meaning "tightly packed together".

In the early history of the Pnyx, three phases can be distinguished:

Pnyx I: Probably constructed in the early 5th century B.C.. The people apparently sat on the hillside facing a speaker's platform on the north. The seating capacity may have been anywhere from 6,000 to 13,000 people. This phase is represented archaeologically only by a few cuttings in the bedrock and a boundary stone, not found in situ, so that it is impossible to determine the date and size with any precision.

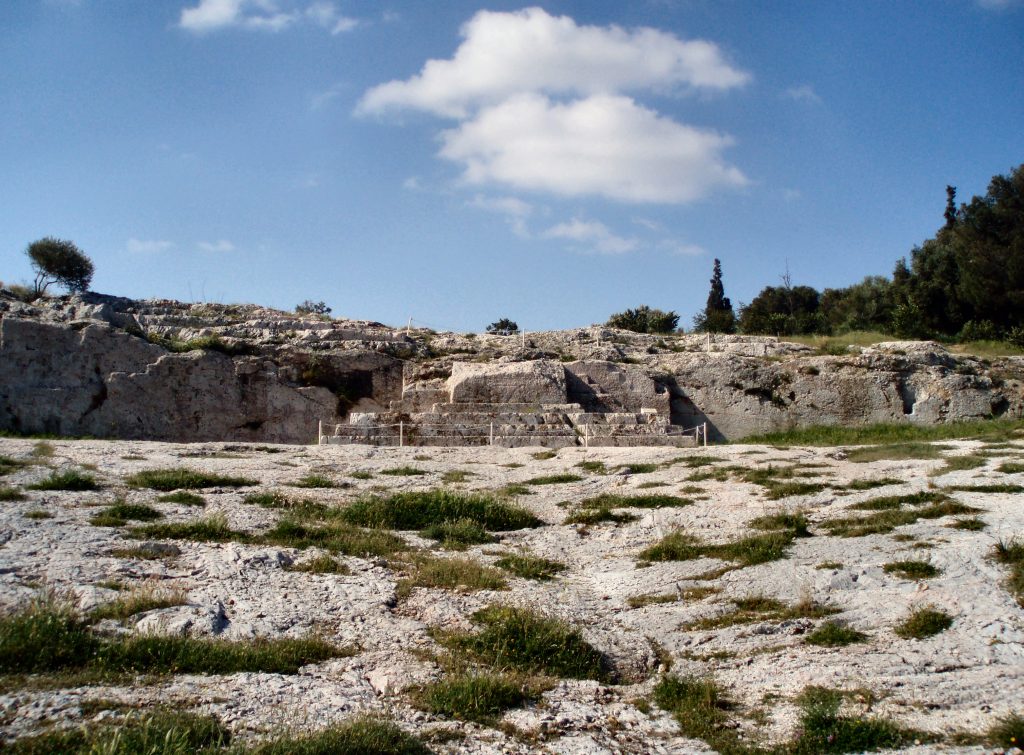
The Pnyx with the carved steps of the speaker's platform in the centre

Pnyx II: Probably late 5th century B.C. In this phase the orientation of the auditorium was apparently reversed, a reconstruction that is based more upon ancient literary sources than from the actual archaeological record. A stepped terrace wall was created on the north to support an artificial terrace. The people sat facing a speaker's platform on the south. Some sources stated that this retaining wall was constructed around 500 BC for the purpose of holding the soil that was brought in to form the level space for the bema. Part of the stepped terrace wall is preserved, as well as a staircase with rock-cut steps leading up to it from the direction of the Agora. The size of the auditorium, as it is restored by the excavators, is not that much larger than Pnyx I.

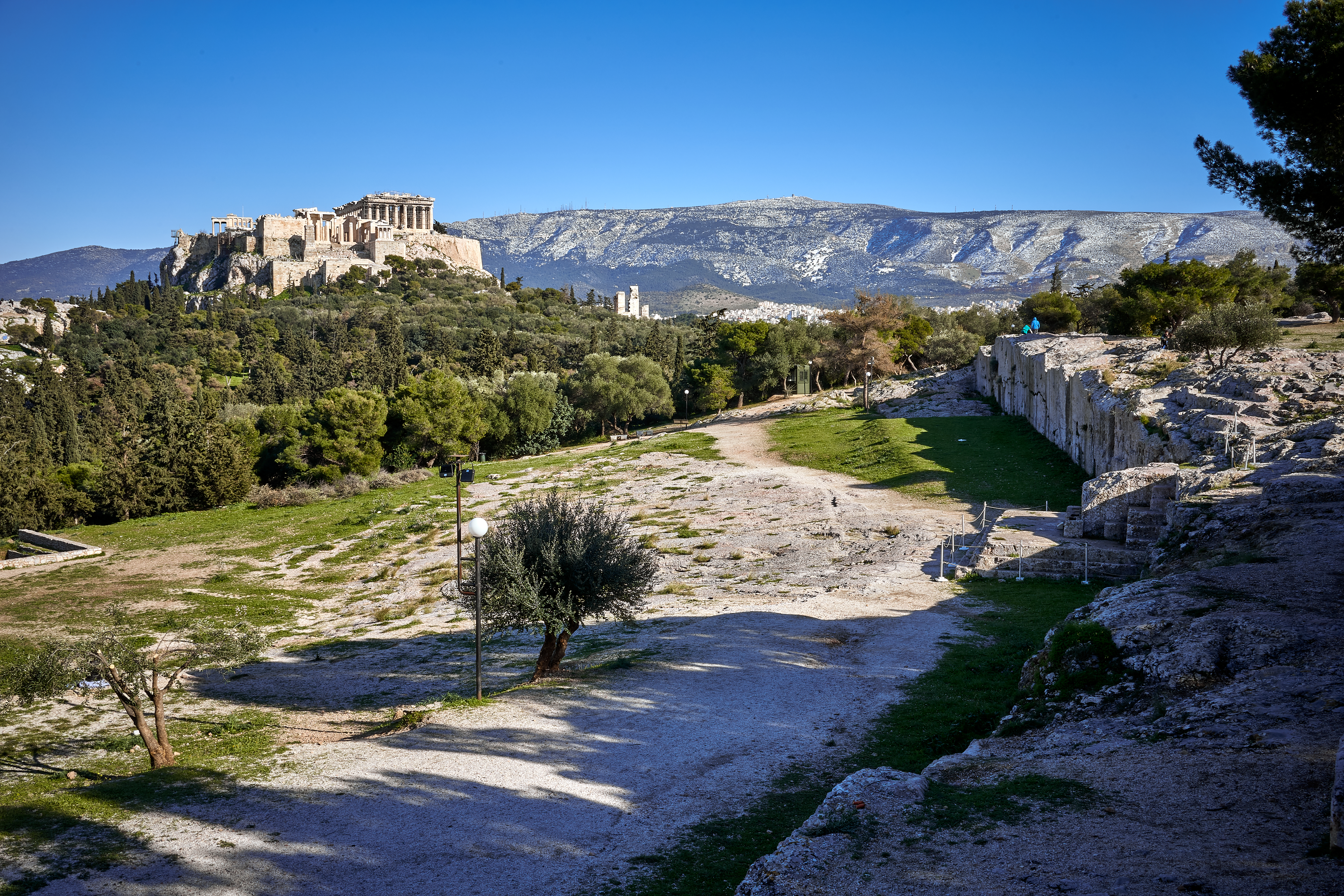
Pnyx foreground, speaker's platform right, Acropolis background.

Pnyx III: The Pnyx was rebuilt and expanded in the 3rd quarter of the 4th century B.C., probably around 345-335 B.C. A massive, curved, retaining wall was built, or at least begun, on the north. The southern side of the auditorium and speaker's platform (bema) were quarried out of the natural bedrock. Traces of the quarrying process can be seen at the eastern side of the great rock-cut scarp. On a terrace above, south of the speaker's platform, the foundations were begun for 2 long stoas, but these seem never to have been finished. It is unknown for how many years Pnyx III was used as the meeting place of the ekklesia. Certainly by the 1st century B.C. the assembly held their meetings in the Theater of Dionysos, on the South Slope of the Acropolis.

In the Roman period, part of the Pnyx was used as a sanctuary of Zeus Hypsistos. Evidence for the sanctuary consist of c. 50 niches for votive plaques cut into the bedrock scarp east of the speaker's platform, accompanied by short inscriptions dedicated to Theos Hypsistos. Many of the votive plaques are carved with representations of human body parts (eyes, breasts, etc.), suggesting that this Zeus Hypsistos was a healing divinity. The site lacks any anthropomorphic representations, indicating an aniconic mode of worship. The installation appears informal, with no clear evidence of an organized priesthood. The dedicants include a substantial number of women and individuals of modest social status.

== Athenian democracy ==
Scholars such as Mogens Herman Hansen suggest the Pnyx was able to hold about 6,000 citizens, though later expansions may have accommodated 8,000 or as many as 13,000. French classical scholar Robert Flacelière states that the Pnyx had enough standing room for as many as 20,000 citizens, though this is disputed. The grassy area in front of the bema was in ancient times an area of bare rock, on which about 6,000 men could stand.

This can be taken as a reasonable estimate of the number of politically active citizens. Citizens were free males born in the city, or perhaps 20% of the adult population. There were wooden seats for the members of the Council of 500, who were selected by lot for terms of a single year to run the city on a day-to-day basis, and prepare the agenda for the Assembly. In later times two stoae, or covered galleries, were built to protect the dignitaries against the rain and sun.

In theory, all citizens were equal and all of the male citizens had the right to speak. In practice, relatively few citizens actually spoke or proposed actions. A citizen who made a proposal might be subjected to a future prosecution (graphe paranomon) if the proposal was illegal or came to be seen as detrimental to Athens. There was a rule that citizens aged over 50 had a right to be heard first.

Democratic government at Athens was suspended in 411 BC and again in 404 BC with the assumption of power by oligarchies during crises in the Peloponnesian War. The Spartans and their allies in Athens installed a dictatorship, called the Thirty Tyrants. In 403 BC, the democrats seized power again and the meetings at the Pnyx resumed. Athens lost its independence to Philip II of Macedon after the battle of Chaeronea in 338 BC. They continued to run their internal affairs democratically until the coup by Demetrius of Phaleron in 322 BC. After his fall, the Athenians continued to run their internal affairs according to democratic forms for centuries.

== Excavations ==
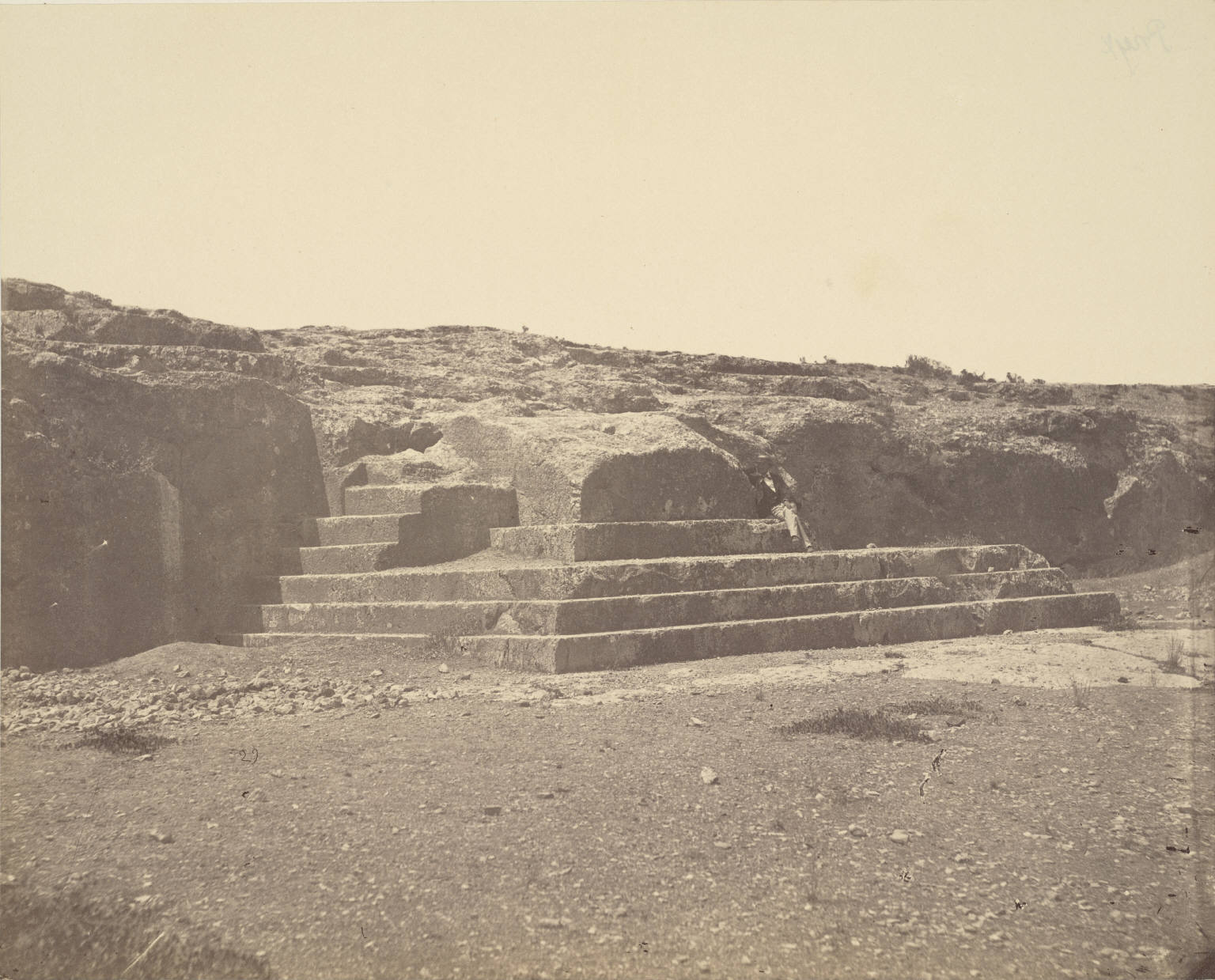
An albumen print of the carved speaker's staircase of the Pnyx, taken circa 1865–1895, looking west.

In 1910, excavations began at the site by the Greek Archaeological Society and confirmed the site as the Pnyx. Large-scale excavations were conducted at times between 1930 and 1937 by Homer Thompson, in collaboration first with K. Kourouniotes and later with Robert Scranton.

These excavations discovered the foundations of the important buildings at the Pnyx, although nothing else remains of them. These included the two large stoas, erected between 330 and 326 BC, the Altar of Zeus Agoraios, erected at the same time, but removed during the reign of Augustus (first century BC), and the Sanctuary of Zeus Hypsistos. Most of these buildings were erected after the Pnyx had lost its real significance.

West to the Altar of Zeus are the foundations of Meton's heliotropion, the oldest known astronomical observatory. There he performed several of his measurements that led to the calculations involving the eponymous 19-year Metonic cycle, which he introduced in 432 BC into the lunisolar Attic calendar, a calendar that appears in the Antikythera Mechanism.

Today the site of the Pnyx is under the control of the Ephorate of Prehistorical and Classical Antiquities of the Greek Ministry of Culture. The surrounding parkland is fenced, but can be visited free of charge at any time.
