= Sack of Athens (267 AD) =

267 sack of Athens by the Heruli, a Germanic tribe

The sack of Athens in 267 AD was carried out by the Heruli, a Germanic tribe that had invaded the Balkans at the time. Despite the recent fortification of Athens with a new city wall, the Heruli succeeded in capturing the city and laid much of it to waste, before they were driven out by the Athenians under the leadership of the historian Dexippus. The event left lasting damage to the city's monuments and stoas, and Athens lost its ancient glory and eminence, shrinking to the area around the Roman Agora, which was enclosed with a new wall.

== Sources ==
- Chioti, Lambrini (2018). Η επιδρομή των Ερούλων στην Αθήνα (267 μ.Χ.): συμβολή στη μελέτη των επιπτώσεων της επιδρομής και της ανασυγκρότησης της πόλης έως τα τέλη του 4ου αιώνα [The Herulian invasion in Athens (267 A.D.): contribution to the study of the invasion’s implications and the city’s reconstitution until the end of the 4th century] (PhD thesis) (in Greek). National and Kapodistrian University of Athens, Philosophical Faculty, History and Archaeology Department. hdl:10442/hedi/44214.
- Moschonas, Nikos (1996). "Η τοπογραφία της Αθήνας στη βυζαντινή και μεταβυζαντινή εποχή" [The topography of Athens during the Byzantine and post-Byzantine period]. In Grammatikopoulou, Eleni (ed.). Αρχαιολογία της πόλης των Αθηνών: Επιστημονικές-επιμορφωτικές διαλέξεις [Archaeology of the City of Athens: Scientific-educational lectures] (in Greek). Athens: National Research Foundation. pp. 137–156. ISBN 978-9-6070-9457-5.
