= Conrad Cichorius =

German historian and classical philologist (1863–1932)

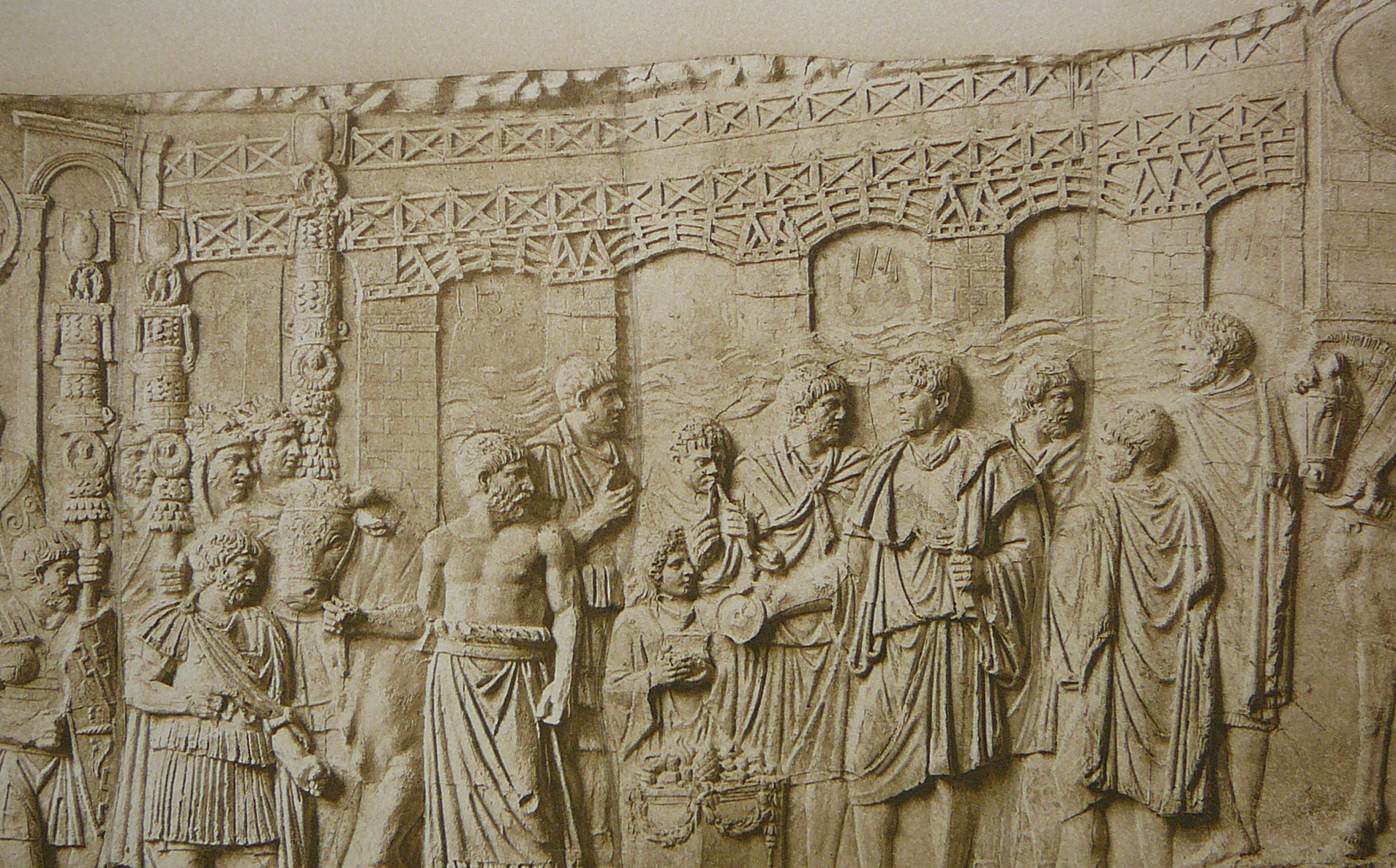
Relief of Trajan's Column, published by Cichorius

Conrad Cichorius (25 May 1863, Leipzig – 20 January 1932, Bonn) was a German historian and classical philologist. He is known for publishing a complete survey of the reliefs of Trajan's Column, which still forms the basis of modern scholarship.

From 1882 to 1886 he studied at the universities of Freiburg, Leipzig and Berlin, and in 1895 became an associate professor at Leipzig. Later on, he was a full professor of ancient history at the universities of Breslau (1900–16) and Bonn (1916–28). In 1923/24 he served as university rector. His doctoral students included Vasile Pârvan.

== Selected works ==
- Rom und Mytilene, Teubner, Leipzig 1888
- Die Reliefs der Traianssäule. Erster Tafelband: "Die Reliefs des Ersten Dakischen Krieges", Tafeln 1-57, Berlin: Verlag von Georg Reimer, 1896
- Die Reliefs der Traianssäule. Zweiter Tafelband: "Die Reliefs des Zweiten Dakischen Krieges", Tafeln 58-113, Berlin: Verlag von Georg Reimer, 1900
- Die Reliefs des Denkmals von Adamklissi, Leipzig 1897
- Untersuchungen zu Lucilius, Berlin 1908
- Römische Studien. Historisches, Epigraphisches, Literaturgeschichtliches aus vier Jahrhunderten Roms, Leipzig/Berlin 1922
