= List of keepers and curators of the Yorkshire Museum =

The keepers, curators, and honorary curators of the Yorkshire Museum are responsible for curation of the museum's collection.

== History of the role ==
The keepers are professional curators and related academics. When the museum was founded there was one Keeper of the museum supported by the Sub-Curator and various Honorary Curators. The last Keeper of the Museum was George Willmot in 1970, after which time each department in the museum had its own keeper and the museum was run by one curator. Since the founding of York Museums Trust in 2002, each department has been led by a curator and there is no longer a role of keeper.

Keepers and Curators of the Yorkshire Museum
Name	Title	Dates in Post	Image	References
John Phillips	Keeper of the museum	1826–1844		
Henry Baines	Sub-Curator	1829–1870		
William Hincks	Curator of Botany	1827–1838		
Charles Wellbeloved	Honorary Curator of Antiquities	1823–1858		
Thomas Allis	Honorary Curator of Ornithology; Honorary Curator of Comparative Anatomy	1835–1839; 1839–1875		
Edward Charlesworth	Keeper of the museum	1844–1858		
William Hey	Honorary Curator of Insects and Crustacea	1850-1882		
John Kenrick	Honorary Curator of Library and Manuscripts; Honorary Curator of Antiquities	1850-1856; 1856-1878		
William Dallas	Keeper of the museum	1858–1868		
Charles Wakefield	Keeper of the museum, Honorary Curator of Numismatics	1870–1878		
Rev Canon James Raine	Honorary Curator of Antiquities	1873–1896		
Wilfred Hudleston Hudleston	Honorary Curator of Mineralogy	1877-1907		
John-Clay Purves	Keeper of the museum	1878–1880		
Walter Keeping	Keeper of the museum	1880–1883		
Henry Maurice Platnauer	Keeper of the museum	1883–1904		
Oxley Grabham	Keeper of the museum	1904–1919		
George Benson	Honorary Curator of Archaeology; Honorary Curator of Numismatics	1918-1924		
Thomas Boynton	Honorary Curator of Antiquities	d.1919		
Walter Harvey Brook	Honorary Curator of Medieval Architecture	Early 20th Century		
William Herbert St Quintin	Honorary Curator of Zoology	1922–1931		
Walter Edward Collinge	Keeper of the museum	1921–1940		
Reginald Wagstaffe	Keeper of the museum	1940–1950		
Mary Kitson Clark	Honorary Curator of Roman Antiquities	1941–1943		
Walter Douglas Hincks	Honorary Curator of Entomology (excluding lepidoptera)	1942–1947		
George Willmot	Keeper of the museum	1950–1970		
Colin Simms	Keeper of Biology	1964–1982		
Barbara Pyrah	Keeper of Geology	1968–1988		
Allen Butterworth	Keeper	1970–1974		
Elizabeth Hartley	Keeper of Archaeology	1971–2007		
Michael Clegg	Curator	1974–1982		
Paul Howard	Keeper of Biology	1980s–1990s		
Terence Suthers	Curator, Director	1983–1987		
Janetta Lambert	Keeper of Biology	c.1984		
Melinda Mays	Numismatist	1984–?		
Brian Hayton	Curator (latterly County Museums Officer)	1987–?		
Martin Lunn	Honorary Curator of Astronomy; Assistant Curator of Astronomy and Scientific Instruments (after 2002)	1989-2011		
Paul Ensom	Keeper of Geology	1989-1997		
Andrew Morrison	Curator of Archaeology; Head of Collections	2006–2014		
Camilla Nichol	Curator of Geology	Around 2007		
Isla Gladstone	Curator of Natural Sciences	2009–2013		
Natalie Buy	Curator of Archaeology	2014–2017		
Andrew Woods	Curator of Numismatics; Senior Curator	2013–2017 (as Curator of Numismatics); 2017–present (as Senior Curator)		
