= George Willmot =

British archaeologist and curator

George Francis Willmot
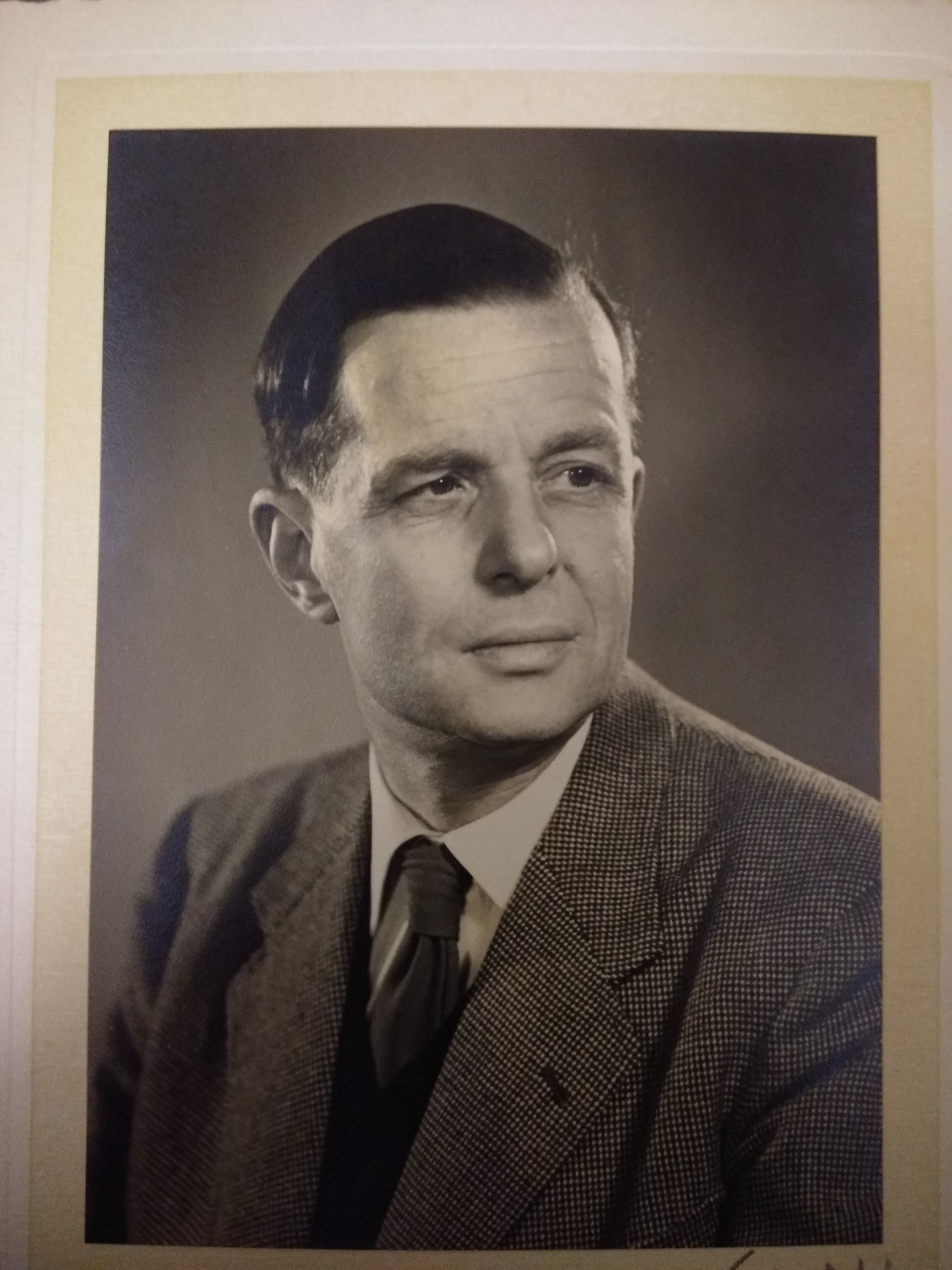
- Born: 1908
- Died: 14 February 1977 (aged 68–69)
- Occupations: Archaeologist and Curator

George Francis Willmot BA FSA (1908–1977) was a British archaeologist and curator based in York

== Early life ==
George Willmot was the son of a solicitor from Bournemouth. He undertook archaeological fieldwork from an early age, as at age 19 he discovered an Anglo-Saxon cemetery site at Abington, Berkshire. He attended Oxford University before teaching in Bedford and, later, Ampleforth before the War.

== World War II ==
At the end of the Second World War, Willmot served with the rank of Major with the Monuments, Fine Arts, and Archives program (MFAA) as one of the so-called 'Monuments Men'. He was responsible for MFAA activities in Hamburg, Germany, and worked on various projects including St. Catherine's Church and St. Michael's Church. Throughout 1946 and 1947 he remained in Europe with the MFAA, working first in Düsseldorf and then in Hanover.

== Keeper of the Yorkshire Museum ==
From May 1950, Willmot was employed by the Yorkshire Philosophical Society as Keeper of the Yorkshire Museum; a position he held until his retirement through ill-health in 1970. He worked on various aspects of the collection, including the redisplay of the Bird Gallery in 1951 and the Roman Gallery in 1958 (after a £350 grant from the Carnegie Trust, and opened by Sir Ian Richmond), and research and improved storage of the important Geological 'type and figured' specimens.

He was elected a Fellow of the Society of Antiquaries of London on 3 May 1951.

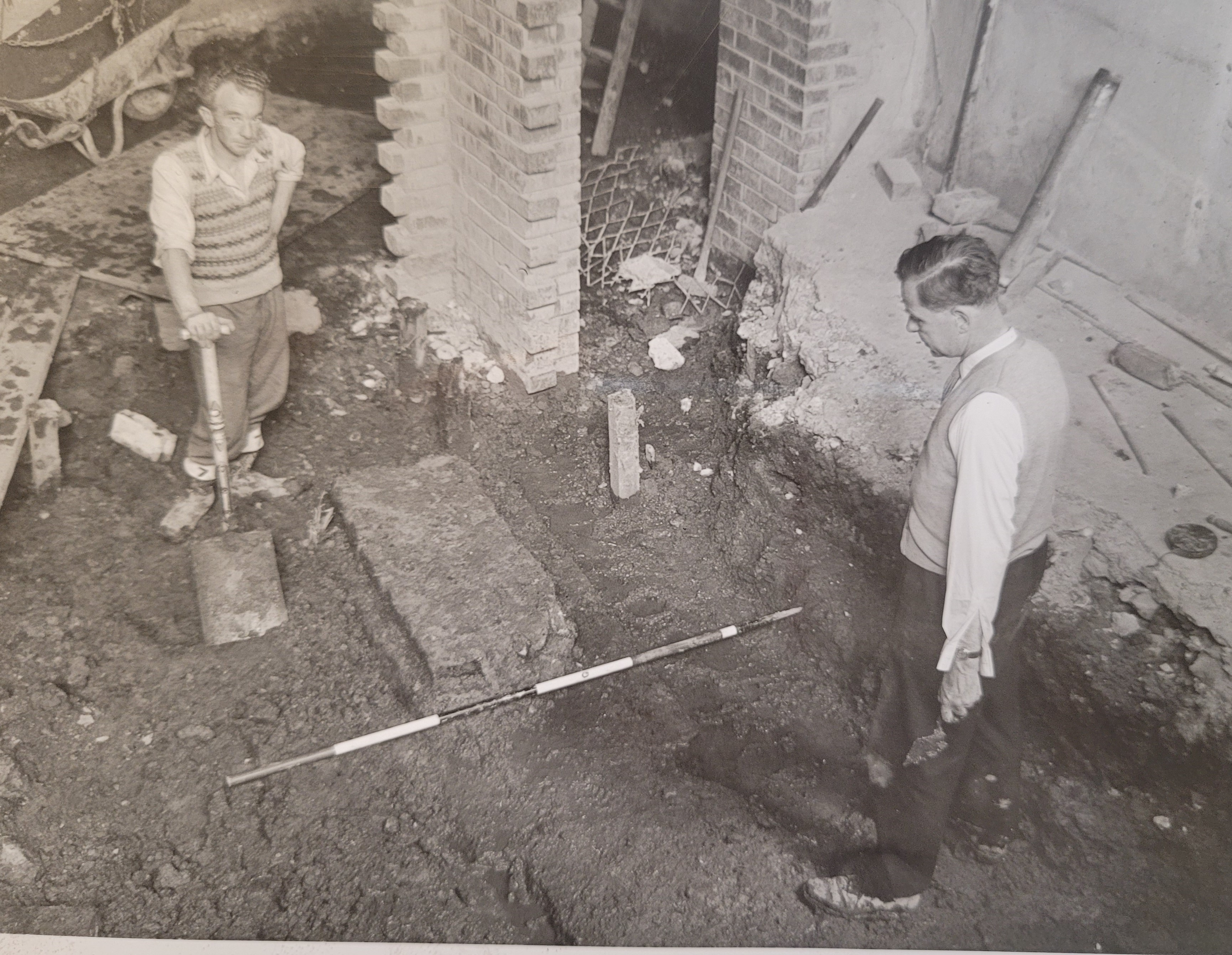
George F Willmot excavating at Davygate in 1958

== Excavation and research ==
Academically, Willmot undertook important and pioneering work on Bronze Age beakers that was never fully published as well as directing numerous excavations of prehistoric sites in Britain and Ireland. In 1963, Willmot excavated All Saints' Church (High Ousegate, York).

Between 1952 and 1956, Willmot undertook a series of excavations in the western part of St. Mary's Abbey, continuing previous excavation on the site by Charles Wellbeloved and Walter Harvey Brook. The results of these excavations were also never formally published and exist only as unpublished notes and short reviews. The excavations in the abbey utilised volunteer excavators drawn from the members of the Yorkshire Philosophical Society and students of Bootham School and extended beneath the abbey to include Pre-Norman and Roman levels.

Ian Stead dedicated his 1979 book The Arras Culture to George Willmot. The dedication reads: "To the memory of George Francis Willmost, lately Keeper of the Yorkshire Museum, who pursued original research throughout Europe and encouraged many an aspiring archaeologist, this book is gratefully dedicated".

== See also ==
- St. Mary's Abbey
- Yorkshire Museum
- Yorkshire Philosophical Society
- York Museum Gardens
- History of York
- Elizabeth Hartley – Keeper of Archaeology at the Yorkshire Museum (1971–2007)
