= George Benson (architect) =

George Benson (17 November 1856 – 23 October 1935) was a British architect and antiquarian.

== Biography ==
Born in Liverpool in 1856, Benson's moved to York in his early years where his father (George Benson, b.1815) was an innkeeper on Blossom Street.

Benson worked as an architect and was an Associate of the Royal Institute of British Architects for thirty years between 1898 and 1928.

Benson was a member of the Yorkshire Archaeological and Historical Society and served on its Roman Antiquities and Ancient Monuments Committees. He was an active member of the Yorkshire Architectural and York Archaeological Society and worked with William Arthur Evelyn, Edwin Ridsdale Tate, Canon Solloway and TP Cooper to "revive the activities of the Society". He was the honorary archivist at St Martin-cum-Gregory, Micklegate where he was a worshipper. Benson was elected as a member of the Yorkshire Philosophical Society in 1892 and subsequently served on its council. Through the YPS he was an Honorary Curator at the Yorkshire Museum from 1918 to 1924, first of Archaeology and then of Numismatics.

Benson was a prolific writer of architectural, archaeological, and antiquarian books and papers on subjects relating to York. His first pamphlets were issued in 1885 on The bells and customs of the ancient churches of York and A Brief Historical Sketch of the Drama in York. He had a particular interest in the ecclesiastical buildings of the city and was a recognised expert on York Minster and the decorated window glass in churches throughout York. His most prominent work was a history of the city of York published in three volumes: York from its Origin to the End of the Eleventh Century (1911), Later Medieval York: The City and County of the City of York, from 1100 to 1603 (1919), and An Account of the City and County of the City of York from the Reformation to the year 1925 (1925). This series was reprinted as a single volume in 1966 and reported in the York Press as the "greatest compliment which can be paid to a writer's art".

He is buried in the churchyard of St Stephen's Church, Acomb.

== Select publications ==
- Benson, G. 1885. The Bells of the Ancient Churches of York.
- Benson, G. 1892. "St Mary’s Abbey, York, and the History, Traditions and Curious Customs of York Minster", in Andrews, W. Bygone Yorkshire.
- Benson, G. 1902. "Hospital of St Peter, York". Yorkshire Philosophical Society Annual Report 1901, 98–103.
- Benson, G. 1906. "The Minster and Church of York", in Historical and Scientific Survey of York and District (75th Meeting of the British Association at York)
- Benson, G. 1910. "Holy Trinity Church, Goodramgate, York: Extracts from the churchwardens accounts, 1557-1819". Associated Architectural Societies Reports And Papers 30, 641-654
- Benson, G. 1911. York from its Origin to the End of the Eleventh Century.
- Benson, G. 1913. "Coins: especially those relating to York". Yorkshire Philosophical Society Annual Report 1912.
- Benson, G. 1919. Later Medieval York: The City and County of the City of York, from 1100 to 1603.
- Benson, G. 1917. "John Browne, 1793-1877, artist and the historian of York minster." Yorkshire Philosophical Society Annual Report 1916.
- Benson, G. 1925. An Account of the City and County of the City of York from the Reformation to the year 1925.
- Benson, G. 1929. "The Cathedral Church of St. Peter, and, The Churches of York", in Handbook of the Conference of the RIBA.

1. Benson produced at least 47 papers, pamphlets, and books between 1885 and 1931.
