= Walter Keeping =

British geologist (1854–1888)

- Born: 6 January 1854
- Died: 22 February 1888 (aged 34)
- Occupations: Geologist and Curator

Walter Keeping MA FGS (1854–1888) was a British geologist and museum curator.

== Biography ==
Keeping was a master's degree graduate of Christ's College, Cambridge and worked with his father, Henry Keeping, in the Sedgwick Museum. He left the Sedgwick Museum in to take up the Chair of Natural Science in the University College of Wales at Aberystwyth and was subsequently appointed Keeper of the Yorkshire Museum in August 1880.

Upon his appointment to the role of Keeper, Keeping was paid £200 a year in wages. He had tried to negotiate a larger sum, but instead accepted the residence of St. Mary's Lodge in the Museum Gardens. Shortly after moving to York he developed a form of paralysis which affected his ability to work; he retired from the museum in 1883 as a result of his 'mental infirmity'.

== Publications ==
- Keeping, W. 1875. "The Occurrence of Neocomian Sands with Phosphatic Nodules at Brickhill", Geological Magazine 2(8). 372–375.
- Keeping, W. 1878. "On Pelanechinus, a new Genus of Sea-urchins from the Coral Rag", Quarterly Journal of the Geological Society of London 34. 924–930.
- Keeping, W. 1880. "The Included Pebbles of the Upper Neocomian Sands of the South East of England, especially those of the Upware and Potton Pebble-beds". Geological Magazine 7(9). 414–421.
- Keeping, W. 1881. "The Geology of Central Wales", Quarterly Journal of the Geological Society 37. 141–170.
- Keeping, W. 1882. "The Glacial Geology of Central Wales", Geological Magazine 9(6). 251–257.
- Keeping, W. 1883. "On Some New Railway Sections and other Rock Exposures in the District of Cave, Yorkshire", Geological Magazine 10(5). 215–221.
