= James Atkinson (surgeon) =

James Atkinson (1759–1839) was an English surgeon and bibliographer.

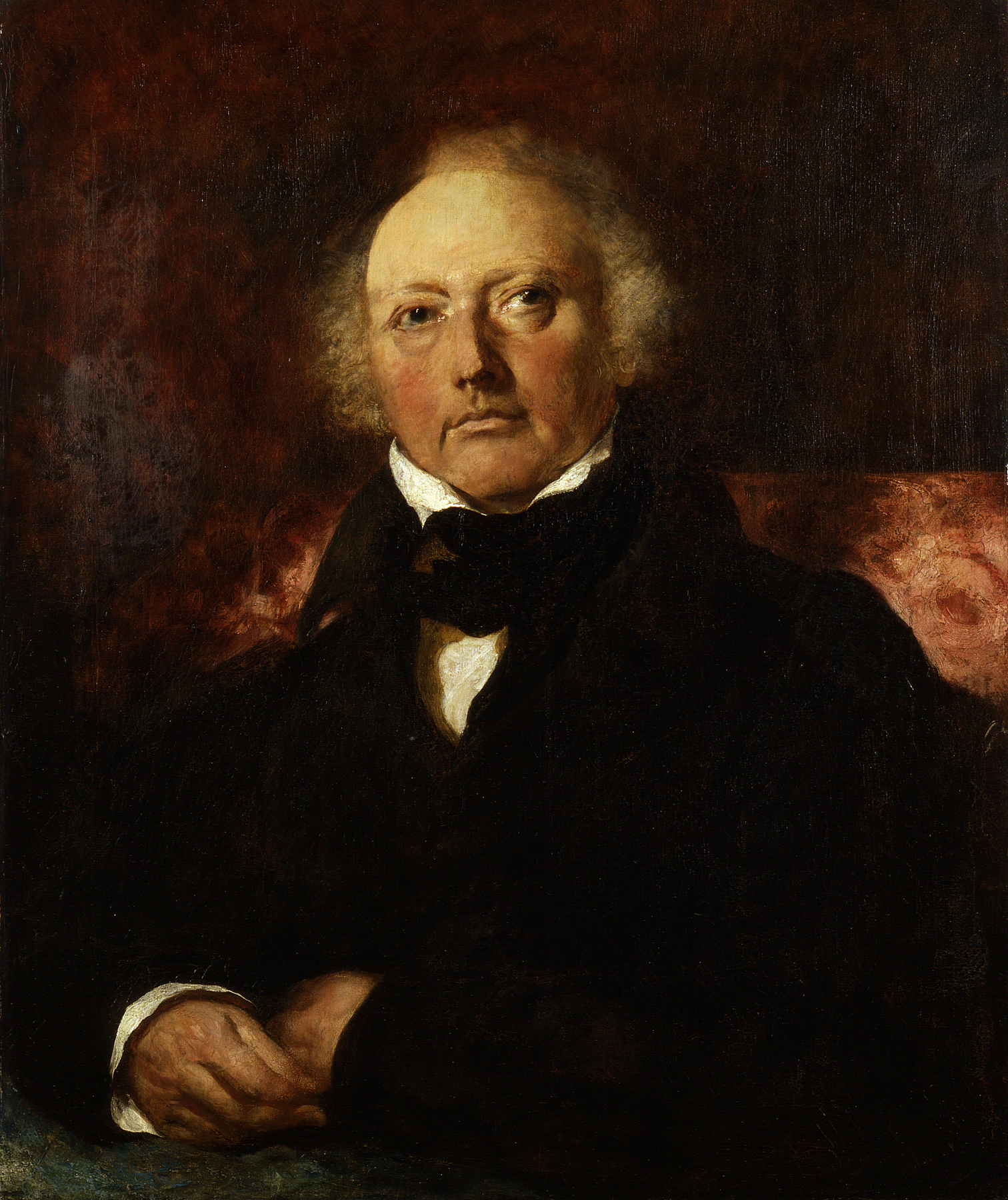
James Atkinson, 1832 portrait by William Etty

== Life ==
Atkinson was the son of a medical practitioner and friend of Laurence Sterne in York. He studied under Henry Cline and Thomas Denman. A Roman Catholic, he went into medical practice in York in 1782. He spent some time in continental travel.

For many years Atkinson was the chief medical man in York, and remained in practice to within a few years of his death, which took place at the age of 80 at Lendal, on 14 March 1839. He was buried at St Helen, Stonegate

== Sterne portrait ==
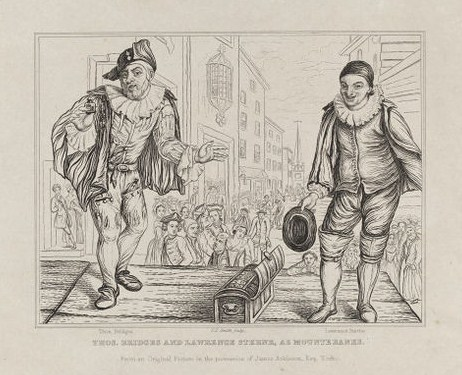
Bridges (left) and Sterne (right), double portrait, engraving after an original preserved in the Atkinson family

Laurence Sterne, vicar at Sutton-on-the-Forest some miles north of York, moved into the city in 1739, returning in 1742. The Atkinson family connection with Sterne led to the preservation of what is considered likely to be the earliest Sterne portrait, via an engraving by Charles John Smith.

An oil caricature of Sterne by Thomas Bridges, painted as a double portrait with a caricature of Bridges by Sterne, was owned by Atkinson. It is known that Sterne in his part of the composite work followed closely an engraving The Infallible Mountebank, or Quack Doctor, an old broadside satirising Hans Buling, after Marcellus Laroon. In 1761, before travelling to France, Sterne left behind details of the "lady" who was then owner of the oil portrait, with Elizabeth Montagu.

The original oil painting is not now known to be extant. Atkinson showed it to Thomas Frognall Dibdin, who was on tour; Dibdin had it engraved. The reproduced double portrait then appeared in 1838 in Bibliographical, Antiquarian, and Picturesque Tour in the North Counties of England and Scotland.

== Works ==
His major work was Medical Bibliography, A and B, London, 1834. It is full of anecdote, humour, and out-of-the-way information; but the bibliography consists of a dry list of editions arranged alphabetically under names of authors. There is nothing to show that it was the intention of Atkinson to go any further. On the title page Atkinson is described as "surgeon to H.R.H. the Duke of York, senior surgeon to the York County Hospital and the York Dispensary, and late V.P. to the Yorkshire Philosophical Society."

A medical work attributed to Atkinson by Henry Richard Tedder in the first edition of the Dictionary of National Biography, Description of the New Process of perforating and destroying the Stone in the Bladder, illustrated with Cases and a Drawing of the Instrument, in a Letter addressed to the Medical Board of Calcutta, London, 1831, was in fact by his namesake James Atkinson the orientalist.

A rare and eccentric humorous work, Obstetric Ejaculations on Cow Pock (apparently privately printed in 1808), is attributed to Atkinson in the catalogue of the library of Francis Wrangham.

== Family ==
Atkinson's youngest daughter, Mary, married General Sir James Charles Chatterton in 1825.

His brother was the doctor Charles Atkinson, who wrote the "rural poem" ‘Neighbourhood of Heslington’, dedicated to Henry Yarburgh of Heslington Hall.
