= William Herbert St Quintin =

British naturalist

William Herbert St Quintin DL JP FZS
- Born: c. 1851
- Died: 21 January 1933
- Education: Christ Church, Oxford
- Occupation: Naturalist

William Herbert St Quintin DL JP FZS (c. 1851–1933) was a British naturalist.

== Biography ==
St Quintin was educated at Eton College and Christ Church, Oxford. He was a Justice of the peace from 1875 until his death, and served as the High Sheriff of Yorkshire in 1899 and Deputy Lieutenant of the East Riding.

St Quintin was a keen ornithologist, keeping a private collection of birds including Great bustards, a secretary bird, and a tūī. He was a founding member of the Avicultural Society in 1895, president of the Yorkshire Naturalists' Union in 1909, a member of the British Ornithologists' Union from 1883 to 1922 and also served on the council of the Royal Society for the Protection of Birds from 1908–1919. St Qunitin was the President of the Yorkshire Philosophical Society from 1914 until his death in 1933, and also served as the Honorary Curator of Zoology.

== Personal life ==
In 1885 he married Violet Helen Duncombe and they had one daughter, Margery Violet St Quintin.

== Select publications ==
- St Quintin, W. H., 1905. "The breeding of Pterocles exustus". Avicultural Magazine (New Series) 3, pp. 64–66.
- St Quintin, W. H., 1907. "Leaf-insects in captivity". The Entomologist 40, pp. 73–75.
- St Quintin, W. H., 1908. "Notes on the life history of the leaf insects". Naturalist, 618, pp. 235–238.
- St Quintin, W. H., 1910. "Ants and Lycaenid Larvae", Entomologists' Record 22, pp. 72–73.

== See also ==
- Scampston Hall, the estate owned by the St Quintin family
- St Quintin baronets
