= Henry Maurice Platnauer =

Henry Maurice Platnauer FGS
- Born: 1857; London, UK
- Died: 1 October 1939 (aged 81–82)
- Occupations: Geologist; Mineralogist; Museum curator

Henry Maurice Platnauer FGS (1857 – 1 October 1939) was a British mineralogist and Museum Curator.

== Career ==
Platnauer was educated at the City of London School and at the London University. His academic interests lay in mineralogy and he worked with the Natural History collections of the British Museum for eight years before being appointed to the position of Keeper of the Yorkshire Museum in 1883, a role he held until 1904. Through this role he subsequently served as a Vice-President of the Yorkshire Philosophical Society from 1905 and was elected as an honorary member of the YPS in 1935.

Platnauer served as a Volunteer soldier in the Second Boer War and later served in the Territorial Army. During the First World War he served with the rank of Captain and was primarily involved with training units. He and his wife Mary Ann (nee Wilson) left York in 1912 to live in Bournemouth, where he stayed until her death in 1920, after which he returned to London. Their son, Maurice Platnauer, was a Vice-Principal of Brasenose College, Oxford.

=== Museums Association ===
Platnauer was one of the founding members of the Museums Association, which had its preliminary meeting in York in 1888 before its first official meeting the following year. Platnauer served as the joint secretary of the Association from 1889 to 1897 and co-edited the annual reports in 1890 to 1896. He eventually became its president, giving the presidential address to the annual meeting in 1911. He was also a Fellow of the Geological Society of London and a member of the Yorkshire Geological Society.

== Publications ==
- Platnauer, H. M. 1894. "List of Figured Specimens in York Museum", Annual Report of the Yorkshire Philosophical Society.
- Platnauer, H. M. 1894. Appendix to the list of figured specimens. York.
- Benson, G. and Platnauer, H. M. 1902. "Notes on Cliffords Tower" Annual Report of the Yorkshire Philosophical Society.
- Howarth, E. and Platnauer, H. M. 1911. Directory of Museums in Great Britain & Ireland; together with a section on Indian and Colonial Museums.
- Platnauer, H. M. 1911. "Note on an Inscribed Roman Slab", Annual Report of the Yorkshire Philosophical Society.
