= Walter Harvey Brook =

British antiquarian and artist (1863–1943)

- Born: 1863; Salford, Lancashire, England
- Died: 6 April 1943 (aged 79–80); York, England
- Occupations: Antiquarian, Artist and Curator

Walter Harvey Brook (1863 – 6 April 1943) was an English antiquarian, artist and curator based in York.

== Biography ==
Walter was born in Salford, Lancashire the son of York businessman Harvey Brookand. He trained as an architect in London and travelled as a young man, painting some aspects of his journeys. He visited Australia in 1883, Colombo and Aden in 1887 and New Zealand in 1890. He also spent much time in France between 1895 and 1905. He produced over 113 paintings, drawing primarily on historical buildings and landscapes for inspiration.

In 1904 and 1905, Brook reconstructed Jacobs Well, a historic house in York, at his own expense.

Harvey Brook was appointed Honorary Curator of Medieval Archaeology in the Yorkshire Museum in 1912 by the Yorkshire Philosophical Society. He assisted with excavations within the grounds of St. Mary's Abbey and drew and painted aspects of Medieval York, including a series of six painting of Holy Trinity Church, York. In 1905 Harvey Brook was responsible for the restoration of Jacob's Well – a 15th century house associated with Holy Trinity Church, York Following the construction of the Tempest Anderson Hall in the Yorkshire Museum he collaborated with E. Ridsdale Tate in founding and shaping the Museum of Medieval Architecture beneath it in 1912. He continued to be associated with the Yorkshire Philosophical Society until his death in 1943, maintaining his post as Honorary Curator as well as becoming vice-president of the YPS in 1923 and part of the committee for the restoration of St. Mary's Abbey in 1939.

Prior to the 1922 death of his colleague E. Ridsdale Tate, Harvey Brook's dedication to Medieval Architecture was described in one of his final lectures: "The arrangement in their new home (of the Medieval stonework from St. Mary's Abbey, York) was begun and carried on under the guidance of Mr. Harvey Brook, who, I may say, has with loving care tended these fragments from the moment they were touched by the workmen till they rested safely in a more spacious abode."

== Excavations of St. Mary' Abbey ==
In 1913, Harvey Brook supervised the excavation and partial rebuilding of a portion of the North and East Cloister alleys. These walls had been partially destroyed during the construction of the York Museum Gardens in 1828. Brook was self-funded for much of the excavation of the Abbey and devoted a great deal of time to the cataloguing and presentation of the architectural stonework.
