= St Mary's Abbey, York =

Scheduled monument ruin in York, England

St Mary's Abbey
- Ruins of St Mary's Abbey Church
- Interactive map of St Mary's Abbey

Monastery information
- Order: Benedictine
- Established: 1088; 938 years ago
- Disestablished: 1539; 487 years ago
- Dedication: St Mary
- Diocese: York

People
- Founders: Stephen of Whitby, Alan Rufus, William II of England, William the Conqueror

Architecture
- Heritage designation: Scheduled monument
- Designated date: 19 April 1915
- Style: Gothic

Site
- Location: York, Yorkshire, England
- Coordinates: 53°57′41″N 1°05′17″W
- Visible remains: Hospitium, precinct walls, gatehouse, abbey church (ruins with part of the nave and crossing still standing), abbot's house (substantially altered); statues and other remains in the Yorkshire Museum.
- Public access: yes (Museum Gardens)

The Abbey of St Mary is a ruined Benedictine abbey in York, England and a scheduled monument.

== History ==
Once one of the most prosperous abbeys in Northern England, its remains lie in what are now the York Museum Gardens, on a steeply-sloping site to the west of York Minster.

The original church on the site was founded in 1055 and dedicated to Saint Olaf. After the Norman Conquest the church came into the possession of the Anglo-Breton magnate Alan Rufus who granted the lands to Abbot Stephen and a group of monks from Whitby. The abbey church was refounded in 1088 when King William II of England visited York in January or February of that year and gave the monks additional lands. The following year he laid the foundation stone of the new Norman church and the site was rededicated to the Virgin Mary. The foundation ceremony was attended by bishop Odo of Bayeux and Archbishop Thomas of Bayeux. The monks moved to York from a site at Lastingham in Ryedale in the 1080s and are recorded there in the Domesday Book of 1086. Following a dispute and riot in 1132, a party of reform-minded monks left to establish the Cistercian monastery of Fountains Abbey. In 1137 the abbey was badly damaged by a great fire. The surviving ruins date from a rebuilding programme begun in 1271 and finished by 1294.

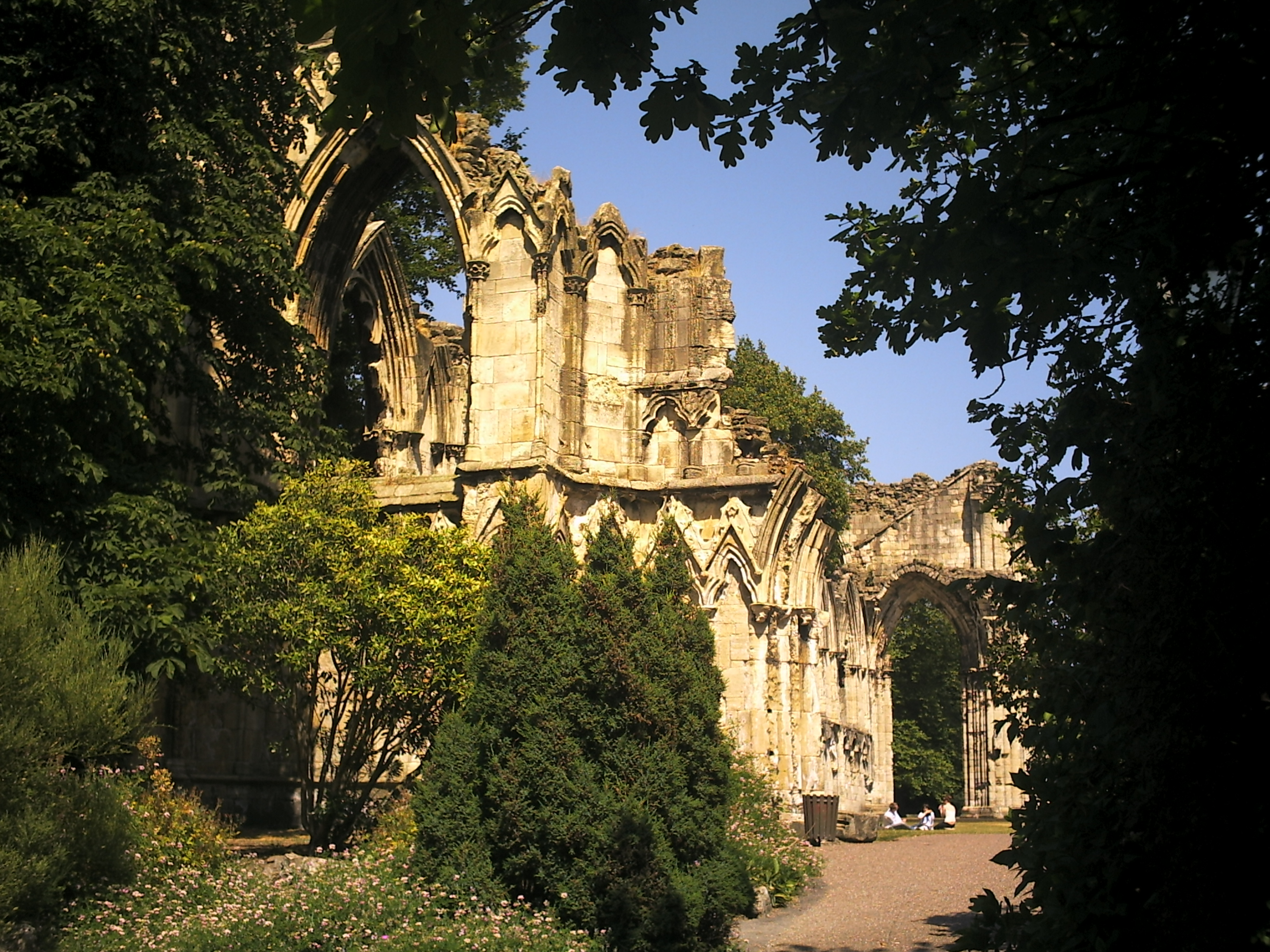
Ruins of the abbey church from the southern end

=== Precinct ===
The abbey occupied an extensive precinct site immediately outside the city walls, between Bootham and the River Ouse. The original boundary included a ditch and a narrow strip of ground, but the walled circuit was constructed above this in the 1260s in the Abbacy of Simon de Warwick; the walls were nearly three-quarters of a mile long. In 1318 the abbot received royal permission to raise the height of the wall and crenellate it; a stretch of this wall still runs along Bootham and Marygate to the River Ouse.

The gatehouse in Marygate and its lodge formed part of a range of buildings that linked to the older church of St Olave by a chapel dedicated to Mary. Though work on the chapel and gatehouse was under way 1314 and completed in 1320, the surviving structures are mostly of fifteenth-century origin.

St Mary's Tower is a structure at the corner of Marygate and Bootham.

=== Abbey Church ===
The abbey church is aligned northeast–southwest, due to restrictions of the site. The original Norman church had an apsidal liturgical east end, and its side aisles ended in apses, though they were square on the exterior. Rebuilding began in 1270, under the direction of Abbot Simon de Warwick, and was swiftly completed during a single twenty-four year building campaign, such was the financial strength of the abbey. The completed abbey church was 350 feet (110 m) in length, consisted of a nave with aisles, north and south transepts with chapels in an eastern aisle, and a presbytery with aisles. To the east of the cloister and on the line of the transepts were a vestibule leading to the chapter house, the scriptorium and library. Beyond the church lay the kitchen, novices' building and infirmary. The Abbey chronicle (which has not been fully translated from Latin) names the project officers as Simon de Warwick, a monk administrator and the master stonemason Master Simon, all of whom were still alive upon the completion of the project in 1294.

=== The Abbot's House ===
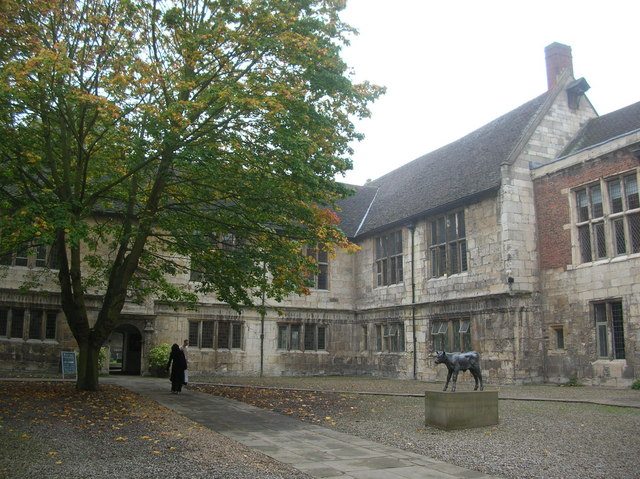
The abbot's house

The abbot's house, built of brick in 1483, survives as the King's Manor because it became the seat of the Council of the North in 1539; the abbots of St Mary's and the abbey featured in the medieval and early modern ballads of Robin Hood, with the abbot usually as Robin Hood's nemesis.

In August 1513 the Abbot supplied four chests for the use of Philip Tilney, treasurer of the English army before the Battle of Flodden. The Abbey seems to have become the accounting office for the army in the north, involving Thomas Magnus, Archdeacon of the East Riding, and two monks of the abbey, Richard Wode and Richard Rypon.

=== The Dissolution ===
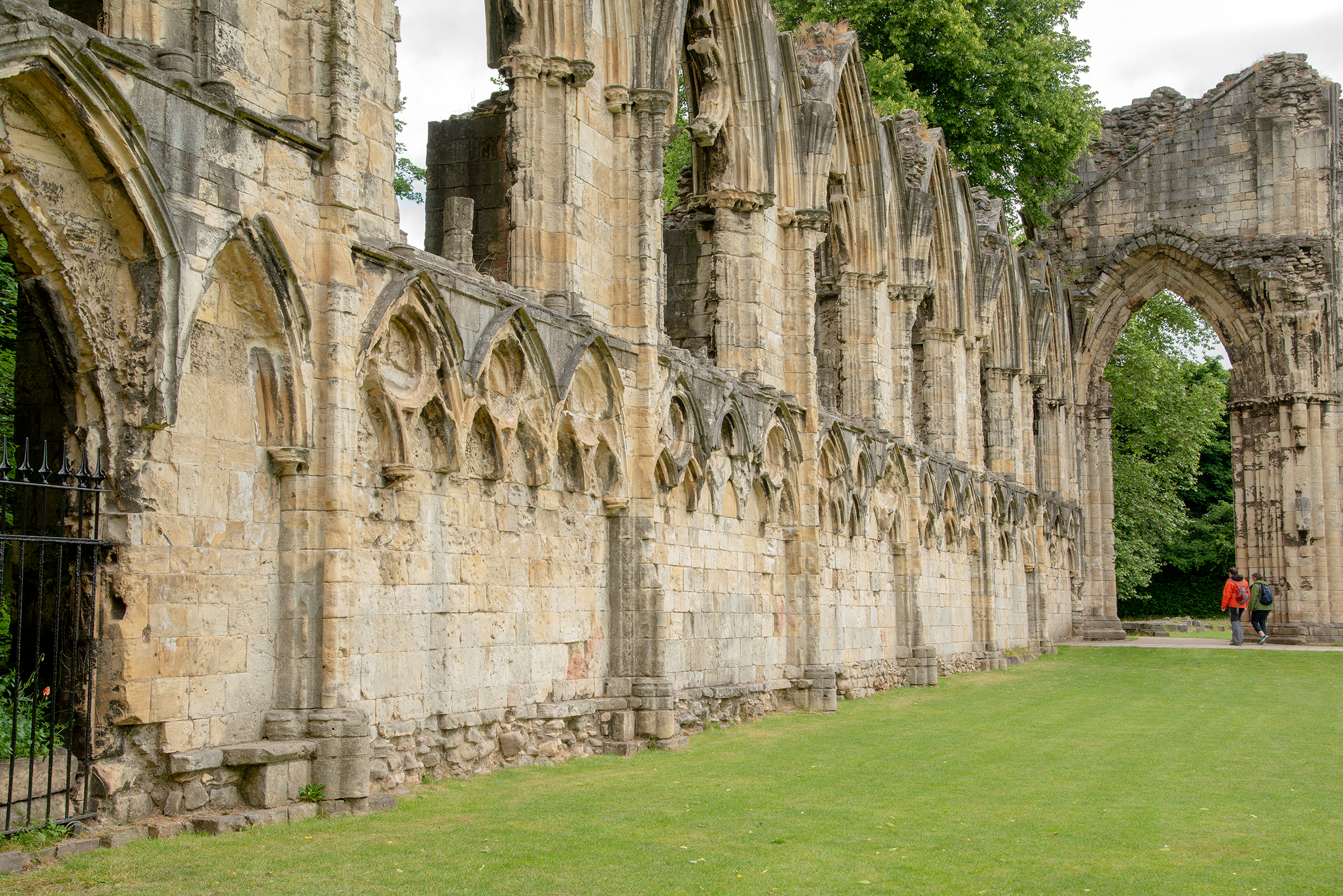
A portion of the remaining walls

St Mary's, the largest and richest Benedictine establishment in the north of England and one of the largest landholders in Yorkshire, was worth over £2,000 a year, (equivalent to £1,680,000 in 2025), when it was valued in 1539, during the dissolution of the monasteries under Henry VIII; it was closed and subsequently substantially destroyed. On 26 November 1539 the Abbey surrendered £2,085 and 50 monks to the Crown.

=== Library ===
A fifteenth-century index catalogue records that the Abbey's library originally contained over 750 books. Approximately thirty-five texts from the Abbey are currently extant, including only five printed books; these include a 15th-century copy of Richard Rolle's Incendium Amoris.

==== Brother Grayson's Bible ====
A Vulgate Bible, sold at auction in England in 2010, has been identified as the possession of Brother John Grayson from St Mary's Abbey. It is an octavo volume and was printed on 8 November 1526 by Thielmann Kerver in Paris. Brother Grayson was first noted at the Abbey in 1528 but was absent from its pension list at the time of the Dissolution in 1539.

==== The Anonimalle Chronicle ====
The Anonimalle Chronicle is an important chronicle whose scope extends from the legendary Brutus to 1381. It was composed in Anglo-Norman by an anonymous monk of St Mary's Abbey towards the end of the 14th century. It includes the most detailed surviving description of a medieval parliament and a well-informed account of the Peasants' Revolt of 1381; these are likely to have been written by eyewitnesses and later incorporated into the chronicle. The body of the chronicle from Brutus to the year 1307 has been described as a variant of the Brut Chronicle, but there are considerable differences (e.g. the chronicler shows an interest in early ecclesiastical history which the Brut does not). From 1307 to 1333 it follows the main Brut tradition more closely though it demonstrates a marked London interest. After 1333 the chronicle is an individual account probably drawing on sources originating in London. The manuscript was known to the 16th-century antiquaries Francis Thynne and John Stow; its title derives from Thynne's description of it. It afterwards passed through the hands of various owners until it was found in the possession of the Ingilby family of Ripley Castle in 1920. The section from 1333 to 1381 was edited by V. H. Galbraith and published in 1927. In 1982 it was acquired by the Brotherton Collection, at the University of Leeds. Another partial edition appeared in 1991 in the form of an edition and translation of the chronicle from 1307 to 1334 by Wendy Childs and John Taylor.

== Excavations in the Abbey precinct ==
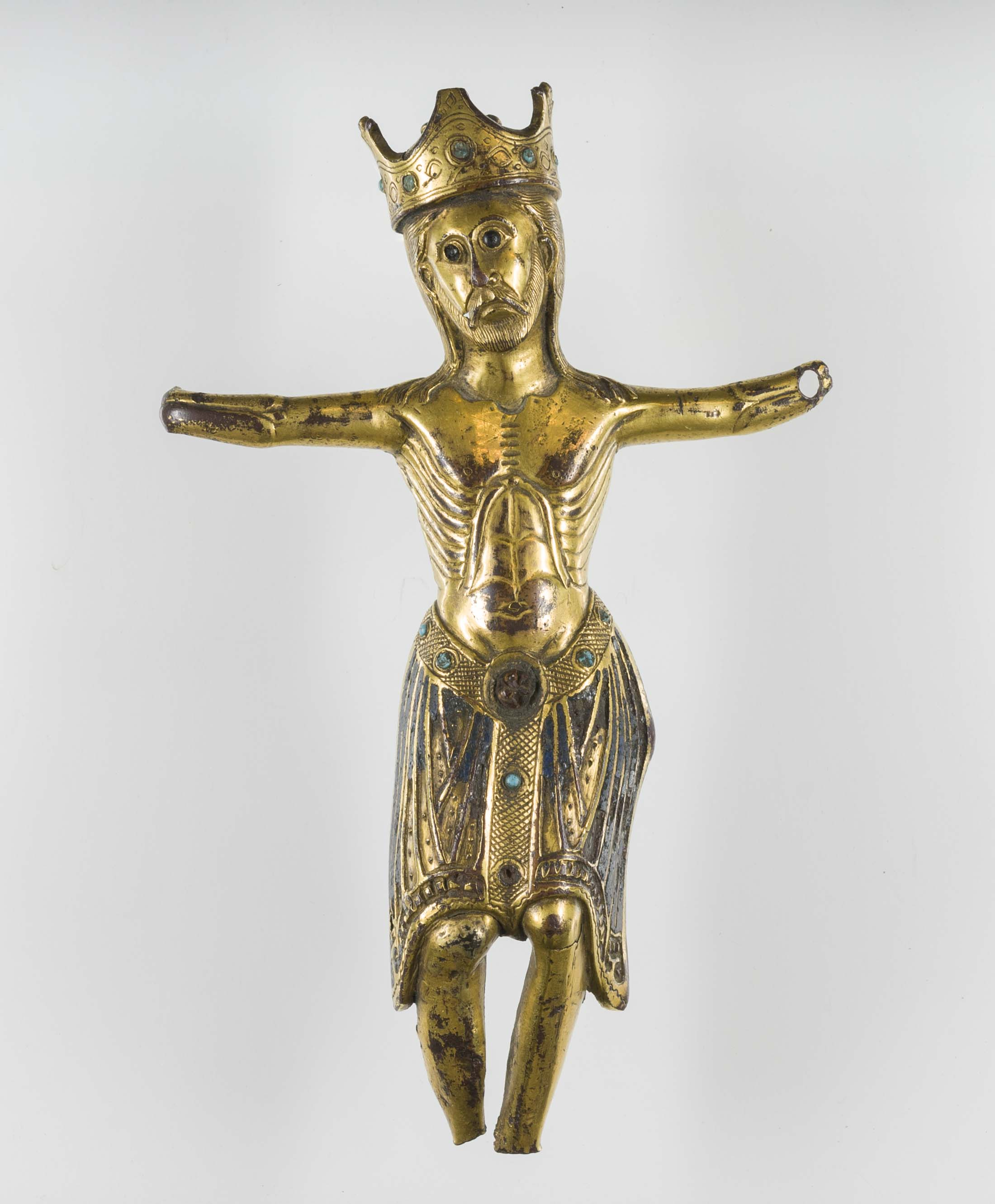
The St. Mary's Abbey Figurine of Christ

The Yorkshire Museum, built for the Yorkshire Philosophical Society, stands in part of the abbey cloister; parts of the east, south and west cloister walls were temporarily excavated in 1827–29 preparatory to digging the museum's foundations. The relationship between the Museum and abbey is historically quite intimate as part of the richly carved chapter house vestibule (c. 1298–1307) survives incorporated into Tempest Anderson Hall lecture theatre (1911–12). These walls and part of the warming house are retained in the Museum as part of the Medieval gallery display.

Excavations of the chapter house were undertaken in 1912 by the honorary curator of Medieval archaeology, Walter Harvey-Brook who, along with E. Ridsdale Tate designed and developed the Museum of Medieval Architecture on the site.

Further excavations in the abbey were undertaken in 1952–56 by the then Keeper of the Yorkshire Museum, George Willmot who encountered the pre-Norman and Roman layers beneath the west wing of the nave.

Excavations in 2014 and 2015 discovered an apse in the south transept, large parts of the wall foundations, and numerous residual small finds dating from the Roman to Modern periods. These investigations also encountered fragments of human remains, disturbed from burials somewhere on the site. One of the major conclusions of these excavations was the prevalence of in situ archaeological remains at a very shallow depth beneath the modern ground surface; in some cases as little as 7 cm underground.

=== Figure of Jesus Christ ===
A 13th-century gilt, Limoges enamel figurine depicting Christ (the St Mary's Abbey Figurine) was discovered in the Abbey in 1826, having avoided the dissolution of the monastery in 1539. It disappeared soon afterwards, and was thought by some to have been destroyed, only to be discovered in a private art collection in Germany in the 1920s. In 2019, the York Museums Trust bought the figurine and displayed it in the Yorkshire Museum.

== Abbots of St. Mary's ==
The abbots of St. Mary's were entitled to wear a mitre and were habitually summoned to Parliament. In total there are known to have been some 30 Abbots, including:

Abbot	Dates of Abbacy	Notes
Stephen of Whitby	1088–1112	
Richard	1112–1131	
Gaufried	1131–1133	Seceded
Severinus (or Savaricus)	– 1161	Died in office
Clement	1161–1184	Died in office
Robert de Harpham	1184–1195	Deposed
Robert de Longo Campo	1197–1239	Died in office
William de Roundel	1241–1244	Died in office
Thomas de Warthill (Wardhull)	1244–1258	Died in office
Simon de Warwick	1258–1296	Died in office
Benedict de Malton	1296–1303	Resigned
John de Gilling	1303–1313	Died in office
Alan de Wasse	1313–1331	Died in office
Thomas de Malton	1331–1359	Resigned
William de Mary's	?1359–1382	Died in office
William de Bradford (Bridford or Brydford)	1382–1389	Died in office
Thomas de Staynesgrave	1389–1398	Died in office
Thomas de Pygott (Pygdt)	1398–1405	Died in office
Thomas de Spoffoth	8 June 1405–?1421	Resigned
William Dalton	1422–1423	Died in office
William Wells	1423–1436	Resigned
Roger Kyrkby (or Kiby)	1437–1438	Died in office
John Cottingham	1438–1464	Died in office
Thomas Bothe (Booth)	1464–1485	Resigned
William Senhouse (Sever)	1485–1502	Later Bishop of Durham 1502–1505
Robert Wanhope	1502–?1507	
Edmund Thornton	1507–?1521	
Edmund Whalley	1521–1530	
William Thornton	1530–1539	Abbot during the dissolution of the monasteries

== Burials ==
- Stephen, Count of Tréguier
- Abbot Thomas Spofforth.
- William de Vescy of Kildare

== Remains ==
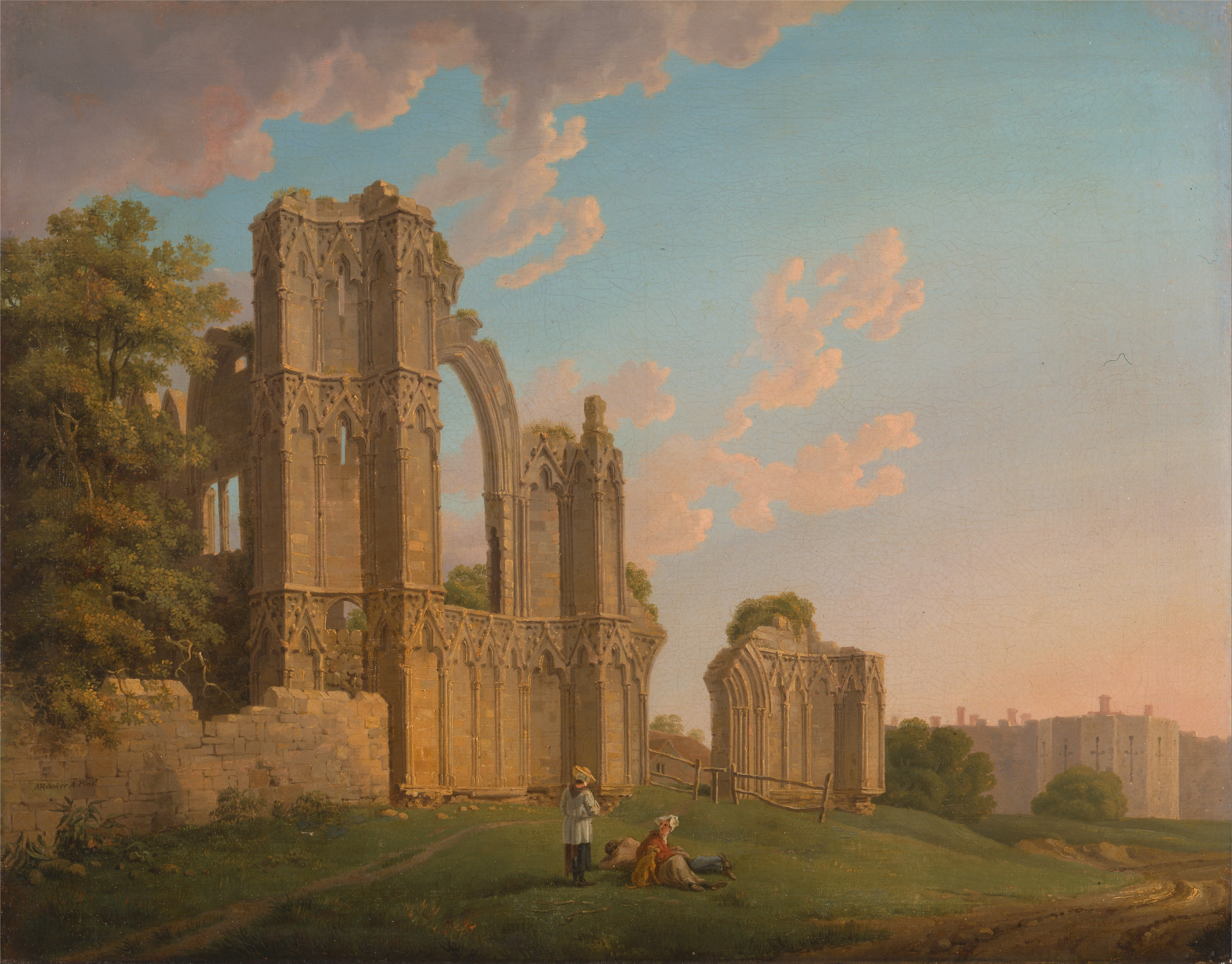
Painting of the surviving ruins by Michael Angelo Rooker in 1778

Visible remains of St Mary's Abbey, York

All that remains today are the north and west walls, plus a few other remnants: the half-timbered Pilgrims' Hospitium, the West Gate and the 14th-century timber-framed Abbot's House (now called the King's Manor). The walls include interval towers along the north and west stretches, St Mary's Tower at the northwest corner, and a polygonal water tower by the river. Much stone was removed from the site in the 18th century, in 1705 for St. Olave's Church, between 1717 and 1720 for Beverley Minster, and in 1736 for the landing stage of Lendal Ferry.

The remains of the Abbey were described by E. Ridsdale Tate in a 1929 publication in which he asserted that: "Nowhere in England is there another spot so full of charm as York and where in York is there a more charming spot than the Gardens of the Philosophical Society, in which stand the beautiful fragments of that once powerful and noble monastery of St. Mary's. Here we must leave the venerable pile in the evening of its glory."

== See also ==
- Grade I listed churches in the East Riding of Yorkshire and the City of York
- History of York
- List of monasteries dissolved by Henry VIII of England
- Listed buildings in York (outside the city walls, northern part)
- York City Walls
- York Museum Gardens
