= Yorkshire Philosophical Society =

Charitable learned society in the City of York, North Yorkshire, England

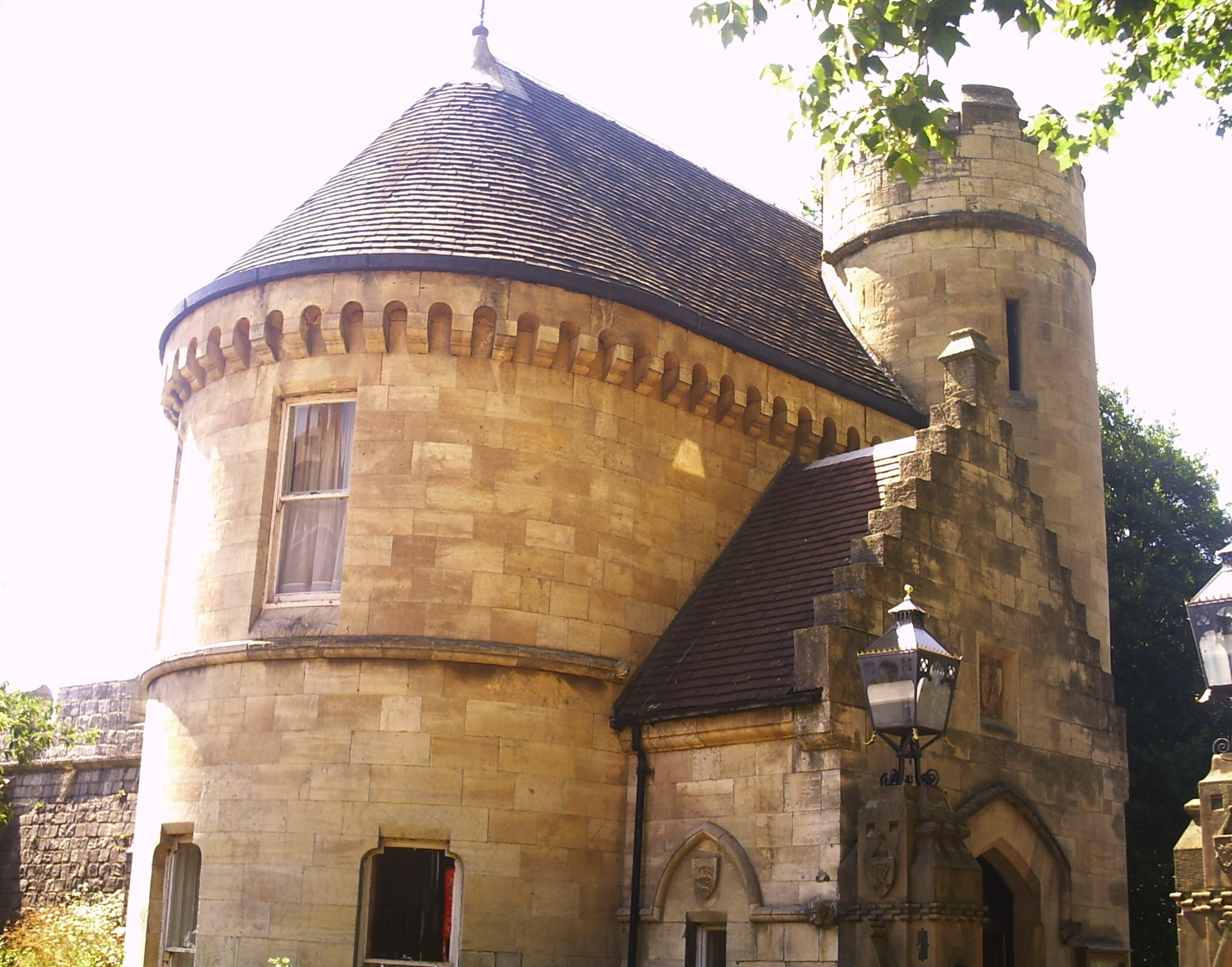
- The Lodge, Museum Gardens, York home of the Yorkshire Philosophical Society's offices and reading room.
- Formation: 1822
- Type: Learned society
- Purpose: Historical, Archaeological and Scientific
- Location: York
- Activities: Research & publications, lectures & events
- Founders: James Atkinson, William Salmond, Anthony Thorpe and William Vernon
- President: Tba
- Affiliations: Yorkshire Museum, Museum Gardens
- Website: yps.org

The Yorkshire Philosophical Society (YPS) is a charitable learned society (charity reg. 529709) which aims to promote the public understanding of the natural sciences, the social sciences, and the archaeology and history of York and Yorkshire.

== History ==
The Society was formed in York in December 1822 by James Atkinson, William Salmond, Anthony Thorpe and William Vernon. The Society's aim was to gain and spread knowledge related to science and history and they built a large collection for this purpose. The geologist John Phillips was employed as the Society's first keeper of its museum. In 1828 the Society was given, by royal grant, some of the grounds of St Mary's Abbey including the ruins of the abbey. On this land the Society constructed a number of buildings including the Yorkshire Museum built to house the Society's geological and archaeological collections and opened in 1830. Landscape architect Sir John Murray Naysmith was commissioned by the Society to create a botanical gardens around the museum during the 1830s.

== Organisation ==
The Yorkshire Philosophical Society is a registered charity, and has an open subscription-based membership. The offices and reading room of the YPS are located in Museum Gardens Lodge in York.

== Honorary members ==
In 1933 Frank Elgee resigned as Curator of the Dorman Museum due to ill health and his wife Harriett Wragg Elgee, was appointed Curator holding that position until 1938. In 1933 his work was recognised and he was awarded an Honorary Degree of 'Doctor of Philosophy' by Leeds University. He was elected an Honorary Member of the Yorkshire Philosophical Society in 1936.

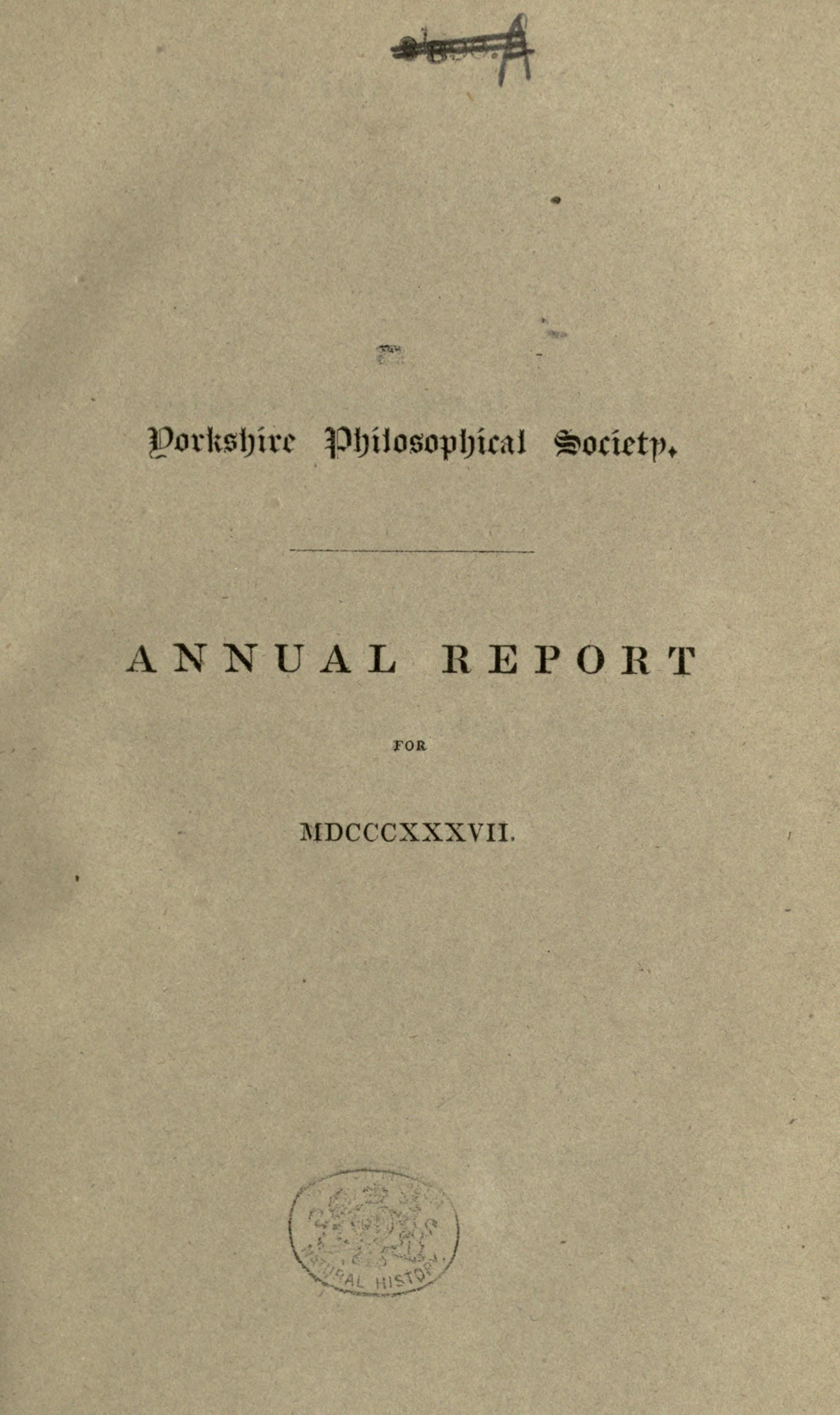
Title page of the 1835 Annual report of the Yorkshire Philosophical Society

== Notable members ==
- Tempest Anderson (d. 1913), photographer and vulcanologist.
- James Atkinson (d. 1839), surgeon and bibliographer.
- Edward Charlesworth (d. 1893), Keeper of the Yorkshire Museum and paleontologist.
- Mary Kitson Clark (1905–2005), Curator of Roman Antiquities at the Yorkshire Museum, archaeologist, and independent scholar.
- John Phillips (d.1874), geologist.
- Walter Harvey Brook (d. 1943), Honorary Curator of the Yorkshire Museum and medieval archaeologist.
- E. Ridsdale Tate (d. 1922), artist and architect.
- William Vernon Harcourt (d.1871), one of the founders of British Association for the Advancement of Science.

== Current activities ==
The Society holds a series of free public lectures every year covering subjects including science, technology, history, archaeology and geography. Research grants are given by the Society in connection with its area of interest and awards are available for archaeology students.

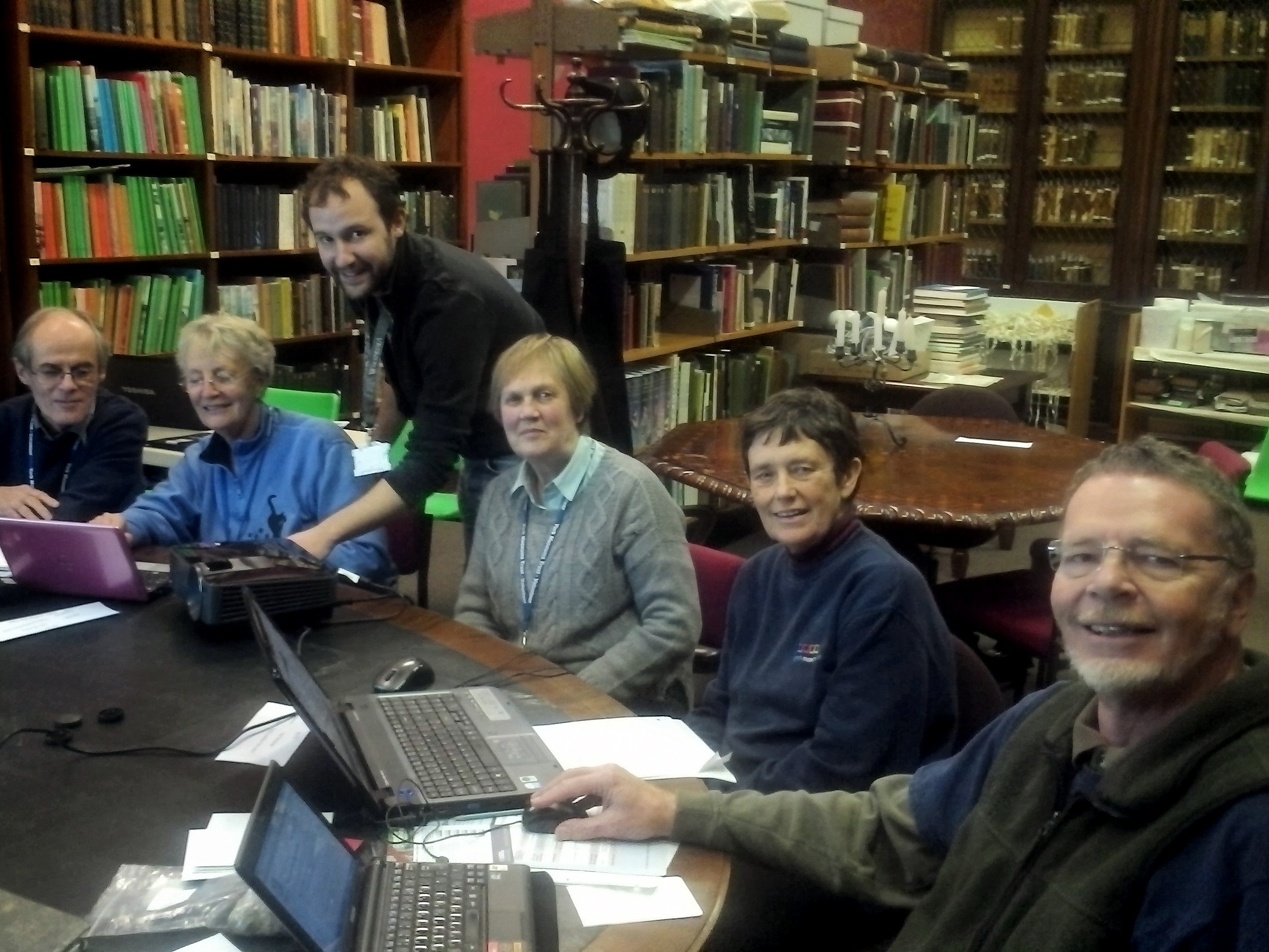
Yorkshire Philosophical Society volunteers working in the historic library of the Yorkshire Museum in 2013
