= William Vernon Harcourt (scientist) =

English cleric and scientist

Rev. William Venables-Vernon Harcourt (1789 – April 1871) was an English cleric, founder of the British Association for the Advancement of Science, canon residentiary of the York Cathedral, and later rector of Bolton Percy.

== Family ==
He was born at Sudbury, Derbyshire, a younger son of Edward Vernon-Harcourt, Archbishop of York and his wife Lady Anne Leveson-Gower, who was a daughter of Granville Leveson-Gower, 1st Marquess of Stafford and his second wife Lady Louisa Egerton. Her maternal grandparents were Scroop Egerton, 1st Duke of Bridgewater and his second wife Rachel Russell. Rachel was a daughter of Wriothesley Russell, 2nd Duke of Bedford and the rich heiress Elizabeth Howland, daughter of John Howland of Streatham.

== Career ==
After he had served in the navy, on the West Indian station, for five years, his father allowed him to become a clergyman. He was a student of Christ Church, Oxford, in 1807, graduating B.A. in 1811 and M.A. in 1814, and remained a student of Christ Church till 1815. He was on good terms with Cyril Jackson, the dean and Dr. John Kidd, then a teacher of chemistry at his college, influenced him.

On leaving university in 1811, Harcourt began duties as a clergyman at Bishopthorpe, Yorkshire and aided the movement for establishing an institution in Yorkshire for the cultivation of science. He constructed a laboratory, and occupied himself in chemical analysis, aided by his early friends Davy and Wollaston.

In 1821, remains of prehistoric life found by William Buckland in the cavern of Kirkdale went to form the basis of a museum, connected with the Yorkshire Philosophical Society, of which Harcourt was the first president. In 1824, he was elected a fellow of the Royal Society. He was elected to honorary membership of the Manchester Literary and Philosophical Society in 1894.

The first meeting of the British Association for the Advancement of Science was held at York in September 1831, and the general plan of its proceedings, and the laws to govern it, were drawn up by Harcourt, who was appointed general secretary. At the Birmingham meeting of the association in 1839, Harcourt was elected president. The subject of his address was the history of the composition of water, supporting the claims of Henry Cavendish to the discovery by original documents, and vindicating the claims of science to freedom of inquiry. Another subject to which Harcourt directed his inquiries was the effect of heat on inorganic compounds.

For 40 years, he worked to acquire glasses of definite and mutually compensative dispersions, for achromatic combinations. In this work, he was supported by George Stokes.

As a cleric, Harcourt became canon of York, and rector of Wheldrake in Yorkshire in 1824, and of Bolton Percy, Yorkshire, in 1837. The Yorkshire School for the Blind, and the Castle Howard Reformatory, and other institutions, owed their existence to him.

In 1861, on the death of his elder brother, George Granville Harcourt, he succeeded to the Harcourt estates at Nuneham Courtenay in Oxfordshire, and his latter years were spent at Nuneham House among his books and in the society of men of culture and science.

Harcourt died in April 1871, in his eighty-second year.

== Family ==
He married, in 1824, Matilda Mary, daughter of Colonel William Gooch, by whom he had two sons and five daughters; including:

- Edward William Harcourt (1825–1891) of Nuneham
  - Edith Harcourt married Murray Finch-Hatton, 12th Earl of Winchilsea, son of the 10th Earl and Fanny Rice (great niece of Jane Austen)
- Right Hon. Sir William Vernon Harcourt (1827–1904)
  - Lewis Harcourt, 1st Viscount Harcourt married Mary Ethel Burns, niece of J. P. Morgan.
- Cecilia Caroline Harcort, who married Admiral Sir Edward Rice (1819–1902) (great nephew of Jane Austen)

He changed his name from Vernon-Harcourt to Harcourt circa 1830.

== Works ==
- Letter to Henry Lord Brougham, F.R.S. &c., Containing Remarks on Certain Statements in his Lives of Black, Watt and Cavendish (1846)
- Symmetrical psalmody; or, Portions of the Psalms and other Scriptures, tr. into metrical stanzas, with corresponding accents in corresponding verses, for Musical Use (1855); G. Bell.
- Sermons, with an introductory preface by W. F. Hook (1873); London, Simpkin, Marschall, and Co.
