= York Museum Gardens =

Botanic gardens in York, England

Coordinates: 53°57′41″N 1°05′17″W

Museum Gardens
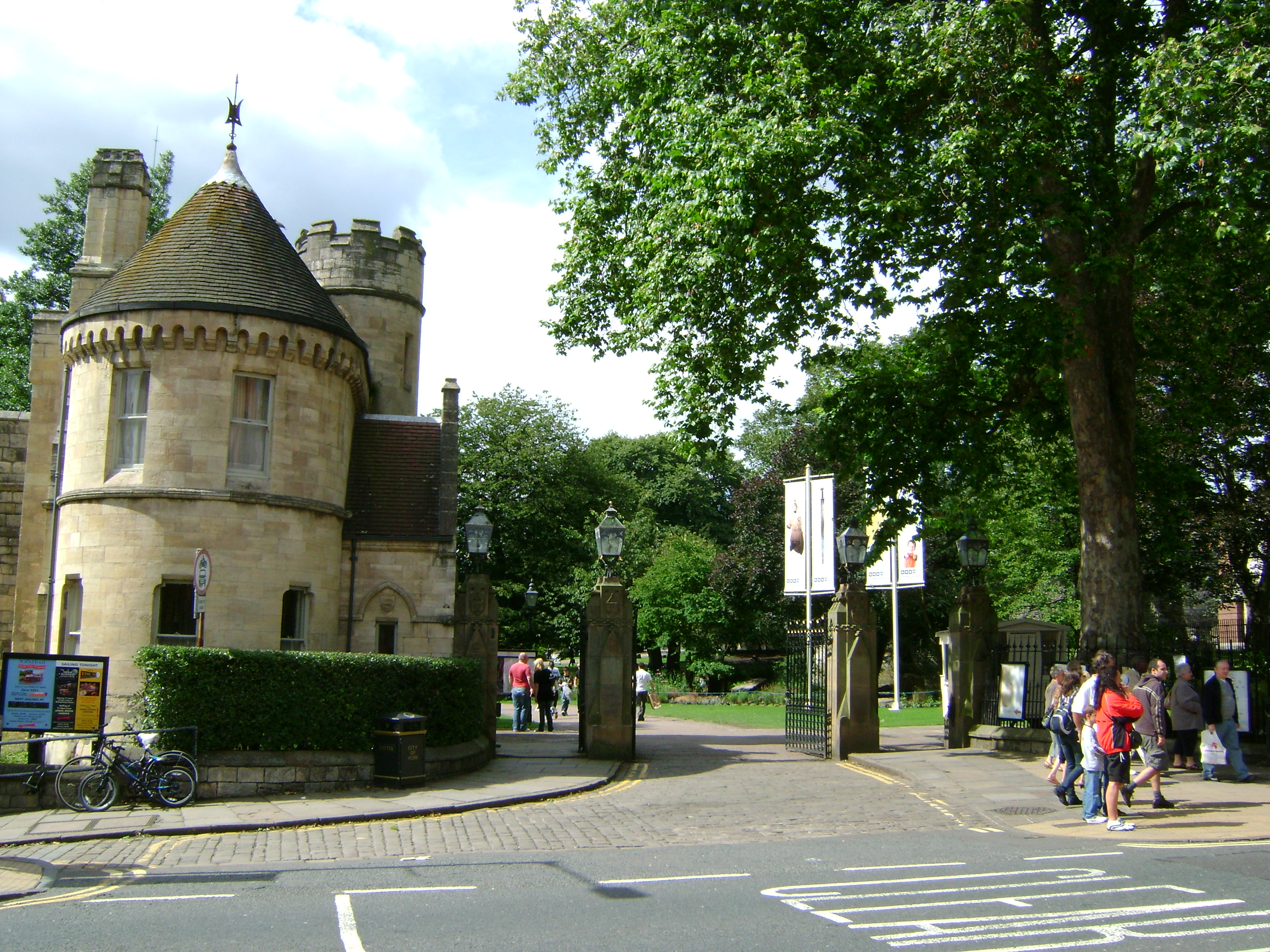
- Main Gates and lodge house of York Museum Gardens
- Interactive map of Museum Gardens
- Location: York, England
- Area: 10 acres (4.0 ha)
- Created: 1835
- Operator: York Museums Trust
- Visitors: 1,651,508 (2019–2020)
- Status: Open 7 days a week, 9 am to 6 pm.
- Website: http://www.yorkmuseumgardens.org.uk/

The York Museum Gardens are botanic gardens in the centre of York, England, beside the River Ouse. They cover an area of 10 acres (4.0 ha) of the former grounds of St Mary's Abbey, and were created in the 1830s by the Yorkshire Philosophical Society along with the Yorkshire Museum which they contain.

The gardens are held in trust by the City of York Council and are managed by the York Museums Trust. They were designed in a gardenesque style by landscape architect Sir John Murray Naysmith, and contain a variety of species of plants, trees and birds. Admission is free. A variety of events take place in the gardens, such as open-air theatre performances and festival activities.

There are several historic buildings in the gardens. They contain the remains of the west corner of the Roman fort of Eboracum, including the Multangular Tower and parts of the Roman walls. In the same area there is also the Anglian Tower, which was probably built into the remains of a late Roman period fortress. During the Middle Ages, the tower was expanded and the Roman walls were incorporated into York's city walls. Most of the other buildings dating from the Middle Ages are associated with St Mary's Abbey, including the ruins of the abbey church, the Hospitium, the lodge and part of the surviving precinct wall. The remains of St. Leonard's Hospital chapel and undercroft are on the east side of the gardens. The Yorkshire Philosophical Society constructed several buildings in the gardens during the 19th and early 20th century, including the Yorkshire Museum and its octagonal observatory. The museum houses four permanent collections, covering biology, geology, archaeology and astronomy.

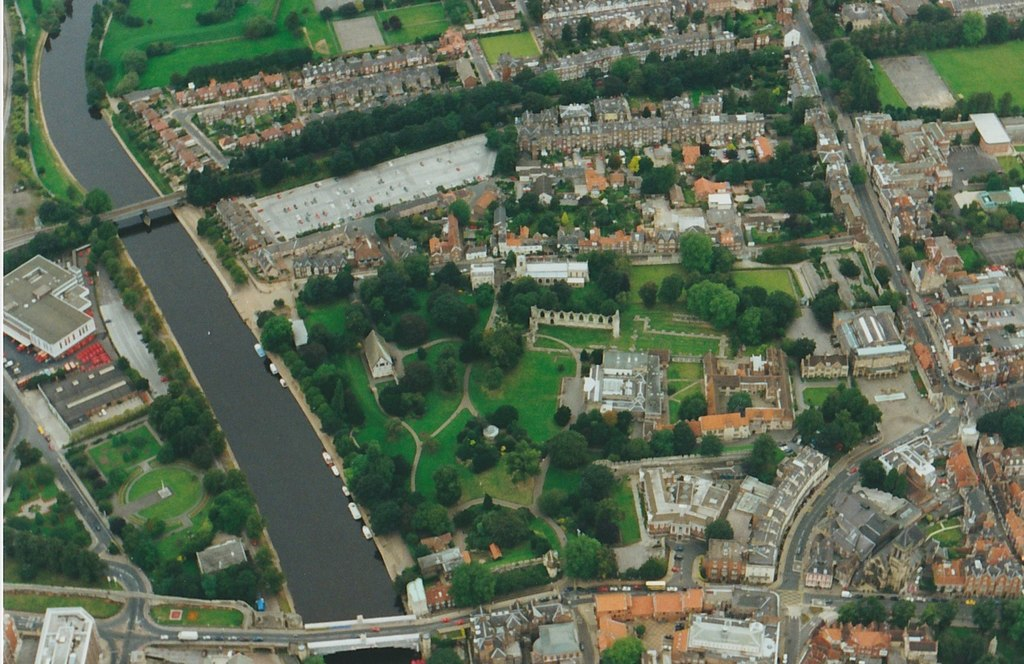
Museum Gardens in 2000 from a hot-air balloon

== History ==
The gardens, which were given to the Yorkshire Philosophical Society by the British royal family in 1828, occupy part of the former grounds of St. Mary's Abbey. The society acquired the land to build a museum to house its collections; the Yorkshire Museum was completed in 1830. The land was granted to the Yorkshire Philosophical Society under the condition that botanical gardens would be established on the site. These were created during the 1830s in a gardenesque style design by landscape architect Sir John Murray Naysmith. They originally contained a conservatory, a pond and a menagerie, which was destroyed when a bear escaped from it and had brief control of the area. The then Princess Victoria visited the gardens in 1835, the year that they were first open to the public. In 1854 the gardens were described as "one of the principal attractions of York". At this time entrance was free to members and for non-members entrance cost one shilling except on Saturday when it cost six pence.

In 1960, the gardens and the Yorkshire Museum were given in trust to the City of York Council and they became a public park. Since 2002, they have been managed by the York Museums Trust, along with York Castle Museum and York Art Gallery. The gardens are maintained by the Askham Bryan College of Agriculture.

== Description ==
Plan of Museum Gardens York: 1. Yorkshire Museum, 2. City Wall, 3 Anglian Tower, 4. Multangular Tower, 5. Roman Wall, 6. St. Leonards Hospital, 7. Museum Street, 8. Lodge, 9. Toilet, 10. River Ouse, 11. Hospitium, 12. Abbey Precinct Wall, 13. Gatehouse, 14. St. Olave's Church, 15. Marygate, 16. Bowling Green, 17. St. Mary's Abbey, 18. Observatory

York Museum Gardens cover an area of 10 acres (4.0 ha) on the north bank of the River Ouse, just outside the city walls in the centre of York. There are four entrances to the gardens: on Marygate (off Bootham) by St Olave's Church, on Museum Street by Lendal Bridge, via a path at the side of King's Manor, and from the riverside walk next to the River Ouse. The site slopes gently down towards the river and is made up of historical buildings and undulating lawns interspersed with plants and trees. The gardens are open to the public during daylight hours, so the opening and closing times vary throughout the year. Normally admission is free but there are charges for some events. In 2010 it was estimated that the gardens attract 1.3 million visitors a year. Drinking alcohol, cycling and ball games are not allowed in the gardens.

=== Plants ===
There are approximately 4,500 plants and trees in the collection, some of the varieties native to England and some from other parts of the world. Planting consists of large beds containing predominantly shrubs and trees, and lawns interspersed with individual trees. Species of tree include a monkey puzzle tree along with oak and chestnut trees; six of the trees in the gardens are classed as county champion trees: Fraxinus angustifolia 'Lentiscifolia', Pyrus elaeagrifolia, Carpinus betulus 'Incisa', Alnus glutinosa 'Imperialis', Tilia cordata, Fagus sylvatica 'Miltonensis'. There is a rockery next to the Marygate entrance, by the ruins of the abbey church, and in front of the entrance to the Yorkshire Museum there is a terrace bordered with beds of white roses, the symbol of Yorkshire.

There is an 'Edible Wood' located behind York Art Gallery, in the north-west corner of the gardens. The wood was planted in July 2015 and features plants that have an edible component and are both attractive and useful.

=== Animals ===
In the early 19th century, the gardens included a menagerie. Henry Baines' daughter, Fanny, recalled 70 years later that in this period the menageries contained a bear, a golden eagle, and several monkeys, amongst other animals. In 1831, a bear from the menagerie got loose in the gardens and reportedly chased the Keeper of the Yorkshire Museum, John Phillips, and Reverend Harcourt into an outbuilding. The bear was subsequently sent to London Zoo.

The gardens are home to a population of semi-tame grey squirrels and many species of birds. A 1970 report covering the period 1965–1969 listed the vertebrates resident in the gardens at that time: Common wood pigeon, Tawny owl, Blue tit, Eurasian Wren, Dunnock, European Robin, European greenfinch, Mistle thrush, Song thrush, Blackbird, and House sparrow, Common shrew, Wood mouse, and Brown rat. Until 2006 a family of peacocks had been in residence for at least 70 years, though numbers had fluctuated since at least 2001 as birds occasionally escaped or were involved in traffic accidents on nearby Museum Street.

In 2012 the gardens was one of the release sites for a new population of the endangered Tansy beetle and, as of 2015, is one of the best places to see them in the wild. In 2018 a leaf-mining fly, Phytomyza scotina, was discovered mining the leaves of sage plants in the gardens – it was subsequently described as a new species for Britain.

=== Geology ===
There is a geological oddity close to the main gates, consisting of a large boulder of pink granite that was discovered during construction of the city's railway station. Since this type of stone is not local it was determined as having been transported there from Shap in Cumbria by glacial action during the last ice age. In 2015, to celebrate the 200th anniversary of the publication of the geological map of Britain by William Smith, a mosaic map was commissioned for the Gardens from artist Janette Ireland which shows the geological strata of Yorkshire in pebbles of the corresponding stone.

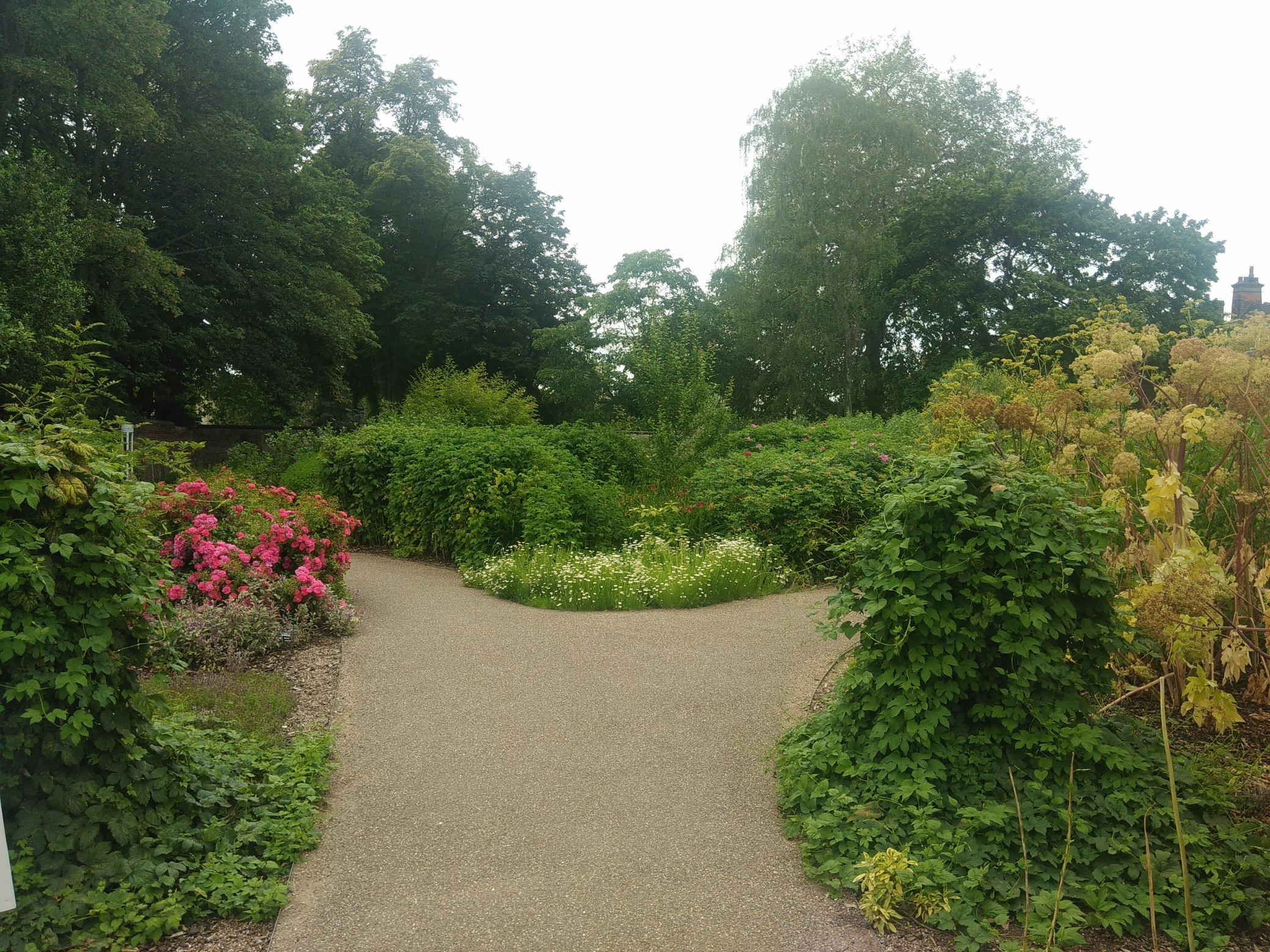
The 'Edible Wood' in July 2019

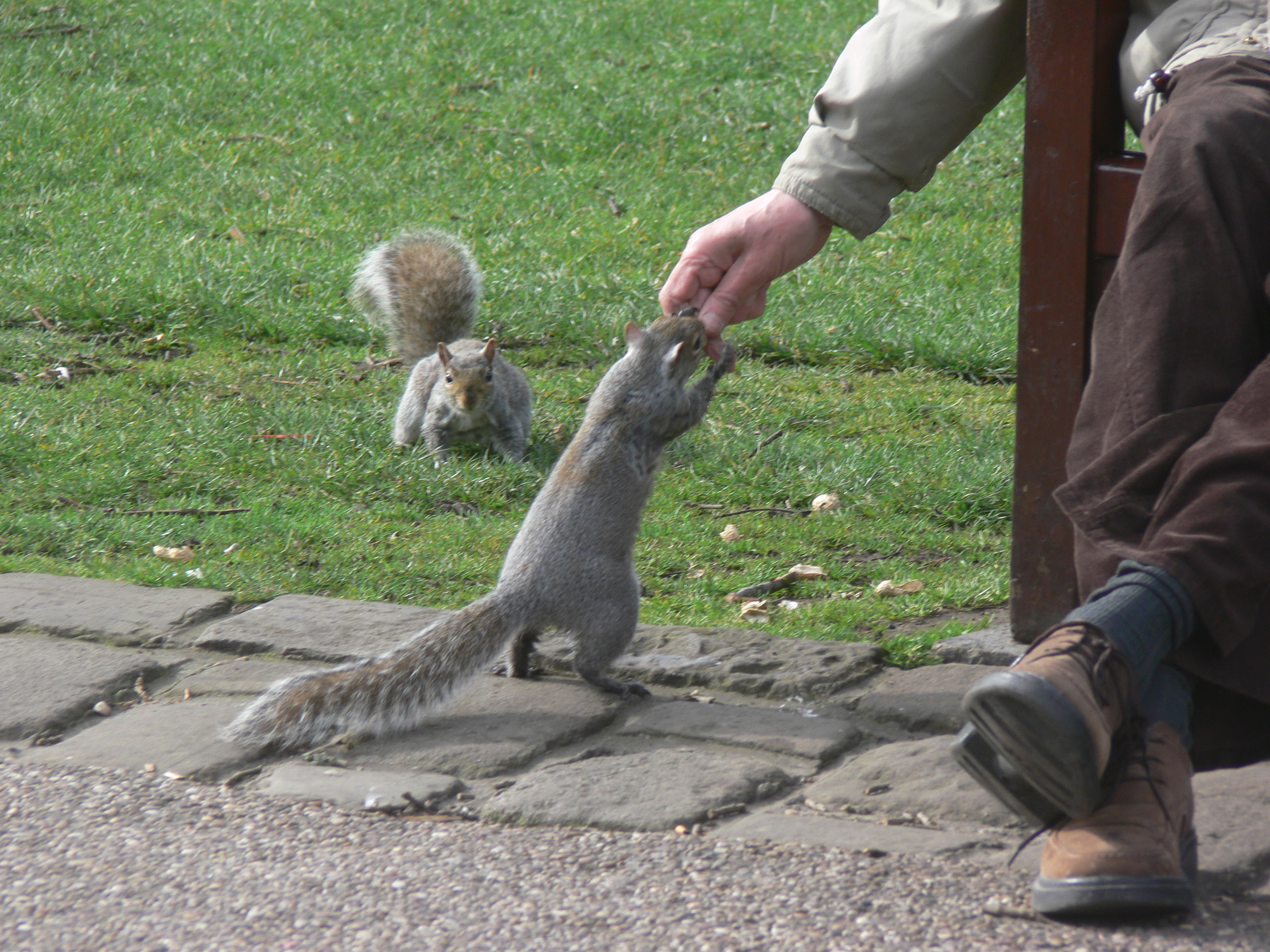
A garden visitor hand-feeding a grey squirrel

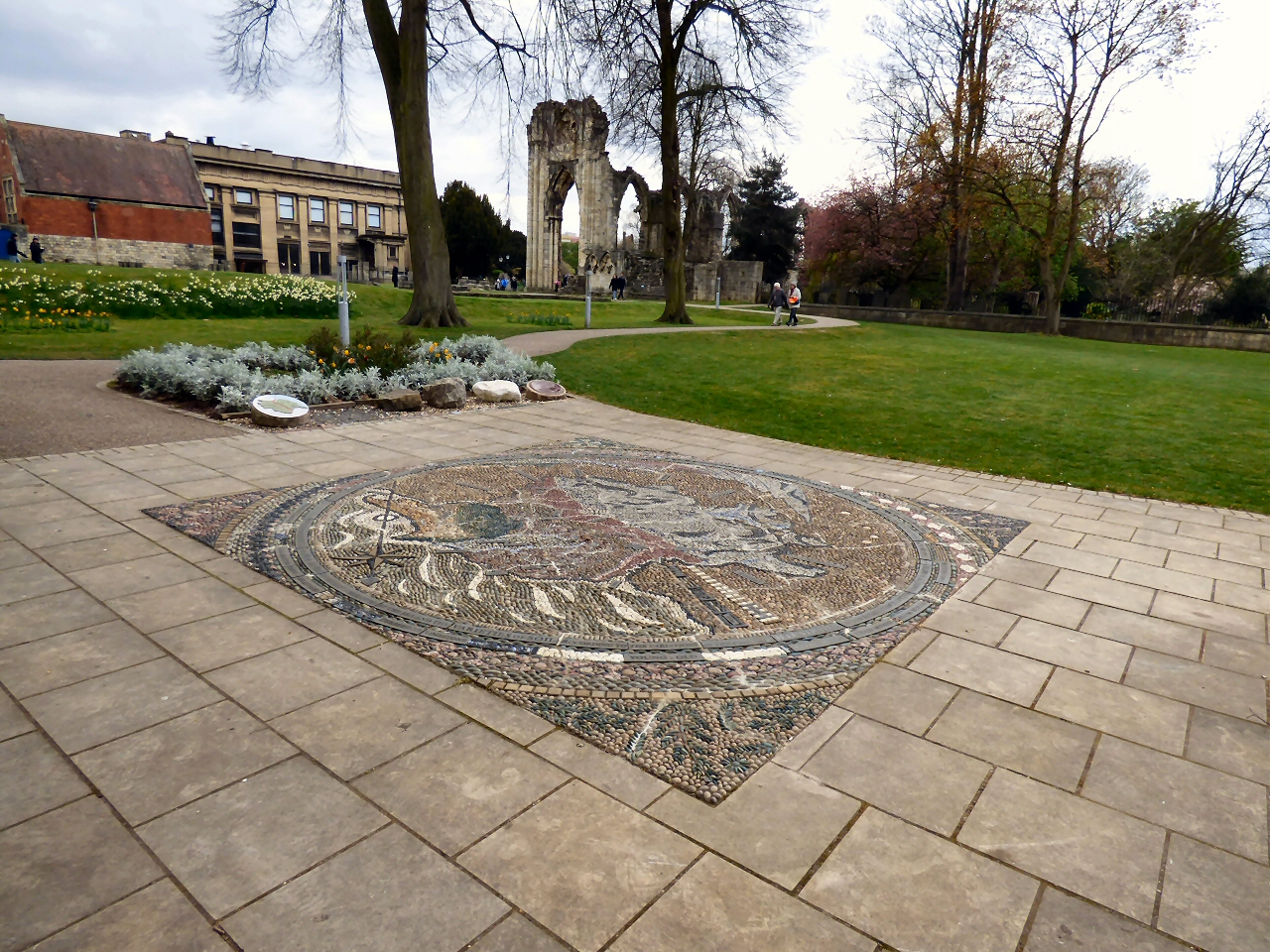
The geological mosaic map

== Events ==
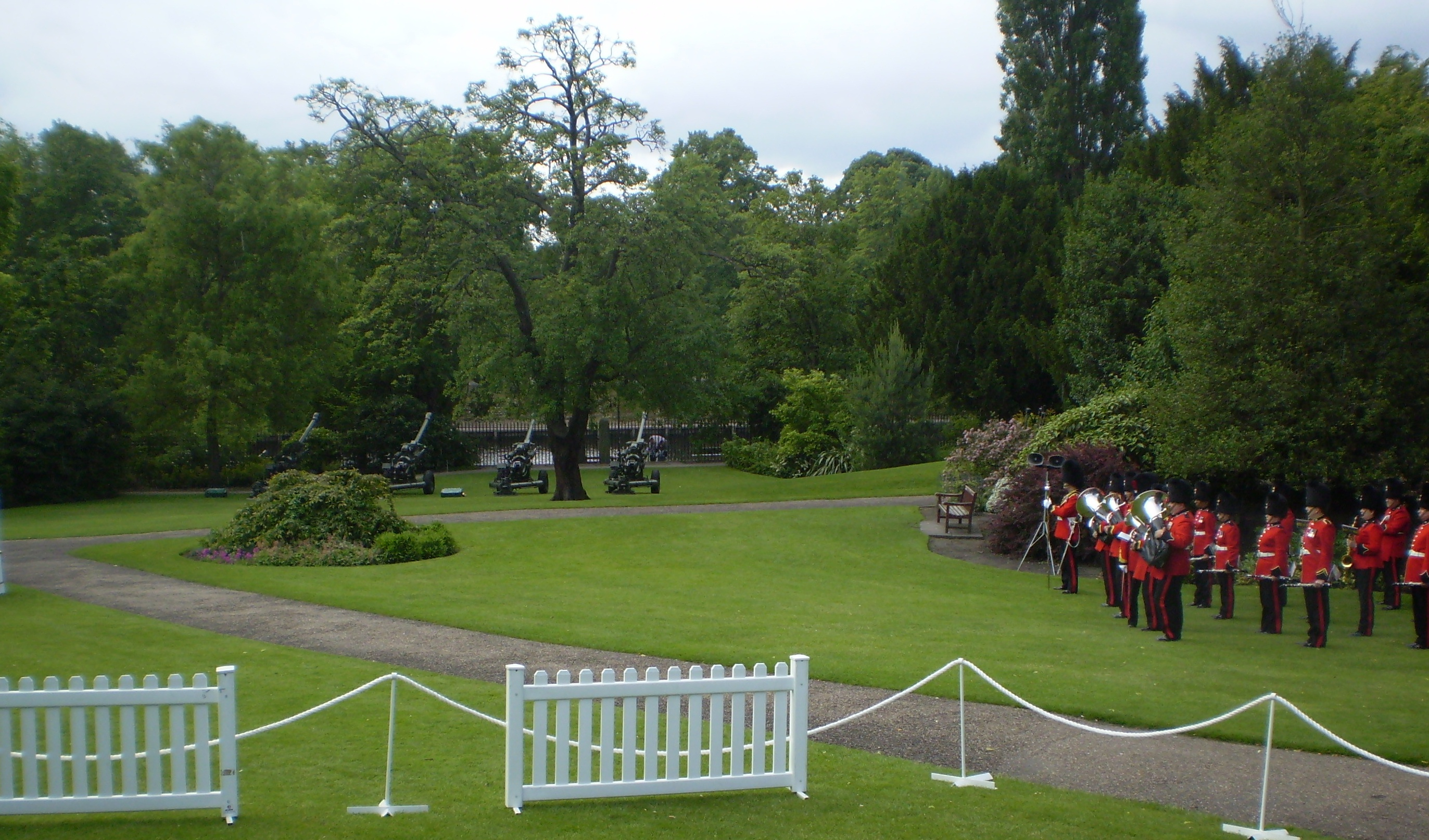
Saluting station in the Gardens

As well as being a popular recreational space for both residents and visitors, the gardens are the venue for special events such as open-air theatre and music performances. In 1970, bands including Roxy Music, Hawkwind and Pink Fairies staged concerts here. During the 20th-century revival of the York Mystery Plays, performances were held on a fixed stage in the gardens among the ruins of St. Mary's Abbey. In the 1950s, York actress Dame Judi Dench acted in the plays performed in the gardens, and played the Virgin Mary in 1957. The Mystery Plays returned to the gardens between 2–27 August 2012 and involved over one thousand local volunteers. In 2006, between 800 and 1,000 people celebrated the Chinese New Year with displays that included lion dancers. In 2007 The Lord Chamberlain's Men presented a production of Romeo & Juliet. Also in 2007, during the Jorvik Viking festival, there were demonstrations of Viking craft skills and battle training. The Yorkshire Museum and the Museum Gardens first hosted the Eboracum Roman Festival in 2016. It has since become an annual event. In 2019 the gardens hosted the York Proms, an open-air classical music concert. In July 2024 the gardens hosted a series of gigs headlined by Shed Seven.

=== Saluting station ===
The gardens are the location of York's Saluting Station, one of only 12 in the United Kingdom, with 21-gun salutes being fired at noon to celebrate occasions related to the British Royal Family throughout the year. At these times a military band marches to the gardens before the salute is fired. On 9 September 2022 a 96-gun salute was held in commemoration of the death of Queen Elizabeth II, one for each year of her life. This was followed, on 10 September by a 21-gun salute to mark the Proclamation of accession of Charles III.

=== Exhibitions ===
There is a designated 'Artist's Garden' behind the Art Gallery, within the Museum Gardens. Sculptural works are displayed in this open air space. Exhibitions in this space have included:

- Foundation Myths by Charles Holland (2016–2017) was the first exhibition in the Artist's Garden.
- Leisureland Golf by Doug Fishbourne (June–September 2017) was a fully playable crazy-golf course and sculptural installation.
- The Pollinarium (27 September – 6 October 2018) was a timber structure, covered with flowering plants and shown as part of the York Mediale.
- Michael Lyons: Ancient and Modern (25 May 2019 – May 2020) is a series of sculptures by Michael Lyons. It is the first time such a large exhibition of outdoor sculpture has been displayed in York.
- Ghosts in the Garden (23 September – 7 November 2022) is a series of wire-mesh sculptures of historical figures on display throughout the Artist's garden and Museum Gardens as well as at the Treasurer's House, York, Merchant Adventurers' Hall, Barley Hall, and St Anthony's Garden.

== Buildings ==
=== Roman ===
The Multangular Tower and Roman Wall

In the northeast of Museum Gardens there are remains of the west corner of the fortifications that surrounded the Roman fort of Eboracum. The original defences, consisting of turf ramparts on a green wood foundation, were built by the Ninth Legion between 71 and 74 AD. Later those were replaced by a clay mound with a turf front on a new oak foundation, and eventually wooden battlements were added, which were then replaced by limestone walls and towers. These stone defences are some of the few Roman remains that are visible above ground in York.

The Multangular Tower is the western corner tower of the Roman fortress, and consists of both Roman and medieval architecture. The tower has 10 sides, from which it derives its modern name "multangular", and is 19 feet (5.8 m) high. It was built in its late Roman form during the early 4th century, when it was constructed with three floors to house a catapult. Five Roman stone coffins are in the Multangular Tower, which were brought from graveyards in other areas of York.

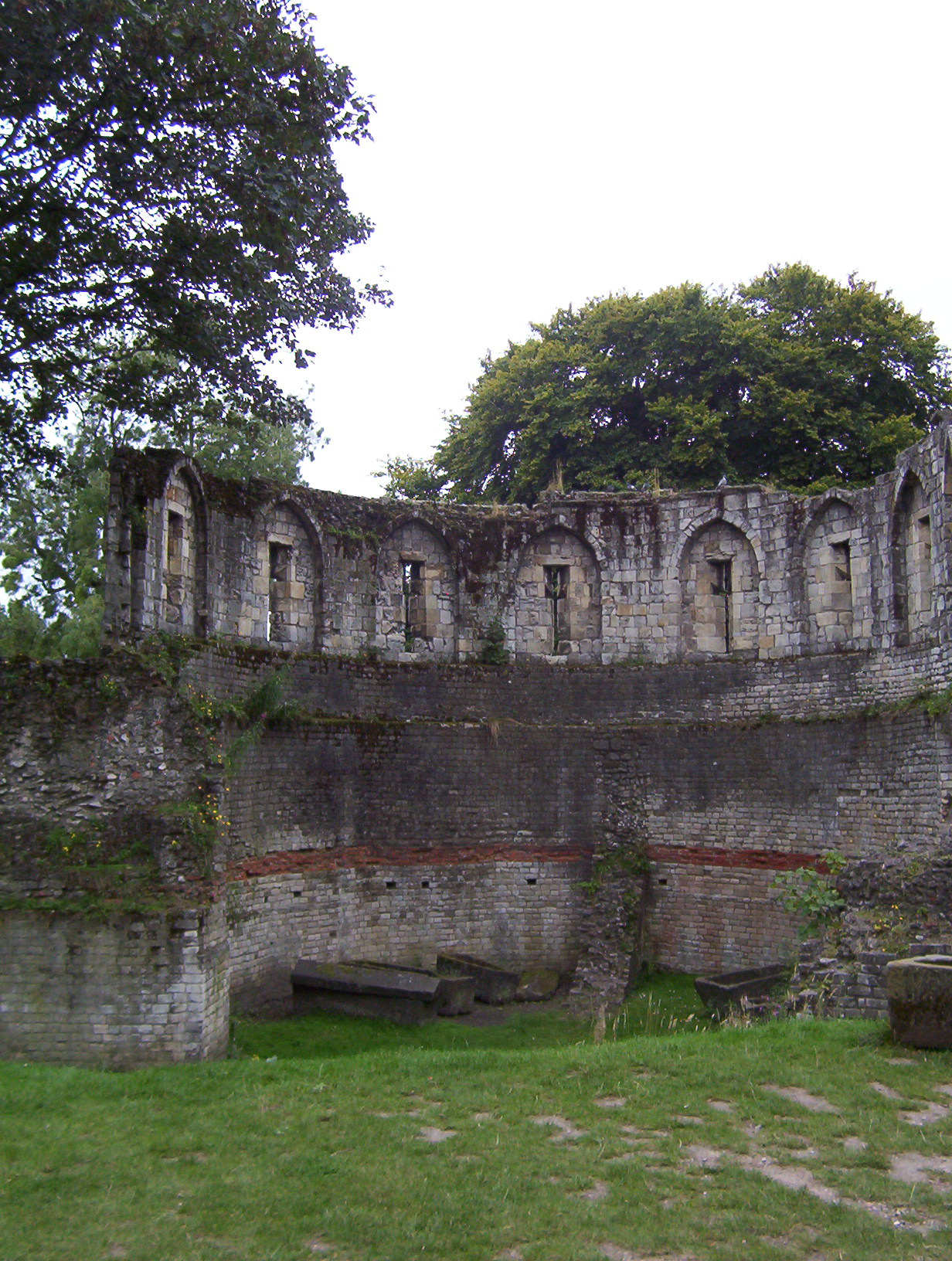
The inside of the Multangular Tower

A 76-foot (23 m) section of 4th-century wall connects the Multangular Tower to a small interval tower. The side of the wall and towers facing into Museum Gardens is carefully faced in stone, as during the Roman period it was on display. The other side is rougher because it was originally covered by an earth bank. The wall and towers were still in use after the end of the Roman period in Britain, and were subsequently incorporated into the medieval city walls. As late as the English Civil War they were being used to defend the city, and there is a hole in the wall along from the Multangular Tower that was made by a cannonball during this period. The Roman parts of the wall and towers are constructed of regular rectangular limestone blocks with a band of red tile running through them. The later medieval additions can be identified by the use of much larger blocks of limestone that cut through the red tiles in places and by the cross shaped arrow slits on the Multangular Tower.

To the north of the Multangular Tower there is a stretch of the medieval city wall with the remains of the original Roman wall running parallel to it on the city side. Built into this part of the wall is the stone Anglian Tower, which was once thought to have been built during the reign of Edwin of Northumbria, but now is generally thought to be of the very late Roman period. Behind the Anglian Tower are a series of banks showing the level of the defences during the Roman, early Middle Ages, Norman, and late medieval periods.

=== Medieval ===
Ruins of St Mary's Abbey church, York

The gardens contain several buildings dating back to the medieval period, most of them relating to St Mary's Abbey. The Benedictine Abbey's origins date back to 1086 when Alan Count of Brittany granted St Olave's Church and the adjoining land to the monk Stephen of Whitby, who became the first abbot of St. Mary's. When St Olave's Church became too small, a larger church in a Romanesque style was built nearby, the foundation stone of which was laid in 1089 by William II. This was replaced between 1270 and 1279 by a church in a Gothic style. The abbey became the wealthiest monastery in the North of England, worth over £2,085 a year before it was dissolved by Henry VIII on 25 November 1539. Over the next 200 years the abbey fell into disrepair and the abbey church was largely dismantled for its stone.

Stones from the abbey church can be seen lining paths throughout the gardens, but the major ruins of the church are on the western side. The church was aligned on a northeast axis because of the shape and size of the site, instead of pointing to the east, the normal alignment for churches in England. Part of the north and west walls that formed the nave and crossing, designed in Gothic style by architect Simon of Pabenham in the 13th century, remain standing. The ruins include dummy lancet windows, tracery windows and "tracery remains to show that the patterns alternated between a single large circle over two lights and three small circles over three lights". The column capitals are decorated with foliage in a stiff-leaf style as well as in a naturalistic style, although this stonework is weatherworn and so this decoration is hard to distinguish. Sections of the foundations of the church and its Norman predecessor are exposed, and a plan of their layouts can be seen in the grass. Finds excavated from the site, including life-sized statues of Christian saints, can be seen in the Yorkshire Museum.

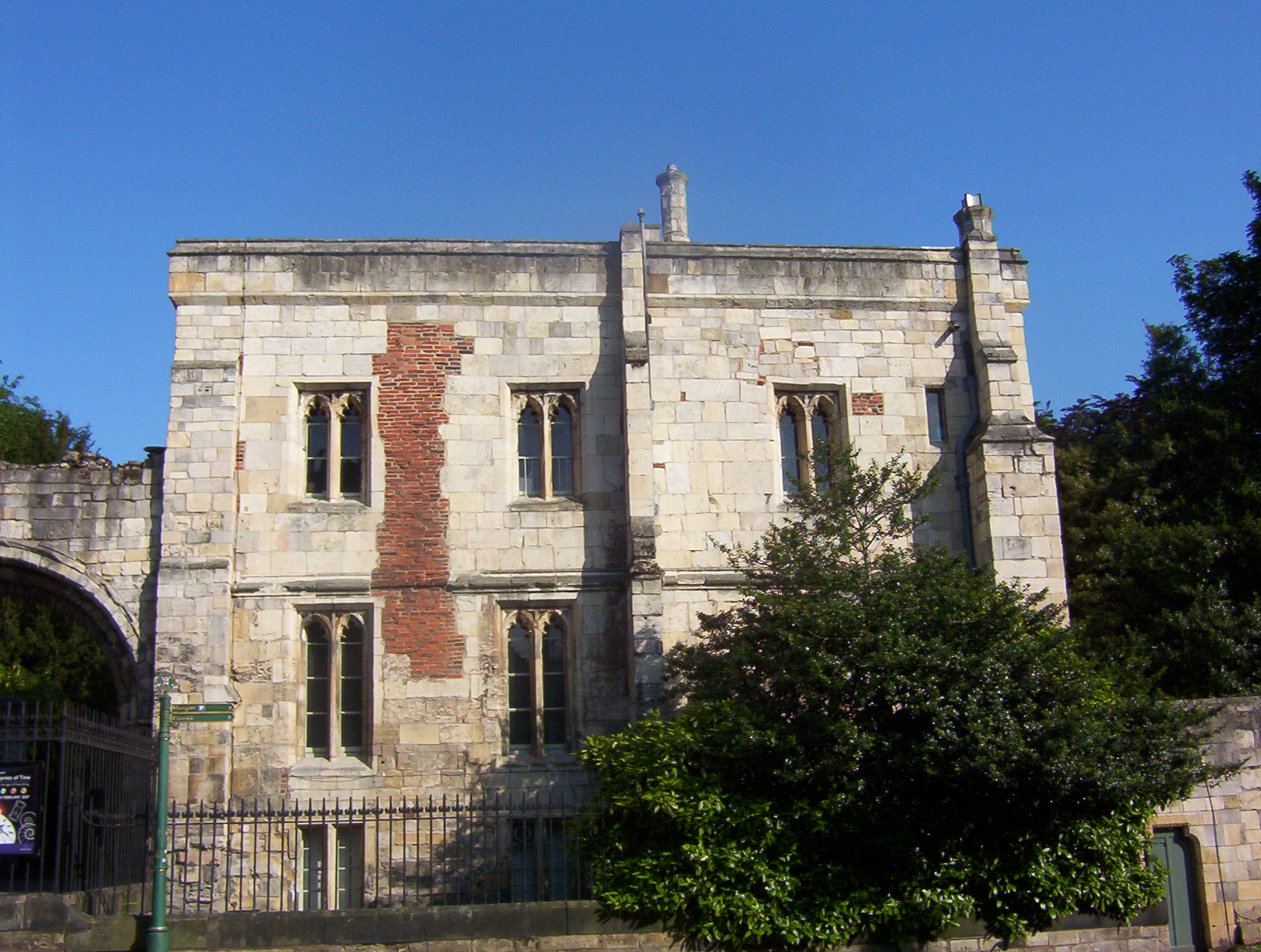
St Mary's Lodge as seen from Marygate

St Mary's Lodge was built around 1470 as an addition to the late 12th-century buildings that formed the gatehouse at the main entrance to the abbey, – now the Marygate entrance to the gardens. Some remains of the 12th-century gatehouse can still be seen, in particular the archway attached to the side of the lodge. The lodge is built of stone, and does not contain timber framing like the nearby Hospitium. The lodge, along with the attached railings, gates and gate piers are all Grade I listed buildings, which means that they are of outstanding interest. Originally, the lodge may have been used as a guesthouse for the abbey, and was the point where the poor could claim alms from the abbey. After the abbey's dissolution, the lodge became a courthouse until 1722, when part of the building became the Brown Cow pub. In 1840 John Philips, the Yorkshire Museum's curator, restored and converted it to use as his home while retaining its external appearance. The lodge subsequently became used as offices, and during the early 21st century became the headquarters of the York Museums Trust.

The Hospitium

Along with the lodge, some of the abbey's precinct walls are still standing. A section of the remaining walls runs along the north-west part of the gardens and extends further along Marygate to Bootham. The walls were constructed in 1266 and increased in height and crenellated in 1318 under a royal licence from Edward III. Originally there was a defensive ditch along the outside of the walls. The walls include several towers, not all of them dating from the medieval period; the semicircular tower near the gatehouse is a 19th-century reconstruction. The walls and towers were used for the abbey's defence, e.g. in disputes with the City of York over land ownership and taxes, and played a role in the defence of the city during the siege of York.

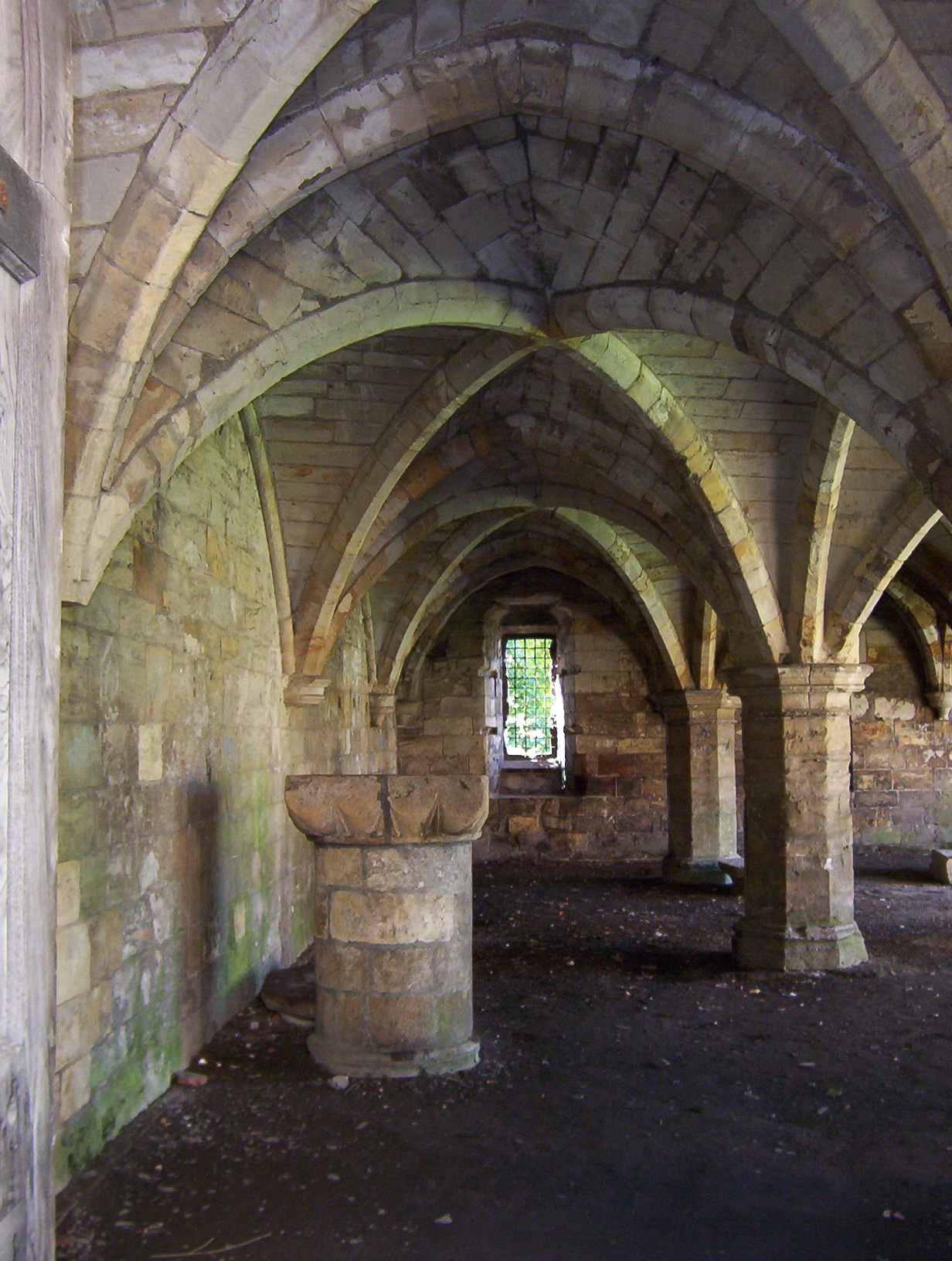
St Leonard's Hospital Undercroft

The Hospitium is located between the ruins of St Mary's Abbey Church and the River Ouse, and is thought to have originally been a guest house for visitors to the abbey of low social rank, or possibly a barn. It was originally part of a group of buildings in the abbey grounds that included a brew-house, stables, mill and, near the main gate, a boarding school with 50 pupils. The oldest parts of the ground floor were built around 1300, but the upper storey has been extensively restored in modern times. The ruined gateway at the side dates back to the 15th century, and was probably the entrance to a passage that ran towards the water-gate by the river.

The remains of St. Leonard's Hospital chapel and undercroft are on the east side of the gardens, by the Museum Street entrance. The hospital was the largest in England during the Middle Ages, and was run by a community of men and women of the Augustinian order. During the 14th century, the hospital could have contained as many as 240 patients, 18 clergy and 30 choristers. St. Leonard's Hospital was closed during the dissolution of the monasteries, when it was surrendered to Henry VIII by Thomas Magnus. The undercroft and chapel were part of the infirmary built between 1225 and 1250. The interior of the undercroft, accessible from the gardens, has a rib vaulted ceiling and houses a collection of Roman and medieval stonework. In 1999, the hospital and surrounding area in Museum Gardens was one of three sites in York to feature in a live edition of the British Channel 4 television show Time Team.

Between the Museum Street entrance to the gardens and the River Ouse is a short stretch of York's city walls, which ends at the medieval Lendal Tower.

=== 19th and 20th century ===
The entrance to the Yorkshire Museum

William Hincks was instrumental in establishing the gardens. Henry John Wilkinson reports as follows: "Mr. Hincks was lecturer on botany at the York School of Medicine, and the services he rendered to the Yorkshire Philosophical Society for over ten years deserve our grateful thanks. He devoted his leisure time to convert the " waste land " into a botanical and ornamental* garden, and in this work he was ably assisted by the late sub-curator, Henry Baines. "

The Yorkshire Philosophical Society constructed several buildings in the gardens during the 19th and early 20th centuries, including the Yorkshire Museum, one of the first purpose-built museums in Britain. The Yorkshire Museum was designed by architect William Wilkins in a Greek Revival style and was officially opened in February 1830. On 26 September 1831 the inaugural meeting of the British Association for the Advancement of Science was held at the Yorkshire Museum. Three of the museum's permanent collections are housed in the Yorkshire Museum building all of which have English designated collection status, which means they are "pre-eminent collections of national and international importance". The biology collection contains 200,000 specimens, including both fauna and flora, with most of the collection made up of insects. There are two stuffed specimens of the extinct great auk, an almost complete skeleton of an extinct moa and a large collection of specimens from the Yorkshire region including the remains of elephants, cave bears and hyena from Kirkdale Cave dated to the Quaternary period, around 125,000 years ago. The geological collection contains over 112,500 specimens of rocks, minerals and fossils. Fossils make up most of the collection numbering over 100,000 samples, and include important specimens from the Carboniferous, Mesozoic and Tertiary periods. The archaeology collection has close to a million objects that date from around 500,000 BC to the 20th century, including the Coppergate Helmet discovered in York in 1982, and the Ormside Bowl, an intricate example of an Anglian silversmith.

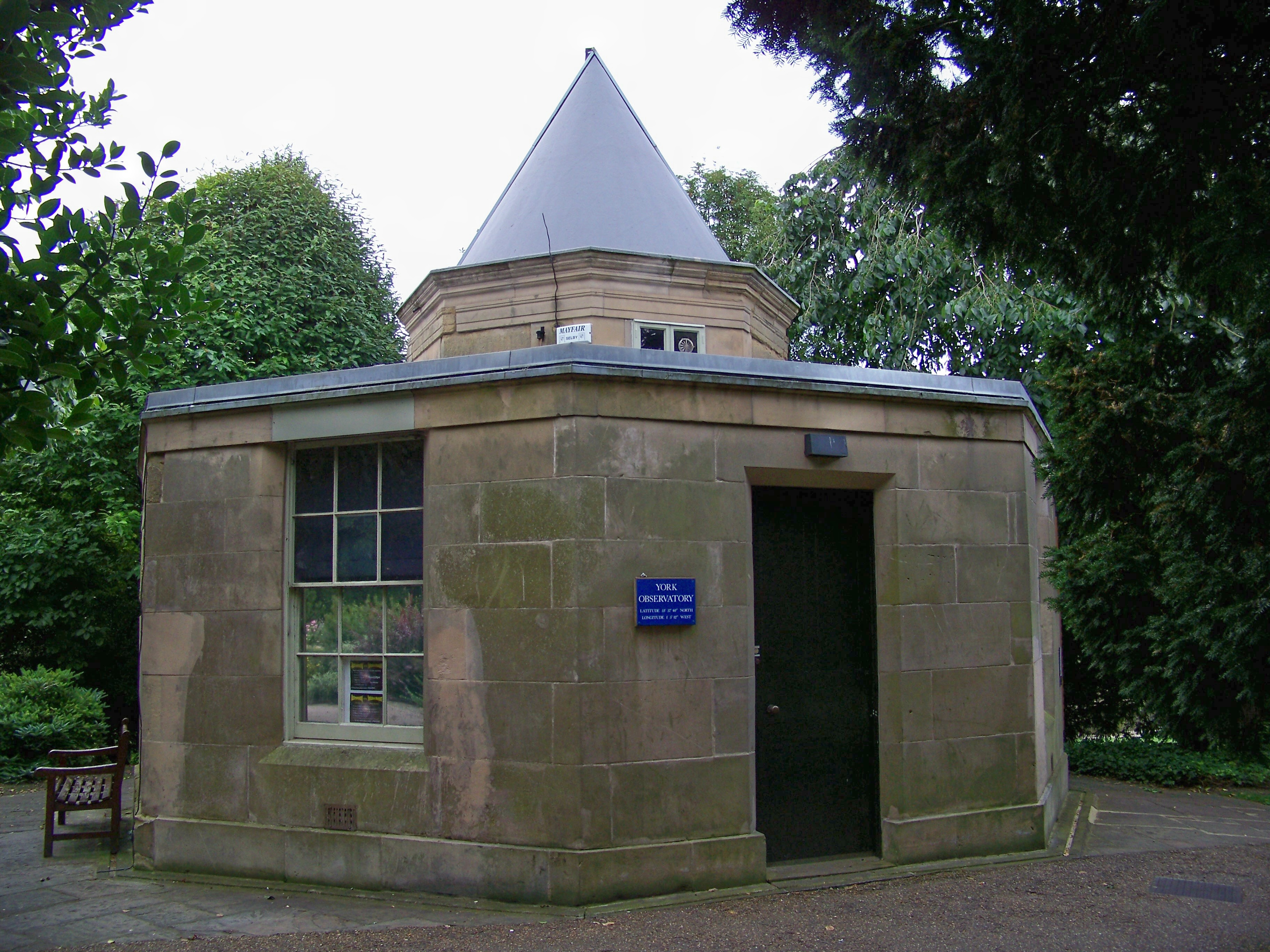
The Observatory

Most of the museum's astronomy collection is housed in the octagonal observatory in the centre of the gardens, built during 1832 and 1833. The design of its rotating roof is credited to John Smeaton designer of the Eddystone Lighthouse. A 4.5-inch (11 cm) telescope built in 1850 by the instrument maker Thomas Cooke of York was installed during the observatory's 1981 restoration. It is Yorkshire's oldest working observatory and as of August 2007 was opened to the public by a team of volunteers. The building is currently opened every Thursday and Saturday 11.30 until 2.30. The clock in the observatory was made by Barraud of London in 1811, and during the 19th century it was used to set the time for other clocks in York.

At the eastern, Museum Street, entrance to the gardens is Museum Gardens' Lodge built in 1874 to a design by George Fowler Jones in a Victorian Gothic Revival style. The lodge now houses the Yorkshire Philosophical Society's offices and reading room.

The curator's house ('Manor cottage'), built in 1844 and originally called the keeper's house, is located by King's Manor. It was designed by J. B. Atkinson and was built using reclaimed limestone from St. Mary's Abbey.

==== Tempest Anderson Hall ====
The Tempest Anderson Hall is a 300-seat auditorium-style lecture theatre built in 1912 as an annexe to the Yorkshire Museum. Dr Tempest Anderson, a York surgeon and vulcanologist, presented the hall to the Yorkshire Philosophical Society to replace its existing lecture theatre. Designed by E. Ridsdale Tate, it is an early example of the use of reinforced concrete and is a Grade I listed building. In the late 20th century it housed a cinema, but it is now used as a conference venue and lecture theatre.

=== Swimming baths ===
York's first swimming bath was located in the south-west corner of the Museum Gardens. It was an open-air pool designed by the architects Samuel and Richard Hey Sharp, one of the designers of the Yorkshire Museum, and measured 110 feet (34 m) by 80 feet (24 m) and had a capacity of approximately 290,000 gallons. It opened to the public on 8 August 1837, and employed a Keeper of the baths throughout its lifespan.

== Gallery ==
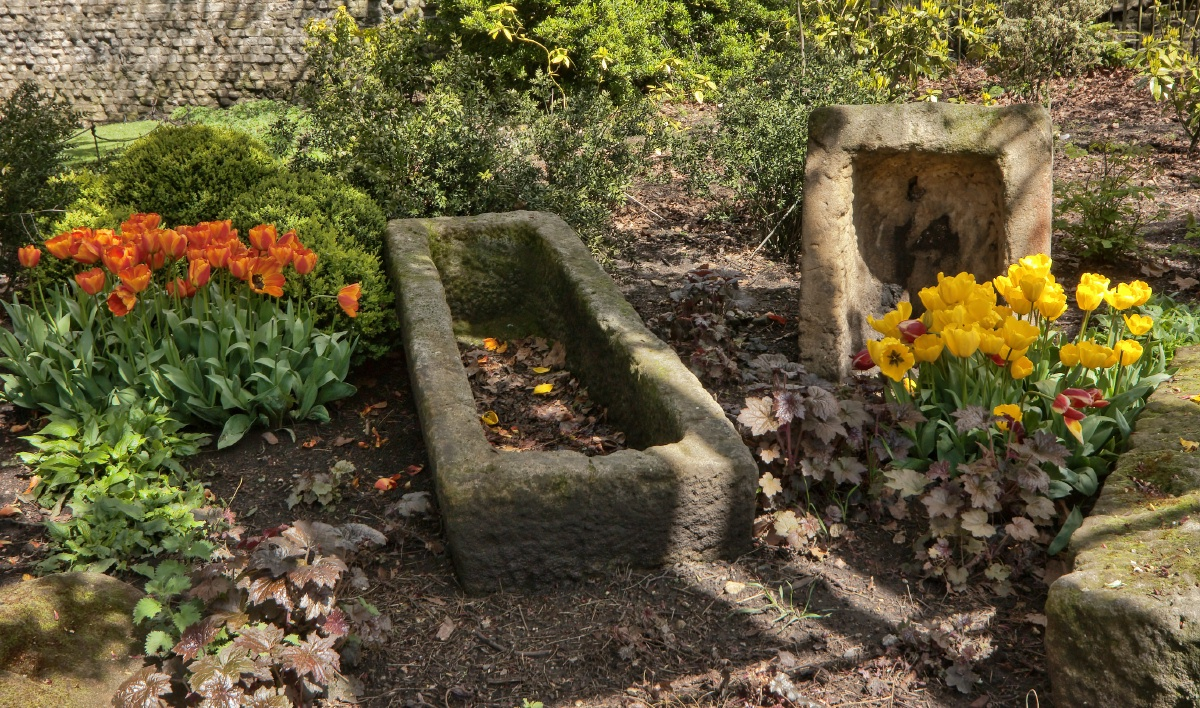

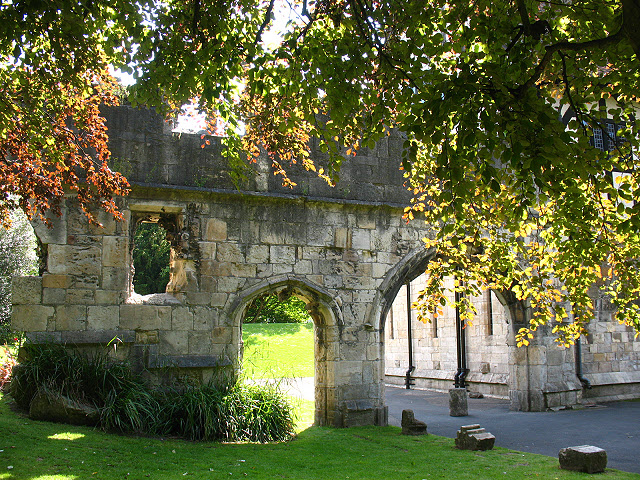

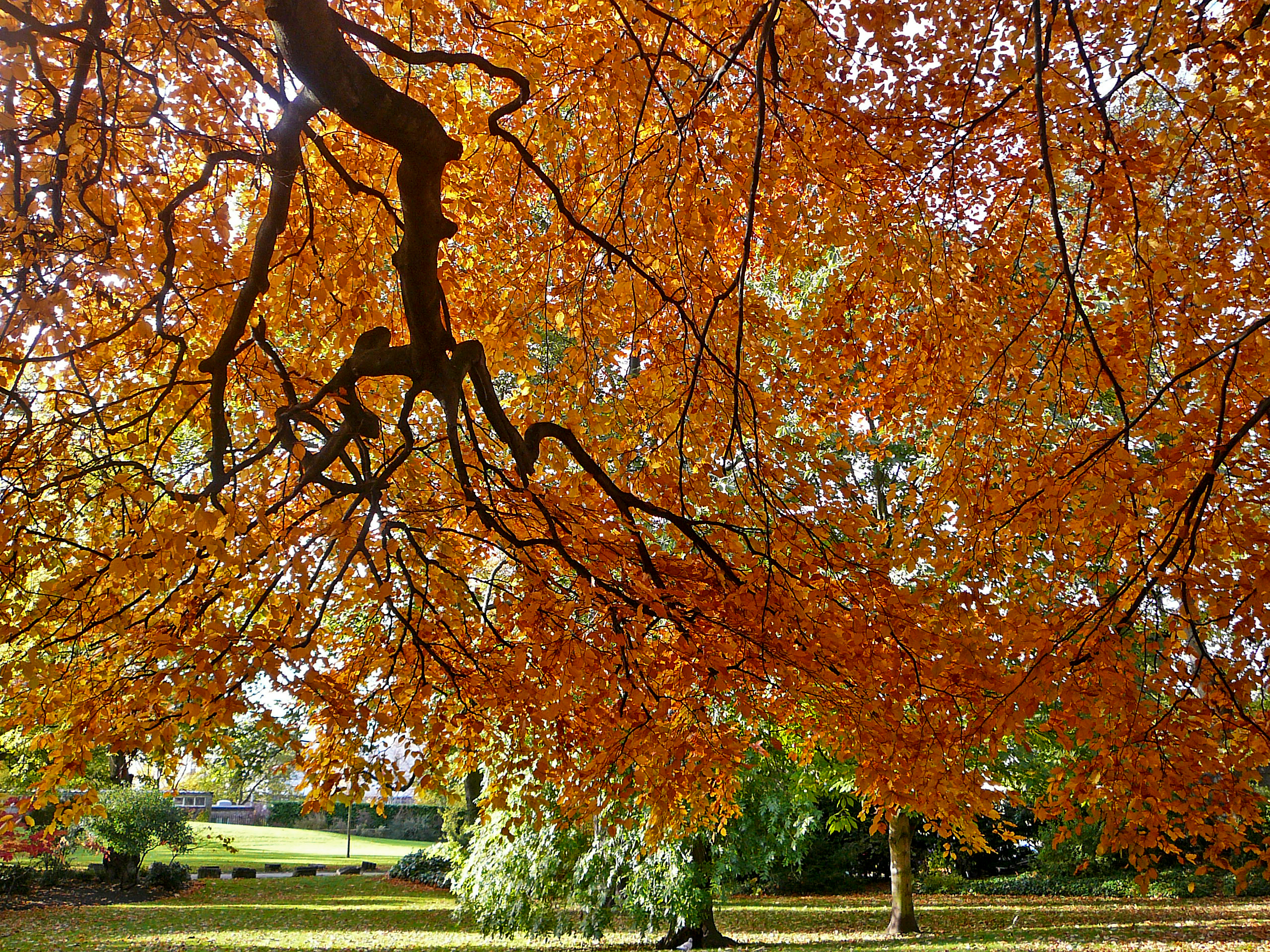

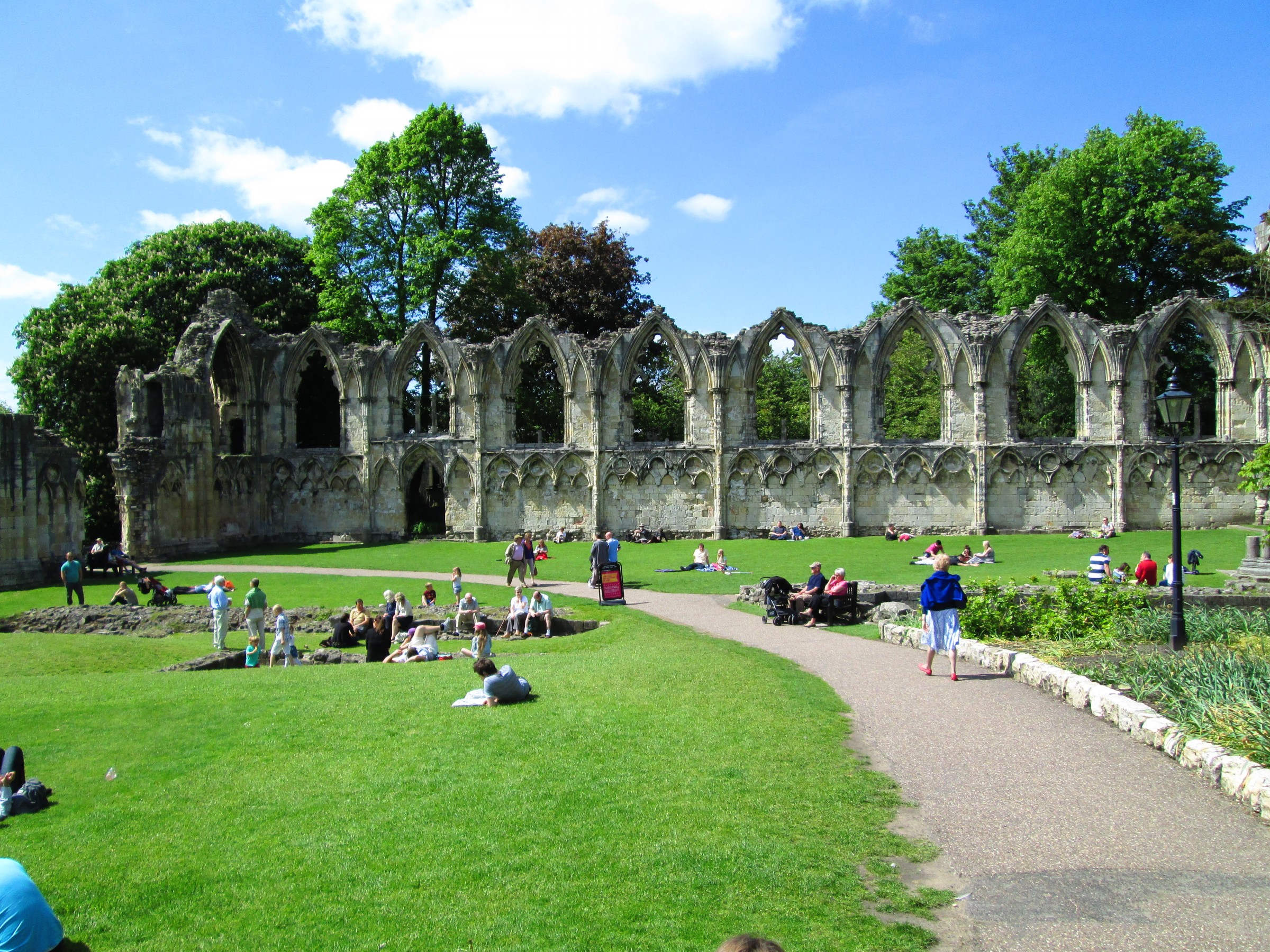

The Yorkshire Museum in the gardens

== See also ==
- Grade I listed buildings in the City of York
- History of York
- Listed buildings in York (outside the city walls, northern part)
- Listed buildings in York (within the city walls, northern part)
