= Gardenesque =

Landscape design theory

The term gardenesque was introduced by John Claudius Loudon (1783–1843) in 1832 to describe a style of planting design in accordance with his 'Principle of Recognition'.

== Definitions ==
Loudon was worried that picturesque planting could be mistaken for natural growth and argued that for a planting design to be recognizable as a work of art only exotic plants should be used. Later in his career Loudon accepted several other ways of making planting recognizable as art (1) by removing surrounding plants so that a perfect form of the plant was grown (2) by 'high keeping' (intensive maintenance) in a garden (3) by planting in geometrical beds. Though Loudon was clear about his reasons for introducing the gardenesque he gave varied accounts of how the principle could be satisfied. This has given the word a modern English usage which conforms with the etymology of the word ('like a garden') but differs from Loudon's uses of the word. The Oxford English Dictionary gives the following definitions:

Partaking of the character of a garden; somewhat resembling a garden or what belongs to a garden.

The OED then gives several quotes illustrating various usages of the term:

- 1838 Loudon. Arboretium Brit., The expression of gardenesque beauty, in individual trees differs from the picturesque, in being . . at all times regular or symmetrical
- 1839 — Repton's Landsc. Garden (1840) Introd. 8 This change has given rise to a school we call Gardenesque; the characteristic feature of which is the display of the beauty of trees, and other plants individually.
- 1880-1 Libr. Univ. Knowl. (N.Y.) XI. 306 [Boston Common 'public garden'] is kept in gardenesque style as an arboretum and botanical garden.
- 1881 Gard. Chron No. 417.816 An attempt to give a sort of gardenesque character to a slope within view of the Castle by planting dwarf hardy shrubs in a formal arrangement of beds.
- 1896 Punch 29 Aug. 100/2 No, by heavens, let the gardenesque perish Ere ever I axe that familiar old thorn!

== See also ==
- Planting design
- History of gardening
