= E. Ridsdale Tate =

British artist and architect (1862–1922)

Edwin Ridsdale Tate L.R.I.B.A (1862–1922) was a British antiquary, artist and architect based in York.

== Life ==
Tate was born in York, where his birth was registered in the Bootham sub-district. For a time, he worked for local architectural firm R. Gould and C. Fisher. Before returning to York, he also worked in London and Carlisle. In 1916, he married Mary Louise Elsworth Wray at Holy Trinity, Micklegate. He died in York, and his death was registered in the East York district.

== Architecture ==
The buildings for which Tate is best known are an anchorage attached to All Saints' Church, North Street, York (1910) and the Tempest Anderson Hall (1912). Both were built of reinforced concrete. Following the construction of the Tempest Anderson Hall he collaborated with Walter Harvey-Brook in founding and shaping the Museum of Medieval Architecture beneath it in 1912. He was a licentiate member of the Royal Institute of British Architects

== Panoramic drawings (1915) ==
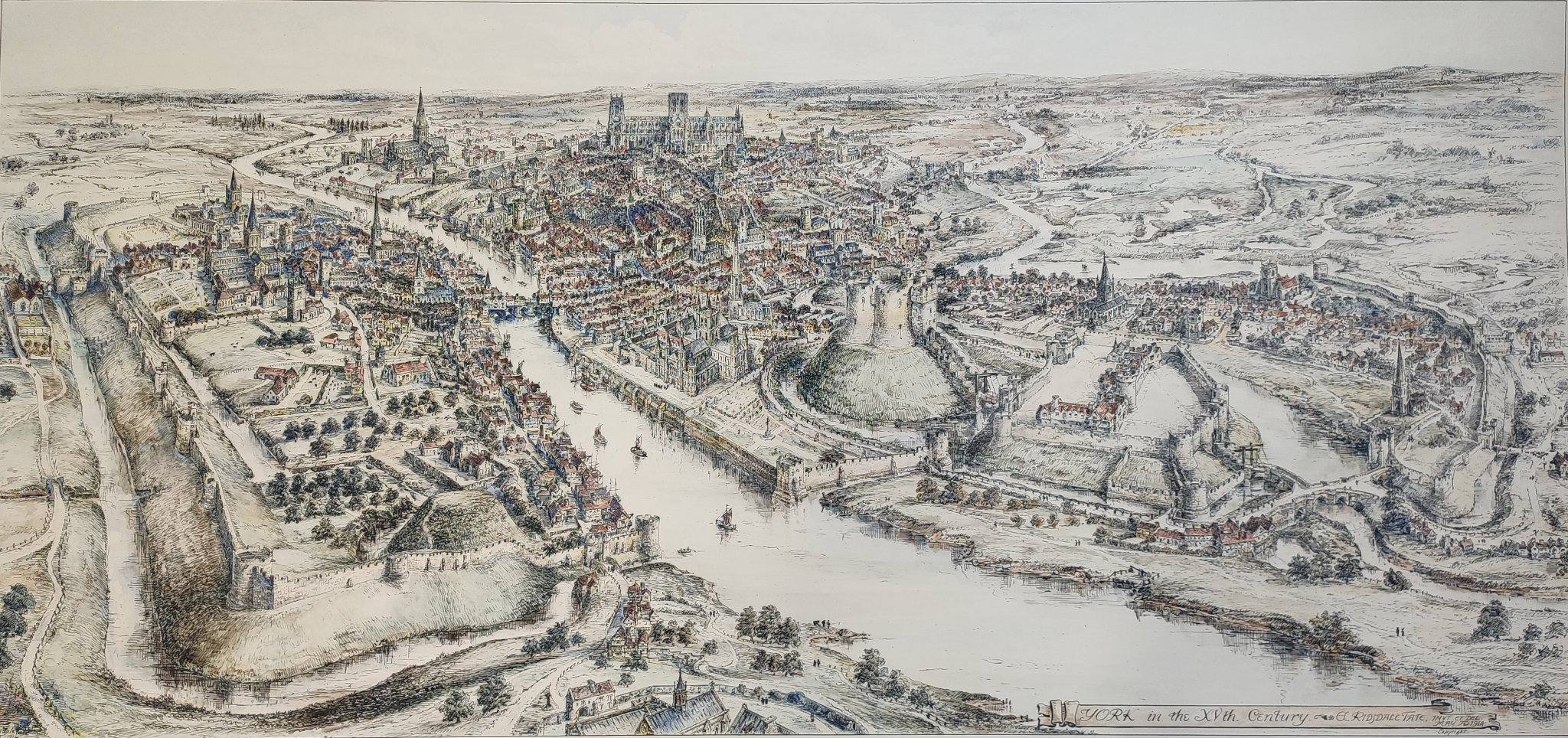
A panorama of 15th-century York by E. Ridsdale Tate.

In 1915 Tate was commissioned by David Leith Presley, editor of the York Herald newspaper, to draw a panoramic bird’s eye view of York as it looked in the 15th century. This was to celebrate the 20,000th copy of the York Gazette, and was published in that newspaper on 18 May 1915. Tate’s pen and ink drawing showed the city with its castle and water-filled moat, and more than 40 churches within the city walls, and captured something of what the city would have looked like during its medieval heyday, including

- Ouse Bridge: Apart from two ferries, the medieval Ouse Bridge was the only river crossing for many centuries. The bridge survived until 1809 when it was demolished to make way for a new bridge which is still in use in today. The old bridge had shops, houses and other establishments built upon it. These included the ancient Chapel of St. William, the Council Chamber, the City Gaol and a Public Convenience.
- The castle area, which shows Clifford's Tower.
- The Priory of the Holy Trinity, which was until the Reformation the second largest religious community in York, after the Abbey of St Mary,
- Baile Hill viewed from the Clementhorpe area.

Edwin Ridsdale Tate was asked to prepare sketches of educational institutions in York, including Elmfield College.

== Publications ==
- 1924. With Dickens in Yorkshire
- 1929. The Charm of St. Mary's Abbey and the Architectural Museum, York. York: Yorkshire Philosophical Society
