= Edward Charlesworth =

- Born: 5 September 1813; Clapham, Surrey, England
- Died: 28 July 1893 (aged 79)
- Occupation: palaeontologist

Edward Charlesworth (5 September 1813 – 28 July 1893) was an English geologist and palaeontologist.

Edward Charlesworth was the eldest son of the Rev John Charlesworth. He studied medicine but abandoned a career in this discipline in 1836 to work in the British Museum. He was interested in the Crag fossils of East Anglia and in the period 1835–1838 debated with Charles Lyell on the age and nature of the Crag formations. At this time he took over the Magazine of Natural History associated with William Bean. The Magazine of Natural History is, in contemporary scientific literature, often referred to as Charlesworth's Magazine.

Charlesworth was the second keeper of the Yorkshire Museum, from 1844–1858, following on from John Phillips and preceding Charles Wakefield (only in post for 6 months) and William Dallas.
