= Andrew Woods (archaeologist) =

British numismatist and museum curator

Andrew Woods FSA
- Occupations: Archaeologist; Numismatist; Museum Curator

Academic background
- Education: University of Cambridge
- Thesis: Economy and Authority: A study of the coinage of Hiberno-Scandinavian Dublin and Ireland (2013)

Academic work
- Discipline: Numismatics
- Institutions: Fitzwilliam Museum; Portable Antiquities Scheme; Yorkshire Museum (York Museums Trust)

Andrew R. Woods FSA is a British numismatist, archaeologist and curator specialising in early medieval and Viking coinage. He is the Head of Collections and Research at York Museums Trust.

== Education and career ==
Woods received a bachelor's degree in history from the University of Bristol in 2007. He also received a master's degree in medieval history from the University of St Andrews in 2008, and doctorate in archaeology from the University of Cambridge in 2013. His thesis was entitled Currency of the Ostmen: Money and Economy in Late Viking-Age Ireland and was supervised by Mark Blackburn and James Barrett. After completing his PhD, he worked as an assistant at the Fitzwilliam Museum. He also worked for the Portable Antiquities Scheme. He was appointed the curator of numismatics at the York Museums Trust in 2013 and is currently the senior curator of the Yorkshire Museum.

As a curator, Woods has helped acquire a number of treasure troves and hoards discovered in recent years, including the Wold Newton Hoard, the Overton Hoard, and a rare Anglo-Saxon gold shilling. He also arranged for the exhibition of the Vale of York Hoard.

Woods received the 2017 Blunt Prize from the British Numismatic Society. He was elected a Fellow of Society of Antiquaries of London on 6 June 2019.

== Select publications ==
- 2013. 'The coinage and economy of Hiberno-Scandinavian Dublin' in S. Duffy, Medieval Dublin XIII. Four Courts Press, 43-69.
- 2014. 'Monetary activity in Viking-Age Ireland: the evidence of the single-finds' in Allen, Naismith and Screen (eds.), Early Medieval Monetary History: Studies in honour of Mark Blackburn. Ashgate, 295-330.
- 2014. 'A case of modern imitation of a Hiberno-Scandinavian coin' in T. Abramson (ed.), Studies in Early Medieval Coinage 3, Spink, 159-61.
- 2016. 'Prelude to the Hiberno-Scandinavian coinage: the Castle and Werburgh Street hoards' In H. Clarke and R. Johnson (eds.), Before and after the Battle of Clontarf: the Vikings in Ireland and beyond. Four Courts Press.
- 2017. with R. Naismith, 'Ireland to 1170' in R. Naismith, Medieval European Coinage 8, 323-36.
- 2019. 'Royalty and Renewal in Viking Age Ireland' in J. Kershaw and G. Williams (eds.), Silver and other economies in the Viking Age. British Museum Press.
