= Ryedale Roman Bronzes =

Assemblage of Roman metalwork

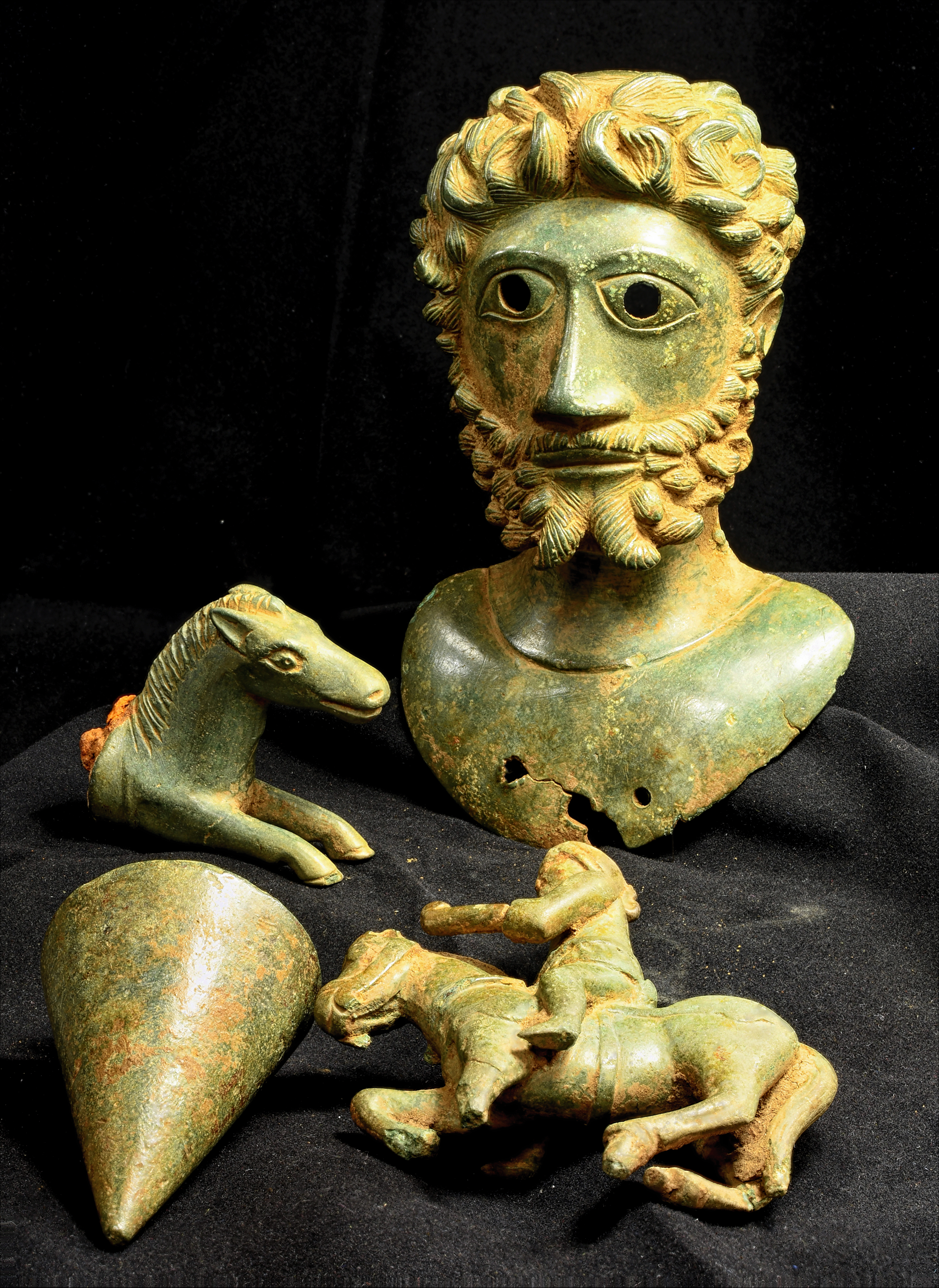
- Created: AD 150–410
- Period/culture: Roman
- Discovered: May 2020 near Ampleforth, North Yorkshire
- Present location: Yorkshire Museum, York

The Ryedale Roman Bronzes (also known as the Ryedale Hoard) is an assemblage of Roman metalwork.

== Discovery ==
The assemblage was found by metal detectorist Mark Didlick in a field near Ampleforth in Ryedale, North Yorkshire, in May 2020.

== Contents and significance ==
The assemblage comprises four pieces of metalwork, all of which are copper-alloys. They are: 1) a plumb bob, 2) a horse and rider figurine, 3) a figural horse head with an iron shank (probably a key), and 4) a figural bust (a sceptre head). The sceptre head is in the shape of an Emperor, probably Marcus Aurelius, and so dates to the late 2nd-century AD. In the Portable Antiquities Scheme record Dr John Pearce commented that the assemblage probably derived from a ritual context.

Dr Andrew Woods, senior curator at the Yorkshire Museum, has described the find as being of "national significance and great rarity."

In 2023, the Ryedale Hoard was mentioned as one of the finds that influenced the revision of to the definition of Treasure to extent to "finds of archaeological significance", in addition to gold and silver objects.

== Acquisition and public display ==
The assemblage comprised non-precious metals and so did not qualify as treasure under the terms of the Treasure Act 1996. It was placed on public display at Hansons Auctioneers in London on 28th April 2021. It was originally valued at between £70,000 and £90,000. In May 2021 it was sold in the private auction for £185,000. The Yorkshire Museum purchased the assemblage from David Aaron Ltd., who had originally bought it, with financial support from a private donor, Richard Beleson, the Art Fund and other private donors.

The artefacts were displayed at the Frieze Art Fair in London from 13 to 17 October 2021 before being added to the Yorkshire Museum's collection. In February 2022 it announced that the museum, which had been closed since November 2021, would reopen on 8 April 2022 with a new exhibition focussing on the hoard.
