= Head of Constantine the Great, York =

Part of a marble statue in York, England

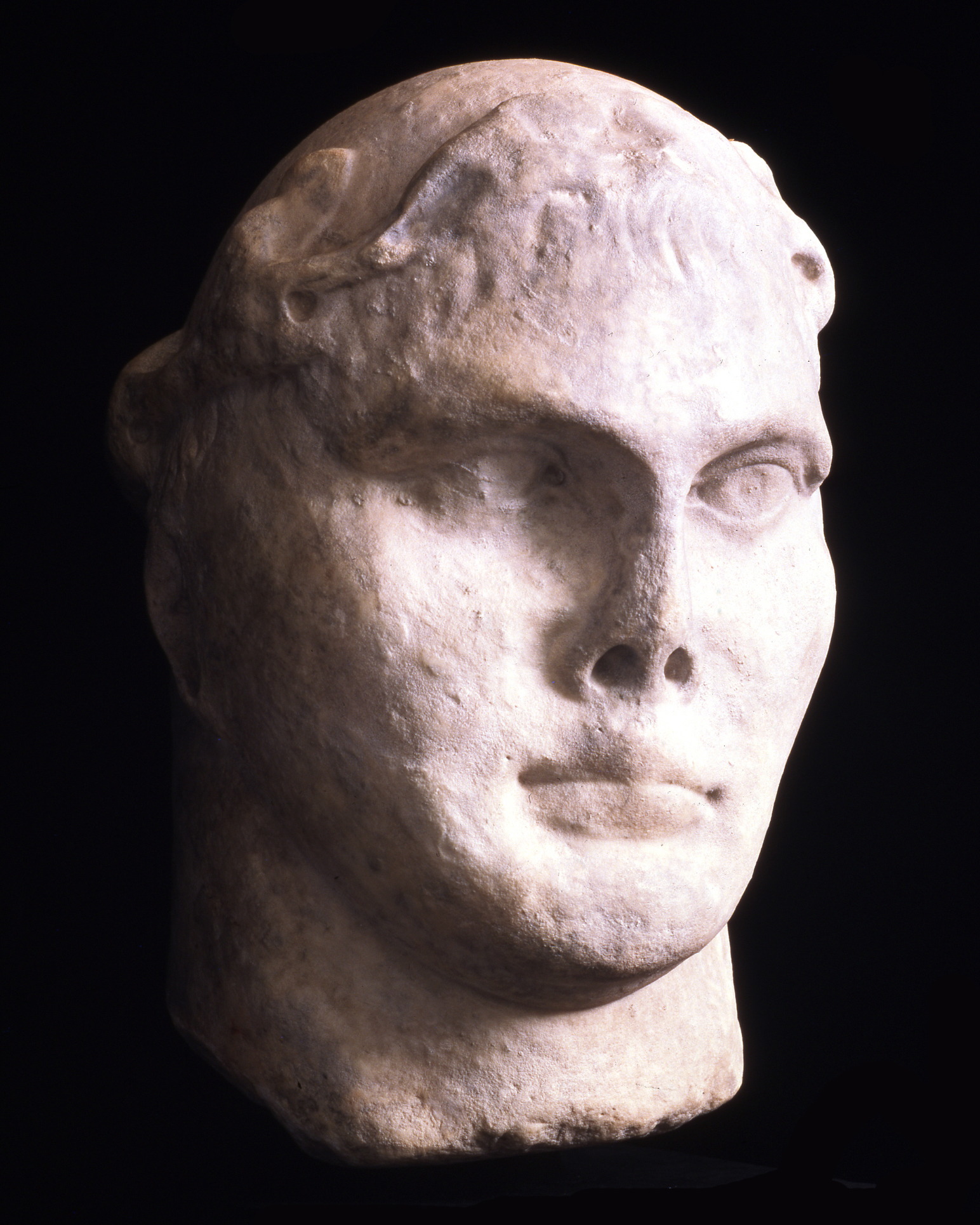
- Constantine the Great
- Material: Marble
- Size: 42cm high
- Created: Original c. 2nd century, remodelled in c. AD 306
- Period/culture: Roman
- Discovered: Before 1823; Stonegate, York, North Yorkshire
- Present location: Roman Gallery, Yorkshire Museum, York
- Identification: YORYM: 1998.23

The Head of Constantine the Great, York is the only surviving fragment of larger, marble statue of the Roman Emperor Constantine the Great. It was found in Stonegate, York, before 1823, and is now in the Yorkshire Museum.

== Discovery ==
The statue was presented to the museum of the Yorkshire Philosophical Society (latterly the Yorkshire Museum) in 1823 by James Atkinson, who had acquired the artefact following the excavation of 'a drain in Stonegate'. Stonegate is a medieval street in York which overlays the via praetoria of the Roman legionary fortress of Eboracum and it is possible that the complete statue originally stood within this area.

== Description ==
The head is a fragment of a larger, twice life sized, statue of the Emperor Constantine the Great. It stands to a height of 42 cm, and is 27 cm wide and 30 cm deep. It measures 17.5 cm in diameter at the base of the neck as it now survives. The face is clean shaven and he wears a corona civica. The axis of the neck suggests that the face had originally been turned slightly to the left and down towards an audience below.

Although the material was originally identified as Magnesian Limestone it has been subsequently re-identified as a coarse crystalline marble, of possible Italian origin.

== Significance ==
A 2018 paper argues that the bust was remodelled from a statue of an earlier, deified emperor, probably Hadrian. It argues, through a re-analysis of the image, especially the use of the corona civica, granted to Constantine only after the civil war in Italy against Maxentius had come to an end, that this recarving occurred after AD 312 and not, as widely believed, at the moment of Constantine's proclamation as emperor in York in AD 306.

== Public display ==
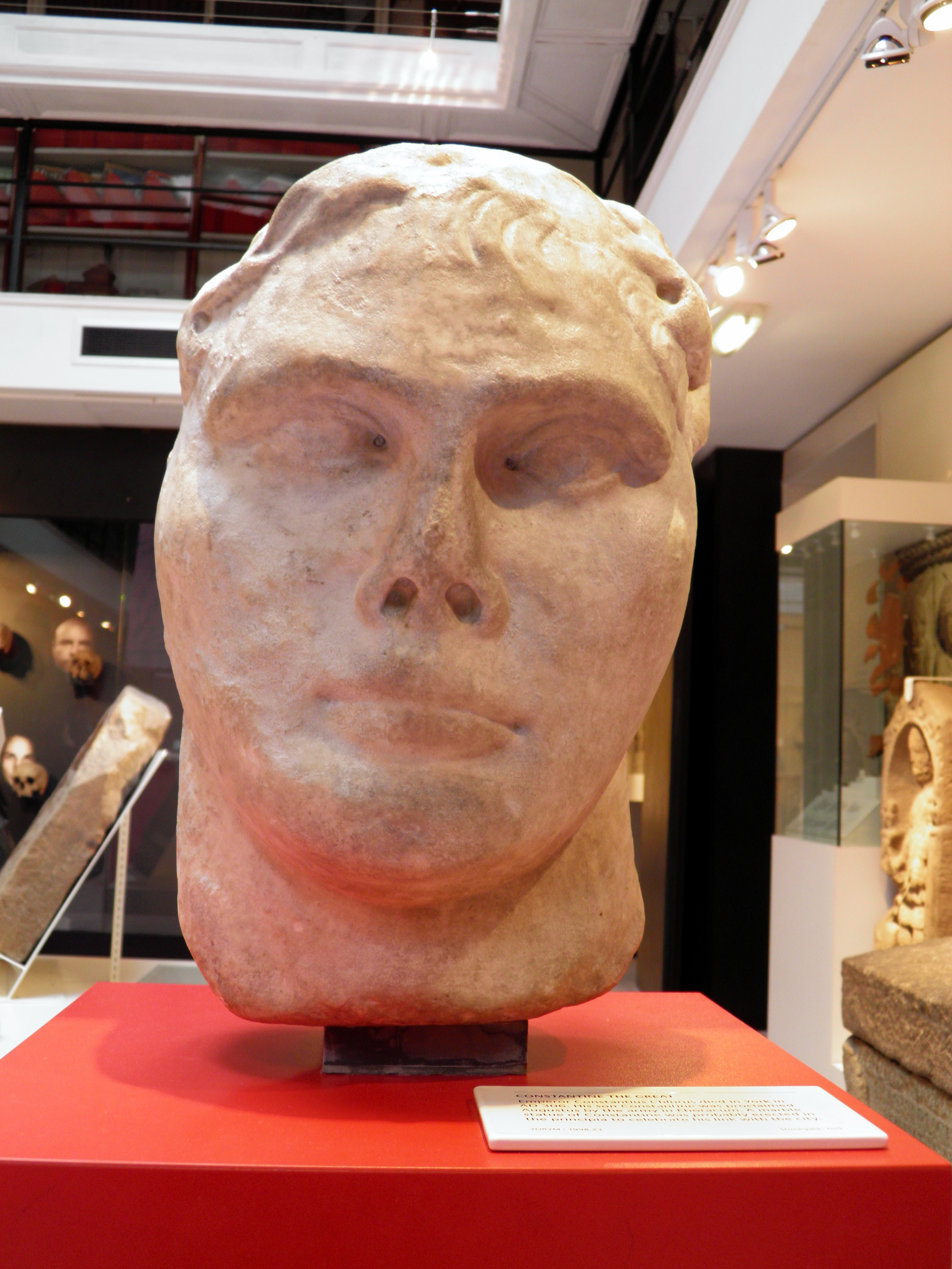
The head of Constantine on display in the Yorkshire Museum in 2012

The statue has formed part of the displays of the Yorkshire Museum since its opening in 1830.

The 2006 exhibition Constantine the Great: York's Roman Emperor, which featured the head as its central piece, was described as "the most important archaeological-historical loan exhibition to have been held in a provincial British museum". The curator Elizabeth Hartley was "the driving force" behind the exhibition, which attracted over 58,000 visitors.

In 2010 the Yorkshire Museum reopened after a twelve-month closure for redevelopment. The new exhibition, "Roman York - Meet the People of the Empire" features the head as a central piece of the display.

In 2013 the head was loaned to exhibitions in Milan and the Colosseum to mark the 1700th anniversary of the Edict of Milan, returning to York in September of that year.

From July to October 2016, the bust was featured in an exhibition about Constantine's father Constantius I titled "Constantius: York's Forgotten Emperor", which centred on the Wold Newton Hoard.

== See also ==
- Statue of Constantine the Great, York
- Colossus of Constantine
- Bosham Head of Trajan
