= Bootham Hoard =

Medieval coin hoard from York, England

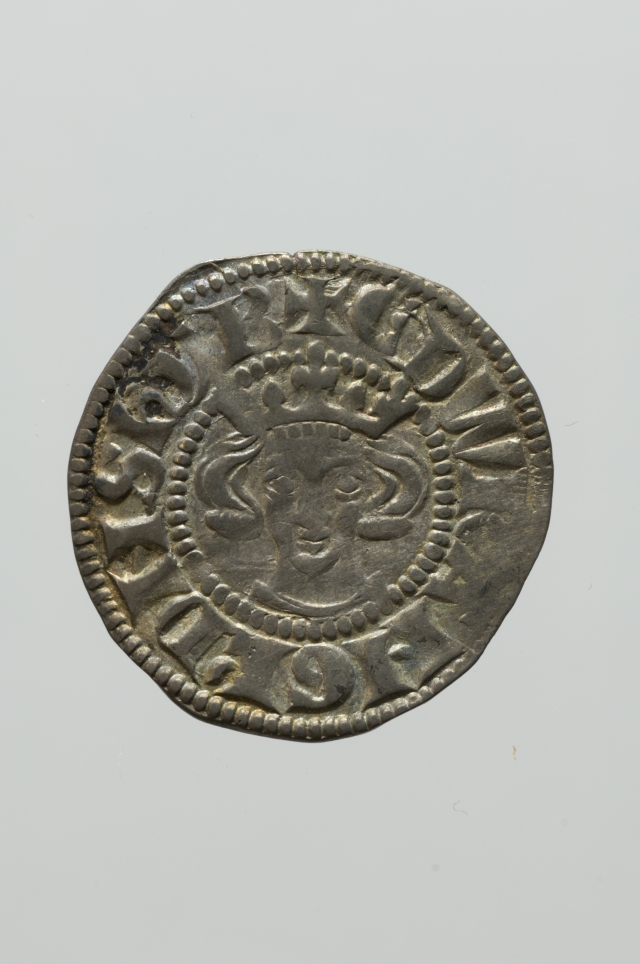
- Silver penny of Edward I in the Bootham Hoard
- Material: Silver bronze textile
- Created: 1326 (deposited)
- Period/culture: Medieval
- Discovered: 29 September 1953; Bootham School, Bootham, York, North Yorkshire
- Present location: Yorkshire Museum, York

The Bootham Hoard (also known as the Bootham School Hoard) is a hoard of coins found in a bronze vessel at Bootham School in York in 1953.

== Discovery ==
The hoard was discovered by workmen digging in the courtyard of Bootham School on 29 September 1953. They reported the find to George Willmot (Keeper of the Yorkshire Museum). The labourer, John Skaife, reported that he found the hoard at a depth of 7 feet (2.1 m) and the coins were wrapped in a piece of textile. An inquest in October declared the find to be a Treasure trove. The Yorkshire Museum purchased the hoard, with the exception of eight coins which were acquired by the British Museum.

== Contents ==
The hoard contained 908 coins. 839 were English silver pennies from the period AD 1251–1326, 16 were Irish coins, 40 Scottish, and 12 Continental.
