= St Mary's Abbey Figurine =

Medieval figure of Christ

St. Mary's Abbey Figurine
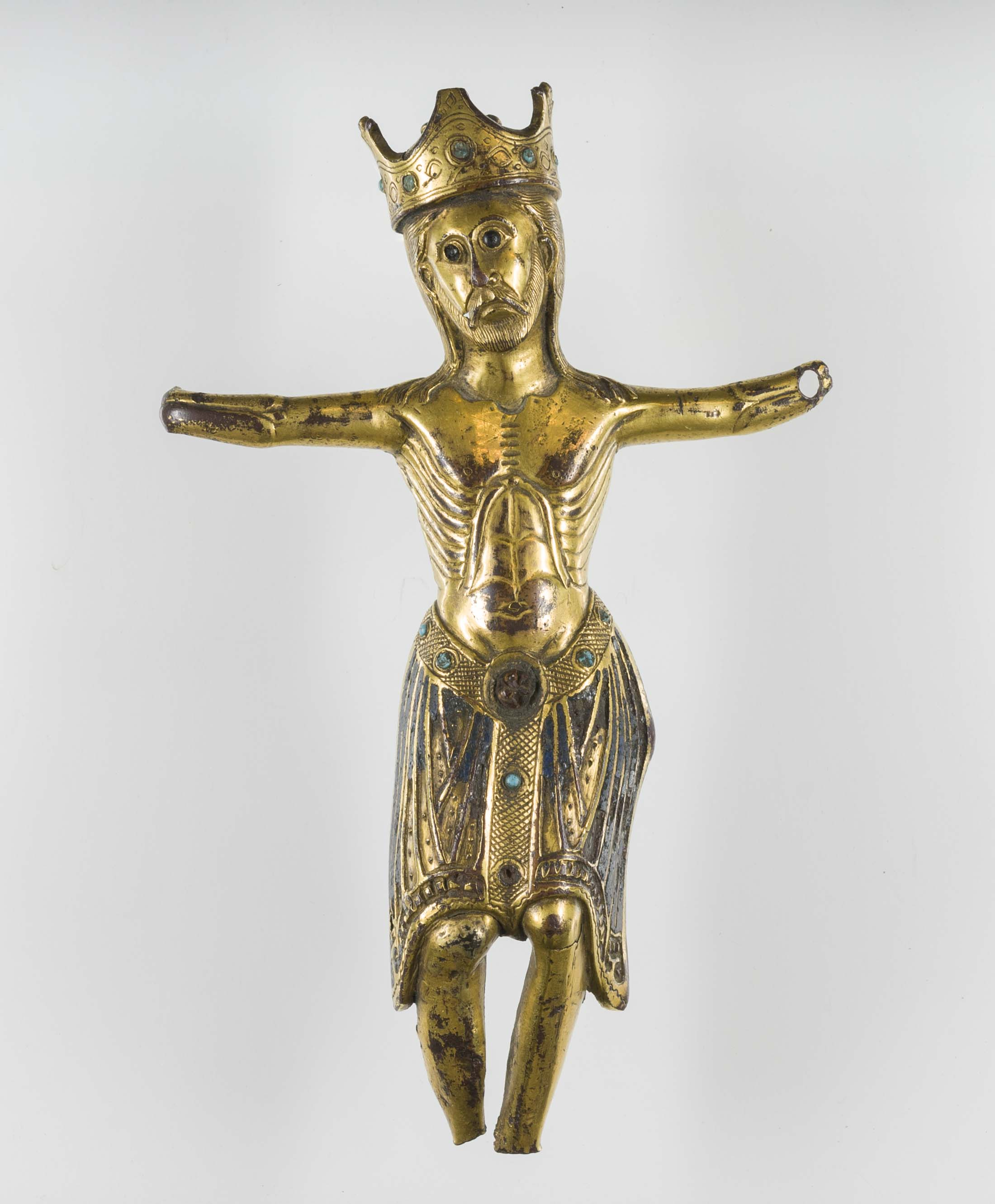
- Material: Gilded copper alloy, semi-precious stones, enamel.
- Period/culture: Medieval
- Discovered: 1826; St. Mary's Abbey, York
- Present location: Yorkshire Museum, York
- Identification: YORYM: 2019.77

The St. Mary's Abbey Figurine is a medieval gilt-copper alloy, Limoges enamel figurine found in St. Mary's Abbey, York in 1826. It was acquired by the Yorkshire Museum in 2019.

== History ==
The figurine was discovered in the ruins of St. Mary's Abbey in 1826. This information is recorded on an antiquarian label stuck to the back of the figure. It was lost until the 1920s, when it was recorded in the private collection of Franz Monheim of Aachen (1891–1969) and then passed down to his family. The figurine was publicly auctioned by Monheim's family, through the Van Ham auction house in Cologne, on 15 May 2019.

It was purchased for €8500. This purchase price was raised by York Museums Trust through grants from Arts Council England and the V&A Purchase Grant Fund.

== Description ==
The figurine measures 16 cm in height. It depicts the Crucifixion of Jesus in gilded copper-alloy. It has the remains of enamel champlevé decoration and includes stone settings on the crown, eyes and loincloth. Both hands and feet are missing. The back is hollow and included an adhesive label, which reads “Found in the ruins of St. Mary’s Abbey at York: in 1826”. It is an example of Limoges enamelwork and was made in France in the 13th Century.

== Public display ==
The figurine first went on public display on 21 September 2019 in the Medieval gallery of the Yorkshire Museum.
