= Statue of Mars, York =

Statue of Mars
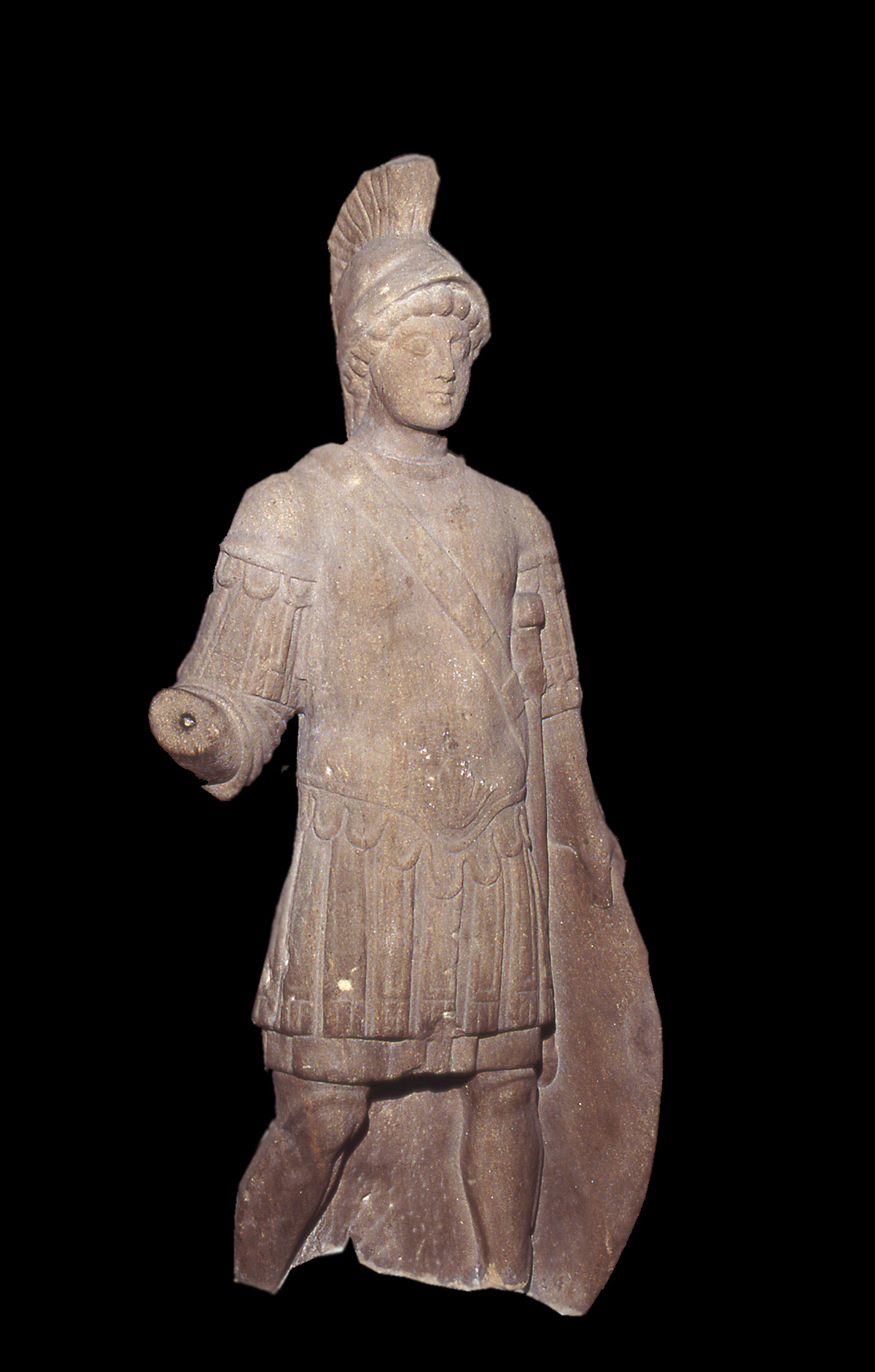
- The Statue of Mars in the Yorkshire Museum
- Material: Sandstone
- Created: c.4th century
- Period/culture: Roman
- Discovered: 1880; Bar Convent, York, North Yorkshire
- Present location: Roman Gallery, Yorkshire Museum, York
- Identification: YORYM: 1998.26

The Statue of Mars, York is a Roman stone statue depicting the God Mars, found in York in 1880 and now in the Yorkshire Museum.

== Discovery ==
The statue was discovered in 1880 on or beneath Bar Convent, York along with three religious altars. It was donated to the Yorkshire Museum (then the Yorkshire Philosophical Society) by the Mother Superior. The altars were dedicated to Mars, the Mother Goddesses, and Veteris respectively. It was carved "with great dexterity" from local sandstone and may originally have come from the fortress at Eboracum.

== Description ==
The statue stands to a height of 5 feet 10 inches (1.78 m), though it is missing the feet from below the ankle and any plinth it may have originally stood on. Mars is depicted as a youthful soldier, wearing a Greek helmet and bearing a large oval shield held in his left arm. He is wearing a cuirass with elaborate lappets beneath and at the sleeves over a tunic. He has a sword strapped on his left side. His right arm is extended but the hand is missing; this probably held a spear originally.

== Public display ==
The Statue was first put on display in 1881, in the Hospitium in the York Museum Gardens. It has featured prominently in the Yorkshire Museum's exhibitions ever since.

In the 1980s the statue was on display as part of an exhibition titled "Roman Life at the Yorkshire Museum".

In 2010 the Yorkshire Museum reopened after a twelve-month closure for redevelopment. The new exhibition, "Roman York - Meet the People of the Empire" features the statue as a central piece of the display and is situated at the entrance into the main hall of the museum.

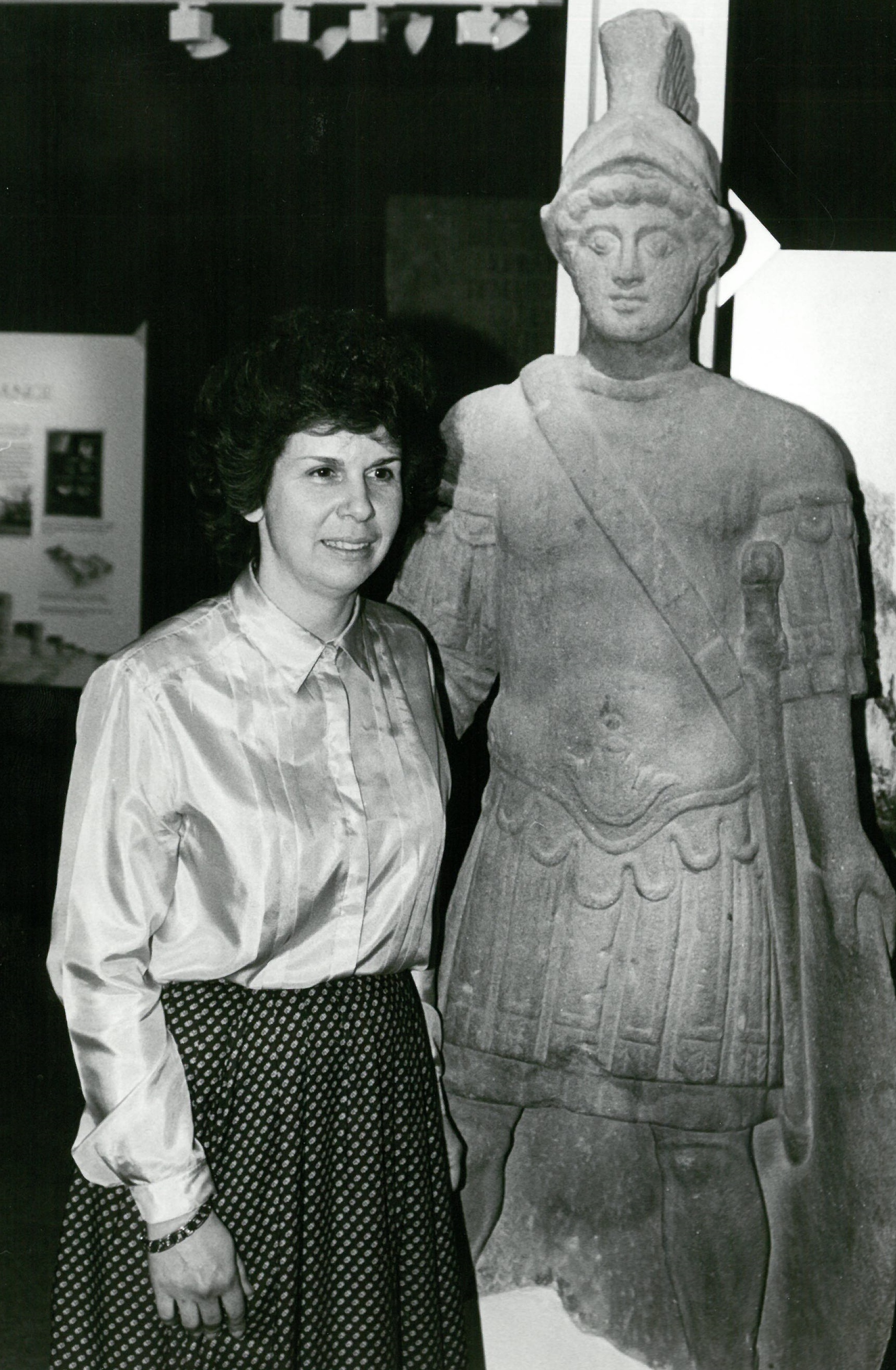
Keeper of the Yorkshire Museum Liz Hartley posing with the Statue of Mars in the 1980s.

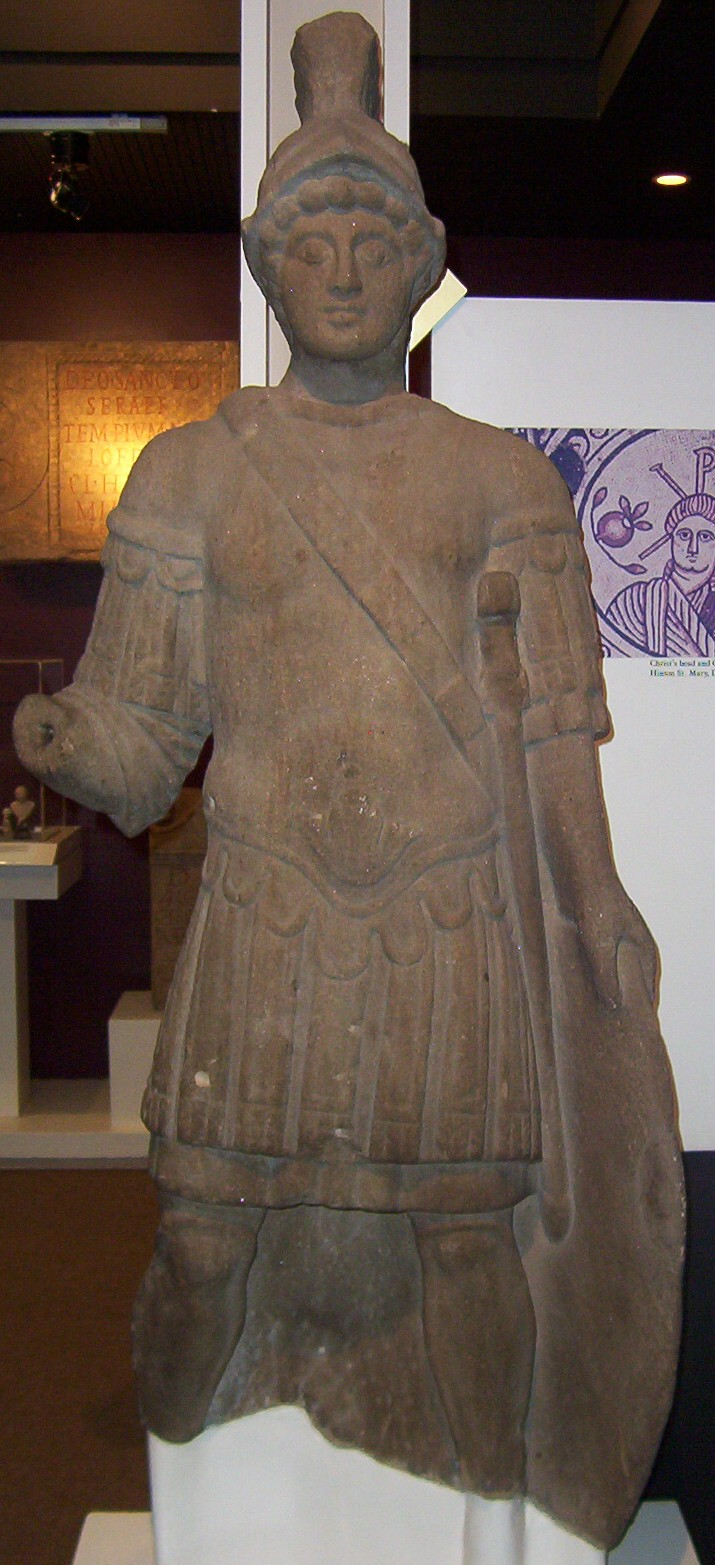
The statue on display in 2007.

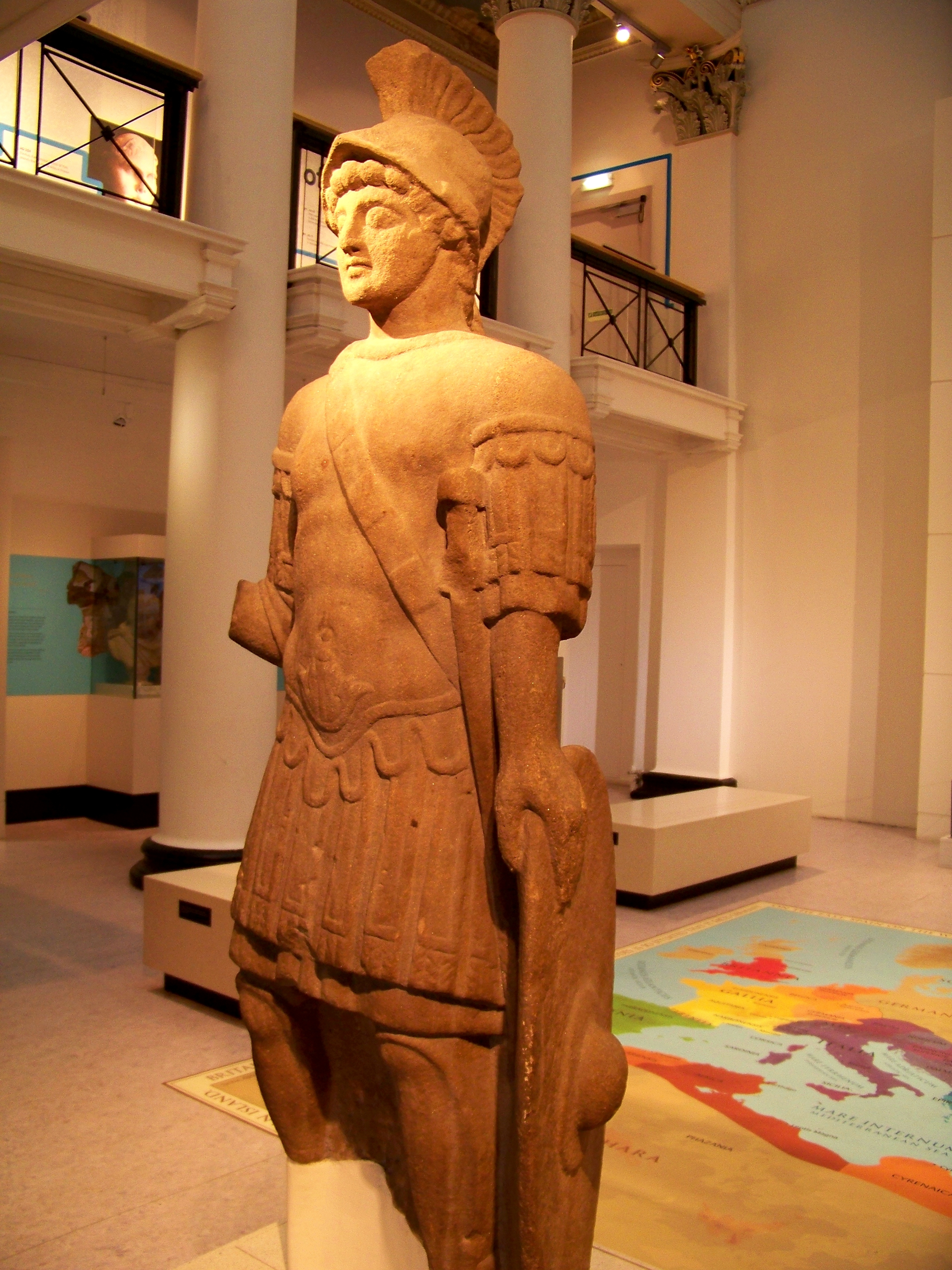
The statue on display in 2011.
