= Ryther Hoard =

Medieval coin hoard from North Yorkshire, England

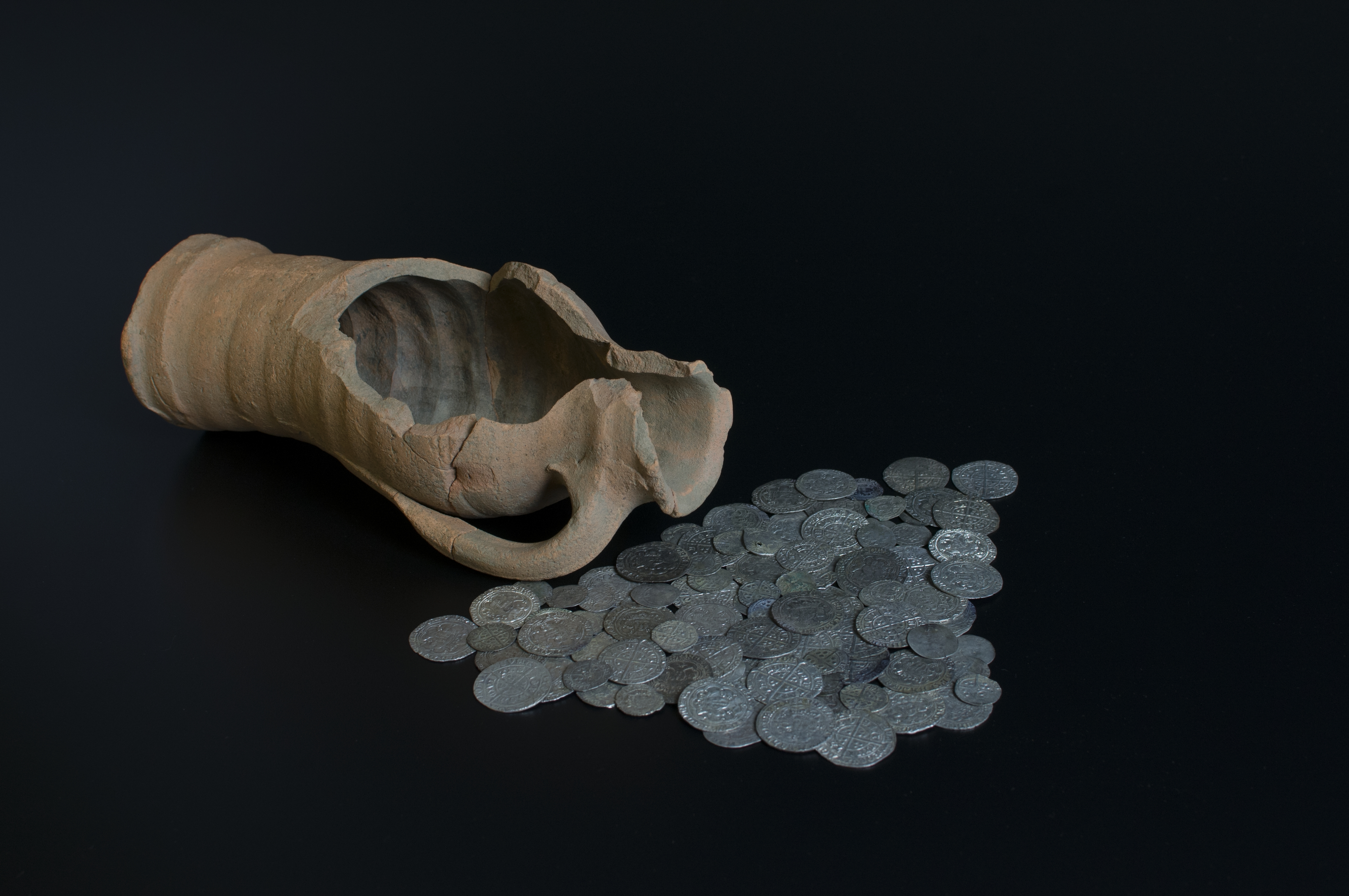
- The Ryther Hoard
- Material: Ceramic silver
- Created: 1480 (deposited)
- Period/culture: Medieval
- Discovered: 4 April 1992; Ryther, North Yorkshire
- Present location: Medieval Gallery, Yorkshire Museum, York
- Identification: YORYM : 1994.151

The Ryther Hoard is a hoard of coins found in a ceramic jug from Ryther cum Ossendyke, North Yorkshire, England.

== Discovery ==
The hoard was discovered by a metal detectorist on 4 April 1992 in a field near the village of Ryther. He discovered two silver coins at a depth of 18–20 inches (46–51 cm) before contacting the landowner about the potential find. Together they excavated the hoard by hand. 812 silver coins and the ceramic vessel were originally found, with a further 5 silver coins being added from a later search of the site. They were declared as Treasure trove at an inquest at Harrogate Magistrate's Court on 9 October 1992.

== Contents ==
=== Coins ===
The hoard comprises 817 coins found together with the ceramic jug. Most of the coins were English and included 238 groats, 30 half-groats, 532 pennies, and 2 counterfeit pennies. There were also four Irish groats, two Scottish pennies, and seven coins of the Low Countries. They date from the reigns of Edward I through to the Henry VII. The hoard was, thus, deposited in the late 15th century AD.

=== Jug ===
The jug is a small example of the Humber ware industry dating to the 15th century AD. The type is typically crude, unfinished, and never glazed. They are sometimes referred to as 'drinking jugs' but residue analysis has shown that they were frequently used as urinals.

== Acquisition and display ==
The hoard was acquired by the Yorkshire Museum.

In July 2021 it was displayed in an exhibition on the reign of King Richard III, in which a portrait of the King from the National Portrait Gallery was displayed.
