= Fulford ring =

Ancient British artifact

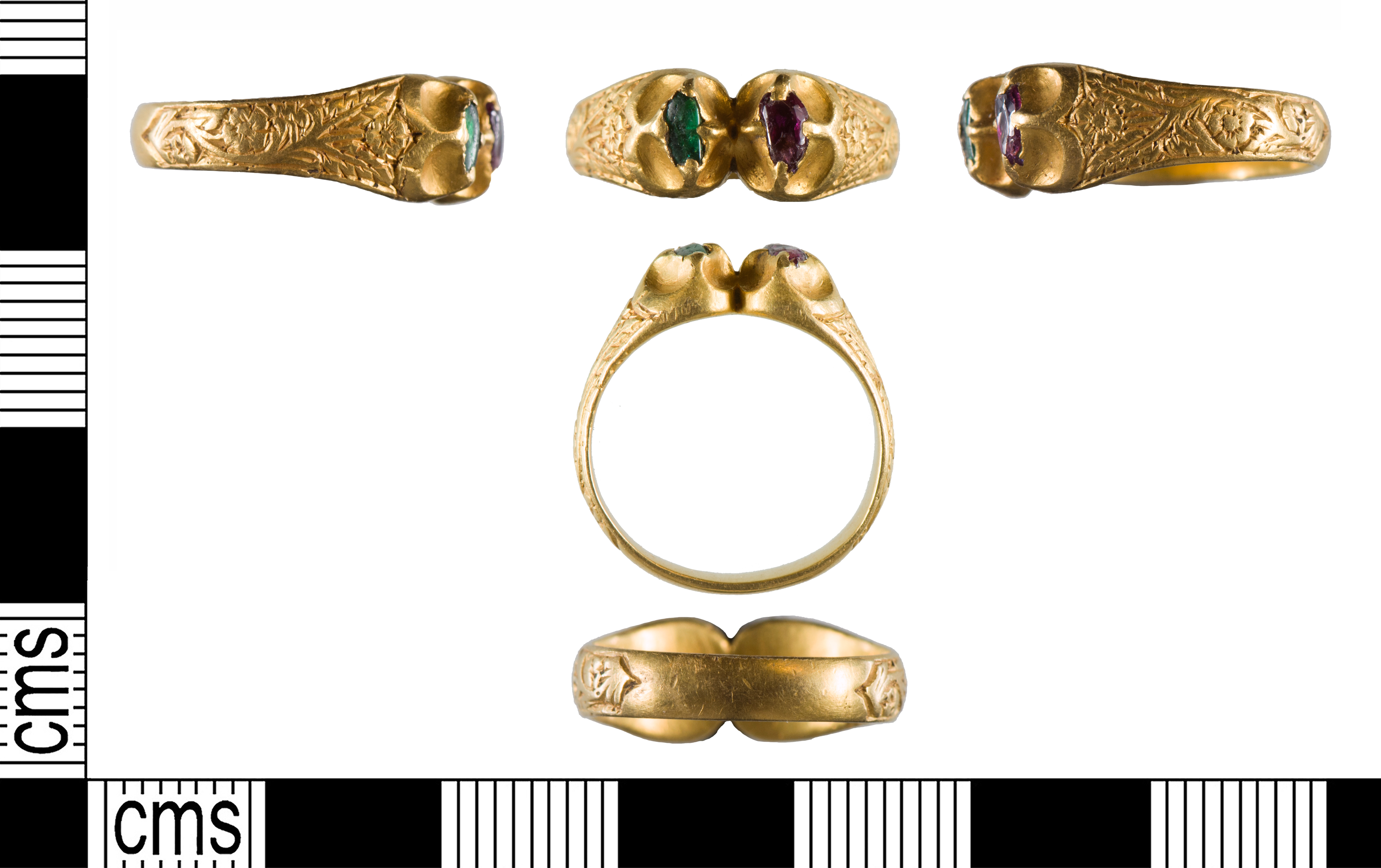
- Material: Gold, with emerald and ruby settings.
- Period/culture: Medieval
- Discovered: 29 December 2016; Fulford, North Yorkshire
- Present location: Yorkshire Museum, York
- Identification: YORYM-DE9DA0; YORYM : 2019.51

The Fulford ring is a medieval gold ring with emerald and ruby settings found by metal detectorist Paul Ibbotson in December 2016. It was acquired by the Yorkshire Museum in 2019.

== Description ==
The ring is complete and dates to the 15th Century AD. It has a ruby and an emerald set into the double-bezel and floriate, chip-carved decoration on each side of the band. The side decoration was originally filled with niello. It measures 19.7 mm in length, 7.1 mm in width and has an internal diameter of 15.6 mm. It weighs 4.42 g. X-ray fluorescence of the metal indicated that the ring had a surface composition of approximately 76–79% gold, 12–15% silver, the rest being copper (c. 8–10%). Raman spectroscopy was used to identify the gem stones.

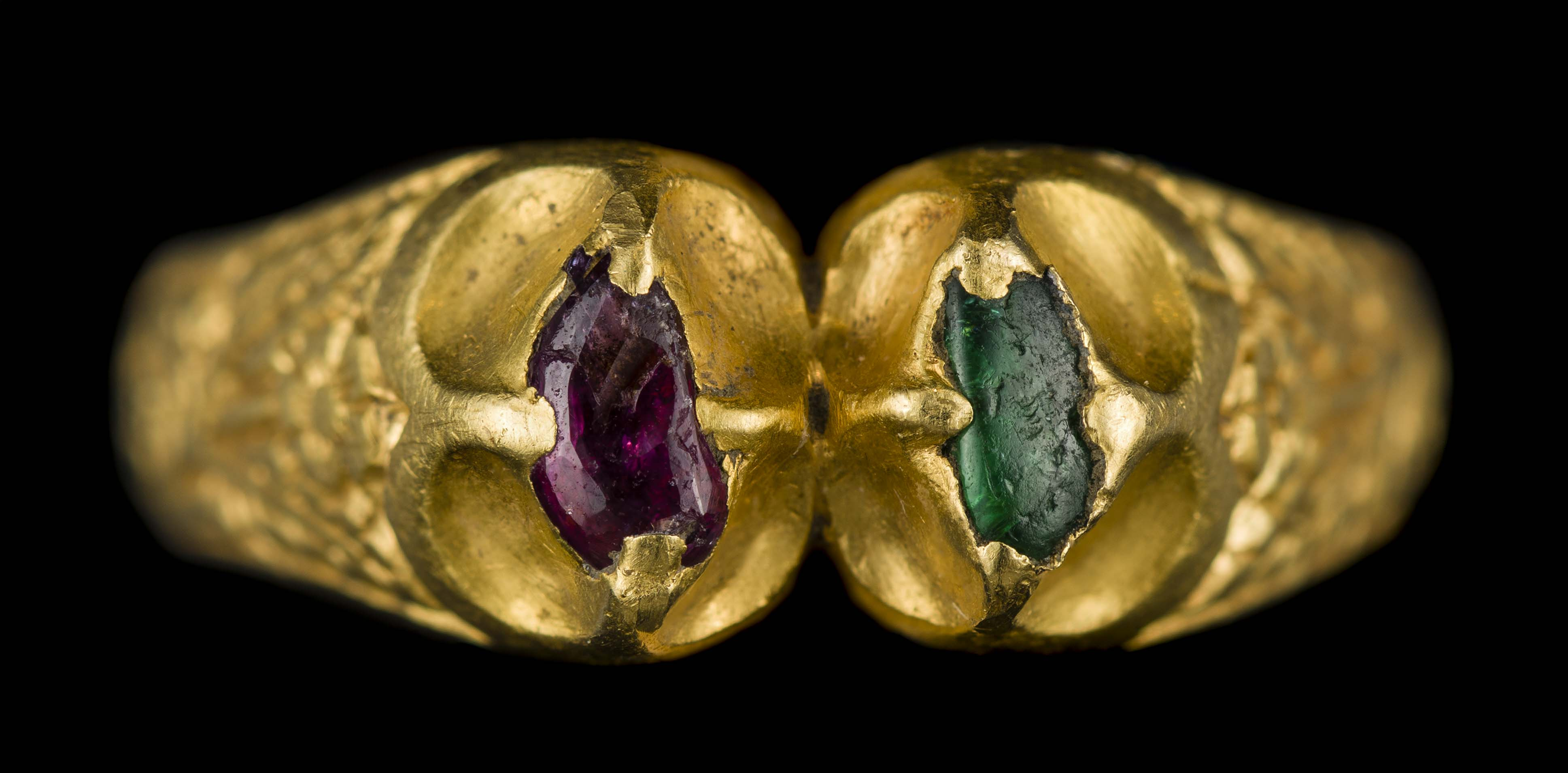

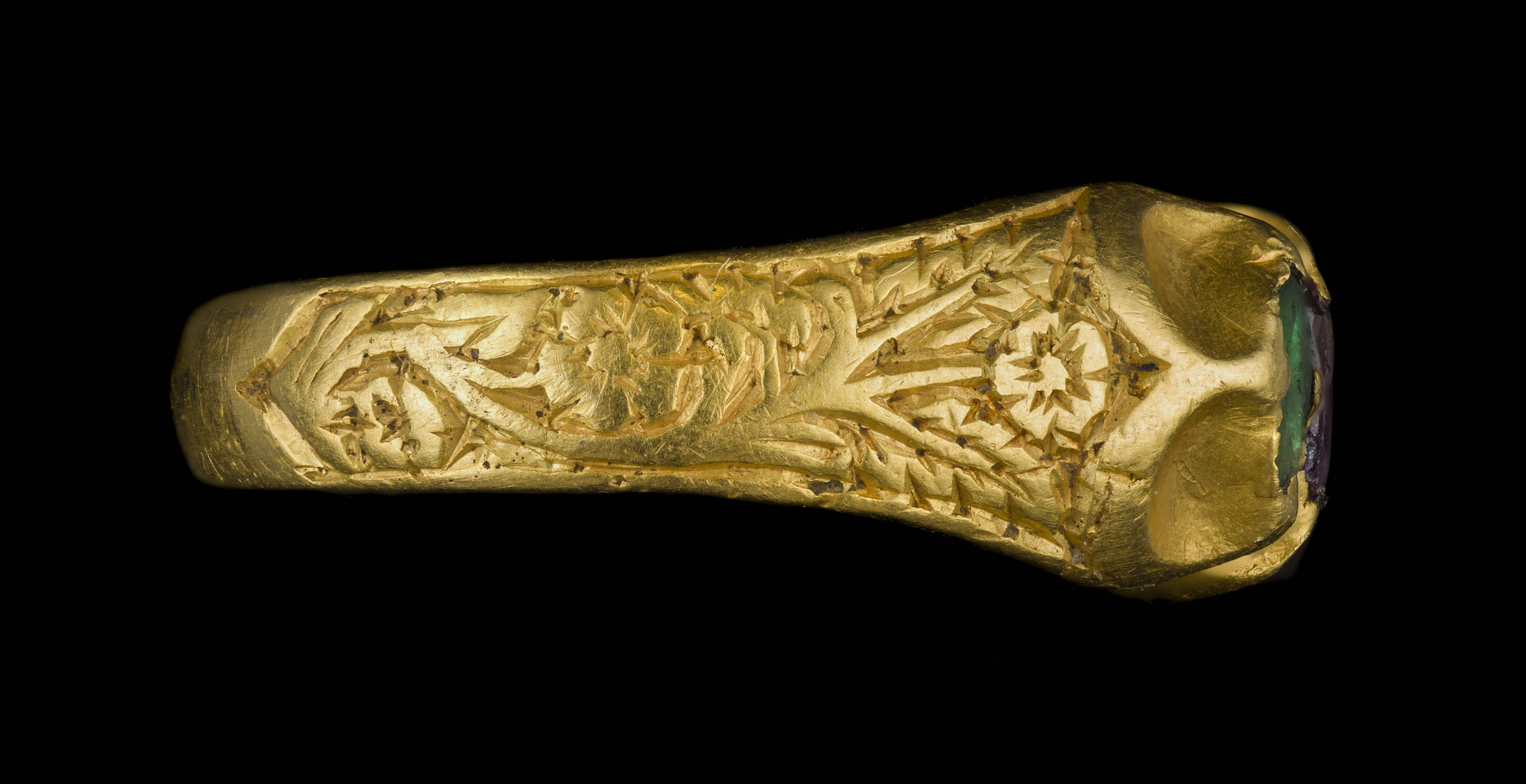

== Significance ==
The ring probably functioned as a love token or betrothal ring. Medieval lapidaries suggest that emeralds were associated with chastity and rubies with love and prevention of anger, which may have been important qualities in a medieval relationship.

== Acquisition and display ==
The ring was bought by York Museums Trust in 2019 for £20,000 with funding from the Headley Museums Archaeological Acquisition Fund, the Arts Council England/V&A Purchase Grant Fund, and public donations. The ring first went on public display in the Yorkshire Museum in September 2019.
