= Yorkshire Museum =

Grade I listed building in York, England

- Location within North Yorkshire
- Established: 1830; 196 years ago
- Location: Museum Gardens, York, England
- Coordinates: 53.9618°N 1.0875°W
- Type: Archaeological and natural sciences
- Visitors: 163,805 (2018–19)
- Directors: Kathryn Blacker, York Museums Trust
- Website: yorkshiremuseum.org.uk

The Yorkshire Museum is a museum in York, England. It was opened in 1830, and has five permanent collections, covering biology, geology, archaeology, numismatics and astronomy.

== History ==
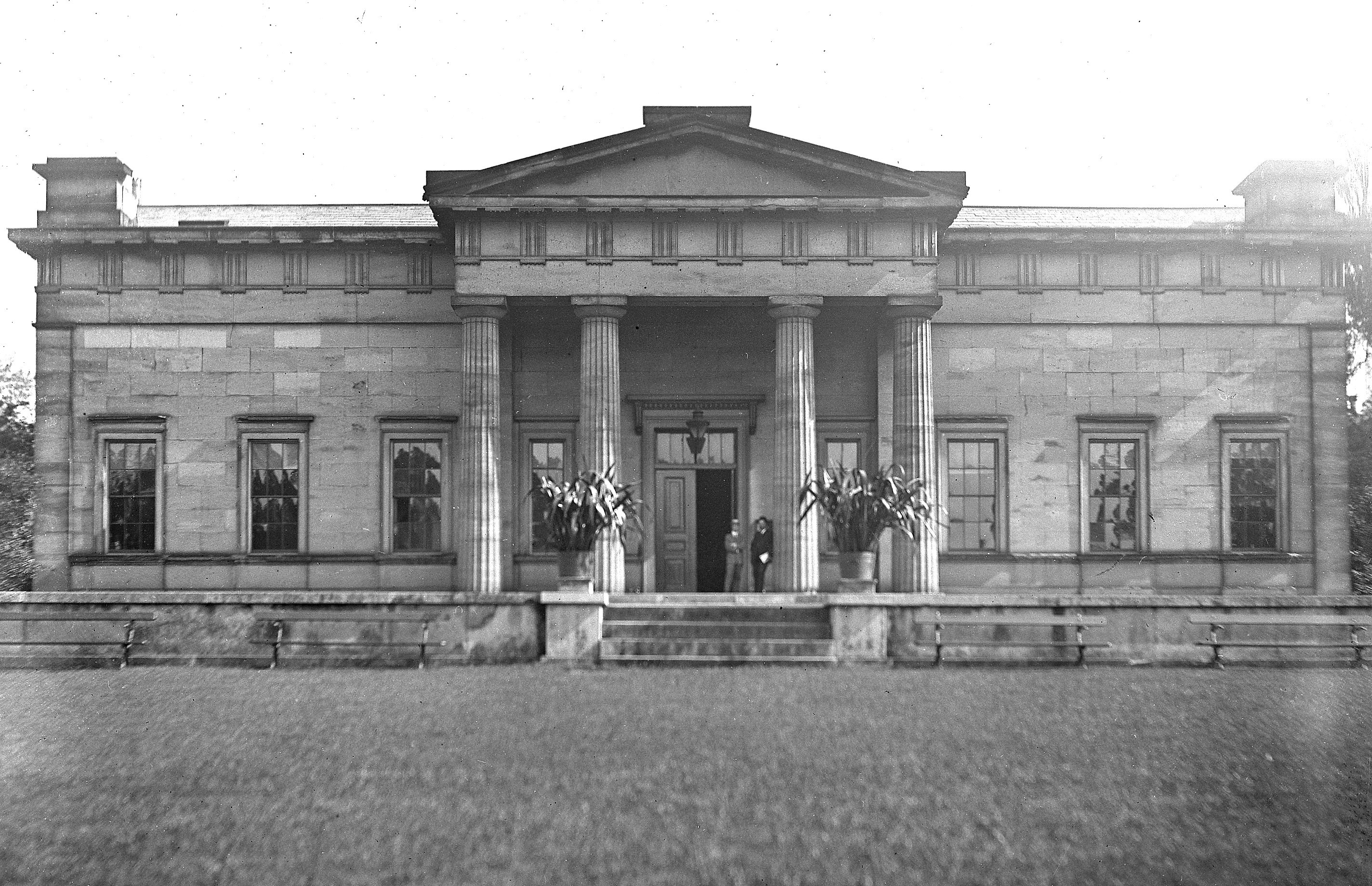
The museum building in the early 1900s

The museum was founded by the Yorkshire Philosophical Society (YPS) to accommodate their geological and archaeological collections, and was originally housed in Ousegate, York, until the site became too small. In 1828, the society received by royal grant, 10 acres (4 ha) of land formerly belonging to St Mary's Abbey for the purposes of building a new museum. The main building of the museum is called the Yorkshire Museum; it was designed by William Wilkins in a Greek Revival style and is a Grade I listed building. It was officially opened in February 1830, which makes it one of the longest established museums in England. A condition of the royal grant was that the land surrounding the museum building should be a botanic gardens and one was created in the 1830s. The botanic gardens are now known as the Museum Gardens. On 26 September 1831, the inaugural meeting of the British Association for the Advancement of Science was held at the Yorkshire Museum.

The Tempest Anderson Hall was built in 1912, as an annex to the museum, and is an early example of a reinforced concrete building. It is used as a conference venue and lecture theatre.

The Royal Archaeological Institute held its summer meeting of 1934 at the museum where it hosted the archaeological congress from 7 to 17 July.

The museum was narrowly missed by a bomb during the Baedeker Blitz on 29 April 1942, though the explosion caused damage to the roof and the windows. The curator, Reginald Wagstaffe, lived in Manor Cottage (a building adjacent to the museum) and was responsible for the subsequent clean-up effort of the debris, during which 'seven large bath-tubs' of broken glass and geological specimens were thrown away.

In light of financial issues from 1956 onwards, the YPS transferred the Yorkshire Museum and Museum Gardens to 'the citizens of York' on 2 January 1961. A plaque on the front of the Yorkshire Museum records this event. The York Corporation (now City of York Council) operated the museum from 1961 to 1974 when municipal boundary changes resulted in the creation of North Yorkshire County Council, to whom the museum transferred. It was returned to the City of York Council in 1996. The City of York Council set up the York Museums Trust in 2002, to manage the York Castle Museum, York Art Gallery, the Yorkshire Museum and the Museum Gardens.

The museum closed in November 2009 for a major refurbishment and reopened on Yorkshire Day on 1 August 2010. The £2 million scheme was largely carried out by the museum's own staff, who restructured and redecorated the interior of the building.

During the COVID-19 pandemic the museum, along with the other York Museums Trust sites, closed to the public on 23 March 2020. The museum remained closed a year later, but on 28 March 2021 it announced that it had received a £18,000 'Lifeline grant' from the Culture Recovery Fund for repairs to the building façade and roof. On 7 May 2021 it announced its reopening on 9 July 2021 with an exhibition featuring a celebrated portrait of King Richard III from the National Portrait Gallery. This exhibition, and the site, closed on 31 October 2021 for the winter period in order to save resources and undertake building repairs. In February it announced that it would reopen on 8 April 2022 with a new exhibition featuring the Ryedale Roman Hoard.

As of 2026, the museum has the following exhibits: "Roman York – Meet the People of the Empire", "Viking North", "Yorkshire's Jurassic World", "Chariots, Treasure, and Power: Secrets of the Melsonby Hoard", and "William Smith: The Map That Changed The World", referring to the world's first full geological map of a country.

=== Keepers and curators ===
The museum has had many keepers, curators and honorary curators over its lifetime. The first keeper was John Phillips.

== Collections ==
The four permanent collections at the museum all have English designated collection status, which means they are "pre-eminent collections of national and international importance". The collection began in the 1820s, with the collection of animal bones and fossils from Kirkdale Cave in North Yorkshire.

=== Biology ===
The biology collection contains 200,000 specimens, including both fauna and flora, with the majority of the collection made up of insects. There are two specimens of the extinct great auk, an almost complete skeleton of an extinct moa, passenger pigeons, and a large collection of Quaternary (c.125,000 years ago) specimens from the Yorkshire region including the remains of elephants, cave bears and hyena from Kirkdale Cave. In 1866–7, the museum was one of the three recipients of Dodo bones discovered by Harry Higginson.

=== Geology ===
The geology collection contains over 112,500 specimens of rocks, minerals and fossils. Fossils make up the majority of the collection numbering over 100,000 samples, and include important specimens from the Carboniferous, Mesozoic and Tertiary periods.

=== Astronomy ===
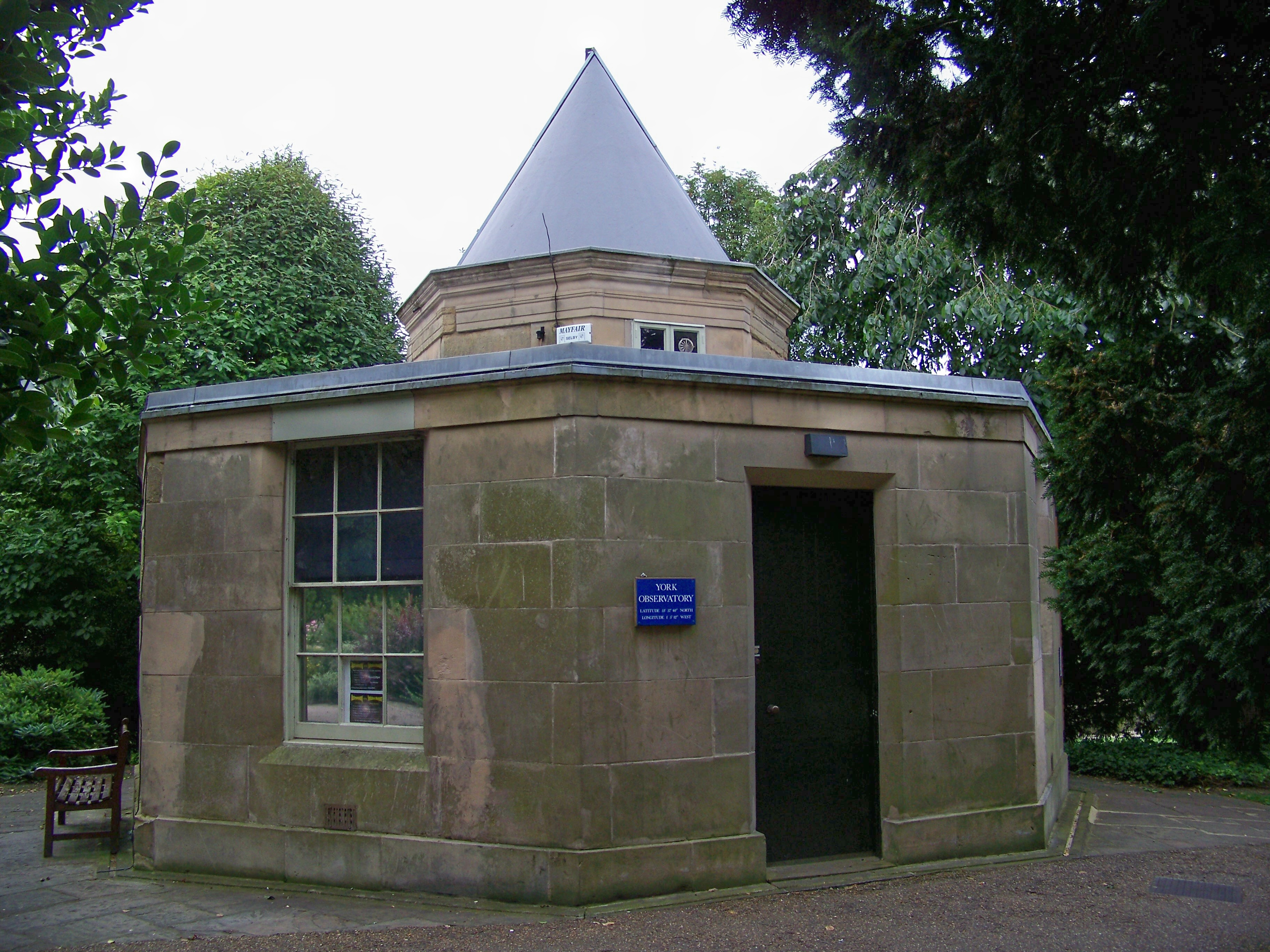
York Observatory

The astronomy collection is mainly kept in the observatory in the museum gardens with some telescopes kept at the Castle Museum in York. The observatory is staffed by volunteers.

=== Archaeology ===
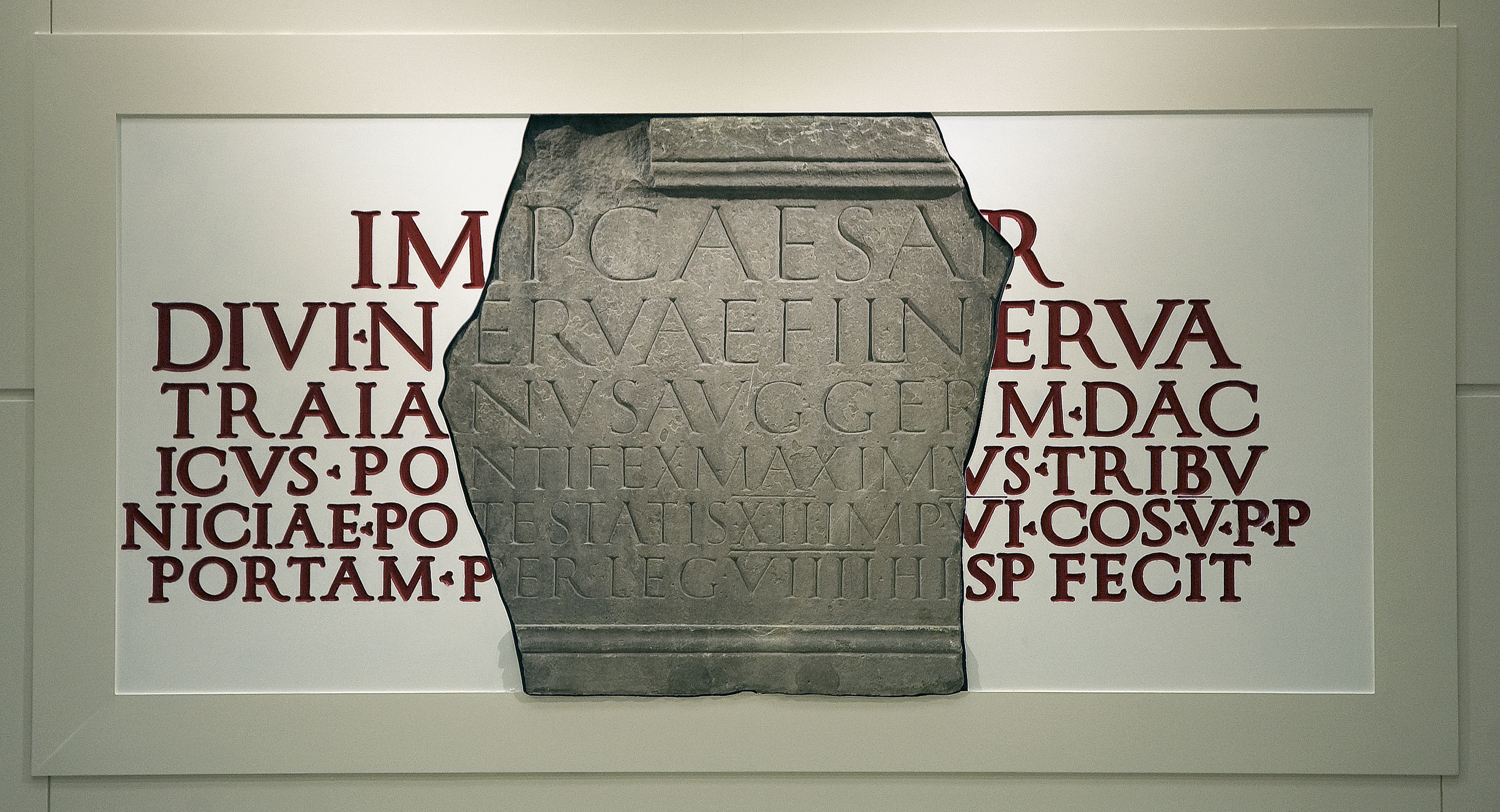
The final known inscription of the Roman Ninth Legion, the Legio IX Hispana (here inscribed in the bottom line as LEG VIIII HI(SP), whose ultimate fate is unknown.

The archaeology collection has close to a million objects that date from around 500,000 BC to the 20th century. Most of the objects from the Roman, Anglo-Scandinavian and medieval periods are from the York and Yorkshire area.

== Notable collections ==
=== Geological ===
- The Middlesbrough meteorite
- Alan the Dinosaur

=== Prehistoric ===
- The Star Carr Pendant, the oldest Mesolithic art in Britain.
- Some of the Star Carr Frontlets, a collection of Mesolithic red deer headdresses.
- The York Hoard of Neolithic flint tools.
- The Towton torcs, a pair of gold Iron Age torcs.
- The museum houses some collections of forged prehistoric tools by the Yorkshire forger Flint Jack.

=== Roman ===
- The Melsonby Hoard, a hoard of items from the Iron Age.
- The Wold Newton hoard, a hoard of 1,857 coins dating from the early 4th century AD.
- The Head of Constantine the Great, a fragment of a marble statue of the Roman emperor Constantine the Great.
- The Statue of Mars, a 4th-century sculpture of the Roman god Mars.
- The Heslington Hoard, a hoard of 2,800 coins dating from the mid-4th century AD.
- The Ivory Bangle Lady, a 4th-century skeleton of a woman.
- The Overton Hoard of silver denarii from the early 3rd century.
- The Knaresborough Hoard of copper alloy vessels from the 4th century.
- The Ryedale Hoard, Roman copper artifacts from the 2nd century.

=== Early medieval ===
- The Coppergate Helmet, an 8th-century helmet found in York.
- The Ormside Bowl, a silver-gilt bowl from Cumbria.
- A portion of the St Leonard's Place hoard of 9th-century Northumbrian pennies.
- The Bedale Hoard, a hoard of Viking silver jewellery and an Anglo-Saxon sword.
- The Escrick ring, an Anglo-Saxon gold and sapphire finger ring.
- The Gilling sword, a late Anglo-Saxon sword found in a river.
- The Vale of York hoard, a 10th-century niello silver-gilt vessel containing coins and jewellery.

=== Medieval ===
- The Middleham Jewel, a gold, diamond-shaped pendant set with a sapphire and engraved with a picture of the Christian Trinity on the front, and one of the Nativity of Jesus on the back.
- The Cawood sword.
- The Ryther Hoard.
- The Bootham Hoard.
- The medieval shrines of Saint William of York.
- A gilt-enamel figurine depicting Christ, produced in Limoges enamel, which was discovered in 1826 and subsequently lost, was purchased by the museum in 2019. It first went on public display on 20 September 2019.
Objects from the archaeology collection

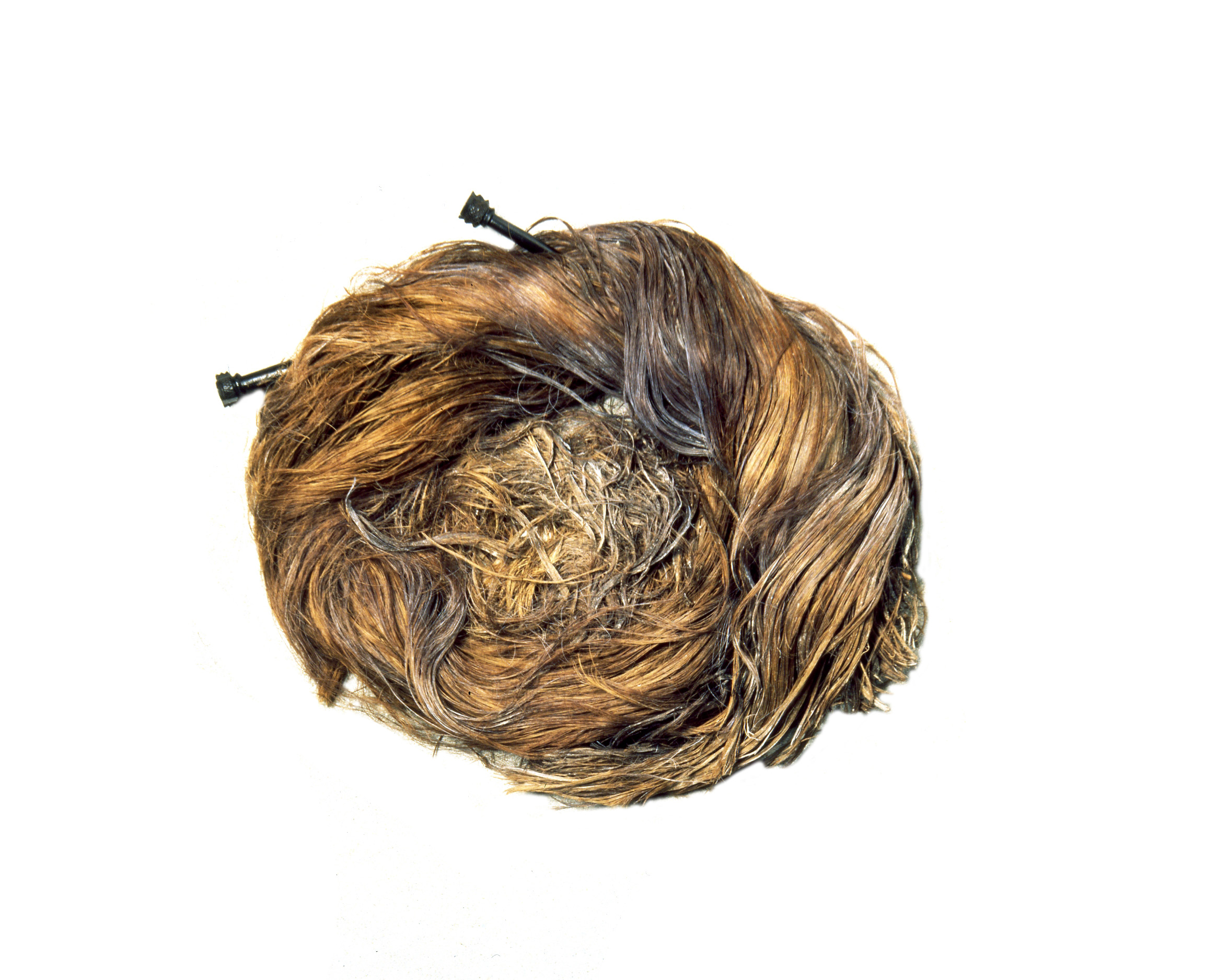
Bun of Roman hair from the late 3rd to early 4th century

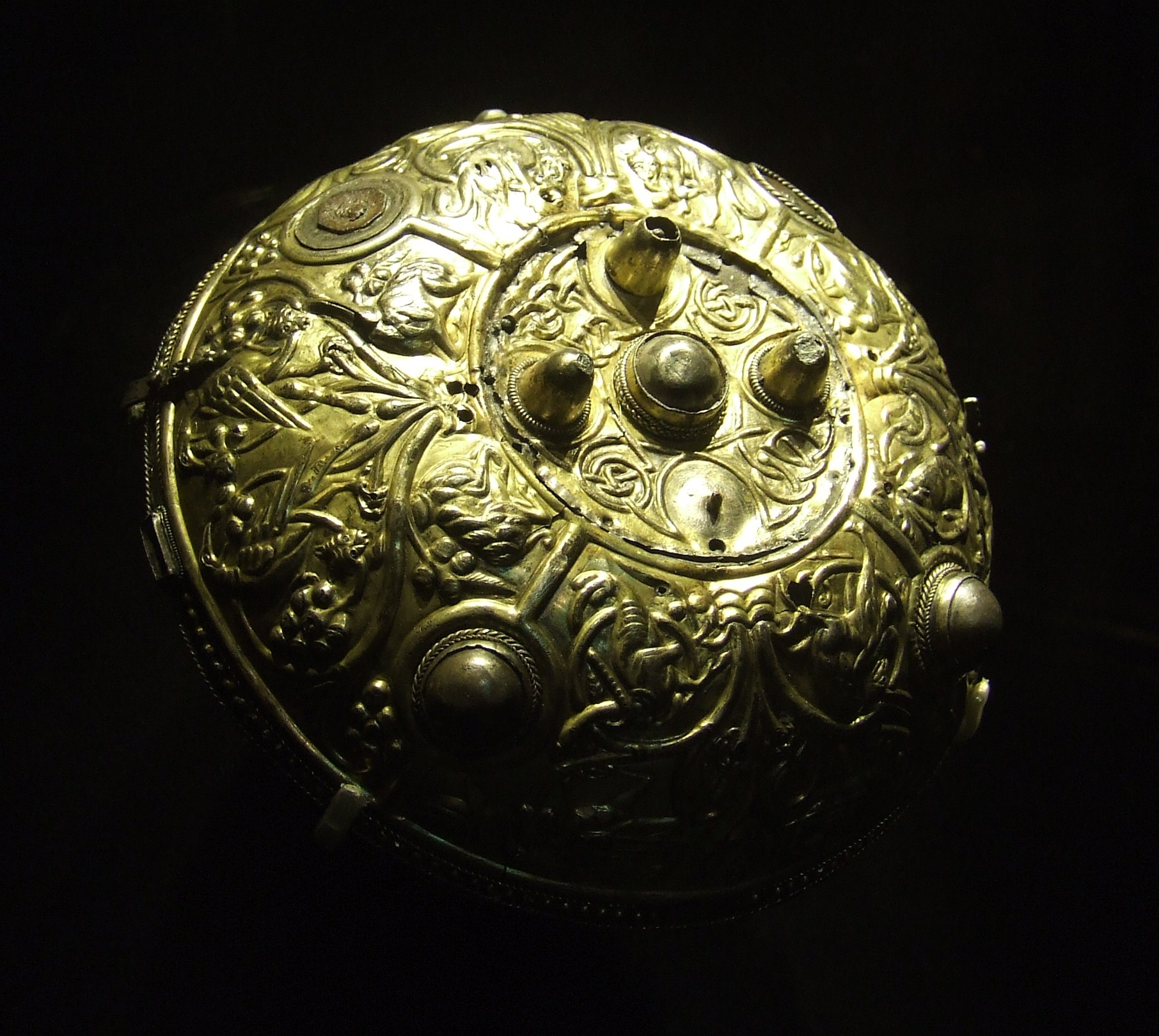
Ormside bowl

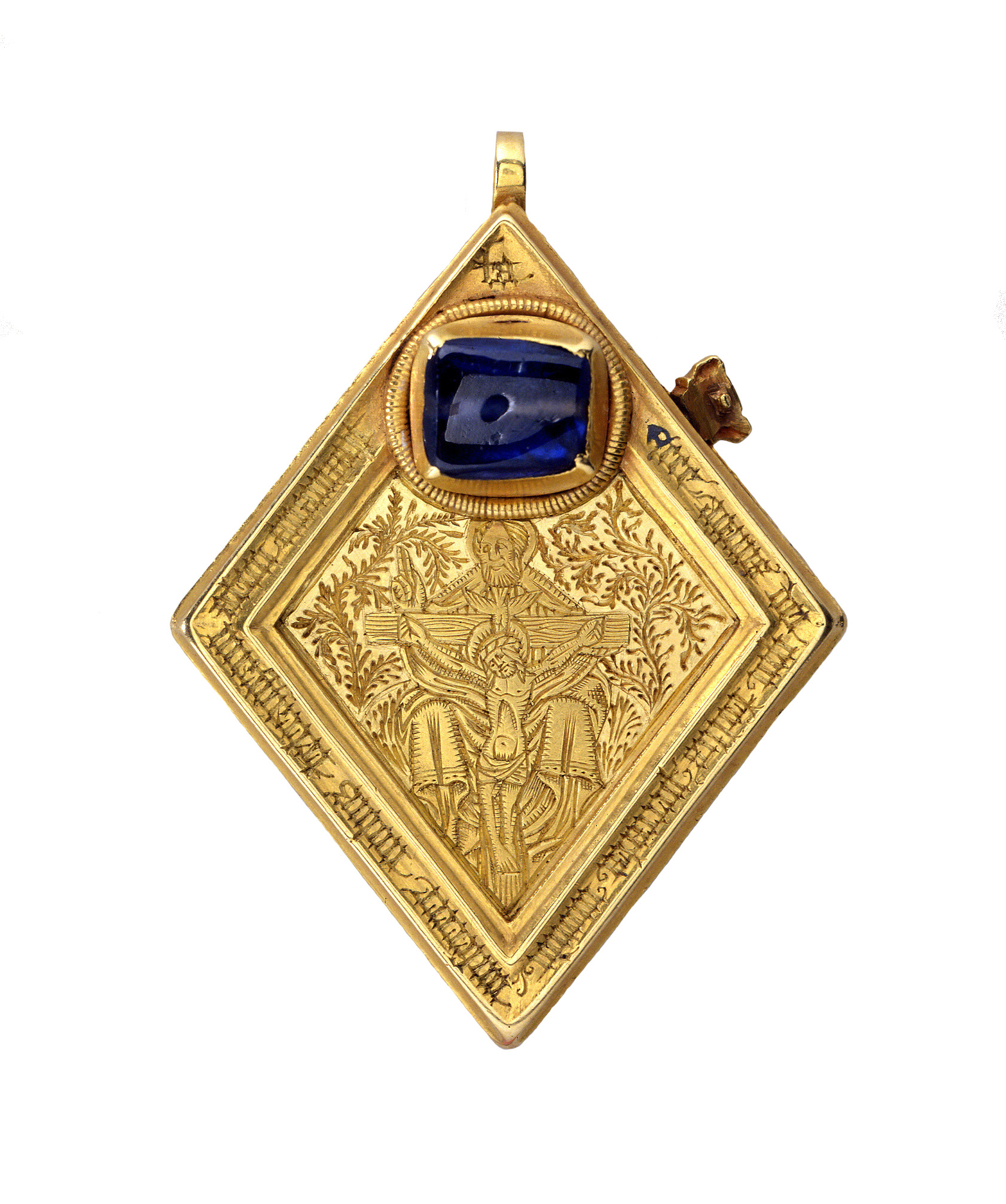
The front of the Middleham Jewel showing the Crucifixion of Jesus

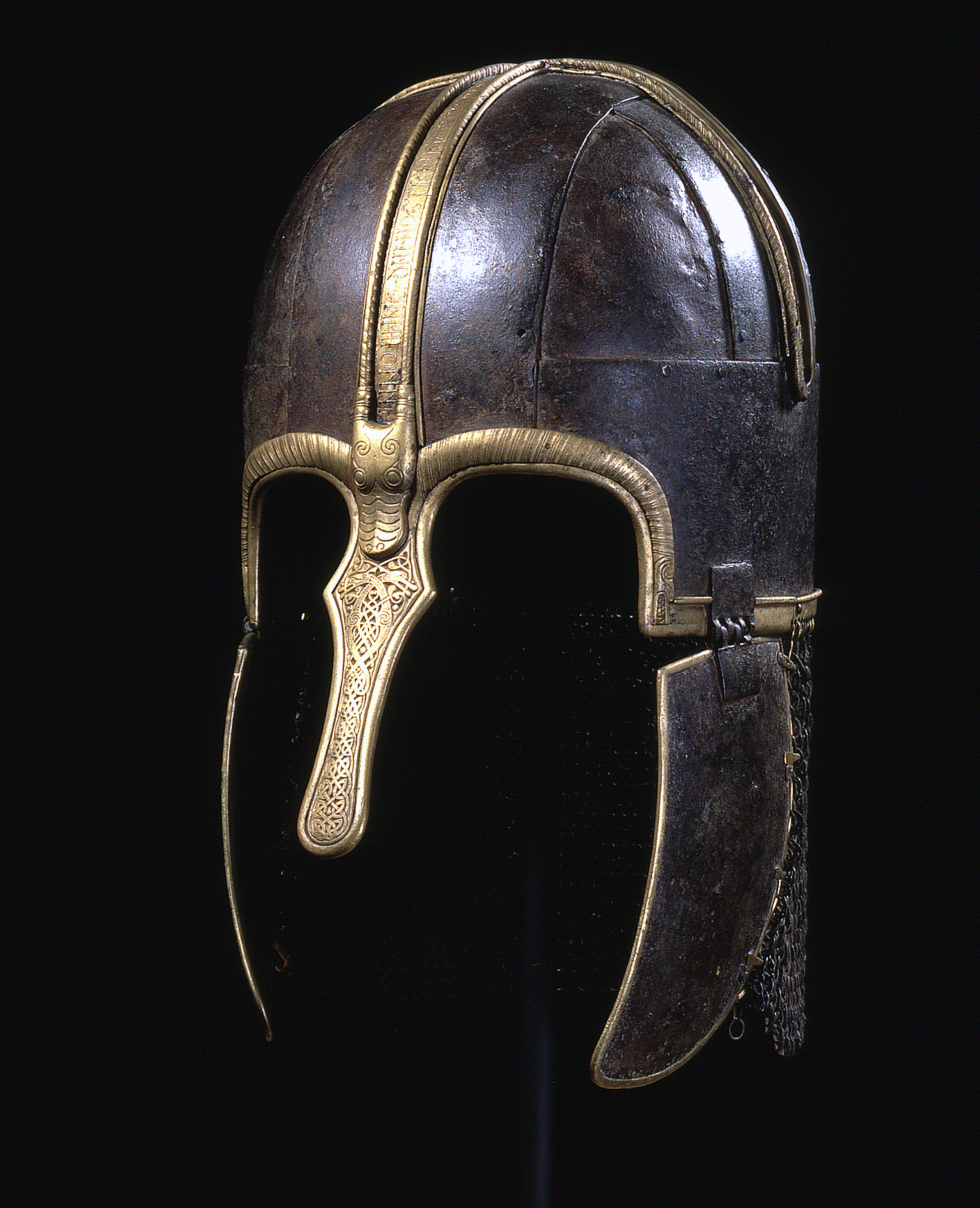
The 8th-century Coppergate Helmet

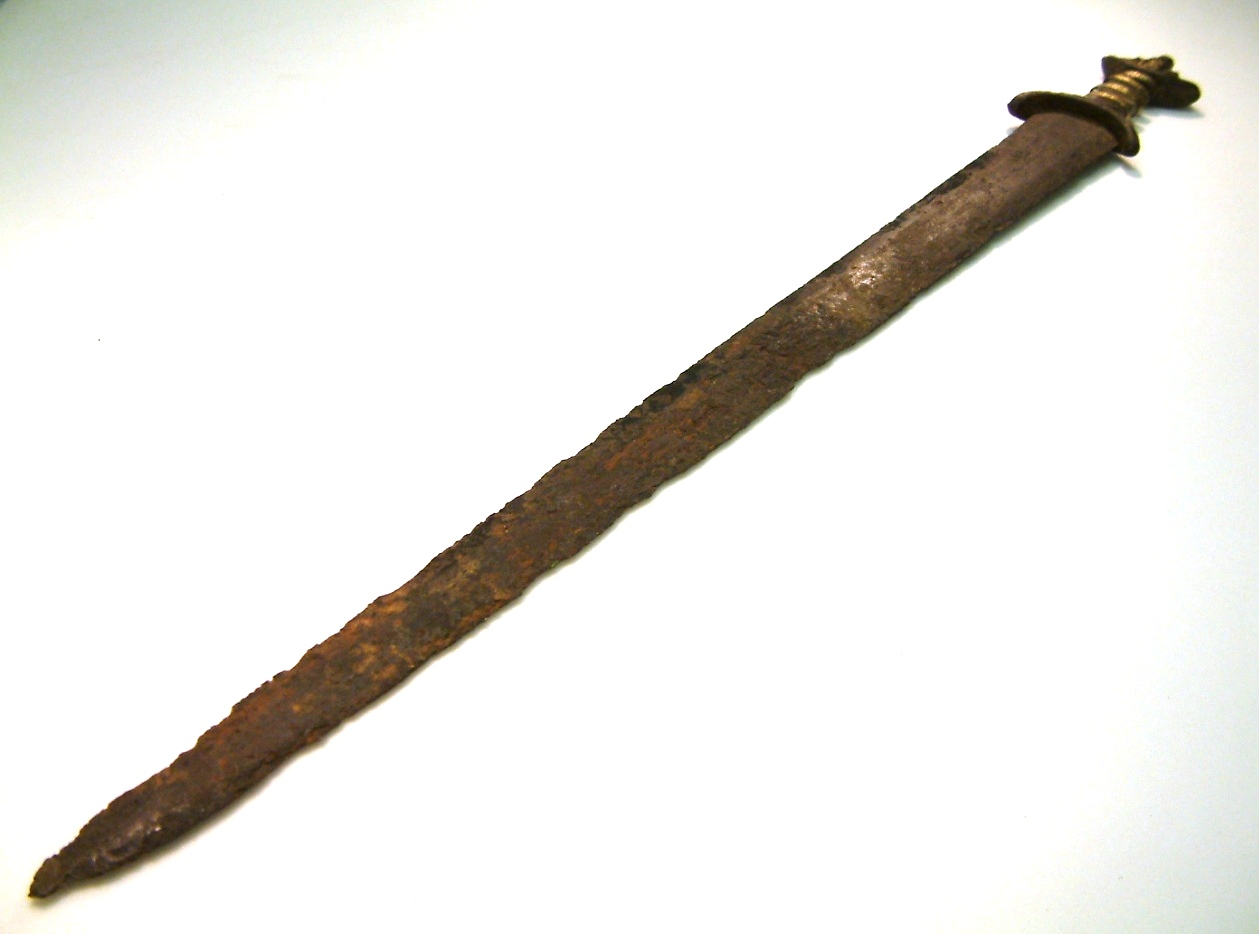
The 9th-century Gilling sword with silver decorated handle

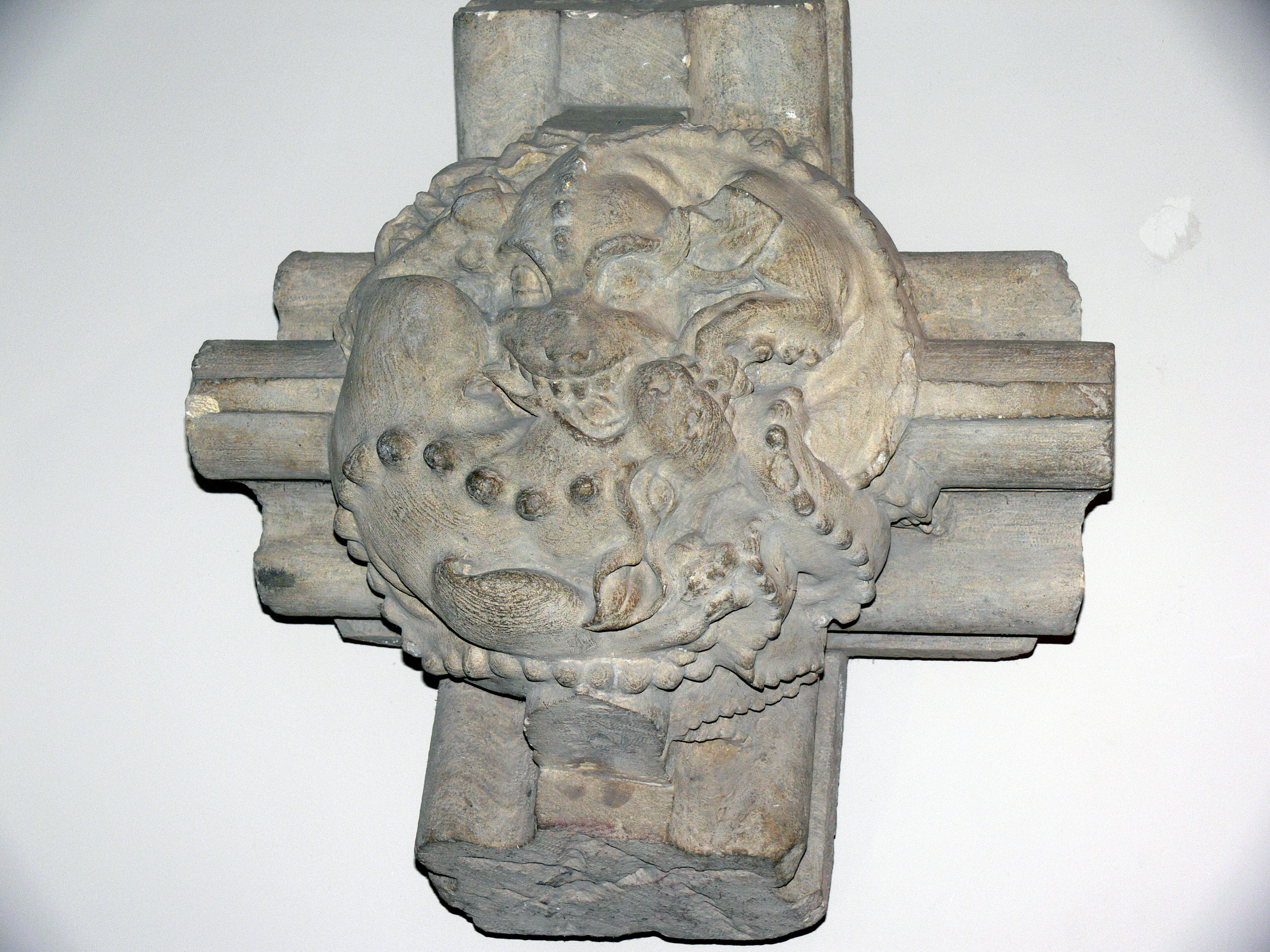
Carved medieval boss from St Mary's Abbey

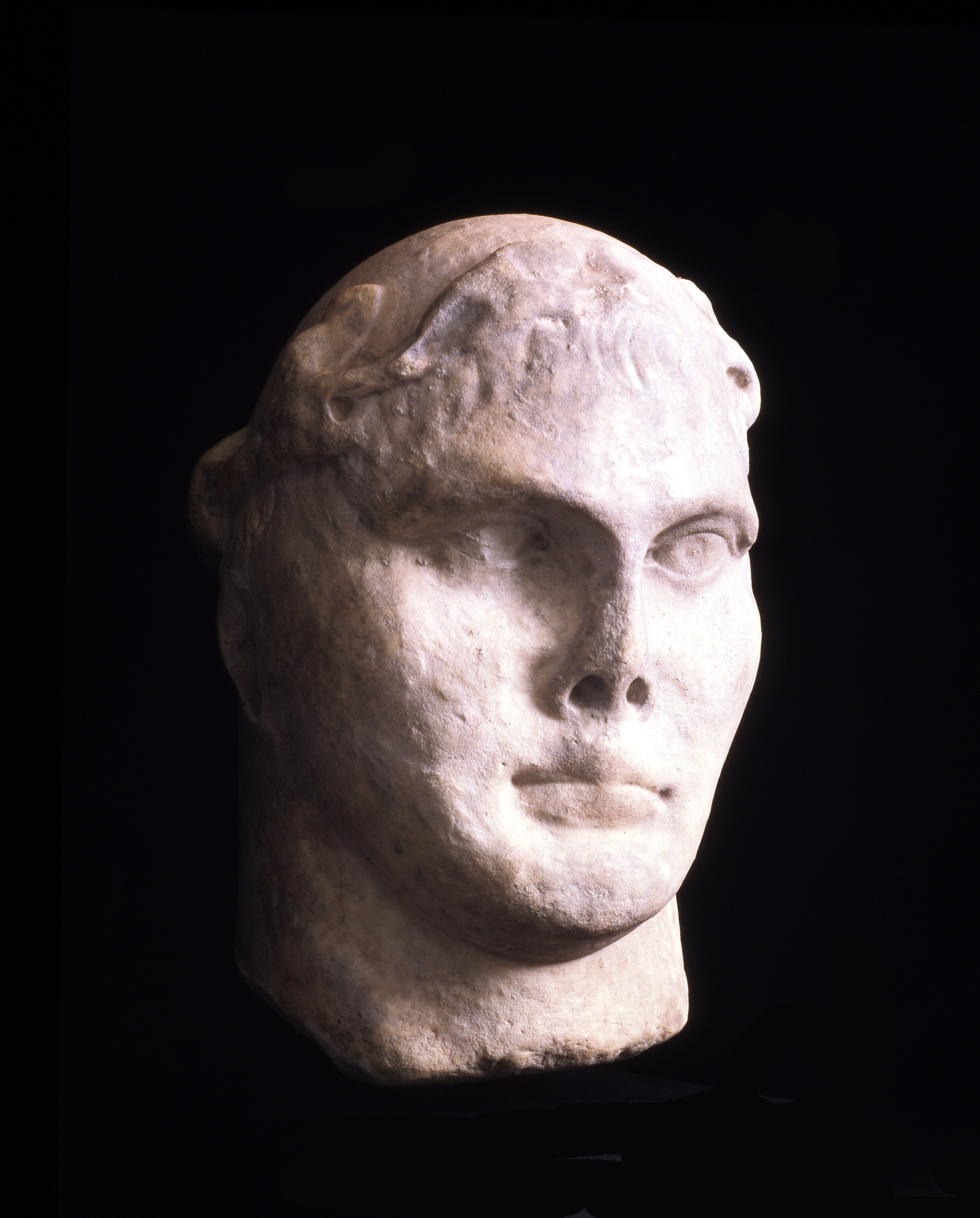
Marble bust of the Roman emperor Constantine the Great

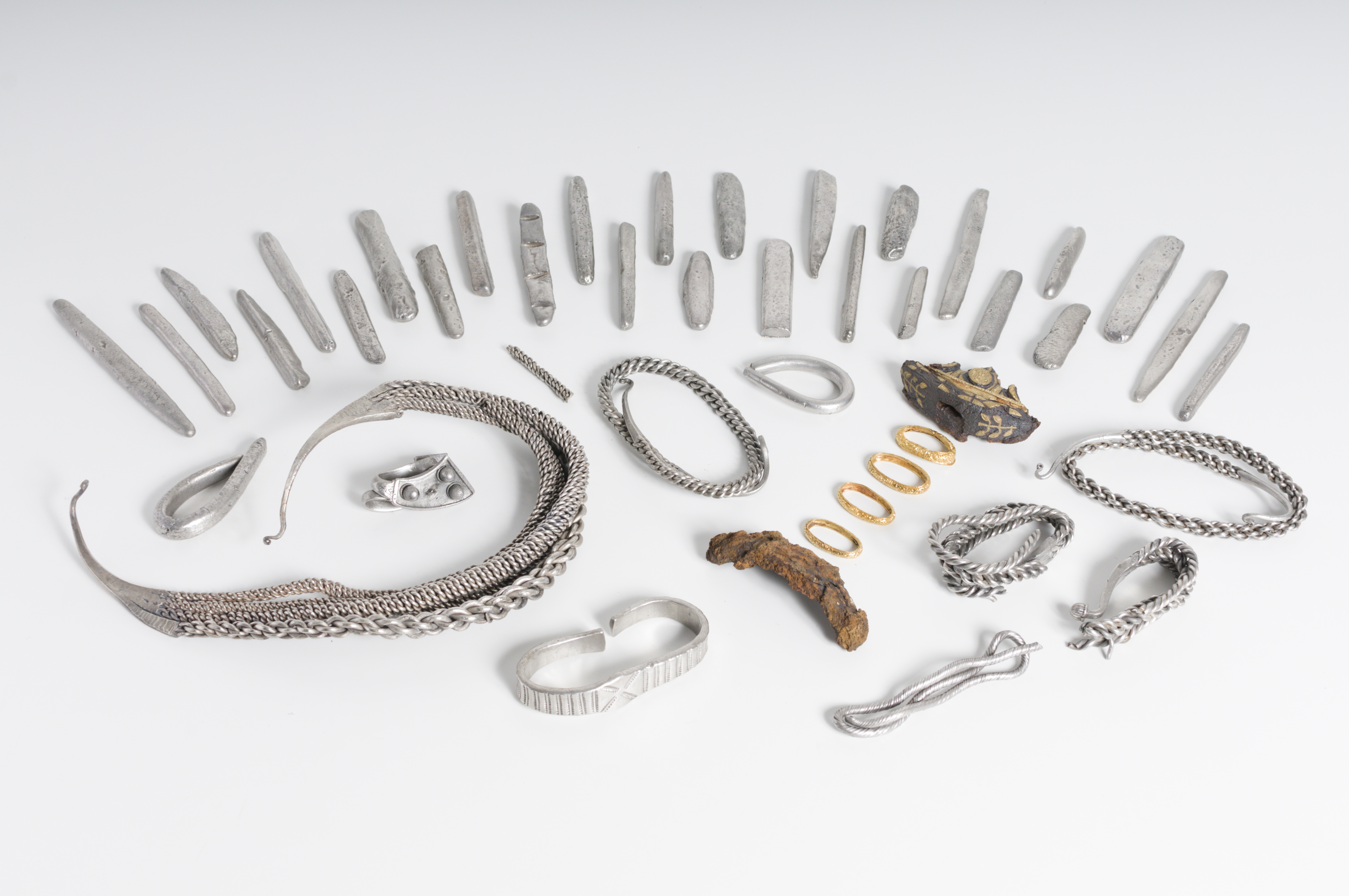
The Bedale Hoard of Viking silver and gold

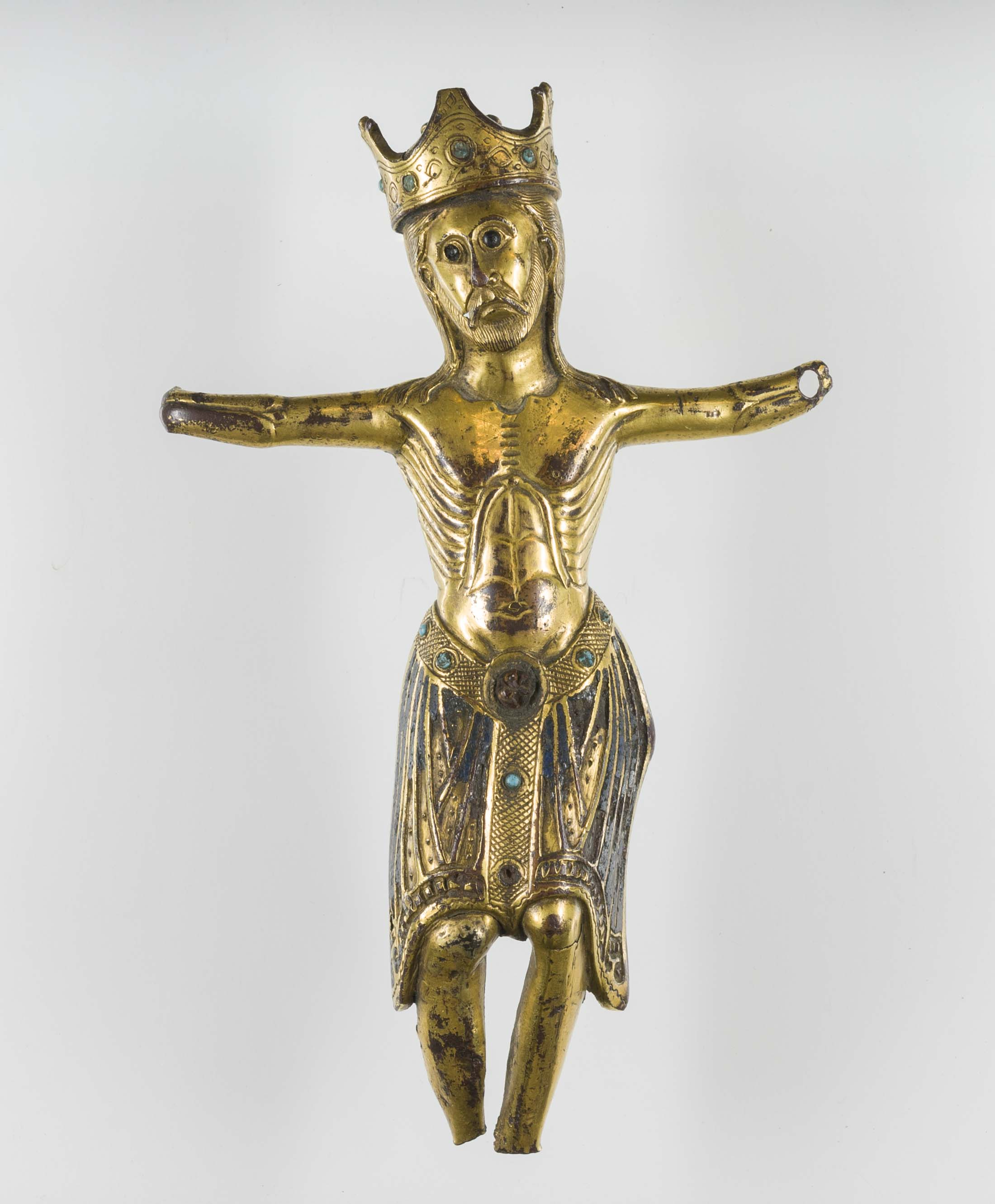
The St Mary's Abbey Figurine

== Events ==
The museum has 'Finds Days' in the main Yorkshire Museum building where members of the national British Portable Antiquities Scheme and museum staff will identify objects brought to them by members of the public. The information is also recorded to help build up a more complete archaeological picture of the past.

A monthly lecture series by the Yorkshire Philosophical Society is held in the museum's lecture theatre.

=== Roman Festival ===
The museum and the Museum Gardens first hosted the Eboracum Roman Festival in 2016. It has since become an annual event.

=== Curator battle ===
During the COVID-19 pandemic the museum was closed. It hosted a series of weekly competitions on social media to engage with other museums in order to find the best object of a given topic, titled the 'Curator battle'. Themes included searches to find the 'creepiest object' and the 'sassiest object' in museum collections worldwide. The 'creepiest object' category was featured in an episode of Have I Got News For You. The museum won a PRCA 'Just Marketing Award' in January 2021 for the '#CuratorBattle' twitter campaign in the category of 'Best performance during COVID-19'. Analysis by York Museums Trust of this social event concluded that more than 6.2 million people saw YMT collections online due to the campaign.

== Exhibitions ==
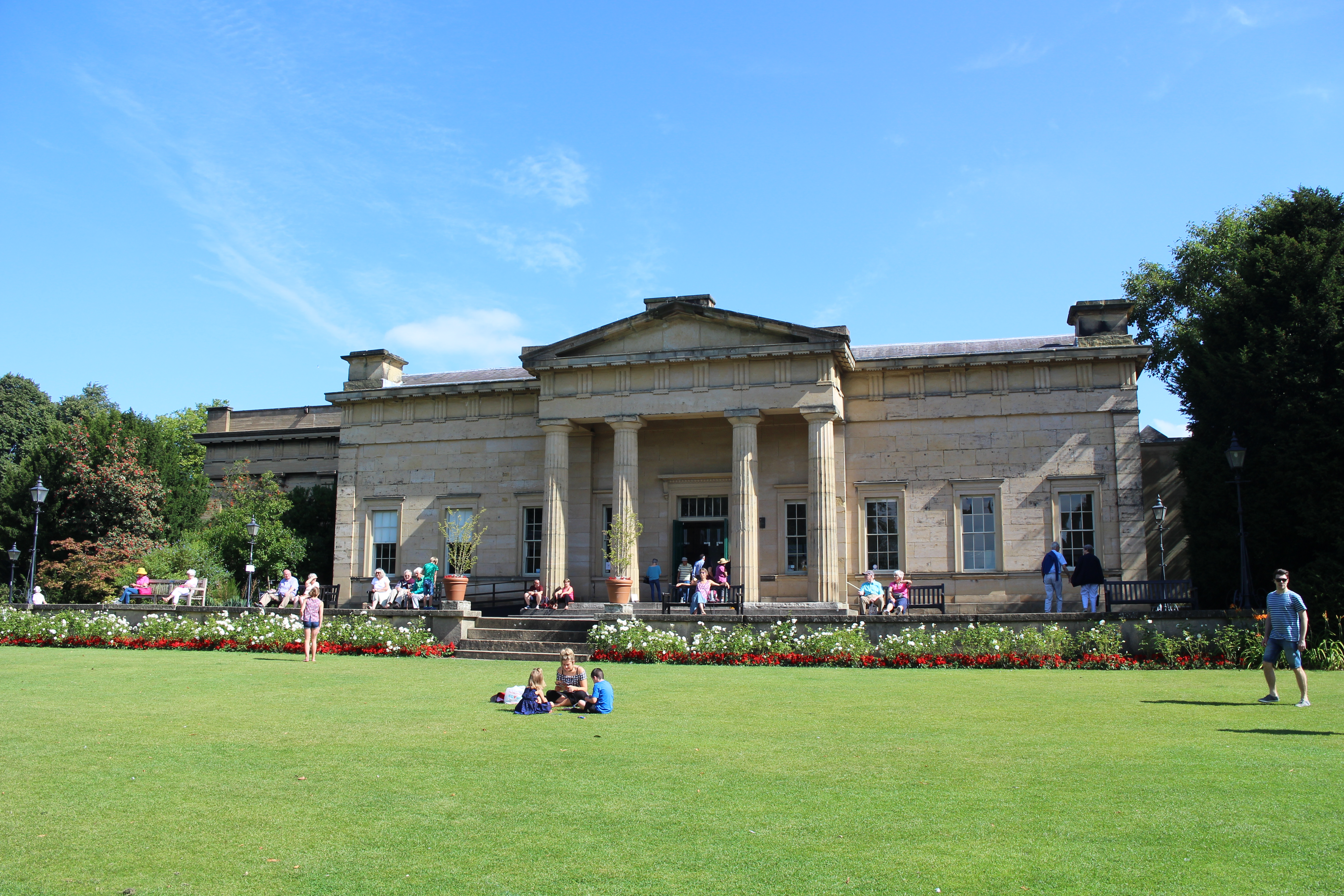
Yorkshire Museum

The museum has hosted many exhibitions since its inception.

=== 1950s ===
In 1954 temporary exhibitions were held on photographs of the royal tombs at Westminster and York silver.

=== 1970s ===
The 1976 exhibition "The Viking Kingdom of York" was seen by over 78,000 visitors.

=== 1980s ===
The Coppergate helmet was first put onto display in a permanent gallery space in 1980 following a £30,000 grant from the British Museum as part of the "International Viking Exhibition".

A third successful Viking exhibition, "The Vikings in England" was opened by the Prince of Wales on 30 March 1982 and was seen by over 235,000 visitors before it closed in October of the same year. This exhibition was awarded the European Museum of the Year Special Exhibition Award as a result of the presentation of the exhibition in the museum and for additional educational projects organised by the then Keeper Elizabeth Hartley.

The 1984 exhibition "A New Look at the Dinosaurs" was opened by David Bellamy and was seen by over 320,000 visitors. It was described in a review in New Scientist as "the best thing on dinosaurs you are ever likely to see".

The 1985 exhibition "Disappearing Forest Wildlife" was opened on 22 May 1985, again by David Bellamy. It featured a replica jungle setting and a vivarium containing live spiders, snakes and scorpions.

=== 2000s ===
A 2001 exhibition, held between 6 April and 26 September, was titled "Alcuin & Charlemagne: The Golden Age of York". It was the final one in a series of exhibitions throughout Europe titled "Charlemagne: The Making of Europe", with other venues in Paderborn, Barcelona, Brescia, and Split.

In 2002 temporary exhibitions included "Walking with Dinosaurs", "Slime" (a touring exhibition from Leeds Museums & Galleries), and "Blaschka – The Glass Aquarium" featuring the Blaschka glass sea-creatures.

In 2004, "Dust off the Dodo" featured collections from across the three York Museums Trust sites for the first time following its formation in 2002. It featured the Higginson Dodo, photographs by Tempest Anderson, and collections relating to Dick Turpin.

The 2006 exhibition Constantine the Great: York's Roman Emperor was described as "the most important archaeological-historical loan exhibition to have been held in a provincial British museum". It attracted over 58,000 visitors.

=== 2010s ===
The museum closed in November 2009 for a major refurbishment and reopened on Yorkshire Day on 1 August 2010. Following the 2010 refit of the museum, the first gallery displayed parts of the Roman collection, focusing on objects from Eboracum (Roman York). A statue of the Roman god Mars was prominently displayed, and there is an interactive display describing the lives of some of the Romans whose remains have been found in York. The final record of the famous lost Roman legion, the Ninth Legion, is on display as part of the Roman gallery. The stone inscription, which has been dated to Trajan's twelfth year as emperor, between 10 December 107 and 9 December 108, commemorates the legion's rebuilding in stone of the south-eastern wall of Eboracum's legionary fortress. The BBC reports that "Experts have described it the finest example of Romano British inscription in existence".

The facial reconstruction of King Richard III was displayed in the museum from July–October 2013 as part of a national tour.

A Shakespearean First Folio was on display in the medieval gallery in 2014.

In 2015 the museum first displayed the oldest Sauropod fossil from the Yorkshire coast, nicknamed 'Alan the Dinosaur'.

In 2016 a recently discovered, unique Mesolithic pendant from Star Carr first went on public display.

In 2017 the museum hosted the first stage of a touring exhibition titled 'Viking: Rediscover the Legend', opened by Alice Roberts. The exhibition was co-curated by the British Museum and subsequently travelled to the Atkinson Art Gallery and Library in Southport, Aberdeen Art Gallery, Norwich Castle Museum, and the University of Nottingham. The exhibition was awarded the 'Excellence in Media Arts' award at the 2017 York Culture Awards.

In April 2018, Yorkshire's Jurassic World exhibition, including marine and land fossils from Yorkshire and elsewhere, was opened by David Attenborough. The exhibition, like the Viking exhibition the previous year, was also awarded the 'Excellence in Media Arts' awards at the 2018 York Culture Awards.

On 21 September 2019 the St Mary's Abbey Figurine first went on public display. It is a medieval gilt-copper alloy, Limoges enamel figurine found in St Mary's Abbey, York in 1826 and acquired in 2019 from a purchase at auction. During this update to the exhibition, the Fulford ring was first put on display.

=== 2020s ===
In November 2019, the museum announced that a portrait of King Richard III would be on loan from the National Portrait Gallery in summer 2020. The exhibition was funded by a grant of £17,625 from the Weston Loan Programme and Art Fund. The opening of this exhibition was delayed because of the COVID-19 pandemic. It opened to the public on 9 July 2021. The exhibition and the museum closed on 31 October 2021 for the winter season.

The museum reopened on 8 April 2023, featuring a new exhibition focussing on the Ryedale Hoard titled "The Ryedale Hoard: A Roman Mystery".

A family-friendly exhibition titled "Mary Anning Rocks!" opened on 14 July 2023 featuring the maquette of the Statue of Mary Anning.

In February 2024 the museum announced an upcoming exhibition about the Mesolithic site of Star Carr titled "Star Carr: Life after the ice" opening on 22 March 2024. The exhibition is in collaboration with the University of York and features objects from excavations that have never been publicly displayed before, such as the world's oldest hunting bow.

The Viking North exhibition opened to the public in July 2025.

== Theft ==
In March 2012 two Stone Age hand axes were stolen from a public handling display in the museum. They were returned to the museum in June 2012 after a private dealer who had purchased the objects came forward to the police.

== The Yorkshire Museum Ghost ==
A series of reportedly paranormal events were recorded in the museum in the winter of 1953 and the early months of 1954. In a 1958 report of the events, the museum's caretaker George Jonas reported to have seen the ghost of a man in Edwardian dress entering the museum's library and that a book repeatedly drew itself from its shelf and fell to the floor on several occasions. A disagreement between the curator George Willmot and the head of the Yorkshire Philosophical Society, H. E. Harrowell, over the scepticism of the latter led to the resignation of Mr. Willmot. The phenomenon of the falling book was reportedly witnessed several times, always on a Sunday evening. On Wednesday 27 January 1954, eight people entered the museum library to witness the event and signed witness statements recounting their experiences; these included a feeling of cold around the legs, the book removing itself from the shelf, and the leaves of the book still moving whilst it was on the floor.

== See also ==
- Grade I listed buildings in the City of York
- Listed buildings in York (outside the city walls, northern part)
