= Overton Hoard =

Roman coin hoard from North Yorkshire, England

Coordinates: 53.994°N 1.156°W

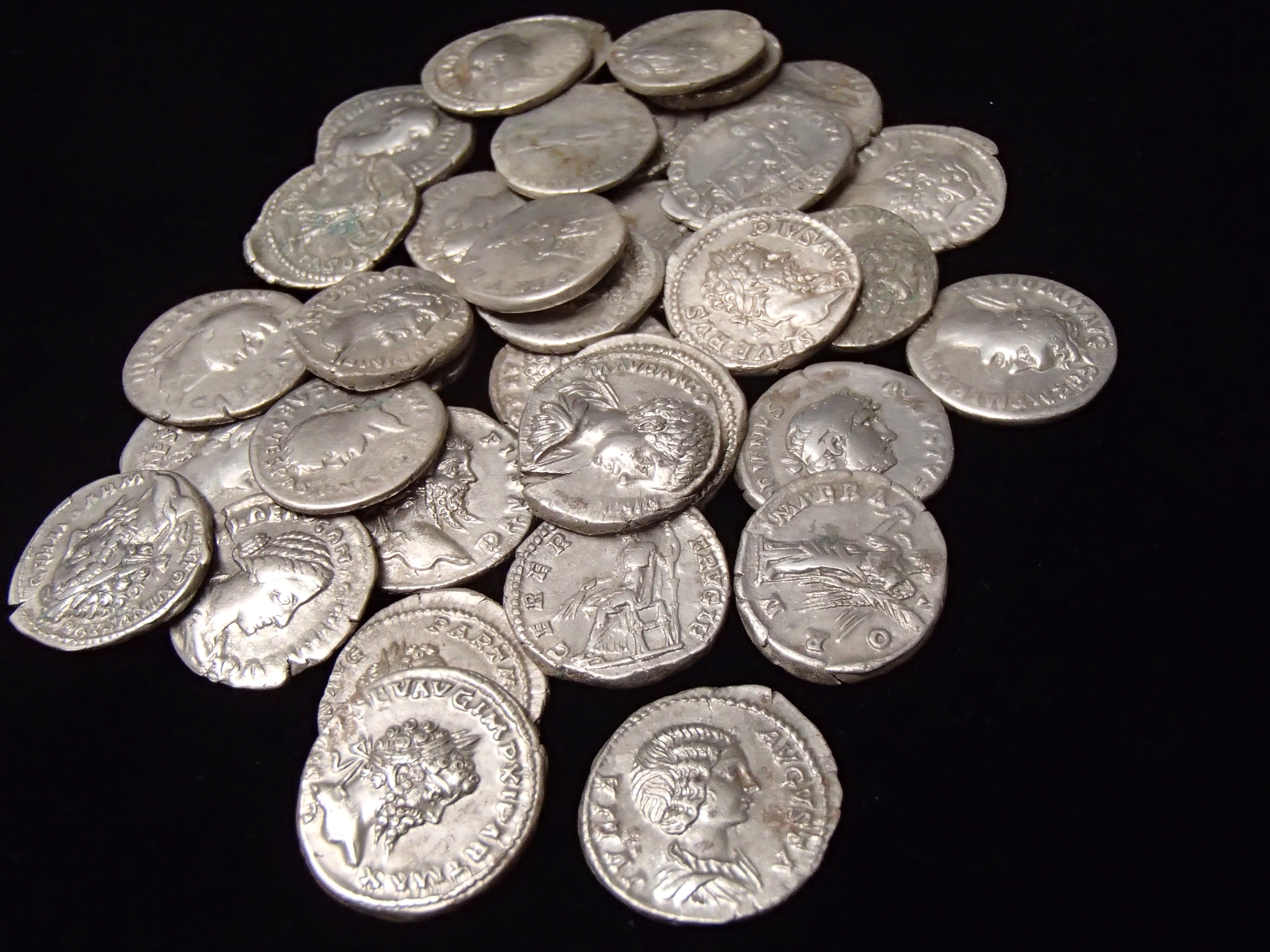
- Some of the Overton coins after chemical cleaning for ID, December 2016
- Material: Roman coins Roman pottery
- Size: 37 coins
- Created: c. 205
- Period/culture: Romano-British
- Discovered: September 2016; Overton, North Yorkshire, England
- Present location: Yorkshire Museum, York
- Identification: YORYM: 2018.154

The Overton Hoard is a Roman coin hoard dating from the early 3rd century AD. It contains 37 coins and fragments of a pottery container. It was acquired by the Yorkshire Museum in 2018.

== Discovery ==
The hoard was found by a metal detectorist on 21 September 2016 in a field near Overton, North Yorkshire.

== Contents ==
The hoard contains 37 silver coins, all of which are denarii. The coins date from the reign of Domitian while he was junior Emperor under his father Vespasian (AD 69–79), till the reign of Septimius Severus. The latest coin in the hoard dates to AD 205. Despite the wide date range, the coins could all have still been in circulation together in the early 3rd century. They were probably deposited in a ceramic vessel, of which only fragments were found. The vessel belonged to the Nene Valley Colour Coated Ware type.

Coins within the Hoard
Emperor/Issuer	Date	Number
Domitian Caesar	69–79	1
Titus	79–81	1
Domitian	81–96	1
Trajan	98–117	3
Hadrian	117–138	4
Antoninus Pius	138–161	3
Diva Faustina I		4
Marcus Aurelius	169–180	1
Divus Antoninus		1
Lucilla		3
Commodus	180–193	3
Septimius Severus	193–211	1
Clodius Albinus Caesar		1
Caracalla Caesar		1
Septimius Severus	198–209	5
Julia Domna	198–209	2
Caracalla	198–209	2

=== Gallery ===
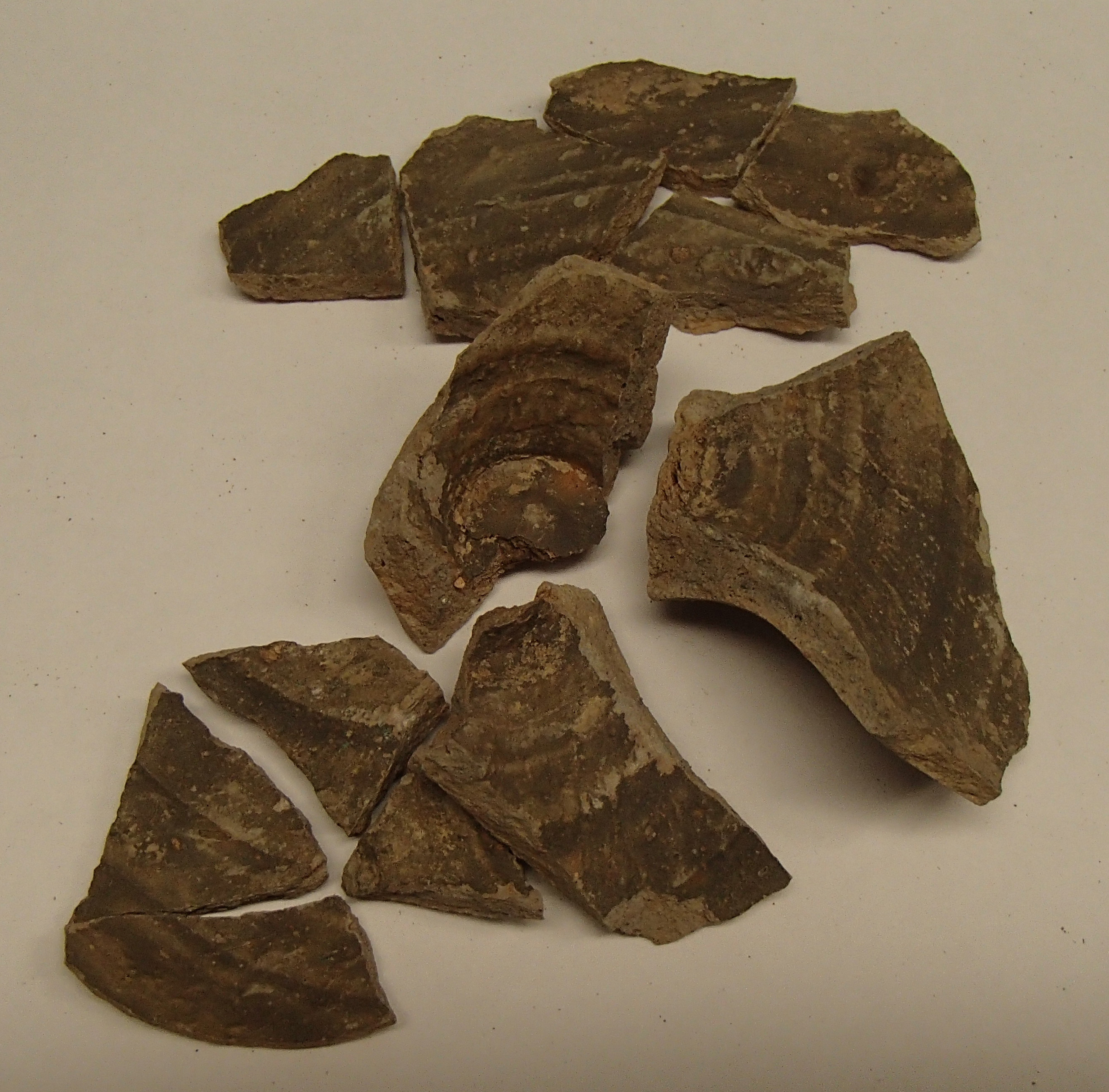
Ceramic fragments found with the hoard.

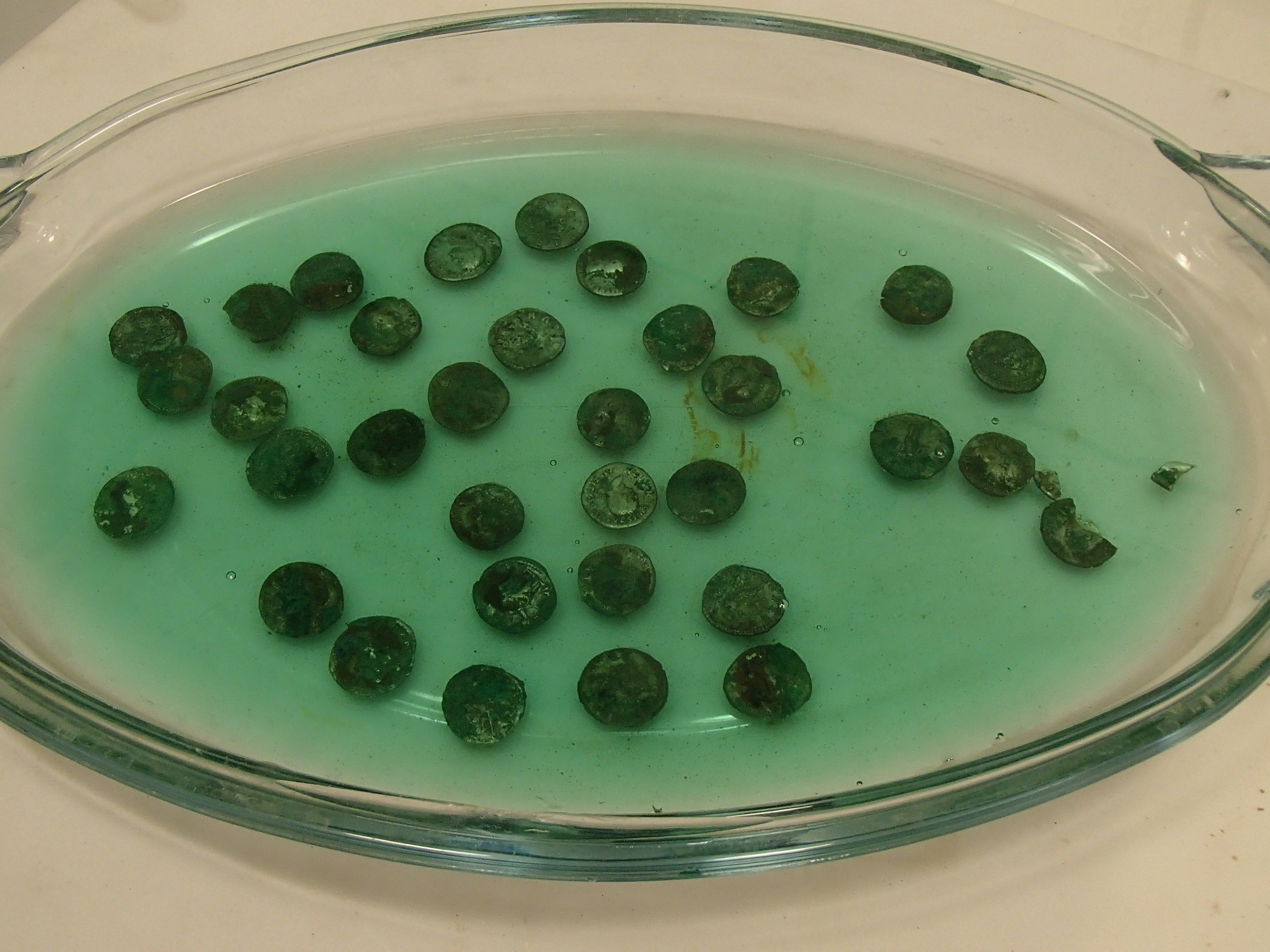
The coins being cleaned in 15% formic acid.

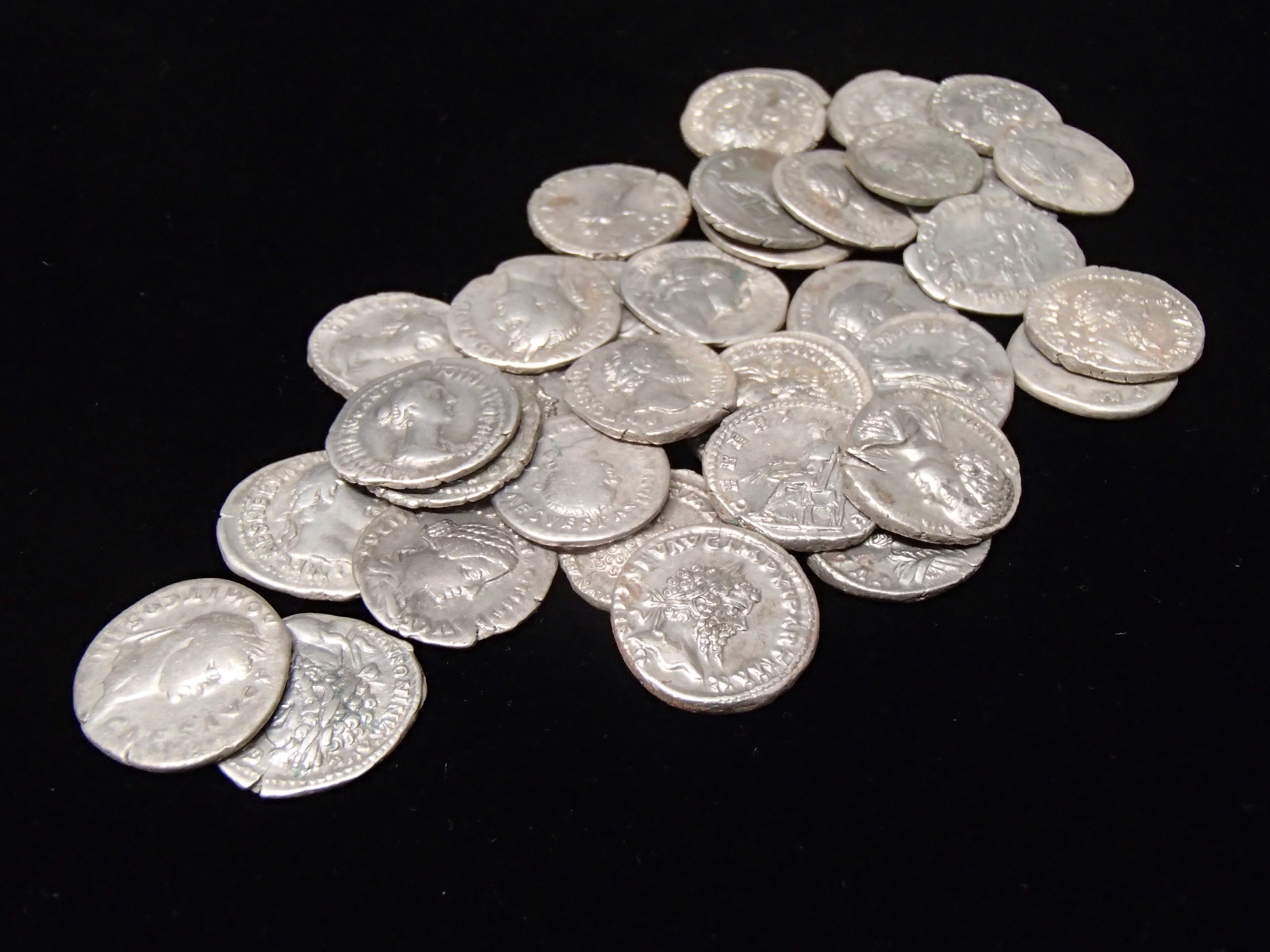
Some of the coins after cleaning

== Acquisition and display ==
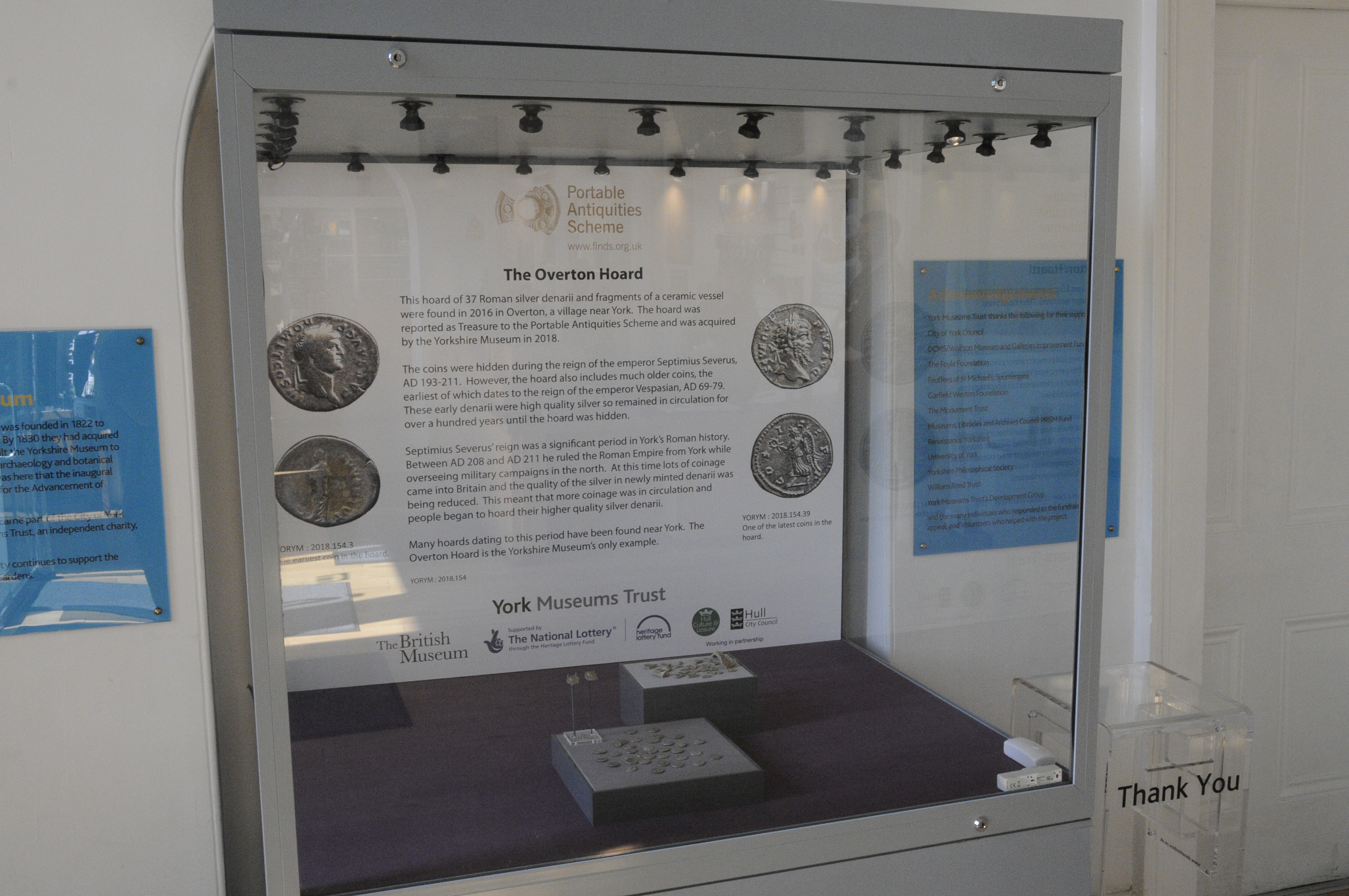
The Overton Hoard on display, Yorkshire Museum, July 2019

After being declared treasure, the hoard was acquired by the Yorkshire Museum in early 2018 and first went on public display in October 2018.
