= Wold Newton Hoard =

Coordinates: 54.133534°N 0.42510022°W

Wold Newton hoard
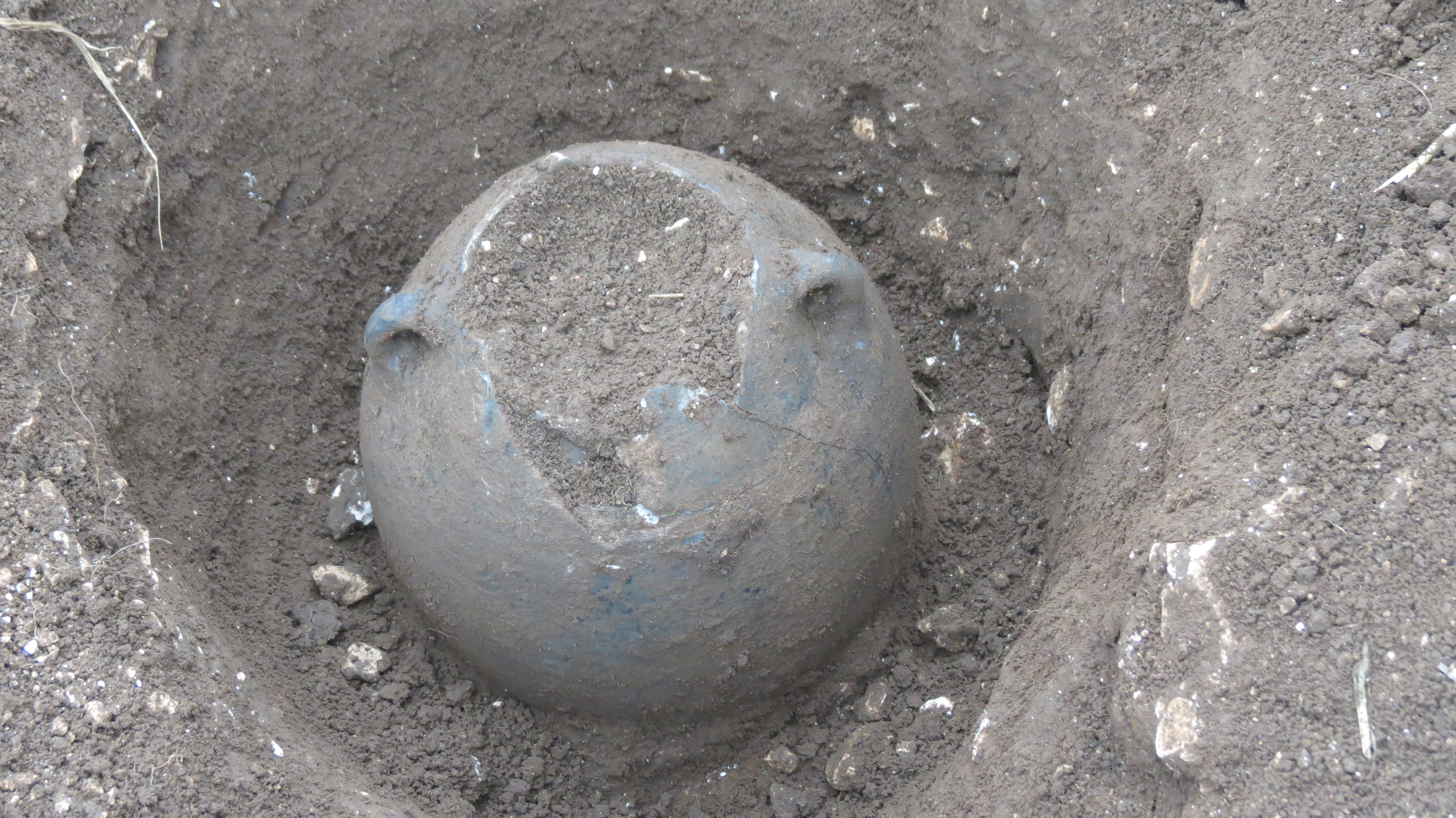
- Wold Newton hoard as it was found
- Material: Roman coins Roman pottery
- Size: 1,857 coins
- Created: 294-307
- Period/culture: Romano-British
- Discovered: 2014; Wold Newton, East Riding of Yorkshire England
- Present location: Yorkshire Museum, York

The Wold Newton Hoard is a coin hoard dating from the early 4th century AD. It contains 1,857 coins held within a pottery container. It was acquired by the Yorkshire Museum in 2016.

== Discovery ==
The hoard was found by metal detectorist David Blakely on 21 September 2014 in a field near Wold Newton in the East Riding of Yorkshire.

== Contents ==
The hoard contains 1,857 copper alloy coins all of which are nummi, except for a single radiate. The nummi all date from the period AD 294-307 and the radiate from AD 268–270. The coins were found within a grey-ware jar dating from the 4th Century. The coins and their container were found alongside a fragmentary dish and other fragments of pottery, one of which may have been used as a lid for the ceramic jar.

== Significance ==
The Wold Newton Hoard is the largest Roman hoard of its type ever discovered in the north of England.

== Acquisition and display ==
After being declared treasure, the hoard was valued at just over £44,200. The Yorkshire Museum ran a fundraising campaign (launched on 25 July 2016) to raise the money, which included donations from hundreds of people from around the world, £10,000 from the Arts Council/Victoria and Albert Museum Purchase Grant Fund and a donation of £9,981 from the American Friends of the Arts Fund. The hoard went on public display on 1 June 2017 in the Yorkshire Museum as part of the York Roman Festival.
