= Wade's Causeway =

Ancient site in North Yorkshire, England

- Wheeldale Roman Road; Goathland Roman Road; Auld Wife's Trod; Old Wife's Trod; The Skivick; Wade's Wife's Causey
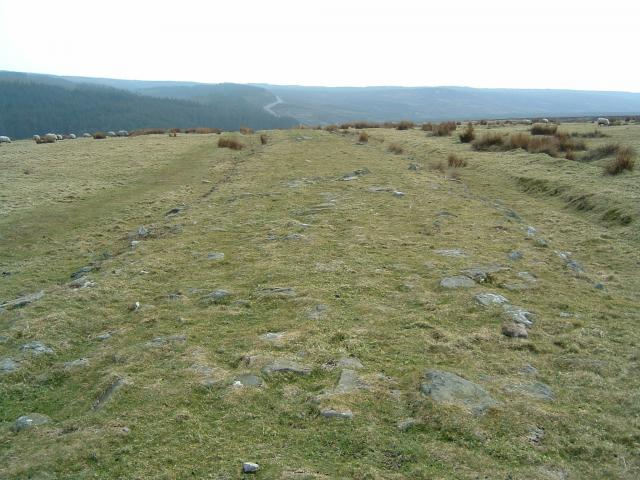
- Wade's Causeway, c. 2005

- Location within North Yorkshire
- 54.3706°N 0.7591°W
- Type: linear monument, possibly road or dike
- Periods: Variously contended to be Neolithic, Bronze Age, Iron Age, Roman or Medieval
- Location: Egton Parish, North Yorkshire, England

History
- Built: Uncertain
- Built by: Disputed
- Abandoned: Uncertain

Site notes
- Material: sandstone
- Length: between 1.2 and 25 miles (1.9 and 40.2 km)
- Excavation dates: 1912–1964 (not continuous)
- Archaeologists: James Patterson, Oxley Grabham, James Rutter, Raymond Hayes, J. Ingram, A. Precious, P. Cook
- Condition: ruined, overgrown, heavily robbed
- Owner: Duchy of Lancaster
- Management: North York Moors National Park Authority, in cooperation with English Heritage
- Public access: Yes

Scheduled monument
- Reference no.: 1004876
- UID: NY 309
- National Grid Reference: SE 80680 97870

Wade's Causeway is a Roman road, or possibly a Neolithic structure, located in the North York Moors national park in North Yorkshire, England. It was excavated in mid-20th century and dated to the Roman period, but 21st century re-interpretations have suggested a possible Neolithic origin. Its origins, age, purpose and extent are subject to research and debate and have not been reliably established.

The name may be used to refer specifically to a length of stone course just over 1 mile (1.6 km) long on Wheeldale Moor and protected as a scheduled monument. It may be also be applied more broadly to include an additional postulated extension of this structure, two sections of which are also scheduled monuments, and which extend to the north and south of Wheeldale for up to 25 miles (40 km). The visible course on Wheeldale Moor consists of an embankment of soil, peat, gravel and loose pebbles 2 feet 4 inches (0.7 m) in height and 13 to 23 feet (4 to 7 m) in width. The gently cambered embankment is capped with un-mortared and loosely abutted flagstones. Its original form is uncertain since it has been subjected to weathering and human damage.

The structure has been the subject of local folklore for several hundred years and possibly for more than a millennium. Its construction was commonly attributed to a giant known as Wade, a figure from Germanic mythology.

== Description ==
=== Situation and geology ===
The area through which the Wheeldale structure runs is predominantly uncultivated heather moorland. Hayes believes the area has remained fundamentally unchanged in appearance since the Bronze Age, when its forest cover was removed to permit cultivation and grazing. Wheeldale Moor is poorly drained in places making it susceptible to flooding in the ancient and modern eras. The underlying geology consists of patches of sand and gravel on top of mixed sandstone and oolitic limestone, known as Ravenscar Group strata.

=== Construction ===
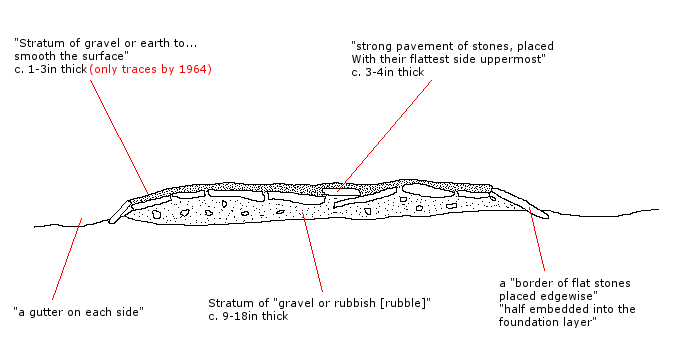
Cross-sectional diagram of Wade's Causeway, based on a description given in Young (1817) and Hayes and Rutter (1964)

The causeway's visible section on Wheeldale Moor shows the remains of a continuous surface metalled with closely fitted slabs of sandstone with flat upper surfaces. The average size of a slab is 45 centimetres (18 in) square, but some examples are 1.5 metres (4.9 ft) in breadth. One section of the causeway has a central ridge but the purpose of this feature is unknown. The stone flags are seated on a cambered base of mixed gravel, clay and either rubble, peat or soil, that forms a raised embankment. The embankment is from 3.6 to 7 metres (12 to 23 ft) wide at its raised surface. Its width in some sections is increased by 1 metre (3.3 ft) of ditch to either side, which may or may not be associated with its original construction, making an approximately uniform total width of 5 to 8 metres (16 to 26 ft). Its height above surrounding soil level is approximately 0.4 metres (1.3 ft).

Hayes and Rutter state that such an embankment's primary purpose would have been to provide good drainage for a road surface. Archaeologist David E Johnston states that the structure is crossed by numerous perpendicular drainage culverts with small becks trickling through them since the ground is often boggy. This could suggest a reason for the embankment, and its early attribution as a causeway—a route across the wetland, normally supported on earth or stone in the form of a raised embankment. Roman roads were commonly built on embankments which helped with drainage. Placenames that include 'causeway', and other elements such as 'ridge', may refer to the prominence of the road relative to the surrounding area. Some historians translate Livy's phrase for Roman military construction of roads, via munire, as "making a causeway".

Johnston, historian Nikolaus Pevsner and landscape historian Richard Muir all agree that an original gravel surface dressing was once present on top of the stone of the Wheeldale structure. Whereas Johnston and Pevsner believe that the gravel was washed away through weathering, Muir states that human agents were primarily responsible for its removal. Both agree that the stonework remaining does not represent the original road surface. Statements by the eighteenth-century antiquary Francis Drake and nineteenth-century topographer Samuel Lewis that the writers found it to be "paved with a flint pebble" may support this theory, although Hayes and Rutter cast doubt on the accuracy of Drake's reports. Nineteenth-century antiquarian Thomas Codrington states that in 1817 the causeway consisted of a "strong pavement of stones ... [with] above these another stratum of gravel ...", Hayes and Rutter state that "traces of a surface layer of gravel and small stones" remained visible in the 1960s, and professor of structural engineering John Knapton states that there remained some evidence of smaller surface-dressing pebbles as late as 1996.

Codrington and archaeologist Frank Elgee consider the structure was flanked in a few sections by lateral parallel ditches, but Hayes is doubtful whether they were part of the original construction or if they even existed.

=== Extant course ===
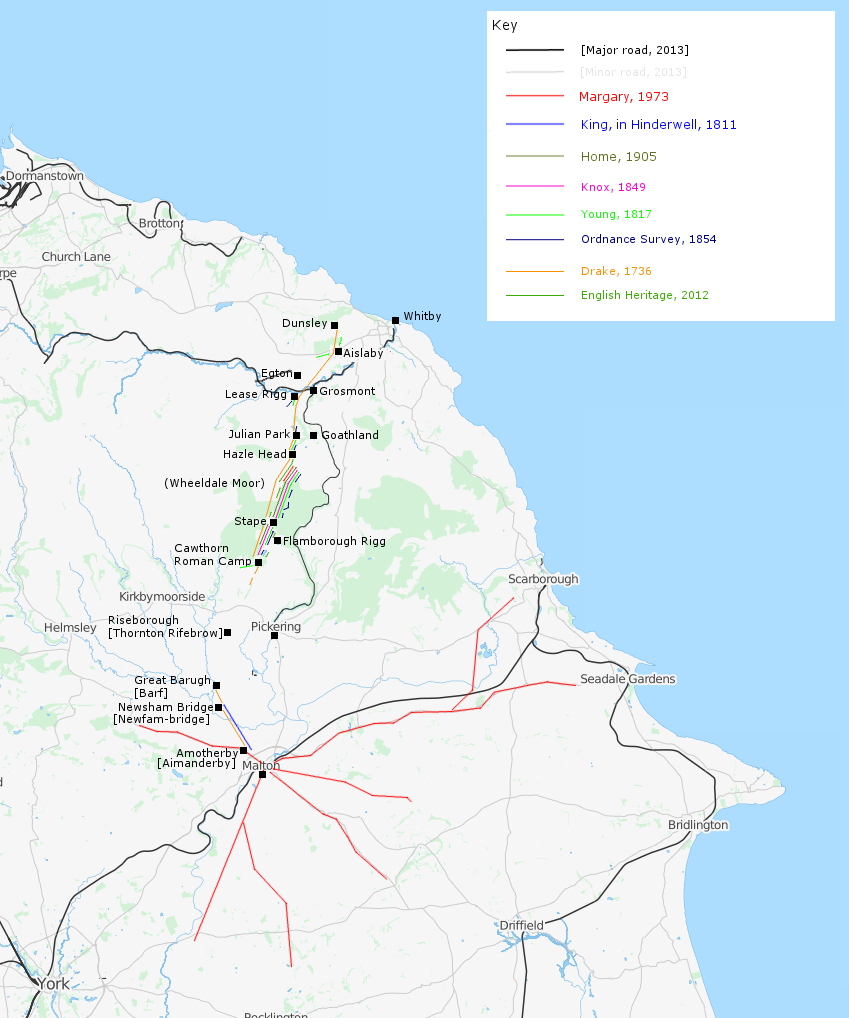
Map showing sections of Wade's Causeway reported as verified extant, by various authorities 1736–2013

The excavated portion of the Wheeldale structure—the only section of a postulated greater extent that remains clearly visible to the naked eye—consists of a 1.2 miles (1.9 km) section on the eastern edge of Wheeldale Moor, facing Howl Moor. It runs in an approximately north-northeasterly direction between grid reference SE 80344 97382 and SE 81077 98697 and is approximately 185 to 200 metres (607 to 656 ft) above sea level. The presence of large quantities of stone on a raised agger, and the absence of much vegetation on its surface make the presence of the structure indisputable along this section. The causeway's course is linear along its visible section on Wheeldale Moor, consisting of several short, straight sections that occasionally pivot onto new alignments in a way not clearly demanded by the landscape. In 1855, several overgrown fragments of the structure were also reported visible at several points in the vicinity: near Morley Cross; east of Keys Beck; near Hazle houses; at July Park; and Castle Hill.

=== Possible extended course ===
The structure is believed by several writers to extend far beyond its visible portion, but no significant sections of its conjectured course remain visible to the naked eye or have been excavated or extensively surveyed, and there is little agreement on an exact course that an extension may have taken. The total original length of the structure is therefore unknown but may have been up to 25 miles (40 km).

==== To the north ====
Early records of the causeway's course to the north—when its remains were apparently more readily visible than today—differ considerably from one another: the early geologist and natural historian George Young, who wrote concerning the causeway in his History of Whitby, makes no clear mention of the route of the structure north of Wheeldale Moor; it is unmarked on the 1854 Ordnance Survey map of the area, and eighteenth-century historian Thomas Hinderwell's mention of it passing near Hunt House suggests a greatly differing route to that marked on 2012 Ordnance Survey mapping. At least one source states that a "conjectural" continuation to the north is visible in vertical aerial photography. Hayes reports that in his survey in the 1950s, he found a "trace of the embankment" in one short section and "a patch of the metalling" in four additional sections along a route past Hazle Head and Julian Park.

Beyond Julian Park, it has been conjectured that the structure originally continued to the Roman garrison fort at Lease Rigg, southwest of Sleights, based on reports from antiquarians in the eighteenth and nineteenth centuries that fragments were visible at numerous points along this course. Hayes and Rutter appear confident of the structure's extent as far as Lease Rigg, but admit that its extent is conjectural from well short of that point, from Dowson Garth Quarry northwards.

Numerous authors have conjectured that the structure was a road that continued past Lease Rigg all the way to Roman coastal fortifications or signal stations somewhere near Whitby, but this is debated. Drake reports in 1736 that an associate had followed its course from Wheeldale Moor to the coast at Dunsley Bay. Still, Codrington is dismissive of his account, and it is unclear whether Drake meant to imply that a visible structure had been followed, or simply that the associate had followed a proposed route without encountering it. In either case, the author did not verify sight of the structure along this course himself. Several sources after 1805 report the same endpoint for the road, but it is unclear whether they are echoing Drake or had visited the site themselves. Several authorities state that any termini beyond Lease Rigg are "doubtful" and "unproven", and Elgee states that the causeway's northern course "is obscure and its termination unknown". Hayes and Rutter in 1964 found no evidence for a continuation of the structure any further north than Lease Rigg. Other authorities argue for possible courses extending northwards to Goldsborough, Guisborough, or Sandsend Bay.

==== To the south ====
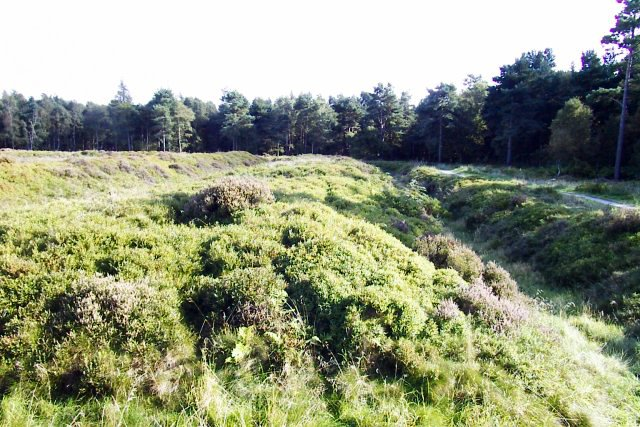
Surviving ditch and embankment in Cawthorne Roman Camp

It has also been suggested that the structure originally extended southwards from Wheeldale Moor to link up to the Roman Cawthorne Camp (sometimes spelt 'Cawthorn'). In the twentieth century English Heritage identified two sections of ground on Flamborough Rigg and Pickering Moor as extensions of the Wheeldale structure. Hayes states that the Flamborough Rigg section remained "clearly visible" as late as 1961, and that additional sections near Keys Beck were visible in aerial photography from 1946. The accounts of Hinderwell, Young, and Hayes & Rutter, as well as the 1854 and 2012 Ordnance Survey maps, appear to corroborate the stated course of the structure along this section.

There is further conjecture that the original structure's course may have continued beyond Cawthorne Camp to a Roman settlement recorded as Derventio Brigantum (possibly corresponding to the modern-day settlement of either Stamford Bridge or Amotherby near Malton). Any postulated extension further south than Cawthorne is contested. Hinderwell reports in 1811 that the late Robert King had found evidence of a continuation of the causeway between "Newsom-bridge" and Broughton (a former township located near Appleton-le-Street). Hayes and Rutter failed to find any trace of the causeway south of Cawthorne along a route via Amotherby, Barugh or Newsham in their survey in the 1950s, and note that its course could not be determined as early as 1726.

Beyond Malton, there is a postulated stretch of Roman road leading towards York, which may be an extension of the causeway. Evidence for it is very slim: Drake mentioned it in 1736, but Codrington could find no trace of it in 1903, and writes that there is "some uncertainty as to the connexion". Archaeologists Philip Corder and John Kirk reported a possible section of Roman road at Brandrith Farm (grid reference SE 698692) in 1928, but it is unknown whether this relates to the same structure as Drake observed, or has any association with the Wheeldale structure.

== History of interpretation ==
In the 1720s, the causeway was mentioned in a published text and as a result became more widely known for the first time. Within a few years, it became of interest to antiquarians, who visited the site and exchanged commentary on its probable historicity. They interpreted the structure as a causeway across marshy ground, attributing its construction to the Roman army, an explanation that remained largely unchallenged throughout the remainder of the eighteenth and nineteenth centuries.

The stretch of the causeway on Wheeldale Moor was cleared of vegetation and excavated in the early twentieth century by a local gamekeeper interested in archaeology. The historian Ivan Margary agreed with its identification as a Roman road. In the 1950s and 1960s the causeway was further excavated and studied by the archaeologist Raymond Hayes who concluded that the structure was a Roman road. In the late twentieth and early twenty-first centuries, its identification as a Roman road has been questioned by academics, and alternative interpretations suggested for its purpose and date of construction, including its possible origin as a neolithic structure up to 6,000 years old. The monument's co-manager, English Heritage, proposed several avenues of research in 2012 which might be used to settle some of the questions that have arisen regarding its origins and usage.

=== Legendary interpretations ===
Historians Hector Munro Chadwick and Nora K. Chadwick state that historiological explanations for ancient structures would have been known to educated clergymen from the seventh century onwards, but that structures were generally named by less educated people, often after mythological characters. Oral folklore in the North York Moors area from the Early Middle Ages has not generally survived into the modern era. Oral folklore held that the causeway was built by a giant called Wade for his wife to take her cow to either market or pasture. In 1890, historian Thomas Bulmer records that:

[Wade] is represented as having been of gigantic stature ... His wife ... was also of enormous size, and, according to the legend, carried in her apron the stones with which her husband made the causeway that still bears his name.

— Thomas Bulmer, 1890

The legend of Wade and his wife are reflected in alternative names for the structure that includes "Old Wife's Trod," "Auld Wife's Trod" and "Wade's Wife's Causey." The folklore of Wade was still common locally in the early nineteenth century.

=== Etymological history of early names ===
==== Causeway ====
Several of the earliest sources refer to the structure as "Wade's Causeway", "Wade's Causey", and "Wade's Wife's Causey". The word causeway derives from the earlier English causey way or simply causey. Causey derives from the Middle English cauci, which derives from the Anglo-French causee, itself derived from the Medieval Latin calciata ("paved highway"), which ultimately may derive from the Latin calx (meaning "heel"). The derivation from calx can most likely be explained by the practice in the Ancient Roman era of consolidating earthworks through trampling with the heel of the foot.

==== Wade ====
It is not known for certain who the causeway is named after. Still, the figure was at the latest pre-Renaissance, and the majority of sources agree that it has its origins in the medieval period or earlier. The name Wade appears as one of the most common surnames in 1381 poll tax register from Suffolk, and philologist P H Reaney reports multiple instances of it from the 11th and 12th centuries. The names Wade or Wada were common in pre-medieval English history and historian William Searle records around a dozen historic Wades in his Onomasticon of early Anglo-Saxon names. The earliest figure from the region identified as Wade in extant writings is Duke Wada, a historical personage of Saxon descent who is recorded in 1083 as having been a prominent figure living in the Yorkshire area around 798. It is possible that this person was either named after—or has been conflated over time with—one of several earlier, mythological figures known as Wade. The Chadwicks state that it is most probable that the causeway is named directly after a well-known mythological, rather than historical, Wada.

The earliest origins of tales relating to a mythological Wade are confused and diverse. Linguist George McKnight states that the epic of Wade, although becoming a "mass of tales ... of the most diverse origin imaginable", was one of only a few clear examples of an epic from the Early Middle Ages surviving into Middle English. Geoffrey Chaucer, writing in the fourteenth century, refers to early English legends of Wade. Still, these no longer exist in their complete form. Walter Map, writing in the twelfth century, also mentions a Vandal prince Gado (thought to be a Latin form of Wade) in his fantastical lay De Nugus Curialium.

The Wades in these early English works likely relate to one or earlier legendary figures known as Wade, or variations thereof, in Northern European folklore and legend. Various authors suggest links to the giant Vaði, (also known as Witege, Vathe, Vidia, Widga, Vidga, Wadi or Vade) mentioned in the Norse Saga of Bern in the Þiðrekssaga; the Danish hero Wate, also called Wada; the Anglo-Saxon deity Wōden (also Wōđanaz or Wōđinaz), who was historically referred to as "heaven's giant"; and the German figure Wa-te, a fierce sea-king similar to Neptune, who reigns in Sturmland in the 7th-century saga Kudrun. Nurse and the Chadwicks identify all the above figures as being later facets of a single legendary character present in early, shared mythology of tribes living around the rim of the Baltic and North Seas.

There are possible etymological links between Wade's causeway and other UK archaeological sites: the Wansdyke that runs between Wiltshire and Somerset; Wat's Dyke in the Welsh borders; and perhaps most significantly the relatively-local "Waddes Grave" at Mulgrave near Whitby: all three have pre-modern origins and two have sections contested as Roman in part.

==== Skivick ====
It is thought that Skivick or Skivik, the local name for the section of the structure visible on Wheeldale Moor, could derive from two morphemes from Old Norse. The first syllable could derive from skeið, which could mean either a track or farm road through a field, or from a word used to describe a course or boundary. The second syllable could derive from vík, meaning a bay or a nook between hills. Scandinavian or Norse place-names are common in Yorkshire and Norse peoples settled in the Yorkshire area from 870 AD onwards following raiding over the previous seventy years. Sawyer states that early Norse colonists had a profound effect on place-names in the areas in which they settled. Sedgefield states that the skeið derivation specifically in place-names within northern England points to a Scandinavian settlement of the area, but that due to the inheritance of language across generations, a place-name containing skeið may in any individual case have been applied any time between the ninth and fifteenth centuries. Historian Mary Atkin states that skeið place-names appear near Roman sites frequently enough to suggest an associative link.

== Investigations, surveys and excavations ==
=== Discovery and initial records ===
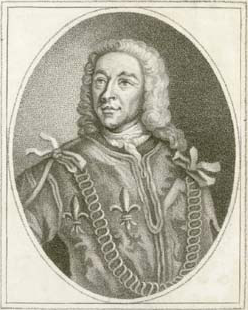
John Warburton, the first antiquarian to mention Wade's Causeway in a published work

The sixteenth-century antiquarian John Leland passed through the area in around 1539 when compiling his Itineraries of local English history and mentions the nearby and mythologically linked "Waddes Grave" – standing stones at Mulgrave near Whitby. He appears not to have had Wade's Causeway brought to his attention by local antiquarians since he makes no mention of it. In 1586, antiquarian William Camden makes passing note of the fact that, in parts of England, locals take "Roman fabriks to be the work of Gyants," but, although mentioned in the context of Roman roads, this appears to refer to the folklore of the time in general rather than to Wade's causeway specifically. He makes no mention of Wade's causeway by name, despite having toured the area, which—as Drake remarks in 1736—is "odd ... when he was upon the spot".

The first modern written record that unquestionably relates to the Wheeldale structure was in 1720 by the antiquarian John Warburton. This first publication of the structure's existence was followed by debate over the structure's function, course, and history amongst local historians and antiquarians in the eighteenth and nineteenth centuries, as its existence came to broader attention. In a private letter dating from October 1724, Thomas Robinson of Pickering states that approximately 6 miles (9.7 km) of the structure, which he describes as a road, were visible at that time, stretching south from Dunsley village:

I was surprised when I first mett with it distant about two miles from any town or dwelling, of the common stone of the countrey, fit enough for the purpose in a black springey rotten moor which continues about six miles to near the Sinus

Drake personally visited and examined the structure's length and incorporated its description into one of his published works (1736). The causeway was also mentioned in nineteenth-century publications by Walley Oulton (1805), Thomas Hinderwell (1811), George Young (1817), John Phillips (1853), Robert Knox (1855), George Bevan (1884), John Atkinson (1894) and Ralph Horne (1897); and in the twentieth century by Thomas Codrington (1903), Boyd Dawkins, A Austen (1903), Frank Elgee (1912,1923,1933), Kitson Clark (1935), Ivan Margary (1957), Hayes & Rutter (1964) and Nikolaus Pevsner (1966).

=== Pre-war excavations ===
The first recorded excavations of the structure are in the Victorian era. After performing some preliminary clearing of a part of the Wheeldale Moor section of the causeway in the 1890s, Wheeldale Lodge gamekeeper James Patterson persuaded the Office of Works (now the Department of the Environment) in 1912 to transfer into its stewardship the full 1.2 miles (1.9 km) stretch of the causeway over Wheeldale Moor. Working alongside Oxley Grabham from the York Museum, members of the Yorkshire Archaeological Society and several private individuals, Patterson cleared and excavated the adopted stretch of the causeway between 1910 and 1920. A further section, near Grosmont Priory, was excavated by Hayes between 1936 and 1939.

=== Post-war excavations and surveys ===
Historic England's PastScape website mentions further, minor excavations of small sections of the causeway in 1946 and 1962, and archaeologist Hayes relates extensive excavations that he carried out between 1945 and 1950 at Riseborough, Cawthorn, Flamborough Rigg, Lease Rigg, Grosmont Priory and to the west of Aislaby. This work was partly funded by the Council for British Archaeology, and his findings were published in an extensive study titled Wade's Causeway in 1964. The previous year, the course of the structure across Wheeldale was surveyed by the Whitby Naturalists Club. English Heritage have also published records of later survey works by the Royal Commission on the Historical Monuments of England (1981) and Plowman Craven and Associates (1984).

The Royal Commission on the Historical Monuments of England (RCHME) undertook a theodolite survey of the causeway in 1992, and some limited excavations and analysis were carried out in 1997 during maintenance work on the structure. The most recent published survey that has been performed is an aerial survey carried out in 2010/2011 by Archaeological Research Services (ARS) as part of English Heritage's National Mapping Programme.

=== Future archaeological work ===
Professor Pete Wilson, on behalf of English Heritage's Portico Properties Research Project, has suggested questions for future research and investigation of the site, including excavation to establish its date and function; examination of historical documentation for medieval mention of the use of the monument as a route or in a boundary dispute; and analysis of the site via a detailed aerial survey, lidar or other remote sensing technique to establish the extent of the monument beyond the length so far excavated.

== Theories on the structure's origins and purpose ==
A wide variety of interpretations for the structure have led, in the absence of any hard evidence, to a broad range of proposed dates for its construction, from 4,500 BC to around 1485 AD. In archaeological excavations, no coins or other artefacts have been found on or around the structure to aid its dating, and no evidence has been gathered as of 2013 through radiometric surveys. This has led to great difficulty in establishing even an approximate date for the causeway's construction. Attempts to date the structure have therefore relied on less precise means including etymology, the structure's probable relationship in the landscape to other structures of more precisely established date and function, and the comparison of the causeway's structure and fabrication to structures such as Roman roads.

=== As a Roman causeway ===
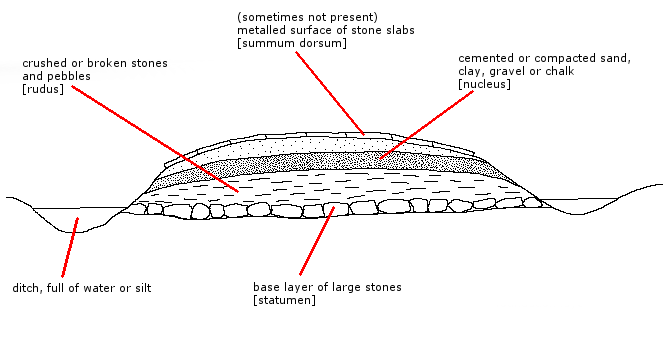
Cross-sectional diagram of an idealized Roman road from Britain, based on Weston (1919), Smith (2011) and other sources

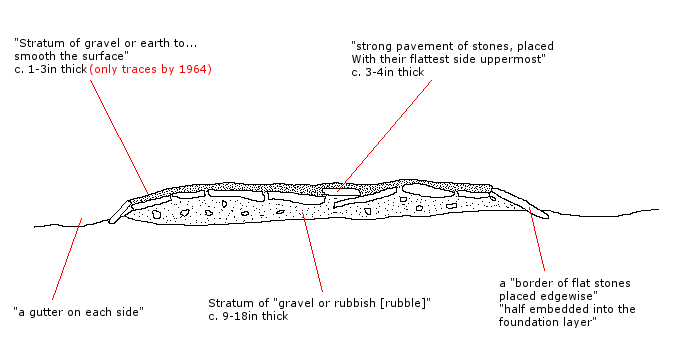
Cross-sectional diagram of Wade's Causeway, based on a description given in Young (1817) and Hayes and Rutter (1964)

The first antiquarians to discuss the site in the eighteenth and nineteenth centuries dismissed early folkloric explanations of its origins. Roman roads were of particular interest to eighteenth-century antiquarians, and they sought to explain the Wheeldale structure in the context of Roman activity in the North York Moors area in the first and second centuries AD. Specifically, they commonly suggested that the causeway was most probably constructed to connect the Roman Cawthorne Camp to the south with the Roman garrison fort at Lease Rigg near Grosmont to the north. The excavated section of the structure does lie linearly approximately between these two sites, which Knight et al. believe lends credence to its being of Roman origin. Historian John Bigland, writing in 1812, also states that there is no other plausible alternative for the structure's scale and method of construction than "Roman industry and labour".

One objection to identifying the road as Roman was that based on readings of the Iter Britanniarum—the section of the 4th-century Itinerary of Antoninus that lists major Roman roads and stations within Britain — there had never been any major Roman roads in the area. In 1817, Young attempted to address this problem by arguing that the course of one of the identified itinera (iter 1) had been misinterpreted and ran between Malton and Dunsley, passing through Wheeldale. Such an argument was possible because the Iter Britanniarum was not a map, but rather a list of roads and distances between various settlements, and used Roman names for settlements. Since many of these named sites had not been conclusively matched to contemporary settlements, identification of exact routes listed in the Iter was often difficult. There were few other objections at the time to the causeway's identification as a Roman road, and by the 20th century it was commonly being referred to as the "Wheeldale Roman Road" or "Goathland Roman Road".

There was also support for the identification of the structure as a Roman road on etymological grounds. The early 20th-century literary scholar Raymond Chambers argued that the name "Wade's causeway" is an example of Angle and Saxon settlers arriving in Britain and assigning the name of one of their heroes to a pre-existing local feature or area. Atkin reaches a similar conclusion, arguing that the Norse morpheme skeið (a partial root for Skivick, a local name for a section of the structure) is commonly found among Roman structures renamed by later Saxon or Viking settlers. Hayes and Rutter also identify the structure as a Roman road, but using a quite different etymological argument: they state that there is an absence among the names of settlements along the causeway of the Anglo-Saxon morphemes ceaster and stret and that, as per Codrington, these morphemes would be expected to be found in the names of several sites that lie alongside a former Roman road. They conclude that the absence of settlements with such names along the postulated extended course of Wade's Causeway indicates that the structure must already have been abandoned and of little significance by the Anglo-Saxon period (c. 400–600 AD), most likely by around 120 AD, and must therefore be of early Roman origin.

Several authorities who accepted the structure's interpretation as a Roman road attempted to make more precise estimates of the date of its construction by identifying periods of Roman military activity in the region, since most Roman roads were of military construction. Historian Albert Norman, writing in 1960, states that the Wheeldale structure most probably dates from either the first or fourth-century AD but most sources appear to favour the first-century date: both historian Brian Hartley and Hayes & Rutter estimate around 80 AD; and Elgee estimates 86 AD. The earlier, first-century estimates assume that the road is Roman and that Roman road-building in the region occurred around the time that Gnaeus Julius Agricola was the Roman governor of Britain. Agricola made a concerted effort to expand and consolidate Roman control over lands of the Brigantes tribes in the North York Moors area in the 80s AD and is thought to have ordered the construction of nearby Lease Rigg fort. The fourth-century estimates, by contrast, assume that the tribes in the North York Moors area were either bypassed or subdued in the first century but that, being of little importance strategically, their lands were not subject to Roman occupation or construction until the fourth century. A second wave of Roman military activity appears to have occurred in the region during this later period in response to new military incursions and raiding by Saxons, Picti, Scoti and Attacotti. The east coast of the North York Moors area formed the northern flank of the Saxon Shore defences believed to have been constructed against this perceived threat.

The above explanations all place the causeway within a Roman military context. An alternative, or perhaps secondary, usage for the causeway in Roman times is suggested by landscape author Michael Dunn and others, who state that it may have been constructed for the transport of jet inland from Whitby. Hayes and Rutter are dismissive, stating that the value of jet mined in the Roman period would not have justified the expense of the causeway's construction.

A possible issue with the causeway's identification as a Roman structure in the latter half of the 20th century was its incorporation of many small bends along its course. Roman military roads are usually straight in both their overall course, and also typically from one vantage point to the next. Both the Foss Way and the Stanegate, roads of established Roman provenance, have sinuous courses similar to Wade's causeway, so the objection is not conclusive.

The use of dressed stone rather than gravel as a surface dressing was occasionally held to cast doubt on the causeway's Roman provenance, since the majority of Roman roads that were finished with a material other than simply packed earth were dressed in either packed gravel or pebbles. There are other examples of Roman roads paved with stone blocks, including the 11 miles (18 km) section of the Via Appia — the oldest major Roman route in Italy — near Albano. Historians Richard A Gabriel and Michael Grant state that of the 400,000 kilometres (250,000 mi) of known Roman roads, over 80,000 kilometres (50,000 mi) may have been stone-paved. The Roman writer Ulpian specifically differentiates between a via munita, which always had a paved stone surface, and a via glareata, an earthed road with either a gravelled surface or a gravelled subsurface with paving on top. The causeway may well have had a gravel surface originally, which has disappeared due to robbing and natural weathering. Another difference in construction detail between Wade's Causeway and a typical Roman road is its lack of a foundation of large stones. Codrington and archaeologist John Ward stress that the structure of Roman roads varied greatly depending upon their situation and the materials available, especially within Britain.

For much of the 20th century, the consensus remained that the road was most probably Roman. It was still referenced as an undoubted Roman road in a 1947 UK Government report. In 1957 Margary, the leading authority on Roman roads at the time, accepted the road as Roman and assigned it the catalogue number 81b in his list of Roman roads in Britain. In the late 1950s and early 1960s, this was a definitive and unquestioned interpretation of the monument. Several works in the 1980s and 1990s stated that Roman-era road construction was still the most probable explanation of the structure.

=== As a pre-Roman road ===
Whilst nineteenth- and to a lesser extent twentieth-century attitudes often suggested that any well-constructed pre-modern road surface must be Roman, late-twentieth-century archaeologists were more open to evaluating the structure within the context of a wider span of historical periods. After an early allowance by Phillips in 1853 that the causeway could be British rather than Roman there was a little further investigation of such a possibility. In 1994, the Royal Commission on the Historical Monuments of England began reviewing the date of origin for the Wheeldale causeway. Detailed air photography of the Cawthorne camps in 1999 site failed to find evidence of a road leading towards Wheeldale Moor from the camps to which it is historically related and the causeway does not obviously connect to the main Roman road network. Several writers around the turn of the millennium began to express doubt about the established narrative for the structure as a Roman road. Twenty-first-century archaeologists then found several exemplars of other cambered, metalled roads that pre-date the Roman presence in Britain, and hence set precedence for the possibility of a pre-Roman origin for the Wheeldale causeway. Several sources from the mid-1990s onwards have suggested that the structure may be a pre-Roman (Iron Age) road of uncertain route or purpose.

=== As a post-Roman (medieval) road ===
Blood and Markham (1992) have proposed an interpretation of the structure as a post-Roman (medieval) road, possibly relating to the wool trade. However, this is harder to reconcile chronologically with etymological explanations for the structure's naming. English Heritage states that it is "quite possible" that the causeway was used as a road during the medieval period despite being built much earlier. Similarly, Hartley, whilst accepting the structure as a Roman military road, believes it is unlikely that the causeway immediately fell out of use once its military use ceased. Drake recorded that by 1736 the causeway was "not now made use of," but there is no historical record covering its possible use as a road during the medieval period.

=== As a Neolithic boundary structure ===
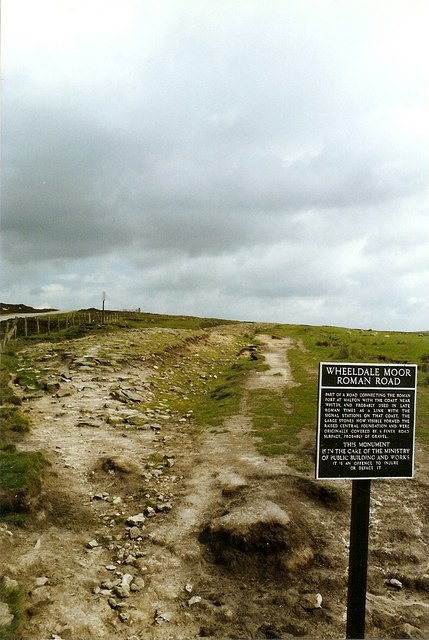
The original sign, pictured in 1991, states that the structure is a Roman road, whereas new signage installed in 1998 acknowledges that the origin and purpose of the structure are unknown.

There are some objections to the interpretation of the structure as being a road at all, including the fact that several burials cists along the structure's course protrude through its surface by up to 0.4 m (1.4 ft), highly unusual for a road surface. Since 1997, authorities, including English Heritage, have accepted the possibility that the structure may not be a road. Archaeological consultant Blaise Vyner suggested in 1997 that the structure may be the collapsed and heavily robbed remains of a Neolithic or Bronze Age boundary wall or dyke. There are other Neolithic remains on the North York Moors, including boundary dikes, although Knight et al. report that the later Neolithic is very poorly represented archaeologically in the North York Moors area and neolithic use of the moors was likely very limited in extent. Bronze Age presence in the moors, including earthworks, is well represented generally in the archaeology of the area, and therefore is a more plausible origin. Evidence against the identification of the causeway as an early Neolithic structure includes the statement by Elgee in 1912 that the causeway had been identified as cutting across an earlier British earthwork just north of Julian Park, suggesting that it must post-date it. One possibility that could explain several of the anomalies in trying to identify the site definitively is the suggestion by Knight et al. that it was commonly observed practice in the area for dykes to be reused as trackways.

The term "Wheeldale Linear Monument" was introduced in the 2010s to refer to the structure to account for the uncertainty regarding the structure's original function. English Heritage in 2013 stated that the balance of opinion had swung to favour a prehistoric, rather than Roman, the origin for the structure. As of 2013, the uncertainty regarding the monument's purpose and origin is reflected by the information board at the end of the Wheeldale section of the structure, where it meets the modern road.

=== Significance of uncertainty over the structure's origin ===
If Wade's Causeway is conclusively determined to be other than a Roman road, it would not be the only example of a long-standing misattribution of ancient structures as Roman roads. The most famous example is the Blackstone Edge Long Causeway, which was once acclaimed as one of the finest surviving Roman roads in Britain. Research by the Greater Manchester Archaeological Unit found that the Blackstone Edge road was most probably a turnpike dating from around 1735.

== Site management in the modern era ==
The surviving section of the causeway on Wheeldale Moor was reported by 1903 to be overgrown with heather and buried in up to a foot of soil. After being cleared of debris and overgrowth during excavations from 1910, it was by 1920 "stripped ... of the growth of turf and heather and ... clear for miles". The Office of Works then employed a labourer to keep the section of the causeway on Wheeldale Moor clear of vegetation, an arrangement that appears to have survived after that organisation's change to the Ministry of Works in 1943 and later absorption into the department for the Environment in 1970. Johnston states that the site was still maintained in 1979, but by 1994 the visible section of the causeway had been left to be covered by vegetation once more.

Hayes and Rutter state that the greater postulated portion of the structure beyond that visible on Wheeldale Moor is difficult to trace due to its having been greatly damaged over the years by natural erosion, which they state has destroyed some sections. The structure as a whole has also been greatly damaged both deliberately and inadvertently by humans. As Ward writes, it is often the fate of historic structures such as roads to have "been levelled by the plough and plundered of their materials". There are specific mentions of damage to the causeway through ploughing, tree felling, the laying of water mains, attempts to clear vegetation and even, in the twentieth century, by the activity of both tracked and armoured vehicles. The structure has also been heavily and deliberately robbed of stone for use in local construction, such as roads, dry-stone walls, dikes and farm buildings, this robbing continuing from 1586 through to at least the early twentieth century. Young, writing in 1817, laments the robbing of stone from the causeway for use in the construction of a modern field boundary, writing:

pernicious ... contemptible ... our venerable military causeway has been unmercifully torn up ... It is almost enough to break the heart of an antiquary, to see a monument that has withstood the ravages of time for 16 centuries wantonly destroyed, to erect a paltry dike

— George Young, 1817

A shift in attitudes and increasing awareness of the structure's historical significance led to a gradual shift from destruction to preservation in the late nineteenth and early twentieth centuries. English Heritage states that limited repair work or alterations on the structure were likely carried out in the nineteenth century, but exact details are unclear. In 1913 the Wheeldale structure was brought under legal protection from robbing and deliberate damage, when its conservation was guaranteed under the Ancient Monuments Consolidation and Amendment Act. In 1982, a proposal was made to re-cover the majority of the exposed section with topsoil to protect it from further damage, but this has not been carried out as of 2013. There was some further, limited maintenance of some sections between 1995 and 1997 to control water erosion, in addition to major erosion repair at the southern end of the structure in 1997.

There has been at least one report of deliberate vandalism to the structure. Still, the primary concern relating to visitors to the site is the possibility of damage caused through tread wear. The site is not heavily trafficked, and any wear to the structure since the 1980s would likely be mitigated by the protection from the natural re-establishment of plant growth over its surface. Updates by the North York Moors National Park Authority and English Heritage suggest that natural weathering and grazing sheep represent greater erosion risks to the structure than do human agents.

As of 2013, the site is managed by the North York Moors National Park Authority, in cooperation with English Heritage, through a Local Management Agreement. English Heritage does not man the site and permits free access at any reasonable time. The site receives up to a thousand visitors per month.

== In fiction ==
Scottish Author Michael Scott Rohan drew on the legend of Wade's Causeway, as well as wider English, Germanic, and Norse mythology, when he wrote his Winter of the World trilogy while living in Yorkshire. The books feature mention of a legendary giant, Vayde, who ordered a causeway to be built across the marshes.

== Photographs (1912–1985) ==
Wade's Causeway, c. 1912

Wade's Causeway, c. 1918

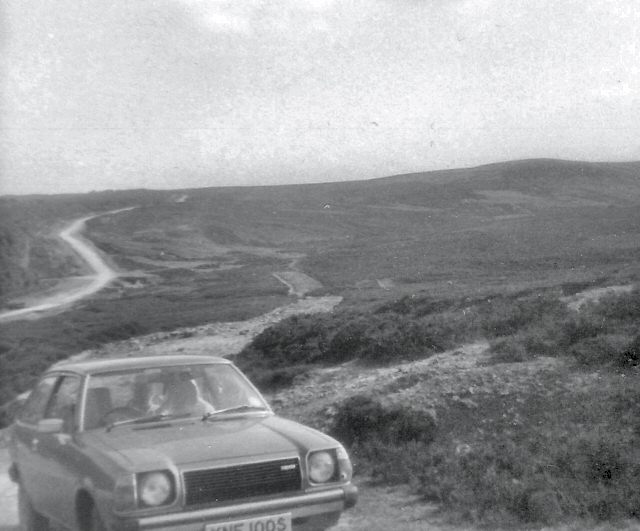
Wade's Causeway, c. 1978

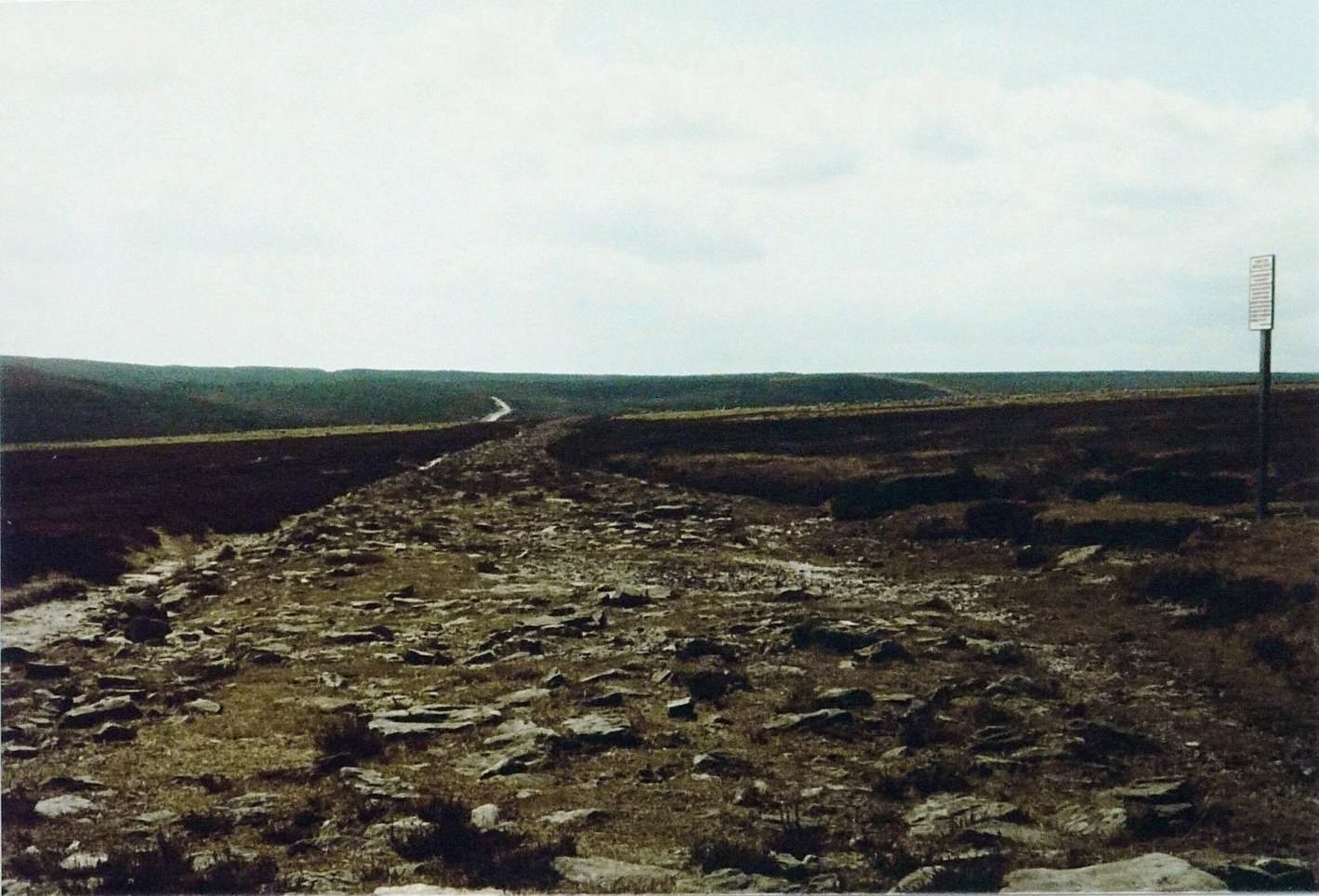
Wade's Causeway, c. 1985

== References and footnotes ==
=== Explanatory notes ===
α.The Roman Dunu[m|s] Sinus, which Young and Drake place at Whitby, and Hinderwell and Calvert suggest may be either the village of Dunsley, or the bay just north east of it.
β.Blaise Vyner classifies the structure as Neolithic, which would place its earliest possible construction date at around 4,500 BC. English Heritage suggest that it could be a medieval road. A traditional date for the medieval period is around 1066–1485, from the Battle of Hastings to the Battle of Bosworth Field (see for example the title of Saul's "Companion to Medieval England 1066–1485"), putting 1485 as the latest possible date of construction.
γ.Camden refers to a common practice of locals "digging sand out of [the Roman roads]".
δ.See Davidson and Hayes. Hayes and Rutter describe its Roman provenance as "undoubted".
ε.Hayes and Rutter find fault with Drake's description of the road's width, materials, and course.
ζ.See Elgee, Hayes, Codrington, and WNC Annual Report for 1956. The word "trod" is a general term in the North York Moors area for historical paths and trails: see Unsworth, Atherden, and Evans.
η.See Young, Hayes and Lee. Knapton states that the slabs are of dolomitic limestone, but all other sources state that the slabs are sandstone.
θ.Witcher points out that not all Roman roads should be thought of as arrow straight paved highways, and that "many were winding, unpaved, pre-existing routes". This is seconded by Ward.
ι.See, for example, Hayes, who describes it as "swampy and ill-drained" and attributes the perpendicular drainage culverts to this; also Ward, and Proceedings of the Cleveland Naturalists Field Club (1903–1904). There is some disagreement: Lang describes the North York Moors landscape during the Roman period as "arid".
κ.Several sources attest to the notion that Roman roads were predominantly straight: see, for example, PastScape, Gagarin. and Codrington. Codrington states further that there are examples of Roman roads that do not deviate more than a quarter of a mile from a direct line over a 30 miles (48 km) course. Likewise, Davies states that at least one Roman road differs from a straight-line course between its termini by less than one degree over its entire course.
λ.See Wade, Clarke, Chadwick, and Bjork. Chadwick notes that the practice of attributing ancient structures to Dietrich von Berne or one of his associates was particularly common by German travellers of the Middle Ages.
μ.See Hinderwell, Drake, Davidson and Murray. Dillon says the legend involves sheep, but all other sources agree on it being cows.
ν.English Heritage states that "It has been assumed that the road is Roman, being carefully built and well-engineered".
Δ.See Hayes and English Heritage website.
Ε.See Unsworth and English Heritage website.
Θ.See Codrington, Young, and Austen. Exact reported width varies from one source to another, presumably depending on whether they are measuring the surviving stonework only, or include one or both of the total agger width and the ditches on either side. Margary claims a width of 27 feet for the agger.
Ι.See Darvill, Pevsner, Barker, Mattingly, Elgee, Price, Knapton, Muir, Brown and Bigland.
Κ.See Atkinson, Hartley and PCNC (1901).
Λ.See Historic England website.
Μ.See Muir, Barker, Bevan, Price, Weston and Heritage Trail website.
Ν.See Codrington and WNC Annual Reports (1956).
Ο.See English Heritage and Heritage Trust websites and WNC Annual Report (1994).
Π.See Hinderwell and Hayes.
Ρ.See Knox, Young and Home.
Σ.See Hayes and Young.
Τ.See Codrington and Home.
Υ.See Lee, PastScape website and WNC Annual Reports (1995, 1996, 1997).
Φ.See Lee and WNC Annual Report (1996).
Χ.See Ward and WNC Annual Report (1994).
Ψ.See WNC Annual Report (1995) and NYMNP Wordpress blog.
Ω.See Codrington and BBC Countryfile website.
Ϊ.See Heritage Explorer website and WNC Annual Report (1956).
Ϋ.See Pastscape, Archaeological Research Services. and English Heritage websites.
ά.See Hayes and WNC Annual Report (1956).
ή.See WNC Annual Report (1956) and English Heritage website. Margary and Yorkshire Archaeological Society annual reports state that the work continued 1912–1915 only, but several other sources mention a break in work during the first world war.
ί.See Lee and the PastScape website.
ΰ.See Hayes, Williams and Selkirk.
ϊ.See Williams Heseltine (2005) and Birmingham Roman Roads Project website.
ϋ.See Gabriel and Grant.
ό.See Codrington and Ward.
θ.See Unsworth, PastScape and English Heritage websites, and WNC Annual Report (1997).
ϒ.See Anttila, Johnson, Atkin and Sedgefield for definitions and commentary on the origins and alternative meanings for skeid.
ΐ.See Online Etymology Dictionary, Johnson, Heath and Sedgefield for discussion of vik.
ϔ.See Schleifer and Oxford English Dictionary.
Ϙ.See, for example Hindle and Welfare.
ϙ.Hayes declares that he "failed to disclose any definite traces ... in the neighbourhood of Amotherby and Newsham", found "no definite evidence ... in the vicinity of Little Habton and Great Barugh", and "no concrete evidence" between Riseborough Hill and the Cawthorn Camps.
Ϛ.See, for example, Chambers Codrington, and Hayes for etymological discussions of the various names for the structure, and their impact on an understanding of its likely date of construction.
ϛ.See, for example, Hinderwell, Bigland, Young Knox and the Pastscape website for evaluations of the structure as a Roman road in connection with Cawthorn Roman camps.
Ϝ.See, for example, discussions in Johnston and on the English Heritage website.
Ϟ.See, for example, statements by both Margary (1973) and Wilkinson (2007).
ϟ.See, for example, Brown (1948), Ormsby-Gore (1951), and Pevsner (1966).
Ϡ.See brief mentions given in Barker as well as Patterson's letter stating his position.
ϡ.See attributions to the duchy in Vyner, Beardsall, Hayes and Rutter, and Barker.
Ϣ.See Hayes and Rutter (1964). Hartley (1993), as well as secondary cite in Barker (1977).
ϣ.See both the Heritage Gateway and PastScape websites for mention of the Blood/Markham study.
Ϥ.See Skivick spelling and attribution in Hayes (1964) and Skivik spelling and attribution in Hayes (1988).
Ϧ.See varying estimates in Lewis, Hayes, and Hawkes.
ϧ.See, for example, Brown and Sheehan/Whellan.
Ϩ.See Hayes (1964) and Elgee (1933).
κ.See, for example, Dunn (1986) and Hartley (1993).
ρ.See, for example, Chadwick & Chadwick 1932, p. 285 and Reaney & Wilson 2006, p. 3264
϶.See, for example Shotter (2005), Hartley (1993) and Elgee (1930), the latter whom suggests also Agricola's predecessor Cerealis.

== Bibliography ==
=== Printed books ===
- Arnold, Thomas, ed. (1882). Symeon of Durham's Historia Regum Anglorum et Dacorum, Vol. II.
- Atherden, Margaret (1992). Upland Britain: A Natural History. St Martin's Press. ISBN 0-7190-3493-0.
- Atkinson, John (1894). Memorials of Old Whitby. Macmillan and co.
- Atkinson, John Christopher (1891). Forty Years In a Moorland Parish: Reminiscences and Researches in Danby in Cleveland. Macmillan and Co.
- Barker, Malcolm (1977). Yorkshire: The North Riding. Batsford.
- Bjork, Robert E., ed. (2010). The Oxford Dictionary of the Middle Ages. Oxford University Press. ISBN 978-0-19-866262-4.
- Brown, Alfred (1948). Broad Acres: A Yorkshire Miscellany. Country Life.
- Bulmer, Thomas (2002) [1890]. History, Topography and Directory of North Yorkshire. S and N Publishing. ISBN 1-86150-299-0.
- Burchfield, Alex, ed. (1987). Oxford English Dictionary. Clarendon Press. ISBN 0-19-861212-5.
- Camden, William (1722). Edward Gibson (ed.). Britannia, or a Geographical Description of Great Britain and Ireland. University of Adelaide.
- Chambers, Raymond (1921). Beowulf: An Introduction to the Study of the Poem With a Discussion of the Stories of Offa and Finn. Cambridge University Press. OCLC 220983832.
- Clarke, M. G. (1911). Sidelights on Teutonic History During the Migration Period. Cambridge University Press.
- Codrington, Thomas (1903). Roman Roads In Britain. Society for Promoting Christian Knowledge.
- Darvill, Timothy; Stamper, Paul; Timby, Jane (2002). England: An Oxford Archaeological Guide to Sites from Earliest Times to AD 1600. Oxford University Press. ISBN 0-19-285326-0.
- Davies, Hugh (2009). Roman Roads In Britain. Osprey Publishing. ISBN 978-0-7478-0690-5.
- Dillon, Paddy (2005). The North York Moors: A Walking Guide. Cicerone. ISBN 1-85284-448-5.
- Drake, Francis (1736). Eboracum: Or a History of the City of York. William Bowyer.
- Elgee, Frank (1923). The Romans in Cleveland. Hood and Co.
- Elgee, Frank (1912). The Moorlands of North-Eastern Yorkshire : Their Natural History and Origin. A Brown and Sons.
- Elgee, Frank (1933). The Archaeology of Yorkshire. Methuen.
- Elgee, Frank (1930). Early Man in North-east Yorkshire. John Bellows.
- Evans, Chris (2008). Trods of the North York Moors: A Gazetteer of Flagged Paths. Scarborough Archaeological and Historical Society. ISBN 978-0-902416-09-3.
- Fellows, Arnold (1954). The Wayfarer's Companion: England's History in Her Buildings and Countryside. Oxford University Press.
- Frere, Sheppard (1987). Britannia: A History of Roman Britain (3rd ed.). Routledge & Kegan Paul. ISBN 0-7102-1215-1.
- Gabriel, Richard (2002). The Great Armies of Antiquity. Praegar.
- Geake, Helen; Kenny, Jonathan (2000). Early Deira: Archaeological Studies of the East Riding in the Fourth to Ninth Centuries AD. Oxbow Books.
- Grant, Michael (1978). History of Rome. Charles Scribner. ISBN 9780684159867.
- Great Britain. Department of the Environment (1976). List and map of historic monuments in the care of the state open to the public. HM Stationery Office. ISBN 9780116707826.
- Grimm, Jacob (2004). Teutonic Mythology. Vol. 1. Courier Dover Publications. ISBN 978-0-486-43546-6.
- Hayes, Raymond; Rutter, James (1964). Wade's Causeway: A Roman Road In North-East Yorkshire. Scarborough and District Archaeological Society.
- Hayes, Raymond (1988). Wilson, PR (ed.). North-east Yorkshire Studies: Archaeological Papers. Roman Antiquities Section, Yorkshire Archaeological Society. ISBN 0-902122-54-1.
- Inman R (1988). "Romano-British settlement in the South Tees Basin". In Wilson PR, Price J (eds.). Recent Research in Roman Yorkshire: Studies in Honour of Mary Kitson Clark. British Archaeological Reports British Series. Vol. 193. ISBN 9780860545552.
- Johnston, David (1979). An Illustrated History of Roman Roads in Britain. Spurbooks. ISBN 0-904978-33-8.
- Johnston, David (2002). Discovering Roman Britain. Shire Publications. ISBN 978-0-7478-0452-9.
- Knox, Robert (1855). Descriptions, Geological, Topographical, and Antiquarian, in Eastern Yorkshire, Between the Rivers Humber and Tees. London: Printed for Robert Knox. hdl:2027/hvd.32044081200842.
- Leland, John (1907). Toulmin Smith, Lucy (ed.). The Itinerary of John Leland: In Or About the Years 1535–1543. George Bell and Sons.
- Margary, Ivan (1955). Roman Roads in Britain: Vol. I: South of the Foss Way—Bristol Channel. Phoenix House Ltd.
- Margary, Ivan (1973). Roman Roads in Britain. J. Baker. ISBN 0-212-97001-1.
- Mattingly, David (2006). An Imperial Possession: Britain in the Roman Empire, 54 BC – AD 409. Penguin Group. ISBN 0-14-014822-1.
- Muir, Richard (1997). The Yorkshire Countryside: A Landscape History. Keele University Press. ISBN 978-1-85331-198-7.
- Murray, John, ed. (1882). Handbook for Travellers in Yorkshire. John Murray.
- Ormsby-Gore, William, ed. (1951). Illustrated Regional Guides to Ancient Monuments under the Ownership or Guardianship of His Majesty's Office of Works. H. M. Stationery Office.
- Page, William (1923). A History of the County of York North Riding: Volume 2. The St Catherine Press. ISBN 978-0-7129-0610-4.
- Poulter, John (2010). The Planning of Roman Roads and Walls in Northern Britain. Amberley. ISBN 978-1-84868-548-2.
- Price, J., ed. (1988). Recent Research in Roman Yorkshire, studies in honour of Mary Kitson Clark. BAR British Series. Vol. 193. British Archaeological Reports. doi:10.30861/9780860545552. ISBN 0-86054-555-5.
- Rohan, Michael Scott (1998). The Castle of the Winds. Orbit Books. ISBN 1-85723-570-3.
- Sawyer, Peter (2001). The Oxford Illustrated History of the Vikings. Oxford Paperbacks. ISBN 0-19-285434-8.
- Selkirk, Raymond (1995). On The Trail of the Legions. Anglia Publishing. ISBN 1-897874-08-1.
- Smith, William (1890). A Dictionary of Greek and Roman Antiquities. J. Murray.
- Wade, Stuart C. (1900). The Wade Genealogy. Stuart C. Wade.
- Warburton, John (1720). A New and Correct Map of the County of York in All its Divisions. James Wyld.
- Woolf, Alex (2007). From Pictland to Alba 789–1070. Edinburgh University Press. ISBN 978-0-7486-1234-5.
- Wormwald, Patrick (1991). "Scandinavian Settlement". In John; Wormwald; Campbell (eds.). The Anglo-Saxons. Penguin.
- Young, George (1817). A History of Whitby, and Streoneshalh Abbey. Clark and Medd.

==== Online access ====
- Algeo, John (2010). The Origins and Development of the English Language (6th ed.). Heinle Languages. ISBN 978-1-4282-3145-0 – via Google Books.
- Anttila, Raimo (2000). Greek and Indo-European Etymology in Action: Proto-Indo-European. John Benjamins. ISBN 90-272-3707-7 – via Google Books.
- Bevan, George Phillips (1884). Tourist's guide to the East and North riding of Yorkshire – via Google Books.
- Bigland, John (1812). The Beauties of England and Wales: or, Original Delineations, topographical, historical, and descriptive, of each county. Vol. XVI: Yorkshire. Printed by Thomas Maiden, for Vernor and Hood and 6 others – via HathiTrust.
- Chadwick, Munro; Chadwick, Nora (1932). The Growth of Literature: Volume 1. Cambridge University Press. ISBN 9781108016148 – via Google Books.
- Chambers, Raymond (1912). Widsith: A Study in Old English Heroic Legend. Cambridge University Press. ISBN 978-1-108-01527-1 – via Google Books.
- Dunn, Michael (1986). Walking Ancient Trackways. David & Charles. ISBN 0-7153-8640-9 – via Google Books.
- Edlin, Herbert Leeson (1963). North Yorkshire Forests. H.M. Stationery Office – via Google Books.
- Fox, Adam (2000). Oral and Literate Culture in England, 1500–1700. ISBN 9780191542299 – via Google Books.
- Gagarin, Michael (2010). The Oxford Encyclopedia of Ancient Greece and Rome, Volume 1. Oxford University Press. ISBN 9780195170726 – via Google Books.
- Hawkes, Jacquetta (1951). A guide to the prehistoric and Roman monuments in England and Wales. Chatto & Windus – via Google Books.
- Heseltine, John (2005). Roads to Rome. Frances Lincoln Limited. ISBN 9780892368273.
- Hinde, Hodgson (1868). Symeonis Dunelmensis Opera Et Collectanea, Volume 1. Andrews and Co.
- Hinderwell, Thomas (1811). The History And Antiquities of Scarborough and the Vicinity. Thomas Wilson and Son. ISBN 1-4589-1892-0 – via Internet Archive.
- Hindle, Paul (1998). Roads and Tracks of the Lake District. Cicerone. ISBN 1-85284-259-8 – via Google Books.
- Hours, Francis (1994). Atlas des Sites du Proche Orient. Maison de l'Orient Méditerranéen. ISBN 9782903264710 – via Google Books.
- Lang, James (2001). Corpus of Anglo-Saxon Stone Sculpture, Volume VI: Northern Yorkshire. Oxford University Press. ISBN 0-19-726256-2 – via Google Books.
- Lawrence, Richard (2010). Roman Britain. Shire Publications. ISBN 9780747807780 – via Google Books.
- Lewis, Samuel (1831). A Topographical Dictionary of England: Comprising the Several Counties, Cities, Boroughs.., Vol 2. S Lewis and Co – via Internet Archive.
- Lukis, William, ed. (1887). The Family Memoirs of the Reverend William Stukeley MD and the Antiquarian and Other Correspondence of William Stukeley, Roger & Samuel Gale (PDF). Surtees Society. ISBN 1-4588-7532-6 – via Internet Archive.
- Mattingly, David (2007). An Imperial Possession: Britain in the Roman Empire, 54 BC – AD 409. London: Penguin Books. ISBN 978-0-14-014822-0 – via Internet Archive.
- Nichols, Mary Pickering (2007). Gudrun, A Medieval Epic. Houghton, Mifflin and company – via Internet Archive.
- Oulton, Walley (1805). The Traveller's Guide: Or, English Itinerary, Volume 1. James Cundee – via Google Books.
- Pearson, Andrew (2002). The Roman shore forts: coastal defences of southern Britain. Tempus. ISBN 1-4282-3145-5 – via Google Books.
- Pevsner, Nikolaus (1966). The Buildings of England: Yorkshire: The North Riding. Penguin Books – via Google Books.
- Phillips, John (1853). The Rivers, Mountains, and Sea-coast of Yorkshire. John Murray – via Internet Archive.
- Reaney, P.; Wilson, M. (2006). A Dictionary of English Surnames. Routledge, Chapman and Hall. ISBN 0-203-99355-1 – via Google Books.
- Searle, William George (1969). Onomasticon Anglo-Saxonicum; a List of Anglo-Saxon Proper Names From the Time of Beda to that of King John. Hildesheim, G. Olms – via Internet Archive.
- Sedgefield, W. (1915). The Place Names of Cumberland And Westmorland. University of Manchester – via Internet Archive.
- Sheehan, J. J.; Whellan, T. (1855). History and Topography of the City of York; The Ainsty Wapentake; and the East Riding of Yorkshire. Vol. 1. John Green – via Internet Archive.
- Sheehan, J. J.; Whellan, T. (1859). History and Topography of the City of York; and the North Riding of Yorkshire. Vol. 2. John Green – via Google Books.
- Shotter, David (2005). Roman Britain. Taylor & Francis. ISBN 0-203-98190-1 – via Google Books.
- Titus Livius Patavinus (1890). S. G. Campbell (ed.). Livy. Vol. XXVII. Cambridge University Press – via Google Books.
- Turner, Joseph Horsfall (1890). T. Harrison (ed.). Yorkshire genealogist and Bibliographer. Vol. 2 – via Google Books.
- Turner, Sharon (1840). The History of the Anglo-Saxons: From the Earliest Period to the Norman Conquest. Vol. 1. Baudry – via Google Books.
- Vyner, Blaise (1995). Moorland Monuments: studies in the archaeology of north-east Yorkshire in honour of Raymond Hayes and Don Spratt. Council for British Archaeology. ISBN 9781872414553 – via Google Books.
- Ward, John (1911). The Roman Era in Britain. Methuen & Co – via Lacus Curtius: Into the Roman World.
- Welfare, Humphrey (1992). The Buildings of England: Northumberland: Roman Northumberland. Penguin Books. ISBN 0300096380 – via Google Books.
- Weston, William (1919). The North Riding of Yorkshire. Cambridge University Press – via Internet Archive.
- Westwood, Jennifer (1985). Albion: Guide to Legendary Britain. HarperCollins Canada, Limited. ISBN 9780246117892 – via Google Books.
- Williams, Brenda (2004). The Romans In Britain. Jarrold. ISBN 9781841651279 – via Google Books.

=== eBooks ===
- Camden, William (1607). Britannia, or a Geographical Description of Great Britain and Ireland. Archived from the original on 11 April 2012 – via University of Adelaide.
- Heath, Ian; McBride, Angus (1985). The Vikings (PDF). Osprey. ISBN 0-85045-565-0.
- Home, Gordon (2005). The History of Pickering: The Evolution Of An English Town. Blackthorn Press. ISBN 1-906259-17-8 – via Project Gutenberg.
- Norman, Albert (1960). The Romans In East Yorkshire (PDF). East Yorkshire Local History Society. Archived from the original (PDF) on 28 December 2013.

=== Journals and technical papers ===
- Atkin, Mary (1978). "Viking race-courses? The distribution of skeið place-name elements in Northern England". Journal of the English Place-Name Society. 10. English Place-Name Society: 26–39.
- Bowden GR, Balaresque P, King TE, Hansen Z, Lee AC, Pergl-Wilson G, Hurley E, Roberts SJ, Waite P, Jesch J, Jones AL, Thomas MG, Harding SE, Jobling MA (2008). "Excavating Past Population Structures by Surname-Based Sampling: The Genetic Legacy of the Vikings in Northwest England". Molecular Biology and Evolution. 25 (2). Oxford University Press: 301–309. doi:10.1093/molbev/msm255. PMC 2628767. PMID 18032405.
- Corder, Philip; Kirk, John (1928). "Roman Malton: a Yorkshire Fortress and its Neighbourhood". Antiquity. 2 (5). The Antiquity Trust, Durham University: 69–82. doi:10.1017/S0003598X00001332. S2CID 162582802.
- Davidson, H. R. Ellis (1958). "Weland the Smith". Folklore. 69 (3). Taylor & Francis: 145–159. doi:10.1080/0015587X.1958.9717140. JSTOR 1258855.
- Knapton, John (June 1996). "The Romans And Their Roads – The Original Small Element Pavement Technologists" (PDF). Proceedings of the Fifth International Conference on Concrete Block Paving.
- McKnight, George H. (1900). "Germanic Elements in the story of King Horn". Publications of the Modern Language Association of America. 15 (2): 221–232. doi:10.1632/456615. S2CID 164170444.

=== Printed newsletters ===
- Austen, A. (1903). "Eighty-First Report of the Whitby Literary and Philosophical Society". Reports of the Whitby Literary and Philosophical Society. 81. Whitby Literary and Philosophical Society.

=== eJournals, brochures and technical papers ===
- Heath-Coleman, Phillip (October 2012). "A Tale of Wade: The Anglo-Saxon Origin Myth in an East Saxon Setting". The Heroic Age (15).
- Lee, Graham (August 1997). "Pink Elephants Over Wheeldale" (PDF). East Riding Archaeological Society News (45). East Riding Archaeological Society. Archived from the original (PDF) on 4 October 2013.
- Malim, Tim (2011). Pitts, Mike (ed.). "The Roman road that was". British Archaeology. No. 120. The Council for British Archaeology. Archived from the original on 21 February 2013.
- Pearson; Price; Tanner; Walker (1985). "The Rochdale Borough Survey, Appendix I" (PDF). The Greater Manchester Archaeological Journal. 1. University of Manchester Greater Manchester Archaeological Unit.
- Smith, Nicky (2011), Pre-industrial Roads, Trackways and Canals (PDF), Introductions to Heritage Assets, English Heritage, archived from the original on 4 July 2011
- Vyner, Blaise (November 1997). "Roman Roads". British Archaeology. 29. The Council for British Archaeology.
- Wentersdorf, Karl (April 1966). "Chaucer and the Lost Tale of Wade". The Journal of English and Germanic Philology. 65 (2). University of Illinois Press: 274–286. JSTOR 27714841.
- Witcher, Rob (September 1997). "Roman Roads That Reshaped The Land". British Archaeology (27). The Council for British Archaeology.
- Oswald, Al (2011), Prehistoric Linear Boundary Earthworks (PDF), Introduction to Heritage Assets, English Heritage, archived from the original on 4 July 2011
- Patterson, James (1907). "The Papers of Sir Mark Sykes (1879–1919)". Hull University Archives.
- "Visit to Roman Road" (PDF). Annual Reports of the Whitby Naturalists Club. Whitby Naturalists Club. September 1955.
- "The Archaeology Report 1994" (PDF). Annual Reports of the Whitby Naturalists Club. Whitby Naturalists Club. 1994.
- "The Archaeological Report 1995" (PDF). Annual Reports of the Whitby Naturalists Club. Whitby Naturalists Club. 1995.
- "Review of Archaeological Work in the National Park" (PDF). Annual Reports of the Whitby Naturalists Club. Whitby Naturalists Club. 1996.
- "Recent Archaeological Work in the North York Moors National Park 1997" (PDF). Annual Reports of the Whitby Naturalists Club. Whitby Naturalists Club. 1997.
- "Recent Archaeological Work In The North York Moors National Park 1998" (PDF). Annual Reports of the Whitby Naturalists Club. Whitby Naturalists Club. 1998.
- "In The Beginning" (PDF). Annual Reports of the Whitby Naturalists Club. Whitby Naturalists Club. 2004.
- "Yorkshire Archaeological Society Annual Report 1982". Yorkshire Archaeological Society Annual Reports. Yorkshire Archaeological Society. 1982.
- "England and Wales: Preservation and Record" (PDF). Transactions of the Historic Society of Lancashire and Cheshire. LXV. Ballantyne, Hanson & Co. 1914. Archived from the original on 20 October 2013.
- Fowler, J. Cowley, ed. (1913). "Work of the Sections" (PDF). Proceedings of the Cleveland Naturalists Field Club, 1910–1911. III. A Brown and Sons.
- Elgee, Frank (1909). Fowler, J. Cowley (ed.). "Moorland Research in 1909" (PDF). Proceedings of the Cleveland Naturalists Field Club, 1908–1909. II. Jordison and Co.
- Hawell, John (1901). "Obituary: Canon Atkinson, MA, DCL" (PDF). Proceedings of the Cleveland Naturalists Field Club, 1899–1900.
- Hawell, John (1909). Fowler, J. Cowley (ed.). "History of Easby" (PDF). Proceedings of the Cleveland Naturalists Field Club, 1903–1904. II. T Woolston.
- Calvert, J. (1920). "Cleveland In English History" (PDF). Proceedings of the Cleveland Naturalists Field Club, 1914–1919. Jordison & Co.
- Schleifer, Robert (2012). "The Transmutation of Language". Word Ways. 22 (1). Butler University.
- Knight, David; Sutcliffe, Tara-Jane; Bax, Samantha (May 2011). North York Moors National Mapping Programme and Assessment: Aerial Survey Mapping Summary Report (Report). Archaeological Research Services. doi:10.5284/1055892.
- Johnson, E. B., ed. (1913). "Some Scandinavian Names" (PDF). The Minnesota Alumni Weekly. XIII (9). University of Minnesota.
- Hobhouse, Arthur Lawrence, ed. (1947). "Report on National Parks and Reserves". Great Britain. Ministry of Housing and Local Government. National Parks Committee (England and Wales). HM Stationery Office.
- "Scarborough and District Archaeological Society Research Report". Scarborough and District Archaeological Society Research Reports (4). Scarborough and District Archaeological Society. 1964.
- "Review: North-East Yorkshire by Gordon Home". The Academy and Literature. 66. P.G. Andrews. 1904.
- Mozley, R. F. (1919). Strahan, A. (ed.). "Recollections of an Ordnance Surveyor". The Contemporary Review. 116.
- Walford, Edward; Cox, John Charles; Apperson, George Latimer, eds. (1915). "Proceedings of Archaeological Societies". The Antiquary. 51. Elliot Stock.
- Hartley, Brian (1993). "Military Activity". In Spratt, D. A. (ed.). Prehistoric and Roman Archaeology of North-East Yorkshire (PDF). CBA Research Report. Vol. 87. Council for British Archaeology. ISBN 1-872414-28-1.
- Freeman, Edward (1870). "The Origin of the English Nation". The Living Age. CVII. Littell And Gay.
- Sarantis, Alexander; Christie, Neil (2013). "Fortifications in the West: A Bibliographic Essay". War and Warfare in Late Antiquity. Late Antique Archaeology. Vol. 8. Brill. pp. 255–296. doi:10.1163/9789004252585_008. ISBN 978-90-04-25257-8.
- Powell, John (2012). "A Building Stone Atlas of North Yorkshire East and York". Strategic Stone Study. British Geological Survey.
- "Minerals Technical Paper" (PDF). North York Moors National Park Authority. 2013. Archived from the original (PDF) on 18 December 2013.

=== Online newspapers ===
- Morris, Steven (15 March 2011). "Britannia Superior: Why Roman Roads May Not Be Quite As Roman As We Think". Guardian News and Media.
- Wilson, Pete (30 May 2000). "Obituaries: Raymond Hayes". Guardian News and Media.
- Unsworth, Owen (16 August 2004). "On The Trail of The Living Moors". The Northern Echo.
- Harrison, Linda (6 December 2012). "Wheeldale Roman Road, North Yorkshire". BBC CountryFile Magazine. British Broadcasting Corporation. Archived from the original on 23 September 2013.
- Beardsall, Jonny (3 August 2012). "What price a grouse moor?". The Telegraph. Telegraph Media Group Limited.
- Wilkinson, George (24 November 2007). "Country Walks: Wheeldale". Gazette & Herald. Newsquest (Yorkshire & North East).

=== Miscellaneous websites ===
- "Heritage Explorer: Wheeldale Roman Road, nr Stape, North Yorkshire". English Heritage, Heritage Explorer, Images for Learning. English Heritage. 2003.
- "Ivan D Margary FSA, His legacy to Roman History". Felbridge & District History Group. 2011.
- "Birmingham Roman Roads Project: Construction of a Roman Road". Birmingham Roman Roads Project. Birmingham Roman Roads Project, Centre for Lifelong Learning, The University of Birmingham. Archived from the original on 6 October 2014.
- "The Heritage Trust: The Wheeldale Roman Road". The Heritage Trust. 7 September 2012.
- "The Heritage Trail: Wheeldale Roman Road, North Yorkshire". The Heritage Trail.
- "Special Projects – An Historic Environment Update". North York Moors National Park Authority. 14 April 2013.
- Historic England. "Wades Causeway (1012169)". Research records (formerly PastScape).
- Historic England. "Wade's Causeway, North Yorkshire: Investigation History (1012169)". Research records (formerly PastScape).
- Historic England. "Wade's Causeway (1012426)". Research records (formerly PastScape).
- Historic England. "Goathland Roman Road, On Wheeldale Moor (1004876)". National Heritage List for England.
- Historic England. "Two sections of Roman road on Pickering Moor (1004108)". National Heritage List for England.
- Historic England. "Two sections of Roman road on Flamborough Rigg (1004104)". National Heritage List for England.
- "English Heritage: Days Out: Properties: Wheeldale Roman Road – main page". English Heritage Days Out – Properties. English Heritage.
- "English Heritage: Days Out: Properties: Wheeldale Roman Road – Research". English Heritage Days Out – Properties. English Heritage.
- "English Heritage: Days Out: Properties: Wheeldale Roman Road – History". English Heritage Days Out – Properties. English Heritage.
- "Description of Wheeldale Roman Road". English Heritage.
- "English Heritage: Days Out: Properties: Wheeldale Roman Road – Significance". English Heritage Days Out – Properties. English Heritage.
- "Broughton Parish: Our History". Ryedale District Council Web Services.
- "Causey". Merriam-Webster.com Dictionary. Merriam-Webster.
- "Causeway". Merriam-Webster.com Dictionary. Merriam-Webster.
- "Wat's In A Name". Wansdyke Project 21.
- "Wansdyke and the Roman Road". Wansdyke Project 21.
- "NORTH YORK MOORS NMP". English Heritage.
- "Wades Causeway". Heritage Gateway.
- "North York Moors".
- "925040". English Heritage.
- "MP/WHE0002". English Heritage.
- "Viking". Online Etymology Dictionary.
- Uckelman, Sarah L. (11 December 2012). "Index of Names in the 1381 Suffolk Poll Tax" (PDF).
