= Peter Wilson =

Peter or Pete Wilson may refer to:

== Pete Wilson ==
- Pete Wilson (baseball) (1885–1957), American baseball pitcher
- Pete Wilson (born 1933), American politician, former governor of California
- Pete Wilson (broadcaster) (1945–2007), San Francisco Bay Area TV and radio personality
- Pete Wilson (historian) (born 1957), British historian specialising in Roman archaeology

== Peter Wilson ==
=== Music ===
- Peter Wilson (singer) (born 1973), Australian singer
- Peter Wilson (musician) (born 1971), Northern Irish musician, also known as Duke Special
- Peter Wilson (record producer), British record producer

=== Sports ===
- Peter Wilson (Australian rules footballer) (born 1963), Australian rules footballer
- Peter Wilson (cricketer, born 1907) (1907–1986), New Zealand cricketer
- Peter Wilson (cricketer, born 1944), Zimbabwean-born South African cricketer
- Peter Wilson (curler) (born 1961), Scottish-Irish curler
- Peter Wilson (field hockey) (1942–2024), British Olympic hockey player
- Peter Wilson (footballer, born 1904) (1904–1983), Scottish international footballer
- Peter Wilson (soccer, born 1947), English-born captain of the Australian national soccer team
- Peter Wilson (footballer, born 1996), Liberian footballer
- Peter Wilson (sailor) (born 1960), Zimbabwean sailor
- Peter Wilson (ski jumper) (born 1952), Canadian former ski jumper
- Peter Wilson (American soccer), Scottish-born American soccer player in the 1890s and early 1900s
- Peter Wilson (sport shooter) (born 1986), British sport shooter
- Peter J. D. Wilson (born 1955), Scottish and Irish curler and coach

=== Other ===
- Peter Wilson (bishop) (1883–1956), bishop of Moray, Ross and Caithness
- Peter Wilson (architect) (born 1950), Australian architect
- Peter Wilson (writer) (born 1951), Australian writer and commentator
- Peter Wilson (murder victim) (1952–1973), Northern Irish kidnap victim; one of the "Disappeared"
- Peter Wilson (diplomat) (born 1968), British ambassador
- Peter Wilson (auctioneer) (1913–1984), English auctioneer, chairman of Sotheby's
- Peter H. Wilson (born 1963), British historian of German and European history
- Peter John Wilson (1869–1918), Australian architect
- Peter Lamborn Wilson (1945–2022), American political writer, essayist, and poet
- Peter Wilson (theatre director) (1951–2023), English theatre director and producer
- Peter Wilson or Wa-o-wa-wa-na-onk (died 1871), Native American physician and Cayuga leader

== See also ==
- Peta Wilson (born 1970), Australian actress known for TV series Nikita
