= Jennifer Price =

Archaeologist, glass expert

Jennifer Price FSA
- Died: 16 June 2019 (aged 78–79); York, England
- Occupations: Academic and archaeologist

Academic background
- Education: Cardiff University
- Thesis: Roman Glass in Spain

Academic work
- Discipline: Classics and archaeology
- Sub-discipline: Roman glass
- Institutions: British Museum; Salisbury Museum; Cardiff University; University of Leeds; Durham University

A. Jennifer Price FSA (1940 – 16 May 2019) was an archaeologist and academic, specialising in the study of Roman glass. She was professor emerita in the department of archaeology at Durham University.

== Early life and education ==
Price was born in 1940, and was from a family of glassmakers in Stourbridge. She initially attended evening classes in archaeology whilst at secondary school and excavated with Graham Webster in her free time.

== Career ==
She briefly left archaeology, working for the civil service before qualifying as a barrister in 1963. From 1963 to 1966 she worked on excavations in Italy and Masada, Israel. Whilst at Masada she learned how to reconstruct and study Roman glass vessels.

She subsequently gained her bachelor's degree in archaeology from Cardiff University in 1969. From 1969 to 1972, Price was in Spain undertaking her PhD research into Roman glass. She was awarded her PhD in 1982 from Cardiff University, with her thesis on 'Roman Glass in Spain'. Price worked in the British Museum from 1972 to 1973 before returning to Cardiff to teach prehistory. In 1977 she became the Keeper of the Salisbury Museum. In 1980 she became Lecturer in Archaeology at the University of Leeds. In 1990 she moved to Durham University where she taught provincial Roman archaeology, eventually earning a personal chair in the department of archaeology as well as serving as the head of the department for three years. Price was a longstanding member of the Yorkshire Archaeological Society and served on its council and house & finance committee. She served as the Chair of Roman Archaeology Section of the society from 1991 to 2008, succeeding Herman Ramm in the post.

In 1988, along with her partner Sue Hardman, and the other researcher Stephen Briggs and Peter Wilson, Price published a Festschrift for Mary Kitson Clark, a leading female authority on Roman Yorkshire titled Recent Research in Roman Yorkshire: studies in honour of Mary Kitson Clark (Mrs Derwas Chitty). Price worked with Sally Cottam to write Roman-British Glass Vessels: A Handbook which was published by the Council for British Archaeology in 1998 which was descibred by Hella Eckardt in 2019 as one of Price's "most notable publications".

Price conclusively identified a Roman glass shard excavated at Chedworth Roman villa in 2017, by matching the fragment to a restored fish-shaped bottle held by the Corning Museum of Glass in New York. This showed that the bottle was made in the Black Sea area, and is the only vessel of its kind ever found in Britain, making it startlingly rare. Her discovery gives further insight into the wealth and status of the inhabitants of Chedworth.

=== Awards and honours ===
She was elected as a Fellow of the Society of Antiquaries of London on 2 March 1978.

In 2006, to mark her retirement, a two-day conference was held in her honour by the Association for the History of Glass. A 2015 collection of papers from the conference, titled Glass of the Roman World was also dedicated to Price.

== Select publications ==
- Price, J, Wilson, P, Hardman, S., and Briggs, S. (eds) 1988. Recent Research in Roman Yorkshire: studies in honour of Mary Kitson Clark (Mrs Derwas Chitty)
- Price, J. 1998. "The social context of glass production in Roman Britain". In McCray, P. The Prehistory and History of Glassmaking Technology. 331–348.
- Price, J. 2000. "Late Roman glass vessels in Britain, from AD350 to 410 and beyond". In Price, J. Glass in Britain and Ireland, AD350-1100. London: The British Museum. 127: 1-31.
- Price, A., Cool, H. and Cottam, S. 2002. "The glass". In Wilson, P. R. Cataractonium: Roman Catterick and its hinterland. Excavations and research 1958-1997. York: English Heritage. CBA Research Report 128: 207–259.
- Price, J. 2003. "Broken bottles and quartz-sand: glass production in Yorkshire and the North in the Roman period". In Wilson, P. R. and Price, J. Aspects of industry in Roman Yorkshire and the North. Oxford: Oxbow. 81–93.
- Price, J. 2004. "Romano-British and early post-Roman glass vessels". Trethurgy excavations at Trethurgy Round, St Austell community and status in Roman and post-Roman Cornwall. H Quinnell Cornwall: Cornwall County Council. 85–92.
- MacMahon, A. and Price, J. 2005. "Glass-working and Glassworkers in Cities and Towns". In MacMahon, A. and Price, J., Roman Working Lives and Urban Living. Oxford: Oxbow Books. 167–190.
- Price, J. 2012. "Urban and maritime glass assemblages in the western and eastern Mediterranean" (review article). Antiquity 84. 254–257.
- Price, J. 2014. "Personal possessions or traded goods? Finds of decorated mould-blown glass vessels on Flavian sites in northern Britain" in Collins, R. and McIntosh, F. (eds) Life in the Limes: Studies of the Peoples and Objects of the Roman Frontiers Oxford, Oxbow. 140–151.
