= Pexton Moor =

Archaeological site in North Yorkshire, England

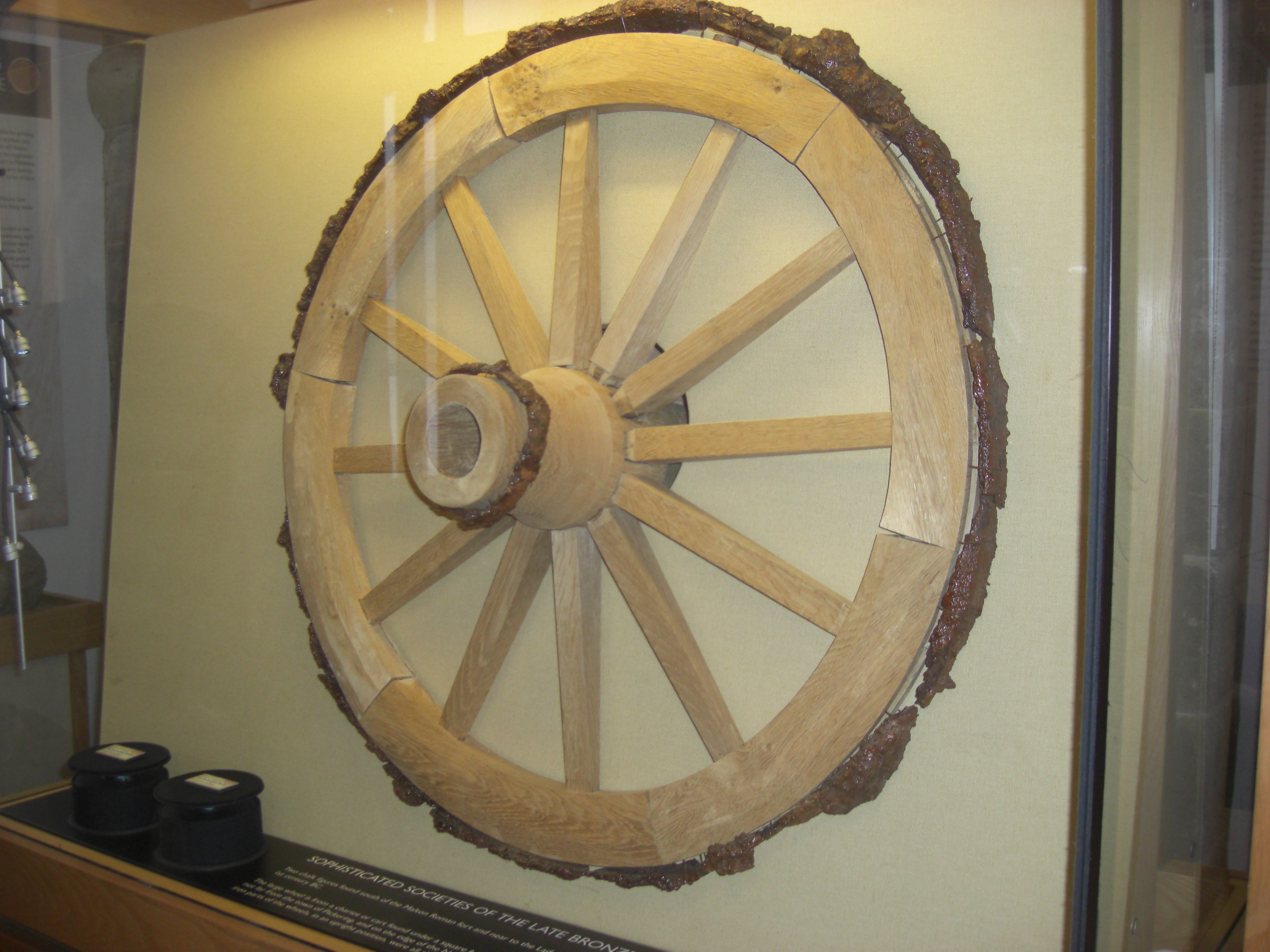
- A chariot wheel from Pexton Moor on display in the Yorkshire Museum.

- Map showing the location of Pexton Moor in North Yorkshire
- 54.256356°N 0.69981515°W
- Type: Iron Age Cemetery
- Cultures: Arras Culture
- Location: near Thornton-le-Dale, North Yorkshire
- Region: Yorkshire

Pexton Moor is an archaeological site in North Yorkshire containing a prehistoric cemetery. It is located at the western edge of Dalby Forest, north of Thornton-le-Dale. It forms part of the Arras Culture of inhumation and chariot burial prevalent in the region during the British Iron Age.

== The site ==
The site comprises a single chariot burial excavated in 1911 by John Kirk and Oxley Grabham. Kirk recorded that a gamekeeper on the site had discovered fragments of iron whilst rabbiting at the site. He subsequently recorded a barrow approximately 20 feet (6.1 m) in width and 4–5 feet (1.2–1.5 m) in height containing a mass of corroded iron which was subsequently identified as a chariot wheel. Kirk returned in 1935 to undertake a more complete excavation with A.E. Wellsford; she retained notes on the excavations which were eventually published by Ian Stead in 1959. Stead's report showed that the chariot burial was in a square-barrow, two iron wheels were excavated in their upright positions, and an iron bridle bit was also discovered. The wheels and bridle from this excavation were originally displayed in the York Castle Museum. They are now in the collection of the Yorkshire Museum.

A well-preserved round cairn at the site dating to the Late Neolithic to the Late Bronze Age periods, not investigated by Kirk and Grabham, was scheduled in 1972. A pair of prehistoric linear boundaries, each several hundred metres in length, surround the site on its north and eastern edges.

== See also ==
- Arras Culture
