= Oxley Grabham =

British naturalist, ornithologist and museum curator

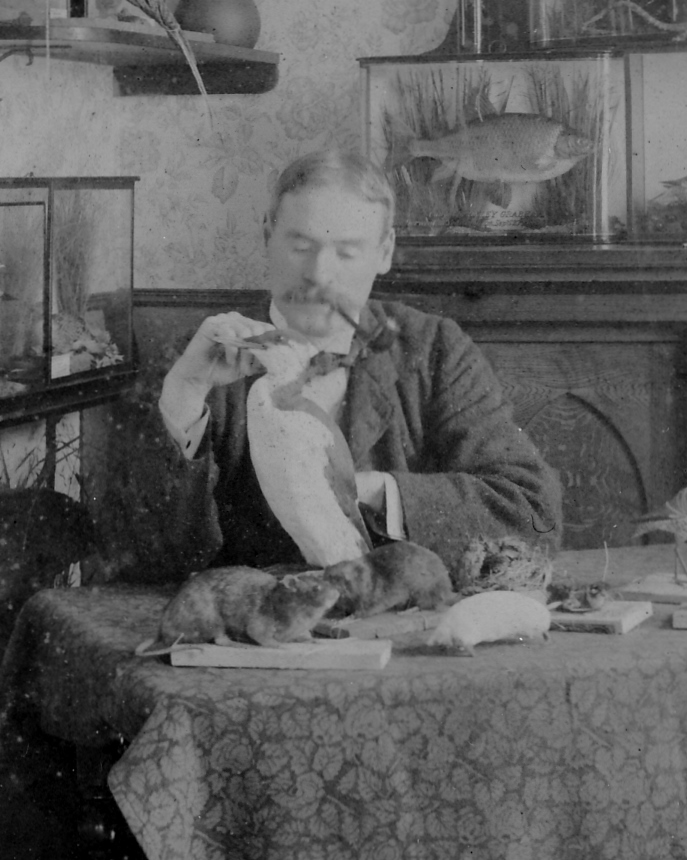
- Oxley Grabham with specimens
- Born: 1864
- Died: 6 December 1939 (aged 74–75)
- Occupations: Ornithologist; Museum curator

Academic work
- Institutions: Yorkshire Museum

Oxley Grabham (1864-1939) MA was a British naturalist, ornithologist, and museum curator.

== Career ==
Grabham was a Master's graduate of Cambridge University and Keeper of the Yorkshire Museum from 1904 to 1919. He was appointed by the Yorkshire Philosophical Society to the position of Keeper in 1904 following the retirement of the previous incumbent, Henry Maurice Platnauer. He was a member of the British Ornithologists' Union and a committee member of the Yorkshire Naturalists' Union.

Grabham was occasionally involved in archaeological excavations. In February 1911 he worked with John Kirk on the excavation of a Bronze Age Tumulus near Pickering and of an Iron Age chariot burial at Pexton Moor. He was also involved in the excavation of Wade's Causeway.

Grabham published in several journals, like The Zoologist and British Birds.

He was described in his obituary in the Yorkshire Post as "a naturalist of some distinction, he formed a collection of Yorkshire mammals which became famous on account of the specimens which illustrated the variety of types, many of which are rare and some unique."

== Personal life ==
In 1914 Grabham was an executor of the will of Tempest Anderson.

Upon his retirement due to ill health he was granted £150 a year for five years, plus a gratuity of £100 for special treatment. He was succeeded as Keeper by Walter Collinge, and voted an honorary member of the Yorkshire Philosophical Society upon his retirement. After retirement he was a resident of Thornton Dale.

== Publications ==
- 1897. "Owls and their Longevity", The Naturalist. p129.
- 1899. "Yorkshire's Bats", The Naturalist. p69-75.
- 1907. (With Metcalfe, T.A., Smith, Sydney H., and Kirk, Charles) British Mammals. Sixty Photographs from Life. London, Gowans & Gray, Ltd.
- 1907. "Mammalia". In Page, W. (ed.) Victoria History of the Counties of England: Yorkshire, Vol.1. London: Archibald Constable. p351-356.
- 1908. "The colony of Little Terns at Spurn Point, Yorkshire", British Birds, p317–32.
- 1909. "The Dormouse at home". Country Life (16 October 1909). p521-522.
- 1916. Yorkshire Potteries, Pots, and Potters. York: Yorkshire Philosophical Society.
