= Raymond Hayes =

British archaeologist (1909–2000)

Raymond Harland Hayes (13 July 1909 - 16 May 2000) was a British archaeologist. He wrote and published extensively about archaeology, primarily in the North York Moors area.

Hayes was born in York. His father was a professional photographer who owned a studio in Monkgate. While Raymond was still an infant, his family moved to Beck Garth, in the village of Hutton-le-Hole on the North York Moors. His father's business continued to prosper here. The studio mostly produced illustrations for books on the history and topography of North Riding. Upon graduating from a local school, Hayes began to serve as an apprentice to his father. He soon developed an interest in archaeology. Hayes had attended numerous lectures on archaeology delivered by some famous scholars, Philip Corder being a standout name among them. This was the major reason behind the young Hayes' inclination toward archaeology. His interest was complemented by a gift for photography, two qualities that won him admirers and employers on local digs.

Hayes's knowledge of the north York moors made him a sought after archaeologist. He worked with several renowned archaeologists, including Geoffrey Dimbleby. It was Hayes who took Dimbleby to sites on which the latter conducted his pioneering analysis of pollen.

The photography skills of Hayes led to his being part of many excavations from the mid-1930s. In 1947, he photographed the town-house site in Malton. In 1958, he took photographs of the excavation site at the Roman town of Cataractonium (Catterick). His photos of the town are the only surviving record of that excavation.

Hayes was rewarded with the MBE for his services to archaeology.
