= Violet Rodgers =

British museum curator

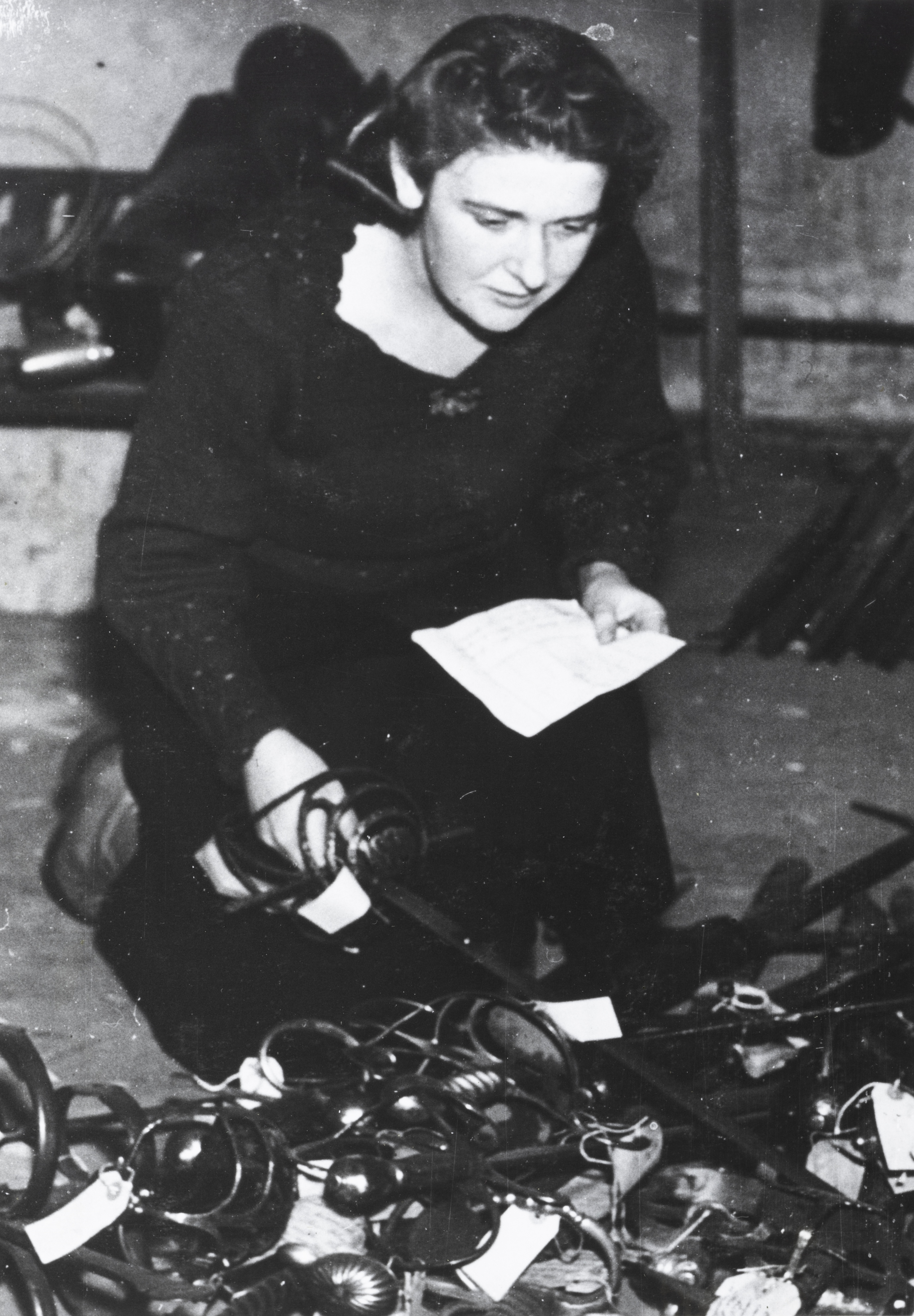
- Violet Rodgers, in the York Castle Museum
- Born: 7 February 1914; Bradford, England
- Died: 8 May 1978 (aged 64); York, England
- Occupation: Museum curator

Academic work
- Discipline: History
- Sub-discipline: Social history
- Institutions: York Castle Museum; Historical Museum of Kraków

Violet A Rodgers (7 February 1914 – 8 May 1978) was a British museum curator.

== Biography ==
Rodgers came to York in 1938 to work for John Lamplugh Kirk at the newly-opened York Castle Museum. She was interviewed by L. R. Allen Grove for a month long trial, and it was later decided that she would be kept on as a 'pupil assistant' at a rate of £1 a week. Kirk died in 1940 and Rodgers ran the museum as deputy curator during the Second World War. During this time she expanded the education offer and developed an interactive approach to the collections by allowing visitors to handle objects. In addition to her curatorial duties, Rodgers also served in the Royal Observer Corps throughout the war.

Rodgers was one of the first women to achieve the Museums Association Diploma.

In June 1947 she married Wladyslaw Włoch and left the museum for Poland. Immediately before her departure she made a plea in the Museums Journal for British museums to help replenish the lost collections of the Historical Museum of Kraków, damaged during the war, by donating duplicates. She became a Curator at the Historical Museum of Kraków and was awarded the Polish Cross of Merit for her work. During her time in Poland, Violet and her husband Wladyslaw also worked to improve the Pharmacy Museum in Krakow - Wladyslaw received the Ignacy Łukasiewicz medal from the Pharmaceutical Society of Poland for their dedication to the museum, which included a 'York apothecary shop'.

Rodgers tried to gain a visa from the Polish government to visit her family in England from 1949, but this was only granted in 1955 after intervention from Clement Attlee and Roy Mason. She returned for three months from August of that year.

Rodgers returned to York permanently in 1960 where she remained for the rest of her life. Wladyslaw worked for the biology department of the University of York.

Violet died at her home on Fulford Road, York on 8 May 1978. A funeral service was held at St Wilfrid's, York before she was buried on 12 May in the family grave at Undercliffe Cemetery. On 28 August the President of the Pharmaceutical Society of Poland delivered a paper about her work in the central hall of the Academy of Medicine in Krakow.

Rodgers and Kirk were both recreated by re-enactors on Kirkgate, the reconstructed Victorian street, as part of the Castle Museum's 80th anniversary in 2018.

== Select publications ==
- 1949. The collection of costumes: a chat on the costume collection in the Castle Museum. York, York Corporation.
- 1949. Valentines: a chat on the Valentine collection in the Castle Museum. York, York Corporation.
- 1979. The development of domestic lighting. York, York Castle Museum.
