= Mark Suggitt =

British museum curator and director (1956–2019)

Mark Nicholas Suggitt
- Mark Suggitt in 2018
- Born: April 1956
- Died: January 2019 (aged 62)
- Occupations: Museum curator Museum director

Academic work
- Discipline: History
- Sub-discipline: Social history
- Institutions: Salford Museums and Art Galleries; York Castle Museum; Bradford Museums and Galleries; St Albans Museums; Derwent Valley Mills World Heritage Site

Mark Nicholas Suggitt (April 1956 – 11 January 2019) was a British museum curator and director.

== Biography ==
Suggitt was a graduate from the school of Museum Studies at the University of Leicester. In 1979 he took up his first museum job as assistant keeper of social history at Salford Museum and Art Gallery. His subsequent museum appointments include working as the Curator of the York Castle Museum, the assistant director of and Yorkshire and Humberside Museums Council, Head of Bradford Museums and Galleries, and being Director of St Albans Museums. From October 2011 until his death he was Chair of the Impressions Gallery. He was also the director of Derwent Valley Mills World Heritage Site until 2017.

Suggitt was a Fellow of the Museums Association. He was a board member of the Museums Association, the International Council of Museums, World Heritage UK and has chaired the Museum Professionals Group and the Social History Curators Group. From June 2007 to January 2011 he was a director of the Undercliffe Cemetery charity.

== Select publications ==
- Suggitt, M. 1985. 'Heals to Habitat; museums and modern interiors', Museums Journal
- Suggitt, M. 1990. 'Emissaries from the toy cupboard', Museums Journal
- Suggitt, M. 1998. 'Museums for the Millennium', Journal for Holocaust Education, 7. doi:10.1080/17504902.1998.11087067
- Webb, P. and Suggitt, M. Gadgets and necessities: an encyclopedia of household innovations. Abc-Clio Inc.
