= Raindale Mill =

Reconstructed flour mill in York, England

Coordinates: 53.9548°N 1.0781°W

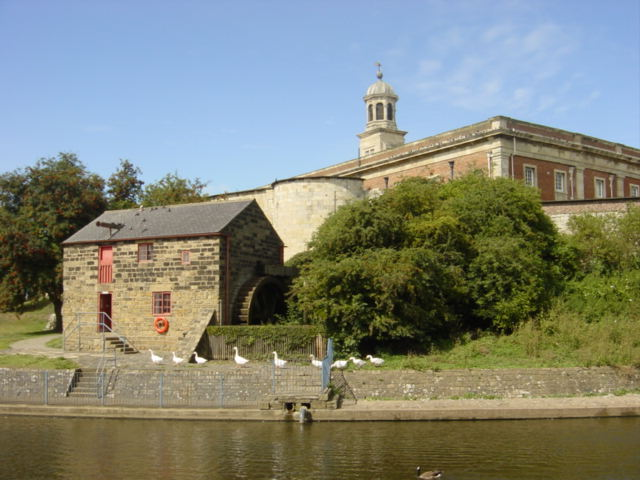
Water Mill, York Castle Museum

Raindale Mill is a reconstructed early 19th-century flour mill which was moved from Raindale Valley on the North York Moors to the grounds of York Castle Museum in the 1960s.

== History ==
The mill was powered by a mill pond. This was connected to a mill race where it would hit the waterwheel in overshot of the wheel. The wheel is then connected by gear wheels to millstones that grind grain into flour. In 1915 the water that flowed to the mill pond dried up and so made the mill redundant. It was donated to York Castle Museum in 1935. It was brought to its current site in the 1950s and 60s. The mill was opened to the public in 1966.

== Restoration ==
In 2010 the mill reopened with the aim to get it working again. In 2011 the mill has started its restoration to have it working again.
