= Cawthorne Camp =

Roman site in North Yorkshire, England

Cawthorn Camp
- North Yorkshire, England
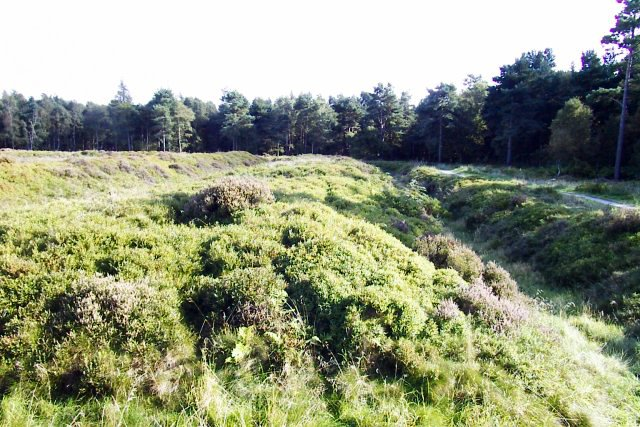
- Part of the earthworks

Location
- Location in North Yorkshire
- Coordinates: 54.300°N 0.798°W
- Grid reference: SE783900

Cawthorn Camp (sometimes spelled "Cawthorne") is a Roman site in northeast England, about 4 miles (6 km) north of Pickering, North Yorkshire.

== Description ==
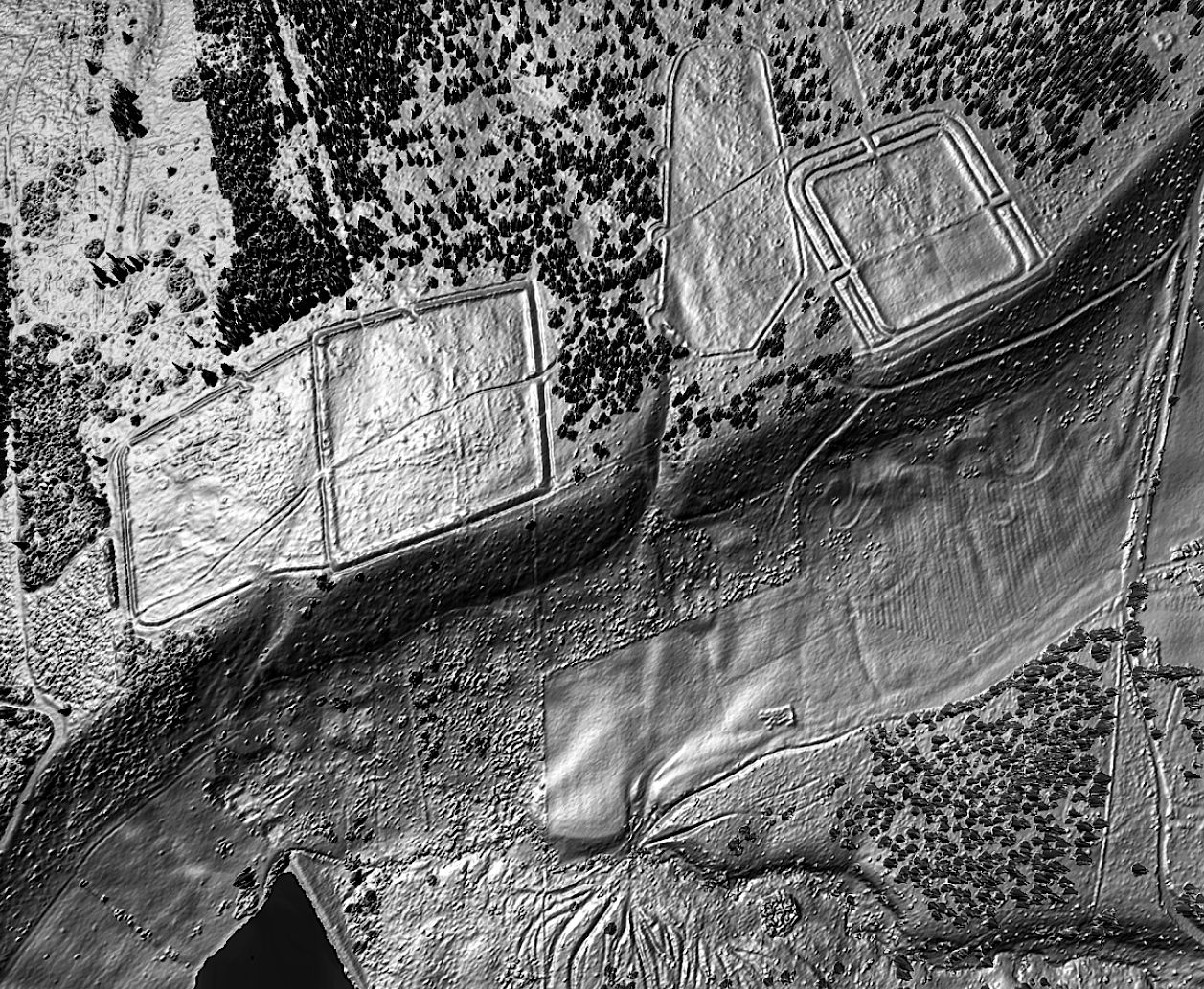
A lidar view of the camp and forts: the western fort (right), square and cutting into the polygonal camp (left of it), and the eastern simple fort (left) with an eastern annexe (further left)

The well-preserved earthworks outline of an early temporary camp built to an unusual polygonal plan, and two forts: the western one, typically square with rounded corners and well protected by a double bank and an external ditch, cuts into the earlier camp. It measures 175 m across overall, is orientated north-east by south-west, and probably dates back to the late first century AD. The simpler eastern fort stood 75 m further east, measures 150 by 150 m, is defended by a single rampart bank and an outer ditch with a counterscarp, which together are 14 m across. A later added annexe boders it on its eastern side, similar in shape and size, but with less robust defences. The earthworks date from the late 1st or early 2nd century AD. It has been originally suggested that the entire complex was built only for practice and non-permanently use, but recent interpretation favours the two forts beinh permanently garrisoned as part of the defensive networks in northern England.

== Archaeological investigations ==
Archaeological investigation has also found indications of pre-Roman activity at the site and traces of later sunken dwellings (Grubenhäuser). J. R. Mortimer discovered a late Iron Age chariot burial here in 1905, and at least one other square barrow is known from the site.

== Status ==
The site was acquired by the North York Moors National Park in 1983.
