= John Kirk (archaeologist) =

British medical doctor and archaeologist

Dr John Lamplugh Kirk FSA
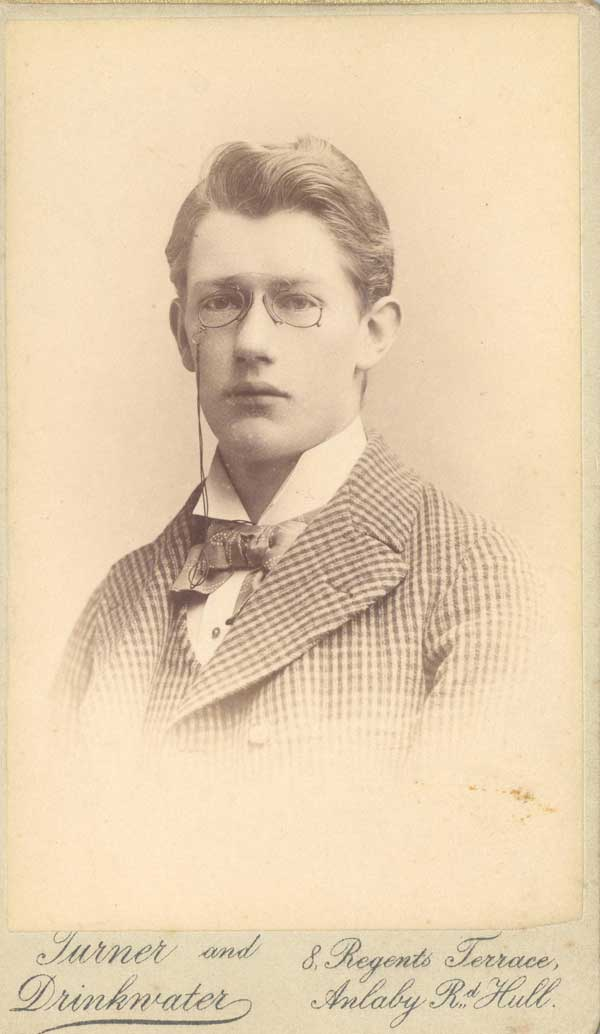
- Kirk in 1890
- Born: 1869; Hull, England
- Died: 1940 (aged 70–71)
- Occupations: Doctor; Archaeologist; Museum curator
- Known for: Founding the York Castle Museum

Academic work
- Discipline: Archaeology
- Sub-discipline: Roman archaeology

Dr John Lamplugh Kirk MRCS FSA (30 April 1869 – 26 February 1940) was a British medical doctor, amateur archaeologist and founder of York Castle Museum in York, North Yorkshire.

== Personal life ==
He was born in Hull in 1869 and practised as a doctor in London before moving to Pickering in 1898. Kirk resided in Houndgate Hall, Pickering from 1910 to 1938. Kirk spent some time painting natural and landscape scenes, such as his 1891 'Stags in the Snow'.

Kirk was intimately involved in Yorkshire Archaeological Society and was a member of the general committee, executive committee and acted as director and honorary treasurer.

== Professional life ==
=== Archaeologist ===
In February 1911 Kirk collaborated with Oxley Grabham (Keeper of the Yorkshire Museum) in the excavation of a Bronze Age Tumulus near Pickering and of an Iron Age chariot burial at Pexton Moor. Kirk excavated the fort of Virosidum at Bainbridge, North Yorkshire in 1925-26 with R. G. Collingwood. He excavated part of the Roman camp at Malton in 1927 with Philip Corder. The results of this excavation formed the core of the Roman archaeology collection of the Malton Museum. Kirk undertook excavations on the late Iron Age settlement at Costa Beck near Pickering between 1925 and 1929 - these excavations were published by Mary Kitson Clark in 1931. Kirk and Corder also excavated at the side of Langton Roman Villa, near Malton, the excavations of which were led by Kirk. Regarding Kirk's role in the Langton excavations, Corder wrote: "The daily supervision and all the organisation of the work once again fell to Dr. Kirk, who directed the excavation in person, until ill health led to his forced retirement. Even then he largely directed the final stages of the work from his bed".

Published works as an archaeologist include:

- Kirk, J. L. 1912. "The Opening of a Tumulus near Pickering", Annual Report of the Yorkshire Philosophical Society for 1911, 57-62.
- Corder, P. and Kirk, J.L. 1932. A Roman Villa at Langton, near Malton, East Yorkshire (Roman Malton and District Reports no.4) Leeds: Yorkshire Archaeological Society
- Corder, P. and Kirk. J. 1928. "Roman Malton: a Yorkshire Fortress and its neighbourhood" in Antiquity Vol. 2. pp. 69–72

=== Curator ===
Kirk had amassed a collection of objects relating to the study of Social History. His enthusiasm for folk museums was encouraged through visiting the Stockholm Historical Museum, Biological Museum, and Skansen (an open-air museum) in Sweden in 1910. In addition to collecting and photographing social history, he would accept 'bygones' in lieu of payment from his medical patients.

Initial plans to house the collection at Pickering Memorial Hall in the 1920s ultimately failed. In 1931 Kirk advertised more widely for expressions of interest from sites who wished to house his collection, receiving responses from sites in Middlesbrough, Wakefield, Batley, Doncaster and York, with the latter eventually being successful. The Female Prison (now part of York Castle Museum) was bought by the City of York Corporation in 1934 and modified to house the Kirk Collection of "bygones", opening as the Castle Museum in 1938. A major attraction of this new museum was the recreation of a late Victorian street, named 'Kirkgate'; this was the first of its kind in Britain.

Kirk and his deputy curator, Violet Rodgers were both recreated by re-enactors on Kirkgate, the reconstructed Victorian street, as part of the Castle Museum's 80th anniversary in 2018.

=== Awards and fellowships ===
Kirk was a Member of the Royal College of Surgeons and a Fellow of the Society of Antiquaries of London. In 1938 he was elected an honorary member of the Yorkshire Philosophical Society.
