= Peter Wilson (writer) =

Australian author, academic and management thinker

- Born: 11 July 1951 (age 75); Melbourne, Australia
- Spouse(s): Susan Gai Wilson (11 May 1974 – 25 December 2005); Melinda Ann Hess McIntosh (29 December 2007 – 15 June 2012)
- Children: Emily, paediatrician, born 1983 and Alex, architect, born 1986

Peter Wilson is an Australian author, academic and management thinker. Wilson was made a member of the Order of Australia in 2005 for services to workplace relations and safety, and community service. Formerly, Wilson held group executive roles at ANZ Bank, Amcor Limited, and as CEO of Energy 21. He is a regular commentator in the Australian media on workplace issues, notably gender equality.

== Early career ==
He was Executive General Manager, Human Resources & Operating Risk at Amcor Limited, Managing Director at ANZ Bank, and served as CEO of Energy 21, which was sold to Origin Energy in 1999 during Wilson's tenure.

== Later appointments ==
Wilson currently serves as Chairman of Australian Human Resources Institute Limited, Yarra Valley Water Ltd. and Vision Super. He is on the board of directors of Vincent Fairfax Family Foundation on Ethical Leadership and the World Federation of People Management Associations, as well as serving as adjunct professor in Management at Monash University.

Wilson recently completed a research fellowship role under the Australian Prime Minister’s ‘Australia China Climate Change Partnership’. As Chairman of the Australian Human Resources Institute, Wilson has also led numerous research projects. In 2010-2011, Wilson also led the Business Council of Australia’s mentoring program for senior executive women known as 'the C-Suite' Project.

== Publications ==
Wilson is the author of Make Mentoring Work. The book features interviews with 90 leaders in different sectors such as sports and business, and offers guidance on both how to mentor someone successfully and how junior employees can get the most out of mentoring, including avoiding choosing a direct supervisor as a mentor, ensuring mentors and mentees share the same values, and the importance of being prepared and setting specific goals for mentees. The book also clarifies the distinction between sponsorship and mentoring, and argues mentoring is increasingly important in a complex, globalized and technology saturated business environment. Wilson told The Sydney Morning Herald he wrote the book to "give back," saying "You get to the stage where you want to give back outside the circle of parents and children; to help those struggling to go forward in life."

== Awards and honours ==
Wilson was made a member of the Order of Australia in 2005. The order was founded in 1975 to recognize Australian citizens and other persons for achievement or for meritorious service. Wilson received the citation for services to workplace relations and safety, and community service.

== Author and Management Thinker ==
Wilson writes regularly on human resources and management issues in Australia, often focusing on diversity and gender issues, executive pay and business ethics. As Chairman of the Australian Human Resources Institute, Wilson has also led research projects on issues including employee retention, mature workforce participation, and coaching and mentoring. He regularly comments in the media on issues related to gender equality and other HR issues. Wilson gave the Twenty Second Kingsley Laffer Memorial Lecture at the University of Sydney on the topic of 'Australia in a Globally Competitive Workplace – Challenges and Opportunities' on 26 November 2014.

=== Gender Equality ===
Wilson advocates policies that allow women to balance personal commitments while pursuing their careers, including flexible working arrangements, mentoring, support for those returning from maternity leave, affordable access to childcare and remuneration benchmarking. He is also critical of gender pay discrimination. He is a supporter of efforts to help more women reach executive and board level positions. "The economic case for women, who hold 10.7 per cent of senior executive roles in ASX 200 companies, to assume more prominent senior roles and responsibilities in the Australian workforce is building rapidly," he wrote in The Sydney Morning Herald, though he also warned of the short-term risk that a push to see more women promoted may result in under-qualified women being placed into positions they are not yet prepared to handle.

In addition, Wilson has cited less tangible barriers to female career advancement such as "incumbent male inertia". He has also highlighted the pressure to conform to corporate culture placed on those women who do make it onto boards due to fierce competition for the scarce positions now available. This can discourage those that do fill these top positions from advocating for the advancement of other women. He has also spoken out urging employers to do more to combat domestic violence and has called workplace sexual harassment a "corporate cancer," arguing that higher female participation rates in senior business executive roles and board postings would help to cure the problem. He has been particularly critical of Australia's performance in these areas, stating the country has "world’s worst practice amongst modern, mature and developed countries."

=== The 'C-Suite' Project ===
The 'C-Suite' Project is a scheme created by the Business Council of Australia in partnership with the Australian Human Resources Institute (AHRI). Participating CEOs, who are also BCA members, pledge to personally mentor high-achieving women employed by other BCA member companies. The goal is to identify talented women and open up pathways for them to rise to the top of the corporate ladder. Many Australian business leaders participated as mentors, including CEO and managing director of the Woolworths conglomerate, Michael Luscombe, the chief executive and general manager of McDonald's Australia, Catriona Noble, the chief executive and managing director of the Commonwealth Bank, Ralph Norris, and the chief executive of Deloitte, Giam Swiegers.

=== Executive pay ===
Wilson has been critical of poorly designed bonus schemes for executives, noting that "problems occur, and shareholders usually become agitated, when poorly constructed key performance indicators are used, and results for the executive team look more like a good night out at the casino than robust indicators which consistently measure links between applied effort and earned results." Large bonuses not clearly linked to exceptional performance are particularly problematic, he has written, in light of the recent worldwide financial crisis "in which indefensible excesses have occurred at the same time as shareholders have suffered and employees in their thousands have lost their jobs."

=== Corporate ethics ===
Wilson is an advocate of new methods for companies to articulate and act in accordance with their company values. Writing for the Australian Financial Review in March 2010, Wilson advocated a switch from mission and values (MVV) statements and triple bottom line (TBL) statements to a new dual approach. He suggested companies split values into business value objectives, focused on financial goals, and core internal values. Wilson cites Apple Inc. under former CEO Steve Jobs as a company executing this new approach well. There are several benefits to this two-fold approach, notably "improving sustainability in shareholder value growth through adopting clearer ethical values and leadership approaches." Wilson also cautions that Australia is lagging in making these changes, raising the risk of costly future ethics scandals.
