= York Castle Museum =

- Location within North Yorkshire
- Established: 1938; 88 years ago
- Location: York, England
- Coordinates: 53.95559°N 1.07827°W
- Type: Social history museum
- Visitors: 221,170 (2026)
- Directors: Kathryn Blacker, York Museums Trust
- Website: www.yorkcastlemuseum.org.uk

The York Castle Museum is a museum located in York, North Yorkshire, England, on the site of York Castle, which was originally built by William the Conqueror in 1068. The museum itself was founded by John L. Kirk in 1938, and is housed in prison buildings which were built on the site of the castle in the 18th century, the debtors' prison (built in 1701–05 using stone from the ruins of the castle) and the female prison (built 1780–85).

== Museum and history ==
=== Foundation ===
In 1931 John Lamplugh Kirk, a physician and amateur archaeologist based in Pickering, North Yorkshire, advertised for expressions of interest from sites who wished to house his large collection of objects relating to the study of Social History. Although he received responses from sites in Middlesbrough, Wakefield, Batley, Doncaster and York, it was the latter which was ultimately successful. The Female Prison was bought by the City of York Corporation in 1934 and modified to house the Kirk Collection of "bygones", opening as the Castle Museum on 23 April 1938. A major attraction of this new museum was the recreation of a late Victorian street, named 'Kirkgate'; this was the first of its kind in Britain.

=== Second World War ===
Violet Rodgers started as the Deputy Curator in 1938. Kirk died in 1940 and Rodgers ran the museum, which remained open, during the Second World War. During this time she expanded the education offer and developed an interactive approach to the collections by allowing visitors to handle objects. She left the museum in 1947 when she emigrated to Poland.

=== Post-war and 20th century ===
The debtor's prison was added to the castle display spaces in 1952. The Edwardian 'Half Moon Court' (an annexe to the eastern edge of the debtor's prison) was added in 1963. The Raindale Mill was opened at the back of the site in 1966.

=== 21st century ===
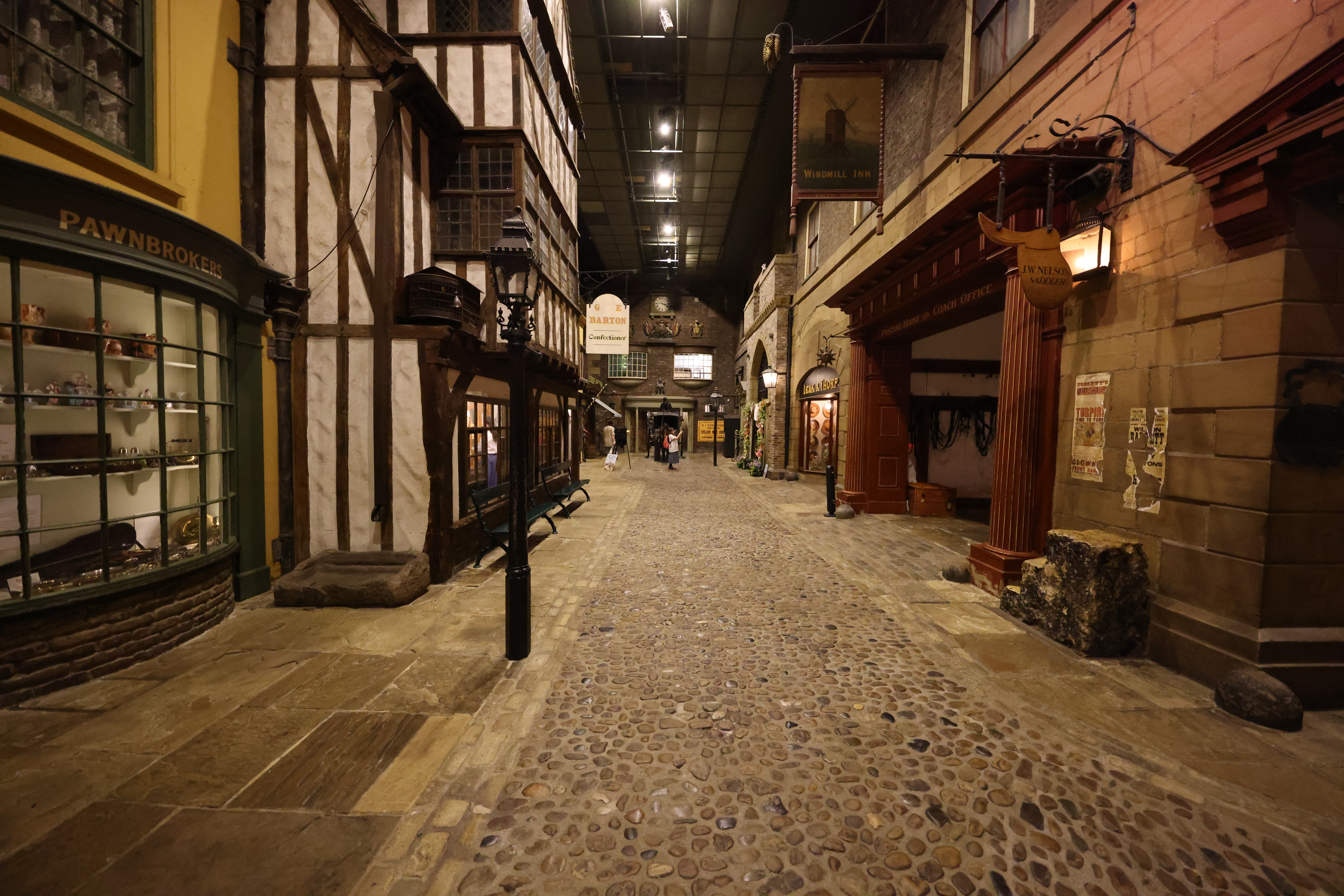
Kirkgate street in 2025

In 2012, the Kirkgate street was redeveloped to reflect a broader view of Victorian society, including back alleys and a slum dwelling.

A new £18 million redevelopment of the site was announced in 2017 as part of the 'Castle Gateway Project'. A redevelopment team was announced in February 2019.

During the COVID-19 pandemic the museum, along with the other York Museums Trust sites, closed to the public on 23 March 2020. It was announced in July that the museum would reopen on 1 August (Yorkshire Day) 2020. The museum was forced to close a second time from 5 November 2020 as part of new national restrictions in England. It reopened on 2 December 2020 with a temporary 'Christmas on Kirkgate' experience featuring decorations, nutcracker dolls, snow, and music. York was moved into Tier 3 Restrictions on 31 December 2020, forcing the museum to again close. It reopened, on 19 May 2021.

In January 2023 a wall on the outside of the Female Prison was daubed with "offensive graffiti". A 17-year old boy was subsequently arrested on suspicion of racially aggravated criminal damage and being in possession of articles to commit criminal damage.

On 27 September 2023 the Female Prison part of the museum was closed to the public as a precaution, following the discovery of RAAC in its roof. A report presented to the City of York Council on 9 April highlighted that this partial closure of the museum resulted in a loss of revenue of £400,000. CEO Kathryn Blacker called on the support of local MPs and the UK Government for emergency financial help because the Castle Museum was one of only three museums in the UK to have RAAC and the only listed building.

== Buildings ==
York Castle Museum consists of several individual structures located to the immediate south of Clifford's Tower, within the former castle bailey. It is surrounded by part of the York Castle wall on its southern side, and beyond that the River Foss. In 1969 a gallery was built to link the museum in the Female Prison with the Debtors' Prison.

=== Debtor's Prison ===
The Debtor's Prison was originally built as the County Gaol in 1701–1705. It is a three-storey building with a central range and clock turret flanked by projecting wings built with Tadcaster limestone and brick walls, and a lead and slate roof. The prison's most notable inhabitant was Dick Turpin, who was incarcerated in the 1730s before his trial at the York assizes. His cell forms part of the exhibition in the current museum.

=== Female Prison ===
The Female Prison and yard were built in 1780–83 at a cost of £1,540 and to a design by Thomas Wilkinson and John Prince. The frontage of this building matches that of the Court building on the opposite side of the bailey. The prison was altered and wings added in 1802 with a podium and steps added in 1820–50. The front of the building is constructed from sandstone ashlar with the inside of the portico rendered. The prison was bought by the City of York Corporation in 1934 opening as the Castle Museum in 1938.

=== Raindale Mill ===
Raindale Mill is a reconstructed early-19th-century flour mill which was moved from the North York Moors to the grounds of York Castle Museum in the 1960s. It was opened to the public in 1966.

The two prison buildings, as seen from Clifford's Tower

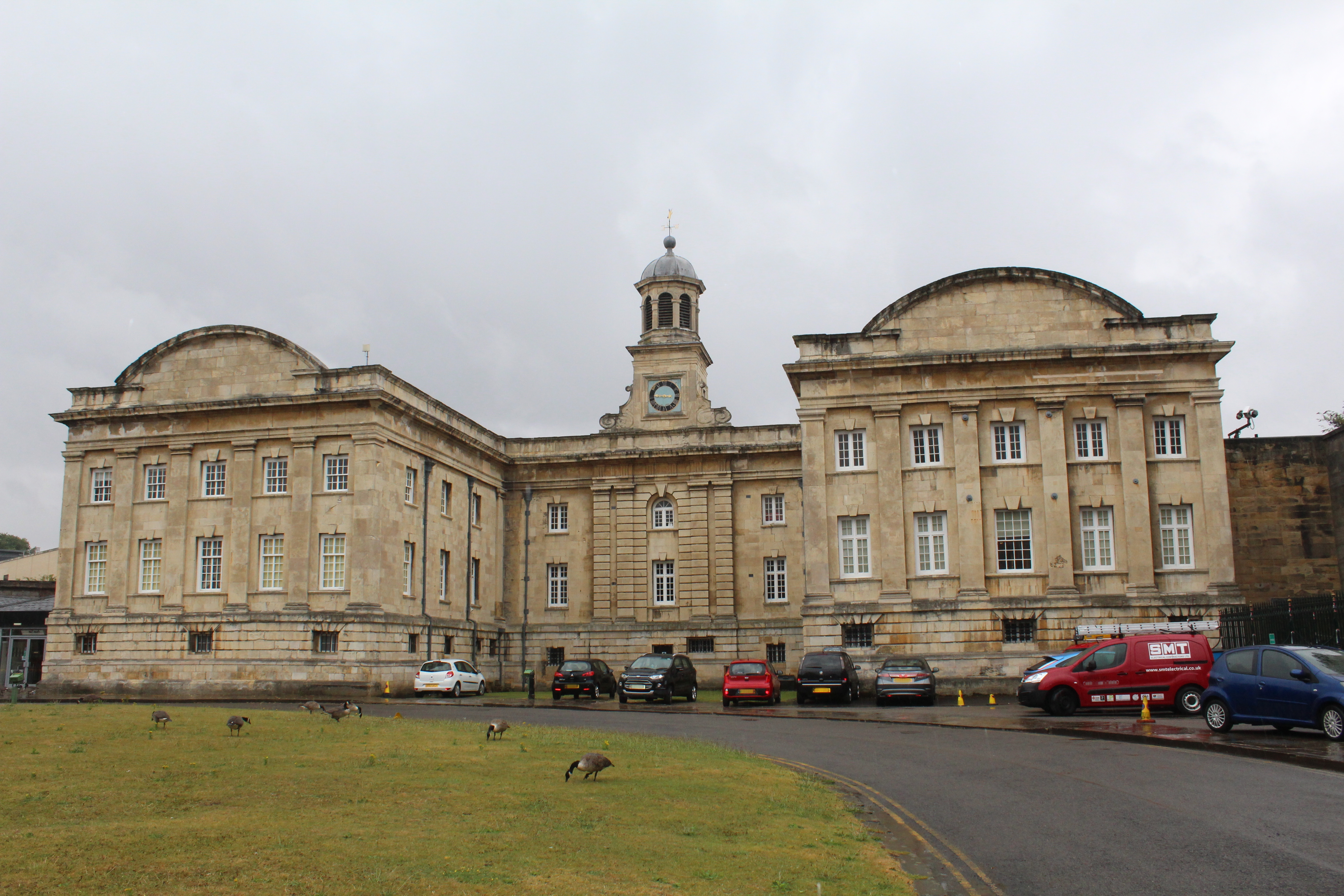
The Debtor's Prison building

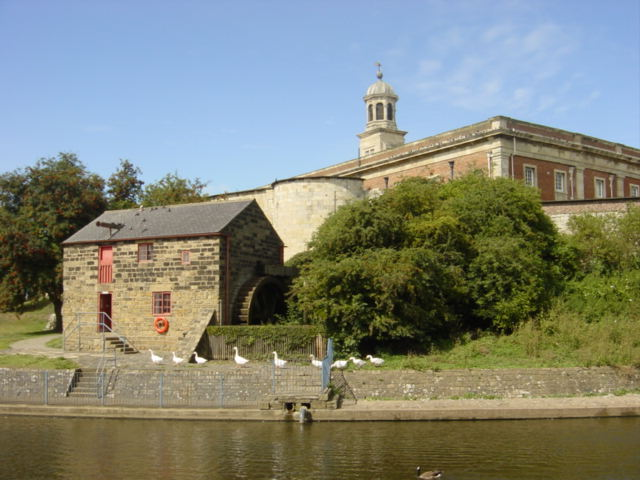
Raindale Mill

== Curators ==
Curators of the York Castle Museum
Name	Title	Dates in Post	Image
John Kirk	Curator and founder	1934–1940	
L. R. A. Grove	Curator	1936–1939	
Violet Rodgers	Deputy Curator	1938–1947	
John H. Scholes	Curator	1949–?	
Robert Patterson	Curator	1950s	
Florence Wright	Education Officer	1950–?	
Cyril Maynard Mitchell	Curator?	1950s	
Peter Brears		1975–1978	
Graham Nicholson	Curator	c.1981	
Mark Suggitt	Curator	1980s	
Clare Rose	Keeper of Textiles	1983–1988	
Josie Sheppard	Curator of Costume and textiles	1988–c.2010	
Alison Bodley	Curator of History	2013–2016	

== Galleries ==
=== Current exhibitions ===
- Kirkgate – a recreated Victorian Street, named after the museum's founder, was redeveloped and expanded in 2012.
- Toy Stories – a history of children's toys.
- The Sixties.
- Recreated period rooms including a Victorian parlour and a 17th-century dining room.
- The Cells – a display about life in the prison – was opened in 2009 in the cells of the old Debtors Prison. The former Condemned Cell, possibly once occupied by Dick Turpin, can also be visited.
- 1914: When the World Changed Forever – opened in 2014 to commemorate the centenary of the First World War.
- Shaping the Body: Food, Fashion & Life – an exhibition about changes in fashion, opened on 26 March 2016.

=== Past exhibitions ===
- 1993–1994: 'Stop the Rot'. A special exhibition about museum conservation.
- pre-2004 to 2004: 'Spotless'. An exhibition about cleaning.
- April 2000 to April 2016: 'From Cradle to Grave'. An exhibition about birth, marriage, and death.
- 1 April 2017 to 1 April 2018: 'Chocolate: York's Sweet Past'.
- 13 July 2018 to 28 April 2019: 'A Personal Collections of Vivien Westwood's Shoes'.
- 22 March 2019 to 22 March 2020: 'The Museum of Broken Relationships', an exhibition about the stories and objects relating to broken relationships.

== Awards ==
- Visit York Awards 2015 – Visitor Experience of the Year (Finalist).
- Little Vikings Awards 2017 – Best Attraction (Winner).
- Little Vikings Awards 2019 – Best Attraction (Highly Commended).
- Trip Advisor Certificate of Excellence.

== See also ==
- Yorkshire Museum
- Raindale Mill
- York Art Gallery
- Treasurer's House
- Fairfax House
