= Philip Corder =

British archaeologist and curator

Philip Corder (c. 1891–29 May 1961) was a British archaeologist and curator, and president (1954-1957) of the Royal Archaeological Institute.

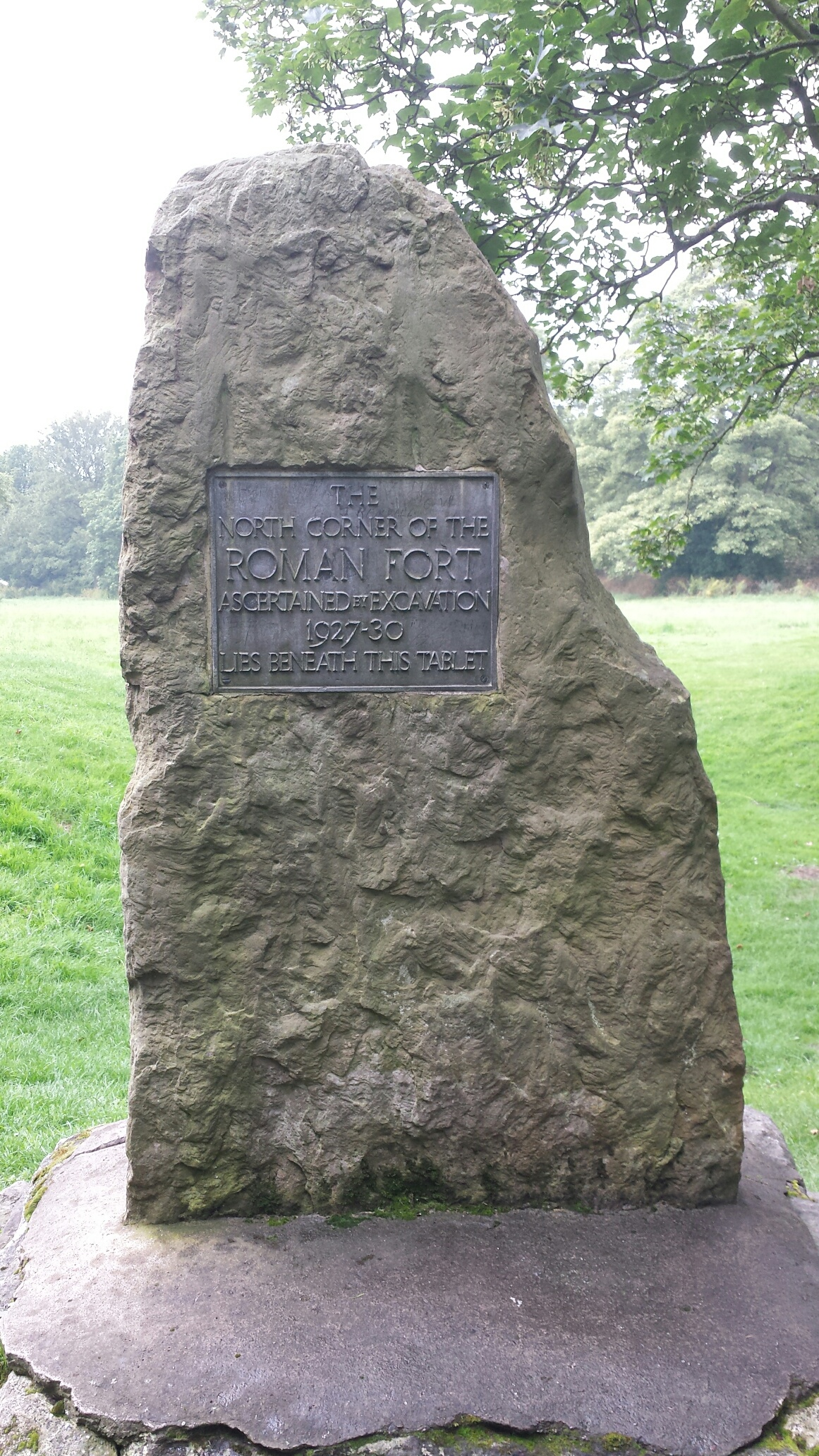
Plaque recording the excavations of the Roman fort at Malton in 1927-1930 by Philip Corder

== Biography ==
Corder was Master of Bootham School, where he taught English, before becoming the curator of Verulamium Museum. Corder was elected as an Honorary member of the Yorkshire Philosophical Society in 1940. He served as the Assistant Secretary to the Society of Antiquaries of London from 1943-1961, with which he was a Fellow.

Corder appeared in four episodes of the 1950s panel show Animal, Vegetable, Mineral between 1955 and 1957.

=== Excavations ===
Corder undertook the first excavations at the Roman fort at Malton (Derventio) in 1927–1930, along with his colleague Dr John Kirk. The material from this excavation formed the core collection of the Malton Museum in Malton, North Yorkshire. Corder and Kirk also undertook a series of excavation at the Roman Villa at Langton.

In 1928 Corder published the results of his major excavations of a kiln site at Crambeck in North Yorkshire. The Crambeck excavations, undertaken in autumn 1926 and summer and autumn of 1927 with students of Bootham School, identified three types of pottery uniquely produced at the site, now known as Crambeck Ware.

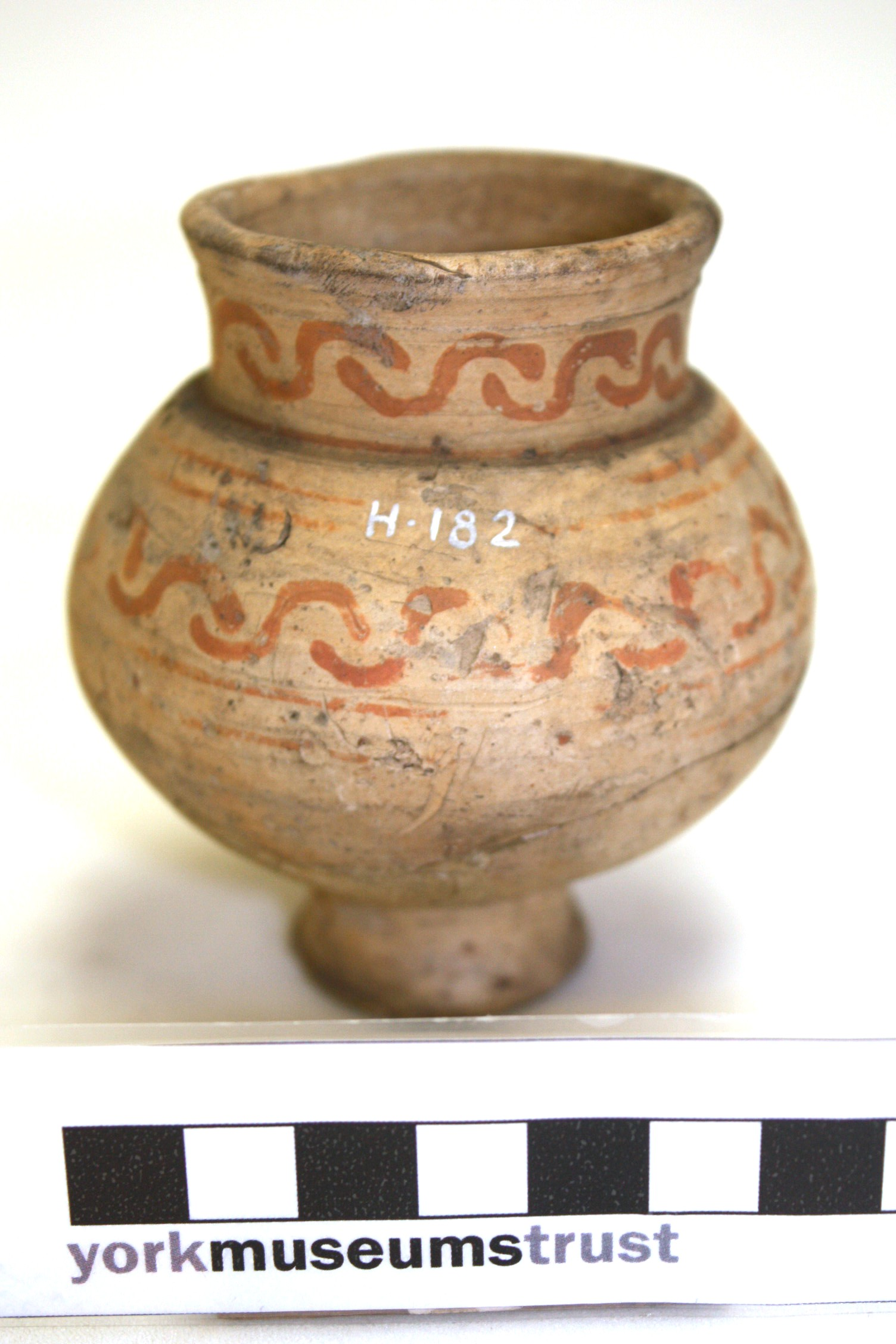
Pedestal beaker jar in Crambeck Parchment Ware. In the Yorkshire Museum

== Publications ==
- Corder, P. 1928. The Roman Pottery at Crambeck, Castle Howard. Roman Malton and District Report 1
- Corder, P. 1930. The Defences of the Roman Fort at Malton. Roman Malton and District Report 2
- Corder, P. and Kirk, J. L. 1932. A Roman villa at Langton, E. Yorkshire. Roman Malton and District Report 4
- Corder, P. 1941. Verulamium, 1930-40. Verulamium Museum Publications No. 2
