= Pete Wilson (historian) =

Peter Richard Wilson (born 26 June 1957) is a widely published British historian and former Head of Research Policy (Roman Archaeology) at English Heritage. He has been published extensively as an authority of Roman Britain for over 30 years.

His primary published works include The Archaeology of Roman Towns, Aspects of Industry in Roman Yorkshire and the North and Cataractonium: Roman Catterick and its Hinterland.

He is also a committee member of the Society for the promotion of Roman Studies.
