= Hewison =

Hewison is a surname. Notable people with the surname include:

- Bob Hewison (1889–1964), English footballer
- Christopher Hewison (born 1979), English cricketer
- George Hewison (born 1944), folk singer, trade unionist, member of the Communist Party of Canada
- Kevin Hewison, political scientist
- Robert Hewison (born 1943), British cultural historian

== See also ==
- Hewison v Meridian Shipping Services Pte Ltd, English tort law case, concerning an employer's liability for an employee's illegal acts
- Hewison Point forms the east side of Ferguson Bay and the southeast end of Thule Island, in the South Sandwich Islands
- Steve Huison (born 1963), British actor, mostly on TV and occasional films
- Hewitson
- Hewitsonia
- Hewson
