= Hewson =

Hewson is a surname. Notable people with the surname include:

- Ali Hewson (born 1961), Irish activist and wife of U2's Bono
- Allan Hewson (born 1954), former New Zealand Rugby union All Black
- Arthur Hewson (1914–1999), Australian politician
- Ashleigh Hewson (born 1979), Australian Rugby union Wallaroo
- Brian Hewson (1933–2022), retired British middle-distance athlete
- David Hewson (born 1953), British novelist
- Dave Hewson (composer) (born 1953), British television and film composer
- David Hewson (Canadian football) (born 1982), Canadian football player
- Dominic Hewson (born 1974), English cricketer
- Emily Hewson (born 1982), Australian tennis player
- Eve Hewson (born 1991), Irish actress and Bono and Ali Hewson's daughter
- Gilbert Hewson (died 1951), Irish politician
- Helen Joan Hewson (1938–2007), Australian botanist and botanical illustrator
- Henry Hewson, rugby league footballer of the 1920s
- John Hewson (died 1662), a soldier in the New Model Army and signatory on the death warrant of King Charles I
- John Hewson (1744–1821), an American textile printer born in England
- John Hewson (born 1946), Australian economist and former politician
- Jones Hewson (1874–1902), Welsh singer and actor
- Liv Hewson (born 1995), Australian actor
- Marillyn Hewson (born 1954), American businesswoman, former chairman, President, and CEO of Lockheed Martin
- Bono (born Paul Hewson in 1960), Irish singer of U2
- Peter Hewson, British singer, vocalist with Chicory Tip
- Richard Anthony Hewson (born 1943), English musician
- Sam Hewson (born 1988), English footballer
- Sherrie Hewson (born 1950), English actress
- Tony Hewson (1934–2020), former British racing cyclist
- William Hewson (1806–1870), English theological writer
- William Hewson (surgeon) (1739–1774), English surgeon

== See also ==
- Hewson River New Zealand
- Hewson-Gutting House, a registered historic building in Cincinnati, Ohio
- Hewson Consultants, 1980s video game developer and publisher
