= Doi Kham =

Thai Crown corporation

Doi Kham Food Products Co., Ltd
- Industry: Food processing and packaged foods
- Founded: 1994 in Bangkok, Thailand
- Headquarters: Bangkok, Thailand
- Key people: Pipong Pongsathorn, Sena Ayutthaya (CEO)
- Revenue: 1.2 billion baht (2023)
- Owner: Crown Property Bureau
- Website: www.doikham.co.th

The Doi Kham Company (Thai : ดอยคำ ) was founded in 1994 by the Crown Property Bureau at the request of King Bhumibol Adulyadej to set up a business to buy products from royal projects and farmers at fair prices and sell quality products to the Thai population.

== Origin ==
The Doi Kham Royal Project was begun when King Bhumibol Adulyadej visited Chiang Mai during the cool season in 1964. He had the opportunity to observe the problems of rural villagers. In the hilly northern region, farming was of the slash and burn variety and was causing the forests to be reduced to ashes. Also, the number of people growing opium poppies was increasing. At the king's command, the royal project was created to provide alternative sources of income for hill tribe villages that formerly relied on opium production and swidden agriculture.

== Name ==
The meaning of the words "Doi Kham" comes from two northern Thai words. The word "doi" means 'mountain' or 'hill' while the word "kham" is a shortened word for "thongkham" which means 'gold'.

== Operations ==
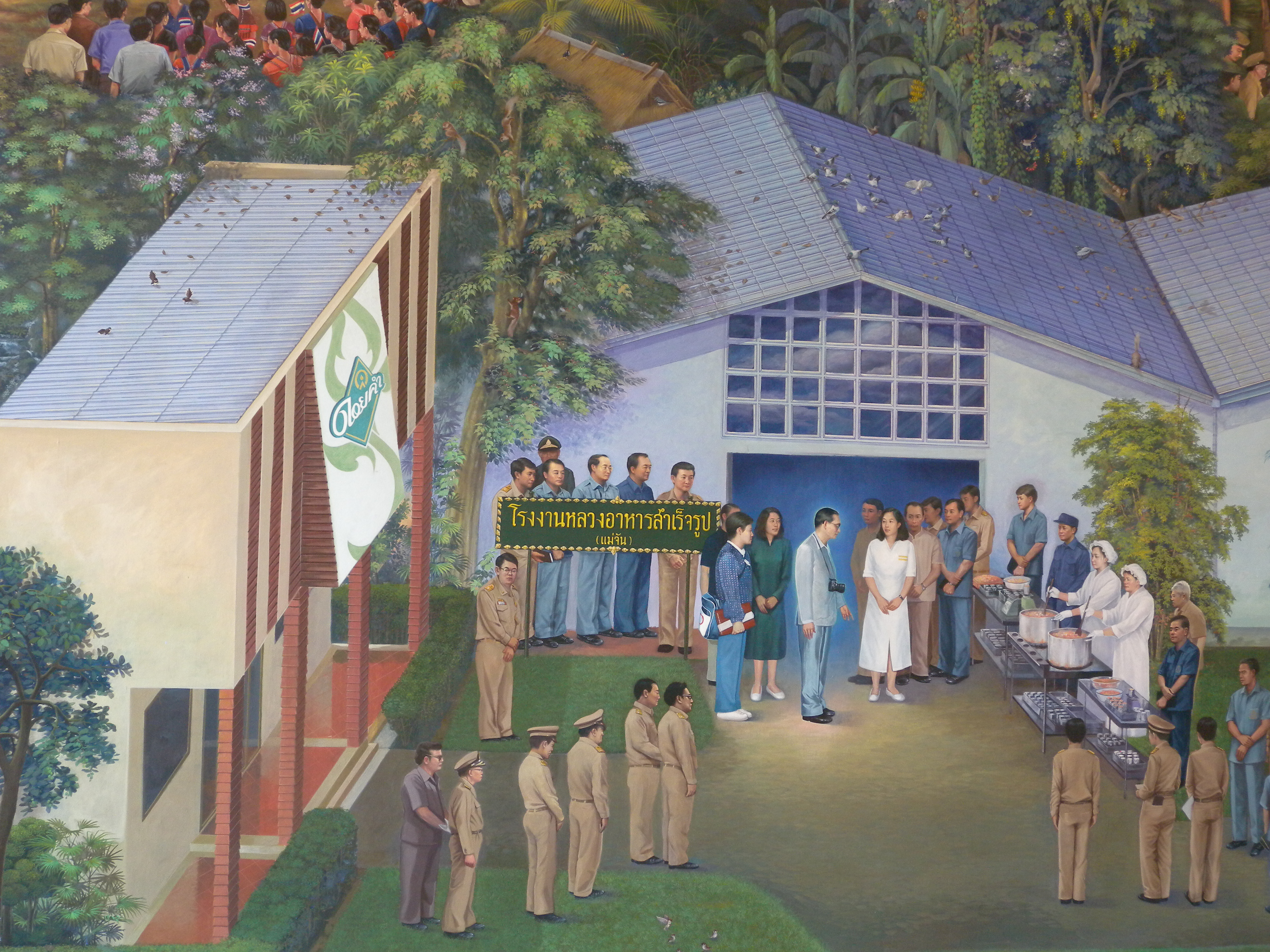
Doi Kham Factory mural painting in Songtham Pavilion at Royal crematorium of Bhumibol Adulyadej

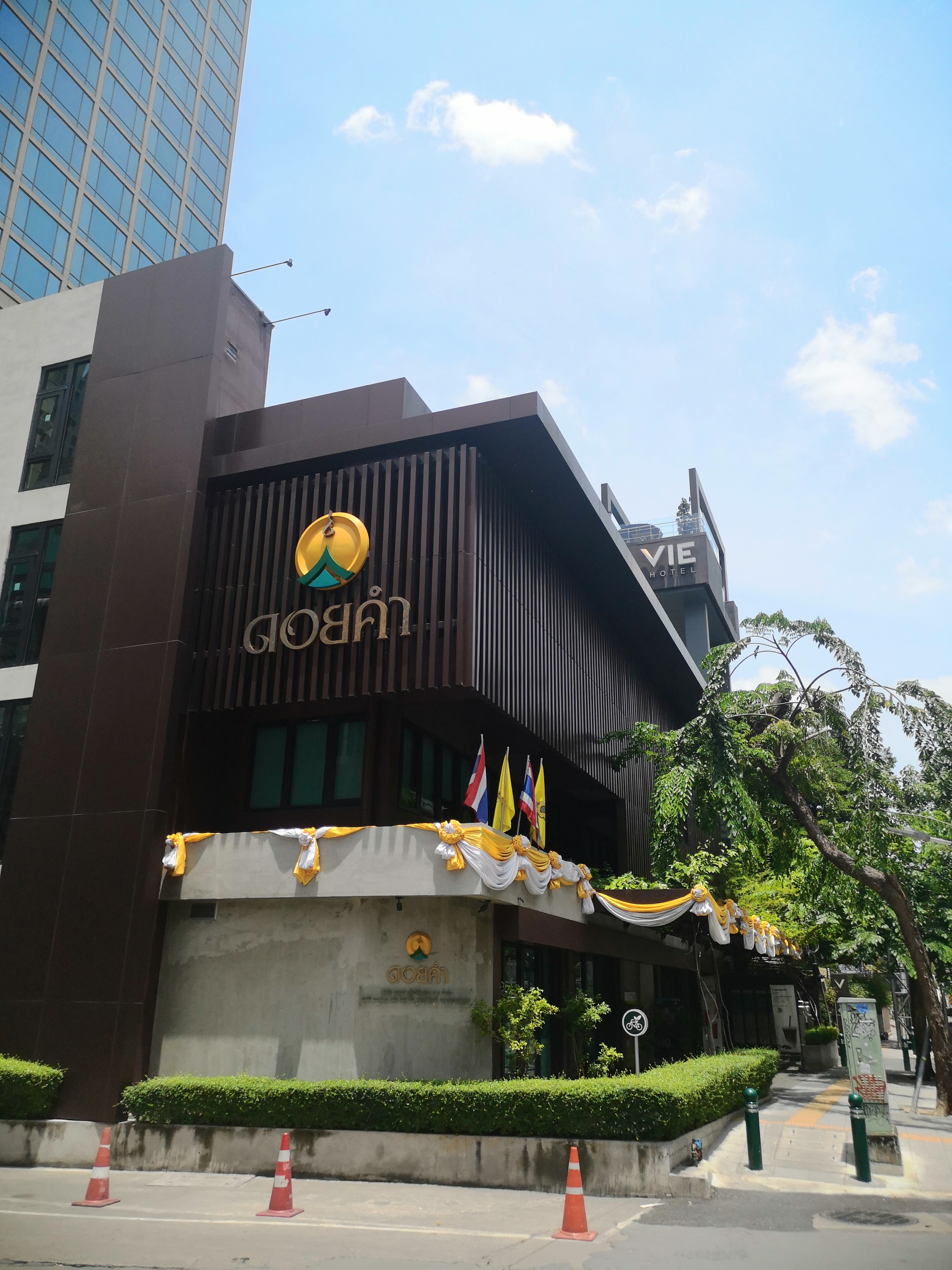
Doi Kham store at Thanon Phaya Thai

The Royal Project Foundation operates four research stations and thirty-five development centres that work with 295 villages containing 14,109 families. Involved are approximately 85,000 rural Thais and hill tribe peoples. Doi Kham Royal Project, in Chiang Mai Province, is a wealth of flowers, herbs, fruits, and vegetables that are produced in order to increase the value of agricultural products and help the farmer gain more income.

The company produces a wide variety of agricultural products including ready-to-drink fruit juices, fruit juice concentrates, dehydrated fruits, jam, honey, and flowers. Doi Kham exports 30 percent its output to the Asia Pacific region. The company objective is to support the development of Thai agricultural products and to produce goods which have a high nutritional value with no chemical additives. Their products do not contain preservatives or artificial flavors.

Doi Kham Food Products is a private limited company. In recent years it has been profitable. In 2016, the firm had revenues of 1.82 billion baht. Projections for 2017 and 2018 are 2.07 billion baht and 2.4 billion baht. Doi Kham employs total of 200 persons including five engineers and five quality assurance staff. Doi Kham has processing plants in Fang District, Chiang Mai Province; Mae Chan District, Chiang Rai Province; and Tao Ngoi District, Sakon Nakhon Province. The company has 34 retail shops nationwide.

== See also ==
- Royal Project Foundation
- Chaipattana Foundation
- Crown Property Bureau
- Royal Rainmaking Project
- Sufficiency Economy
