= Royal Rainmaking Project =

Thai artificial rainmaking project

The Thailand Royal Rainmaking Project (Thai: โครงการฝนหลวง, RTGS: khrongkan fon luang) was initiated in November 1955 by King Bhumibol Adulyadej. Thai farmers repeatedly suffered the effects of drought. The king resolved to do something about it and proposed a solution to the dearth of rain: artificial rainmaking, or cloud seeding. The program is run by the Department of Royal Rainmaking and Agricultural Aviation. There is no impact evaluation or effectiveness reported.

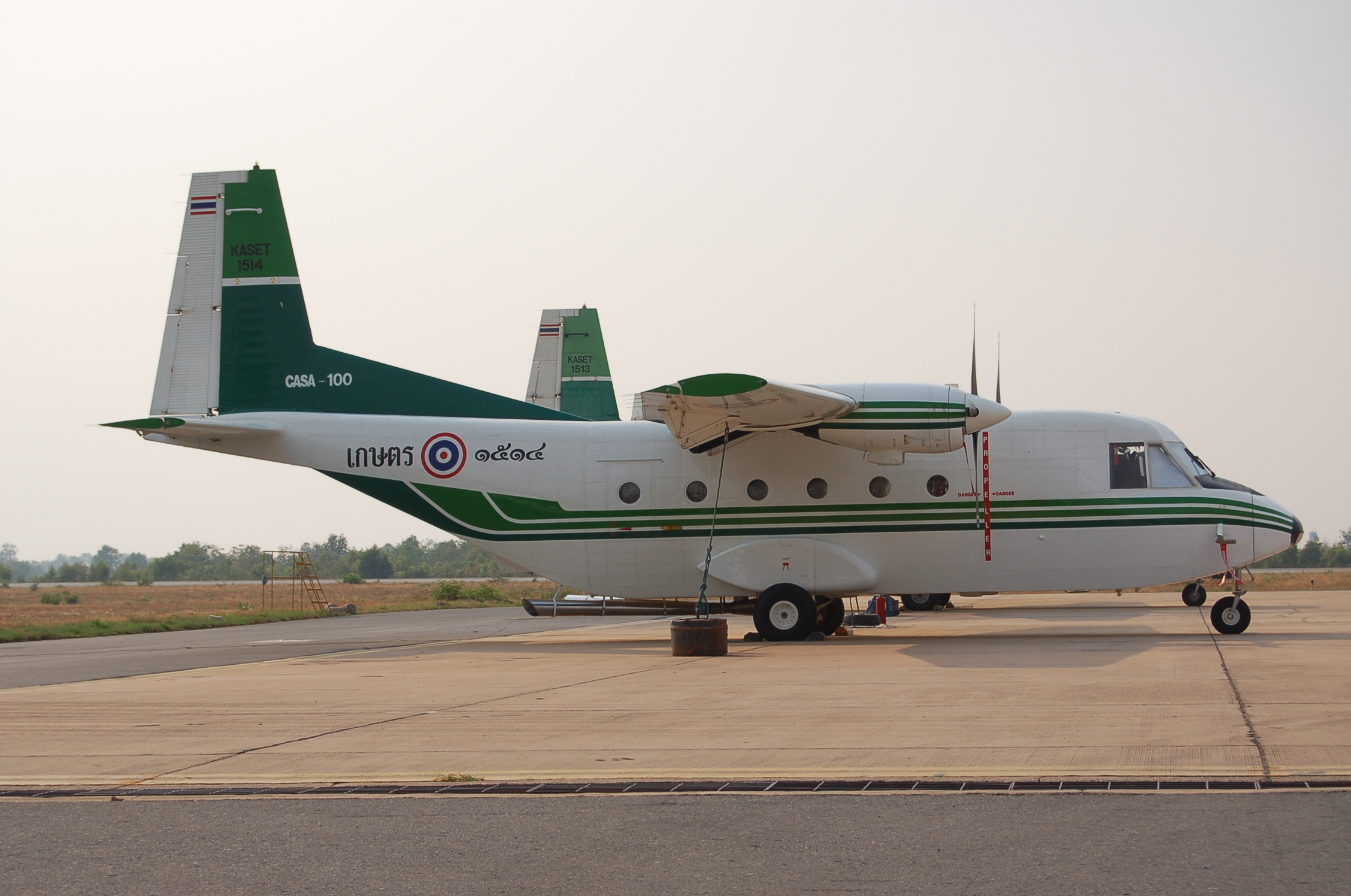
Royal Rainmaking Project aircraft at Khon Kaen Airport in 2013

== History ==
The king discovered that many areas faced the problem of drought. Over 82% of Thai agricultural land relied on rainfall. Thai farmers were not able to grow crops for lack of water. Although scientific evidence seems to suggest that cloud seeding does not ameliorate droughts, the Royal Rainmaking Project debuted on 20 July 1969 at the king's behest, when the first rainmaking attempt was made at Khao Yai National Park. Dry ice flakes were scattered over clouds. Reportedly, some rainfall resulted. In 1971, the government established the Artificial Rainmaking Research and Development Project within the Thai Ministry of Agriculture and Cooperatives.

== Recognition ==
The king received recognition for the Royal Rainmaking Project from the EUREKA organization in 2001 for an invention that is beneficial to the world. In 2009, Jordan received permission from Thailand to use the technique.

== Department of Royal Rainmaking and Agricultural Aviation ==
The Department of Royal Rainmaking and Agricultural Aviation (DRRAA) was established on 15 September 1992, reporting to the Office of the Permanent Secretary for the Ministry of Agriculture and Cooperatives. The budget of the Department of Royal Rainmaking and Agricultural Aviation in FY2019 was 2,224 million baht.

DRRAA in 2019 has flown about 6,000 rain seeding flights, up from its yearly average of 5,000 sorties. DRRAA employs 71 pilots who fly 39 cloud seeding aircraft from Royal Rain Operations Centres in Chiang Mai, Nakhon Sawan, Khon Kaen, Rayong, and Surat Thani. The department plans to open new centres in Buriram and Phitsanulok and to hire an additional 44 pilots.

In February 2018, with Bangkok suffering under a haze of ultra-fine dust, the government turned to the DRRAA to seed clouds to create artificial rain over the city. The Pollution Control Department issued warnings that particulate levels had soared to 94 micrograms per cubic metre of air in some areas, far above the safety limit of 50 mcg. The prime minister assured Thais that, "...[rainmaking] should bring some relief at least in the short term,..." Fumes from vehicles, construction sites, and factories in adjacent provinces contribute to the smog that contains dust known as particulate matter PM2.5. "The department will continue to check the weather every day and will make rain as soon as possible", said the prime minister.

== Technique ==
1. Agitation: Seeding hygroscopic chemicals stimulates a mass of air to rise higher to create humidity. This helps nature to form rain clouds, and it increases the potential amount of rainfall.
2. Fattening: Fattening of the rain clouds is done by scattering exothermic-hygroscopic chemicals to make droplets of water condense.
3. Attacking: Flying a plane through the heavy clouds accelerates the process of raindrop formation.

== See also ==
- Chaipattana Foundation
- Crown Property Bureau
- Royal Project Foundation
- Sufficiency Economy
- Silver iodide
- Weather modification
