= Royal Project Foundation =

Non-profit organization in Thailand

The Royal Project Foundation
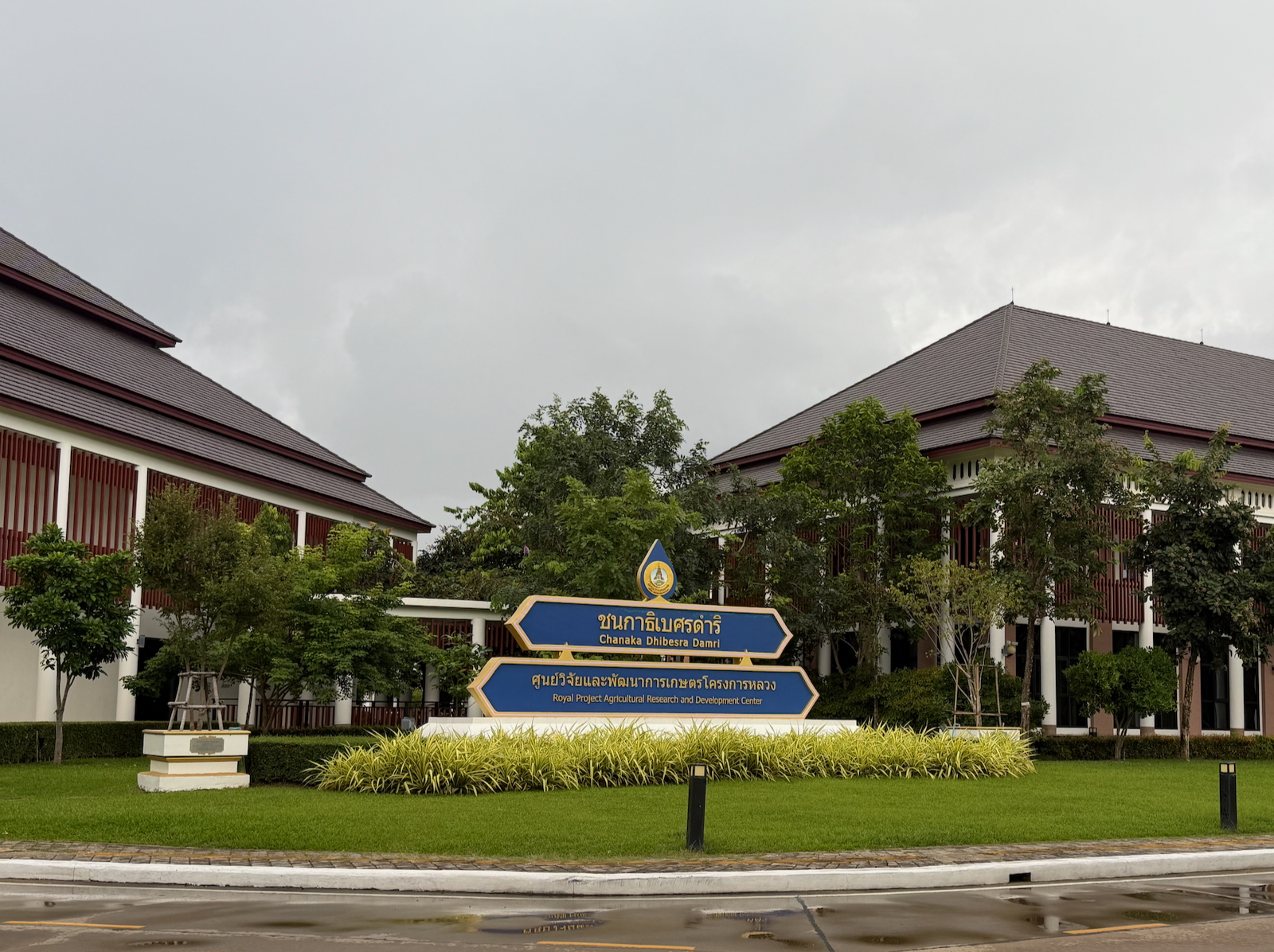
- Royal Project's Head Office, Chiang Mai
- Abbreviation: RPF
- Formation: 1969
- Type: Non-profit Organisation
- Headquarters: Mae Hia, Mueang Chiang Mai, Thailand
- Website: royalproject.org

The Royal Project Foundation is a Thai non-profit organisation based in north Thailand. It was founded by King Bhumibol Adulyadej as an umbrella organization for his charitable initiatives and research. The focus of the foundation is to improve the quality of life of hill tribes. Ancillary goals are to reduce opium-growing and to revive forests and water resources. The Royal Project Foundation is considered one of the first and most successful projects for opium production elimination. It was awarded The Ramon Magsaysay Award for International Understanding in 1988.

== History ==
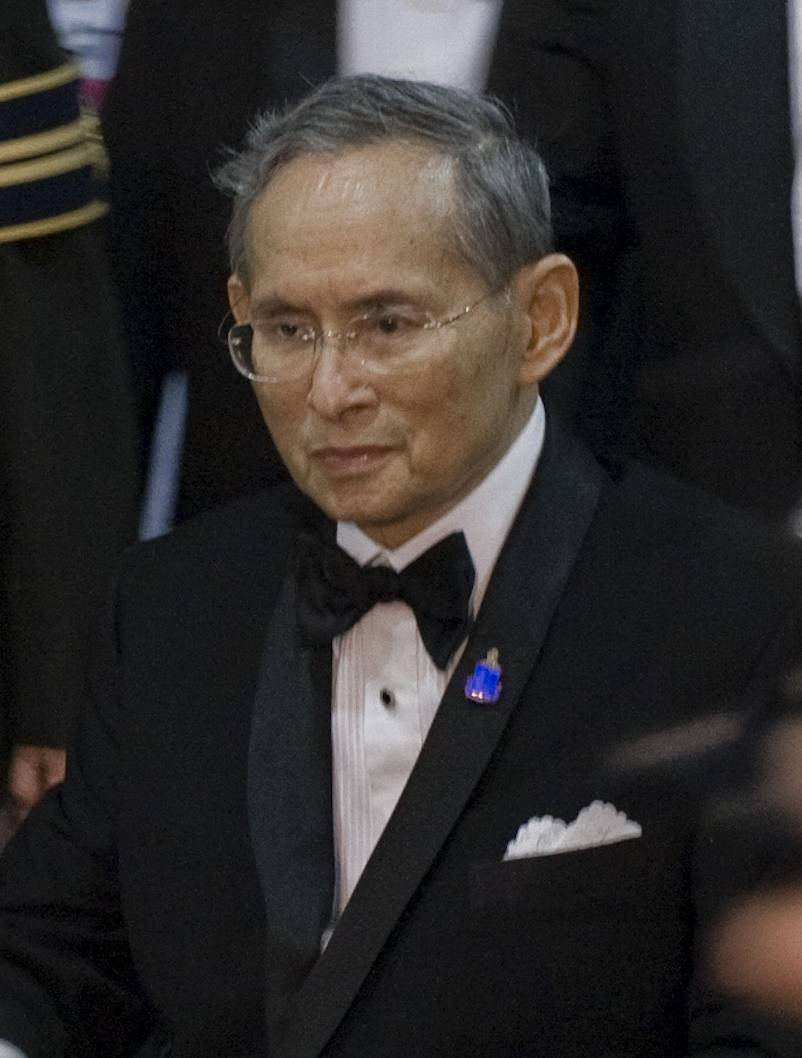
King Bhumibol Adulyadej, the founder of the Royal Project Foundation

The project began in 1969, when King Bhumibol Adulyadej visited an opium-growing hill tribe village in Doi Pui. During his visit, the king learned that a local peach could provide income for the hill tribe people. He found that the Doi PuI Development Centre, Faculty of Agriculture, Kasetsart University, was testing and developing a suitable type of peach for the environment. It could provide higher incomes to the local people than opium-growing. He instructed the Crown Property Bureau to give 200,000 baht to the project.

After the first few years, the project received support from international agencies. In 1972, the UN realised the importance of alternative agriculture to replace opium-growing. The UN/Thai Program for Drug Abuse Control was begun. Between 1973 and 1984, USDA-ARS also supported the project by giving money to the project for research and development to find the best and most suitable fruits and vegetables for the highlands.

In 1992, the royal project changed its name to the Royal Project Foundation and became a public organisation for the people's benefit permanently.

== Development centres ==
Today, the Royal Project Foundation has 38 development centres spread across five provinces in northern Thailand: Chiang Mai Province, Chiang Rai Province, Mae Hong Son Province, Lamphun Province and Phayao Province. The development centres are not only for researching and developing projects for the foundation, but some have become tourist destinations.

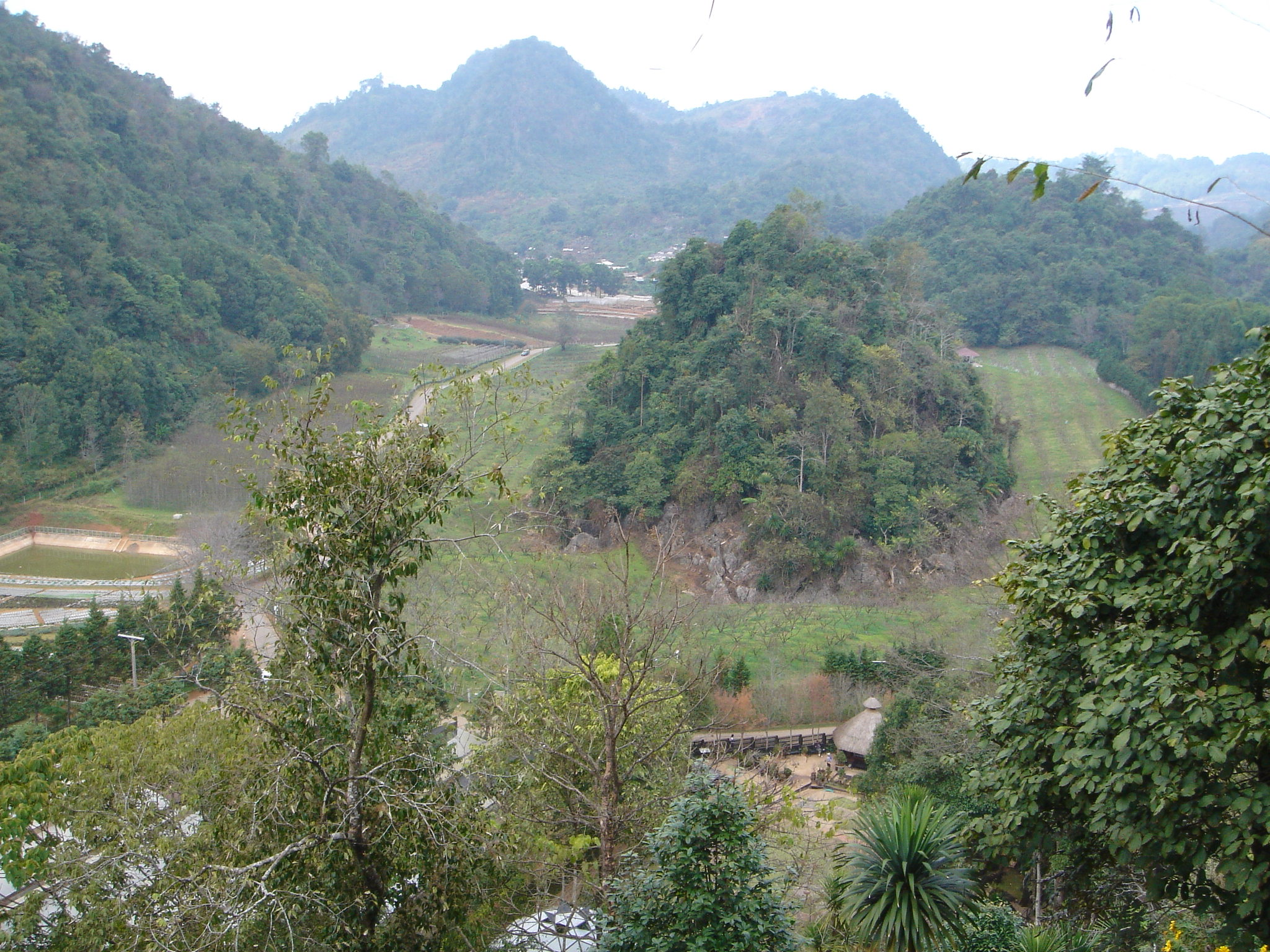
AngKhang Development Centre

In Chiang Mai, there are 27 development centres which include three Royal Agriculture Stations: Doi Ang Khang, Doi Inthanon, and Pang Da; one research station, Mae-Lod; and 23 development centres: Ka Noi, Khun Phae, Khun Wang, Teen Tok, Tung Rao, Tung Roeng, Tung Luang, Nong Khieo, Nong Hoi, Pa Mieng, Pang Ung, Mon Ngo, Mok Cham, Mae Tho, Mae The Nuier, Mae Phae, Mae Sa Pok, Mae Sa Mai, Mae Hae, Wat Chan, Haui Luk, Haui Siao, and Huai Som Poi.

In Chiang Rai, There are three development centres: Pha Tung, Mae Poon Luang, and Sa Ngo.

In Mae Hong Son, there are six centres: Mae La Noi, Mae Sariang, Huai Nam Khun, Huai Nam Rin, Huai Pong, and Huai Lang.

In Lamphun, there is one development centre, Pha Bath Huay Tom.

In Phayao, there is one development centre, Pang Cha.

== Projects ==
Projects are changing, developing and adapting to the issues that need to be solved and improved in various communities and regions of Thailand. All the projects are made to achieve the main purposes that the Royal Project Foundation has and to improve the quality of life of communities.

Currently, 4,741 projects are part of the royal initiative.

Project Type	Region					Total
Project Type	North	Central	North East	South	Misc	Total
Water Resources	1,255	511	851	631	0	3,248
Agricultural	47	51	44	28	0	170
Environmental	63	41	41	34	3	182
Career Development	89	35	121	94	0	339
Public Health	15	16	9	7	11	58
Transport / Communication	23	22	20	22	0	87
Social Welfare / Education	203	75	53	63	4	398
Integration / Other	105	62	52	33	7	259
Total	1,800	813	1,191	912	25	4,741

The Marketing Project is research on the cost and profitability of the Royal Project's fruits and vegetables. This project also studies the customer behaviour in choosing and buying the products. This is to come up with the best marketing plan for selling the project's produce.

The environmental conservation project researches the highland environment, forests, water, and soil, to optimize sustainable yields.

== See also ==
- Chaipattana Foundation
- Crown Property Bureau
- Doi Kham
- Royal Rainmaking Project
- Sufficiency Economy
