= William Hewson =

William Hewson may refer to:

- William Hewson (theological writer) (1806–1870), English Anglican cleric
- William Hewson (surgeon) (1739–1774), English surgeon, anatomist and physiologist
