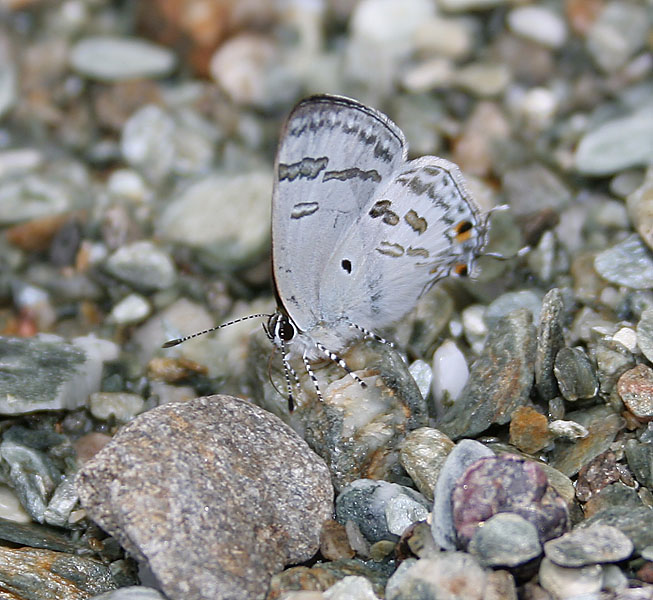
- At Samsing in Darjeeling district of West Bengal, India

Scientific classification
- Kingdom: Animalia
- Phylum: Arthropoda
- Class: Insecta
- Order: Lepidoptera
- Family: Lycaenidae
- Genus: Chliaria
- Species: C. kina

Binomial name
- Chliaria kina (Hewitson, 1869)

Synonyms
- Hypolycaena kina Hewitson, 1869 (but see text)

= Chliaria kina =

Species of butterfly

The blue tit is a species of lycaenid or blue butterfly found in parts of South Asia and Southeast Asia. It was traditionally called Chliaria kina but the genus Chliaria is merged into Hypolycaena by many recent authors.

== Description ==
Each hindwing of this butterfly has two tails. Both the male and female have pale grey markings of the same colour and a distinctive black edge on the underside of the wings. These markings are similar to an orchid tit (Chliaria othona) pattern. There are no particular print markings below the costal vein at the anterior of the forewings. The male species have a pale-blue print above the costal vein on the forewing and the upperside of the hindwings are broadly black bordered. The posterior area between the borders and the coral vein are violet in colour. The females of the species have a dark brown colour with black borders above the coral vein and a white discal posterior section. On both sexes the veins appear very dark on the upperside of the hindwings.

== Distribution ==
The species is found in northwest India, from the Doon Valley to Assam, Bhutan, Burma to Thailand, Laos, Vietnam, Peninsular Malaya, Tsekou [Yanmen, Yunnan] Taiwan.

Distribution records of Chliaria kina in India

== Status ==
Locally, it is not rare.

== See also ==
- Lycaenidae
- List of butterflies of India (Lycaenidae)
