= Anne Phillips (geologist) =

British geologist

- Born: 18 March 1803; Midford, Somerset, England
- Died: 29 May 1862 (aged 59); The Malvern Hills, England
- Resting place: York Cemetery, York, England

Anne Phillips (1803–1862) was a British geologist. She is most notable for discovering a fragment of conglomerate that helped clarify the history of the Malvern Hills. She also worked as an assistant to her brother John Phillips who was also a geologist.

== Biography ==
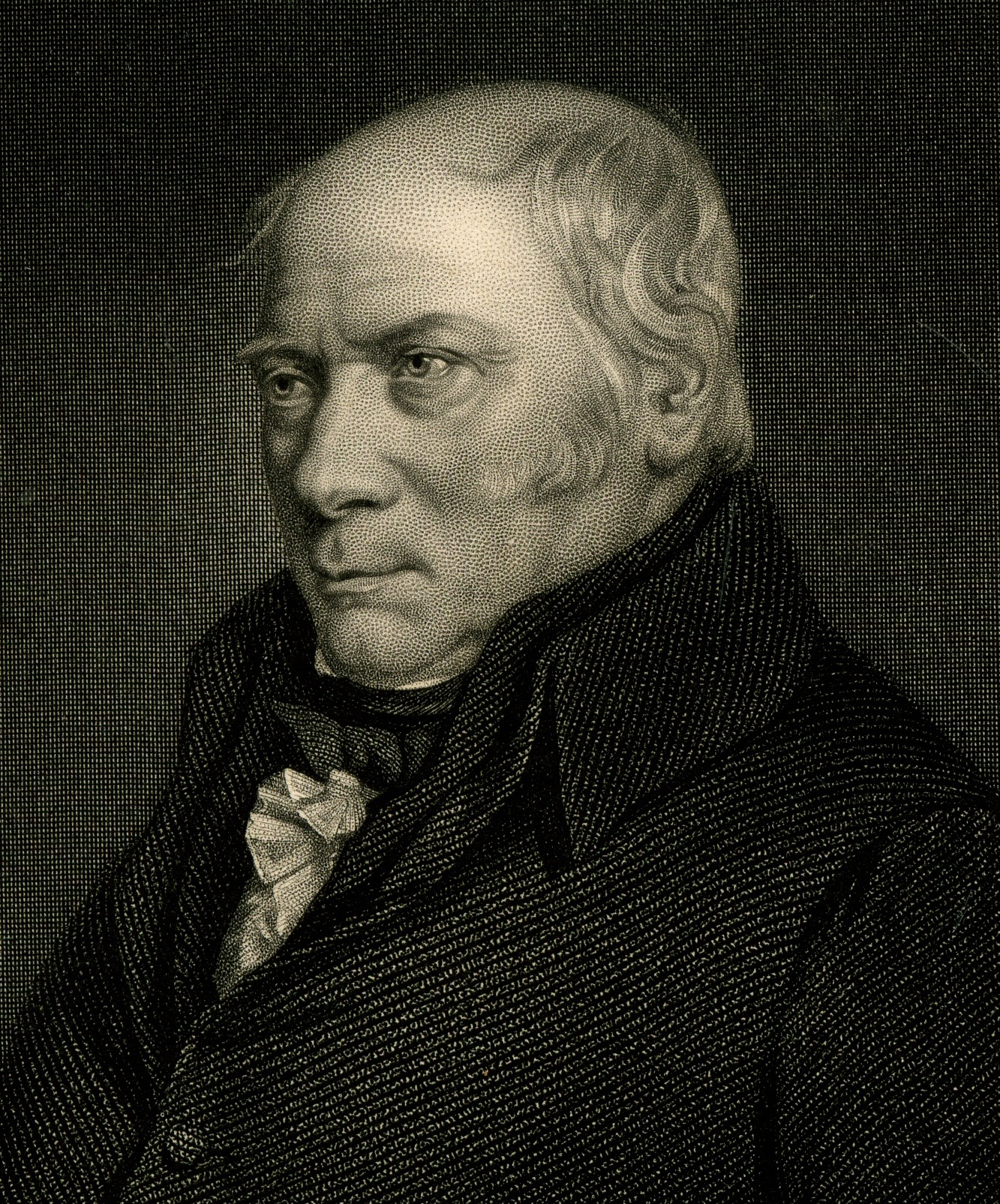
Phillips' uncle, the geologist William Smith

Anne Phillips was born in Midford, Somerset, in 1803 along with her two other siblings, John (1800-1874) and Jenkin (b. 1807). After the birth of her brother in 1800, the family moved to Midford and they are believed to have stayed at a property, Tucking Mill House, owned by her uncle William Smith. Smith was a geologist known for authoring the first geological map of England and developing the basis for the science of stratigraphy. The family moved to Steeple Aston, Oxfordshire after Anne was born in 1803. Then after four years, the youngest child of the family, Jenkin, was born in 1807. The family subsequently moved to Coventry (then in Warwickshire). Although some information has been published through letters from her brother John, much of Anne's upbringing and education remains a mystery. Anne was a supporter of the feminist movement and wanted her work to be seen by everyone regardless of her gender.

Her father, the elder John Phillips, died in Coventry in January 1808, and her mother Elizabeth died in July after the family had moved to her hometown of Churchill, Somerset. Following the death of her mother, Anne's maternal uncles took care of the orphans. Daniel Smith looked after Jenkin in the village of Churchill, near Chipping Norton in Oxfordshire, while William Smith took John and Anne to Broadfield Farm, which was owned by John Smith.

=== Relationship with John Phillips ===
Having been orphaned at a young age, Phillips and her brother John became close. In 1829, for unknown reasons, Anne was residing in the home of Monsieur and Madame Goussaerts in Chateau Koekelberg, in Belgium. John arranged to meet her in Brussels, then later in Paris. During their meeting in Paris, John asked Anne to return to York, where he would supply Anne with employment. In 1829 she was appointed as his housekeeper, a position she held for thirty-three years. In September of the same year, she began aiding John in his geological work. Both remained unmarried; he regarded her with great respect and depended on her, including with his work. His scientific colleagues accepted her because of their close relationship and, most likely, her geographic knowledge. John's letters present evidence for Anne’s intellectual accomplishments by asking about the details of geologic studies with the use of his drawings and requesting her applied geological assistance.

Anne became involved in her brother John's geological work, working primarily as his field assistant starting in 1829. John Phillips worked to further William Smith's ideas on using fossils to prove stratigraphy correct. One of John Phillips greatest contributions was naming the major geological eras (Paleozoic, Mesozoic, and Cenozoic) and the mass extinctions that separated them. John Phillips initially believed that Murchison's accepted view on formation was wrong and his sister helped prove his doubts right. John Phillips' success can be attributed to years of hard work but also the support of his sister Anne. The 234 letters written by John to his sister help us understand that Anne was able to provide John plenty of scientific and emotional support for her brother.

Many of the contributions made by Anne Phillips were unknown until the letters of her brother were later transcribed by Nina Morgan, a geologist and science writer. Many of these letters reveal the extent of her contributions in John Phillips work, such as in The Guide to Geology. Though it is strongly suggested by William Smith that Anne was a major contributor of the work presented in the book.

== Scientific contributions ==
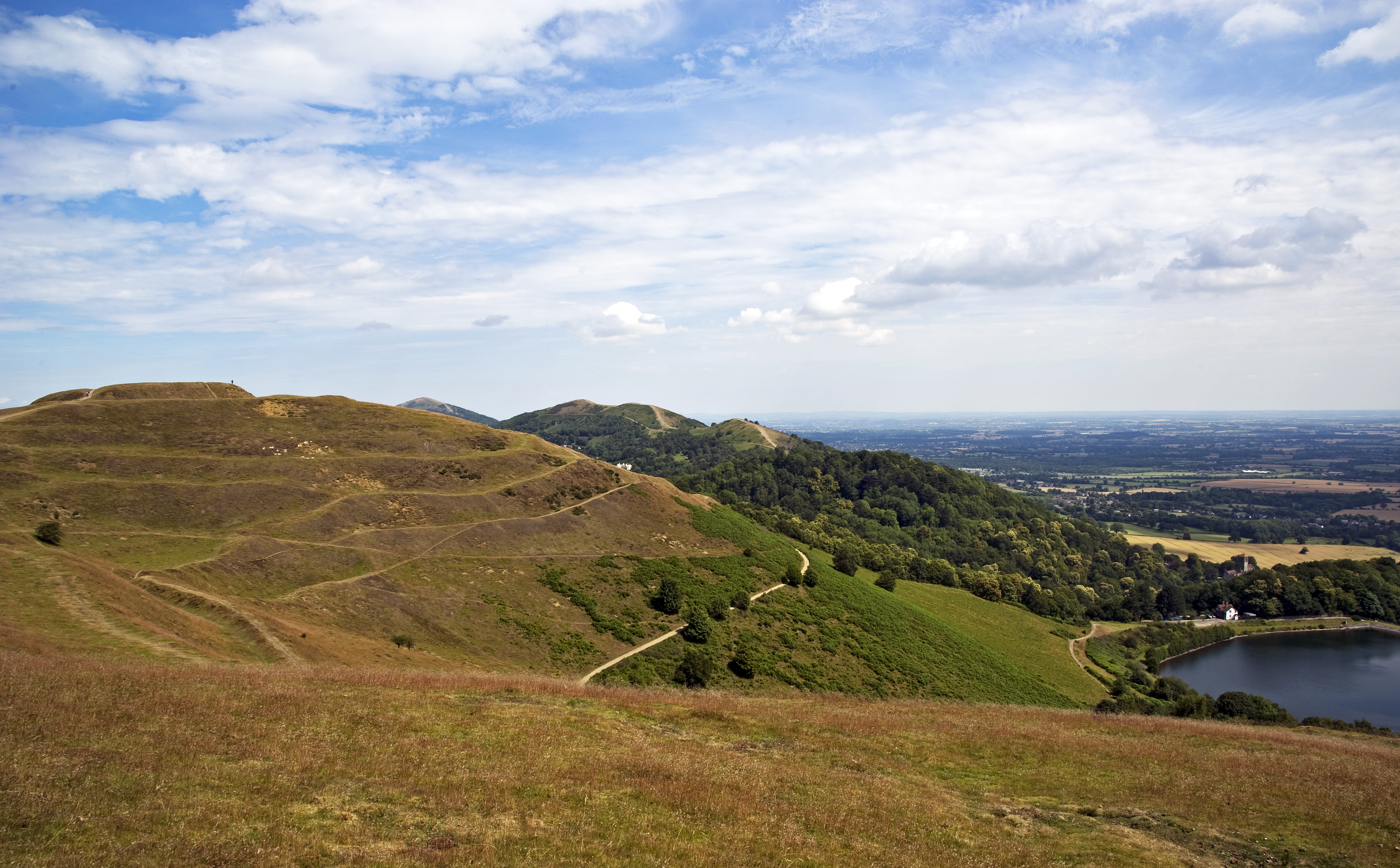
The Malvern hills in England

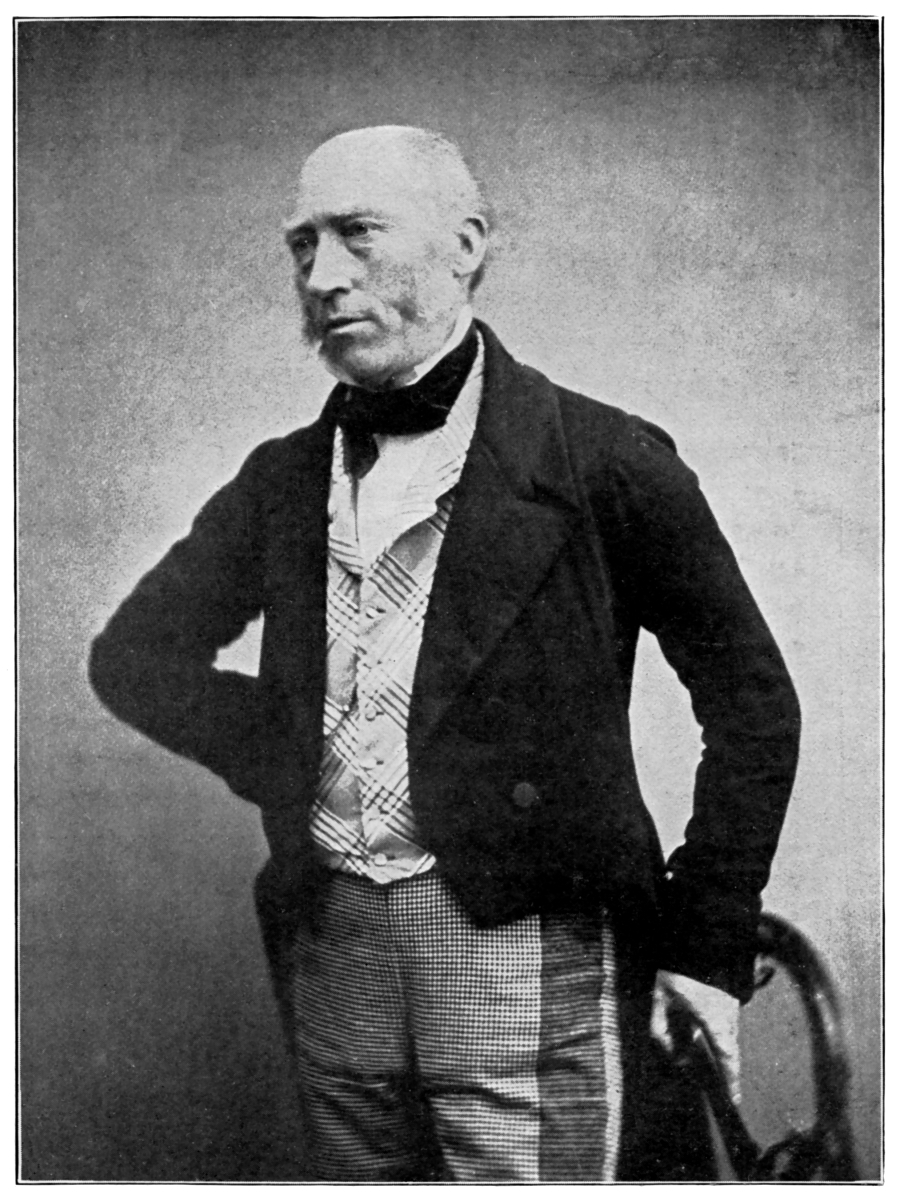

Her most notable geological achievement was the discovery of scattered broken pieces conglomerate, now known as Miss Phillips Conglomerate. This type of rock became popular as samples of it soon became collectable items on geological field trips.

Sir Roderick Murchison was the primary advocate of the first Malvern theory which was labelled "The Silurian system". This system asserted that first the Silurian sediments were formed, and afterwards were interjected with the hot rock of the Malvern Ridge. He felt that the Malvern ridge was intruded as a hot body after the Silurian sediments were laid down. Miss Phillips Conglomerate supported the position of John Phillips. Phillips believed that the Silurians are not truly changed by the intrusives even though they are in sparing contact with them. The piece of evidence credited to Anne Phillips was the literal conglomerate of rock she found in the Malverns that demonstrated that her brother's theory was in fact the correct one, as it showed the two different types of rock meeting without any sort of overrunning of one into the other.

In 1842, Anne, accompanied by her brother and his employer, Sir Henry De la Beche, located a place where conglomerate could be seen in contact with one or more intrusive rocks. This survey proved the idea of how rocks in the Malvern Hills were initially moulded, and how the Silurian Sediments were positioned by an ancient sea that broke down due to the Malvern’s igneous shores. This was a major geological contribution as it resolved the mystery at the time of the origin of these hills and proved Sir Rodrick Impey Murchison wrong. Sir Rodrick was a British geologist and the husband of Scottish geologist, Charlotte Murchison. He had argued that the igneous rocks were younger than the Silurian sediments which then formed and made their way up. However, Anne discovered an outcrop of conglomerate containing fragments of igneous hills near the Dingle Quarry in Malvern, proving Murchison's theory as incorrect. Malvern hills contain many rocks that have Precambrian (Malvernian) igneous obtrusions that are put together by “ Sienitic” rocks. A cross-section of the Malvern Hills can be observed to contain Triassic, and Cambrian sandstones as well as marls located on the eastern side, and Cambrian and Silurian sediments located on the west side. This meant the Malvern hills had formed first. The conglomerate provided an anti-murchisonian theory (a belief that the Malvern Hills were younger than the Silurian Sediments). John gave his sister full credit for the discovery of the conglomerate. The report of the discovery was published in London, Edinburgh and Dublin Philosophical Magazine and Journal of Science in October 1842:

"My sister, knowing the interest I felt in tracing out the history of the stratification visible in these trap hills, sought diligently for organic remains … In this most unpromising search she was entirely successful, and collected … several masses richly charged with organic remains"

In the article he explains that his sister knew about how much he was interested in finding the history of the hills and how he was looking for organic remains. Phillips was not publicly recognized for any further discoveries; however. In the letters, he also asks for geological help and refers to the work she did for his Guide to Geology, as he goes on to say that it was 'Your Little Book'. In a 1864 review written by Longmans it is noted that John was not yet a professor but was Secretary of the British Association and a member of the Royal Society. Longman states the first edition included problems of mineral composition, rock masses, distribution of life, and formation of igneous rock.

Anne and John had a good relationship with William Smith and they always kept in touch. Smith acknowledged Anne’s work and referred to the contributions she made to her brother’s book. In one of his letters to Anne he thanked her for the second edition of John’s book Guide to Geology and wrote that her love for fossils encouraged him to do more searches. Miss Phillips conglomerate have become collector’s items in present day.

It is believed that Anne may have contributed to more geologic research.

== Death and legacy ==
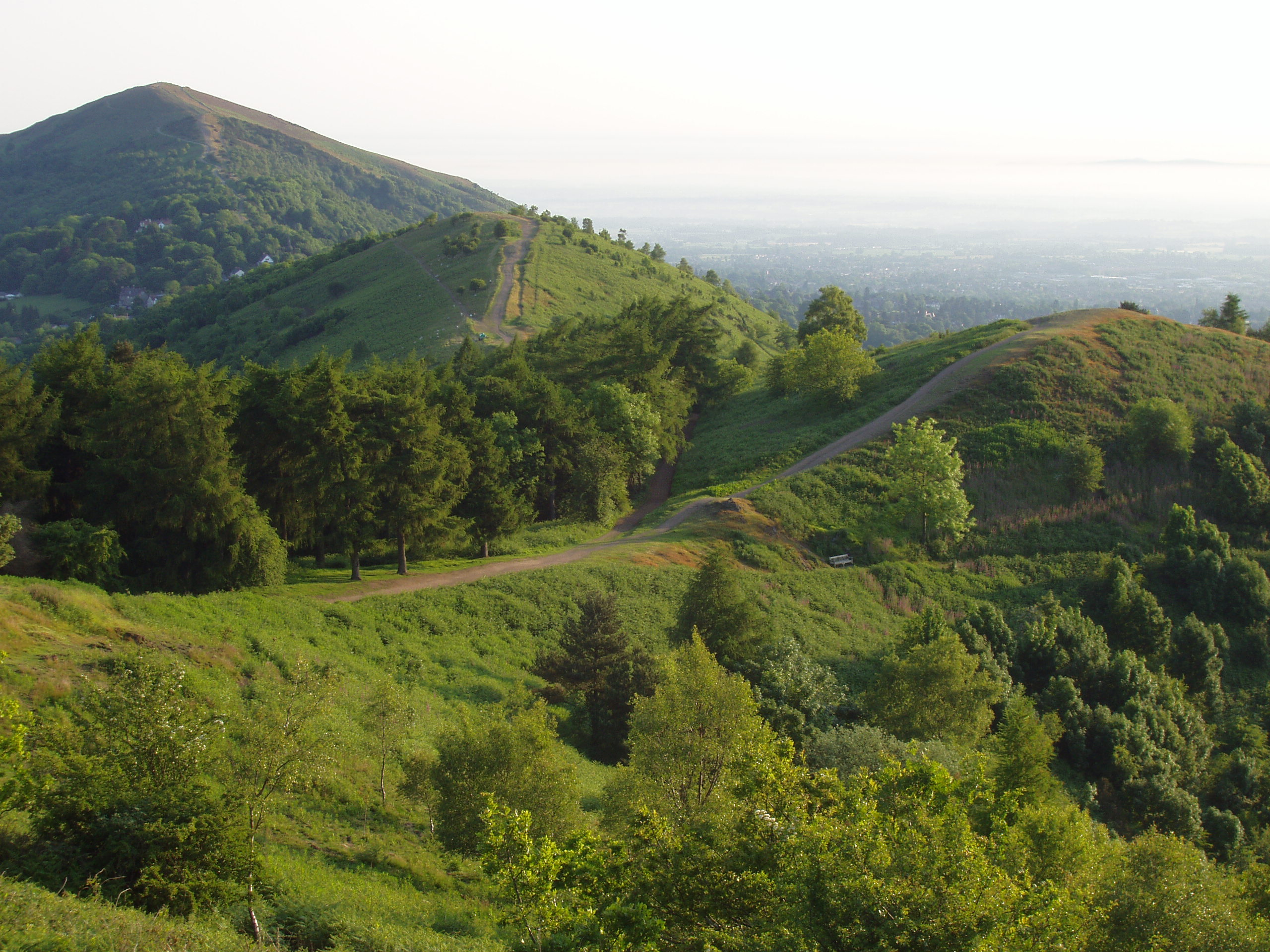
The Malvern Hills

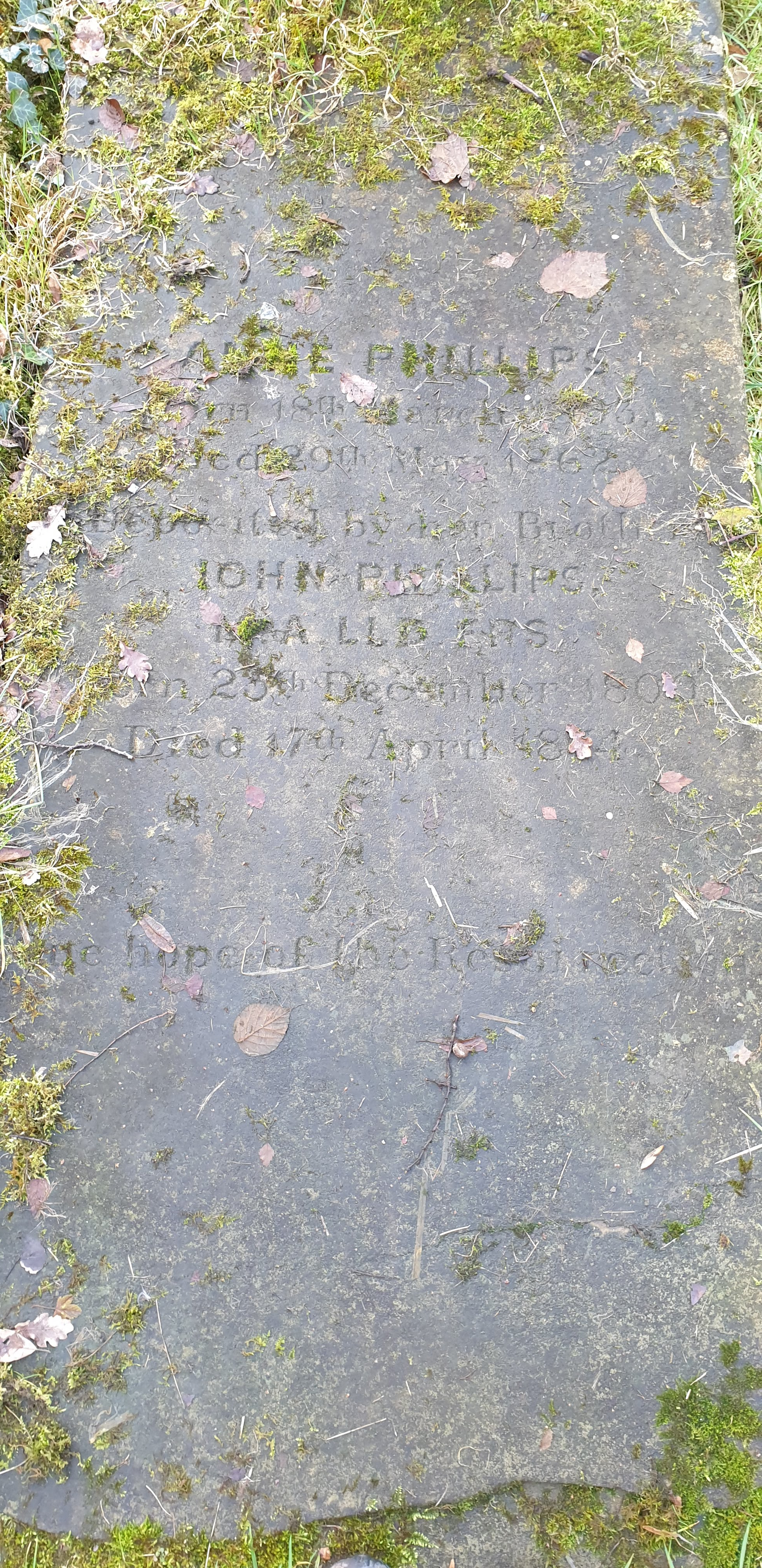
Anne's grave in York Cemetery

Over the course of her life, Anne Phillips acted mainly as John's geological companion. Much of the scientific contribution made by Anne's brother, John Smith, heavily relied on Anne’s support that she provided him in his personal and professional life. She provided both practical assistance and input on more complicated geological matters. Towards the end of 1862, Anne Phillips moved to a household that was rented by her brother, where she aided him by sorting and cataloging the fossils and minerals he collected. Her legacy remains in much of John’s work, specifically the second edition of Guide to Geology which is referred to as her “little book” due to her contributions to it.

One of Anne’s most known legacies is her work in Malvern Hills, where the rock became known as Miss. Phillips Conglomerate.

Anne died in 1862. She is buried alongside her brother, John Phillips, in the York Cemetery. The Hope Library at the Oxford University Museum of Natural History holds 234 letters sent between John Phillips and Anne Phillips.

Information currently known about Anne was taken from the letters written by her brother John, given that none of her own letters are intact.

== Education ==
Little is known about Anne's formal education. There is a strong suggestion that Anne Philips was very well educated and the education may come from her uncle and her brother. Anne Phillips was introduced to geology through her uncle and brother, starting at an early age. Anne Phillips shadowed her brother, John Phillips, and discovered an important piece of evidence that is now known as “Miss Phillips’ Conglomerate”.
