= Preecha Ruangjan =

Thai politician

- ปรีชา เรืองจันทร์
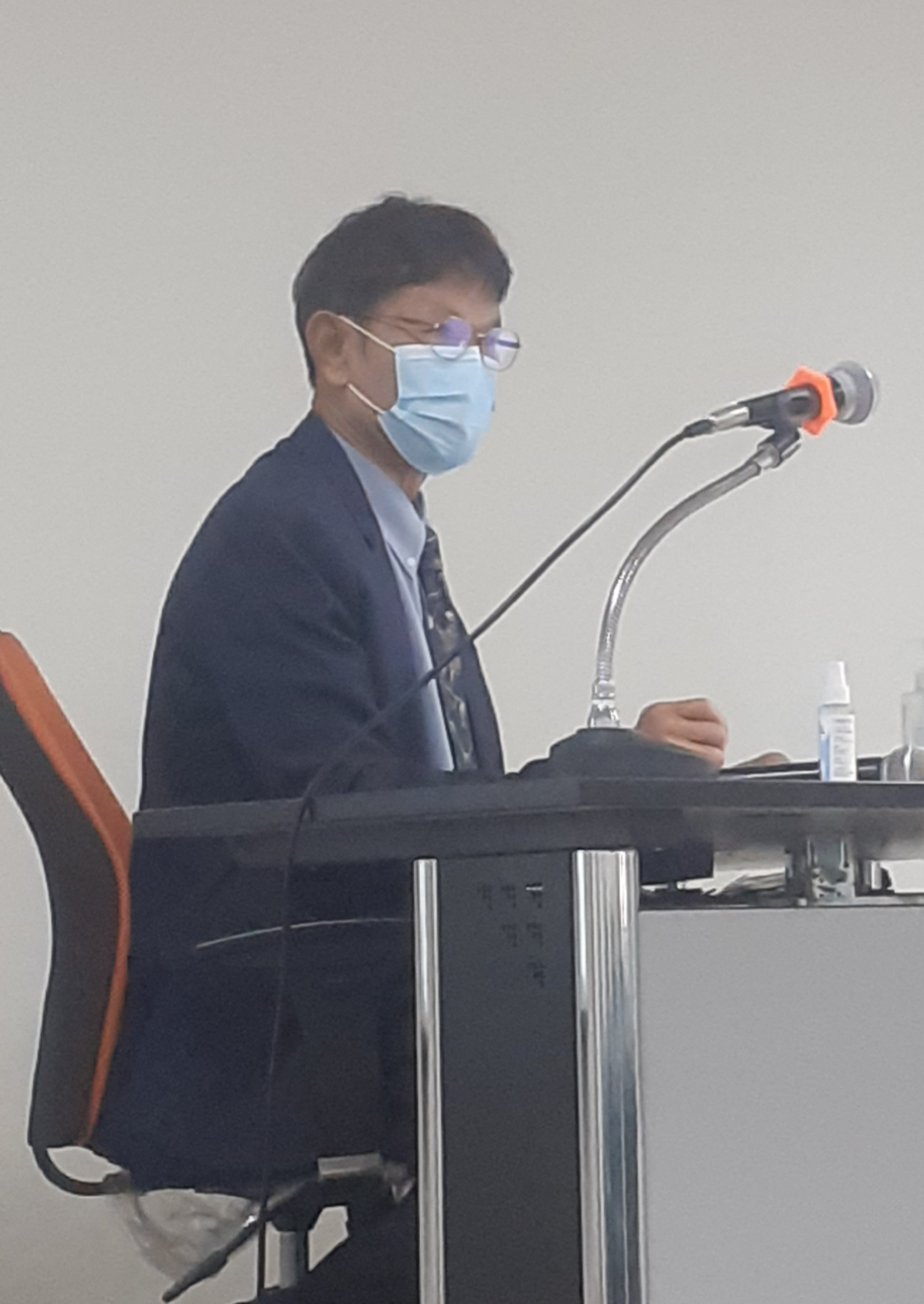
- Ruangjan in 2023

43rd and 45 th Governor of Phitsanulok
- In office 2009–2012
- Preceded by: Somboon Sriphatthanarak
- Succeeded by: Chairoj Meedaeng
- In office 2012–2013
- Preceded by: Chairoj Meedaeng
- Succeeded by: Raphee Phongboonkit

Personal details
- Born: 4 June 1955 (age 70) Phichit Province, Thailand
- Spouse: Piyathida Nararak
- Children: P. Praphassanan Ruangjan; P. Nonthanan Ruangjan
- Occupation: governner · farmer · professor
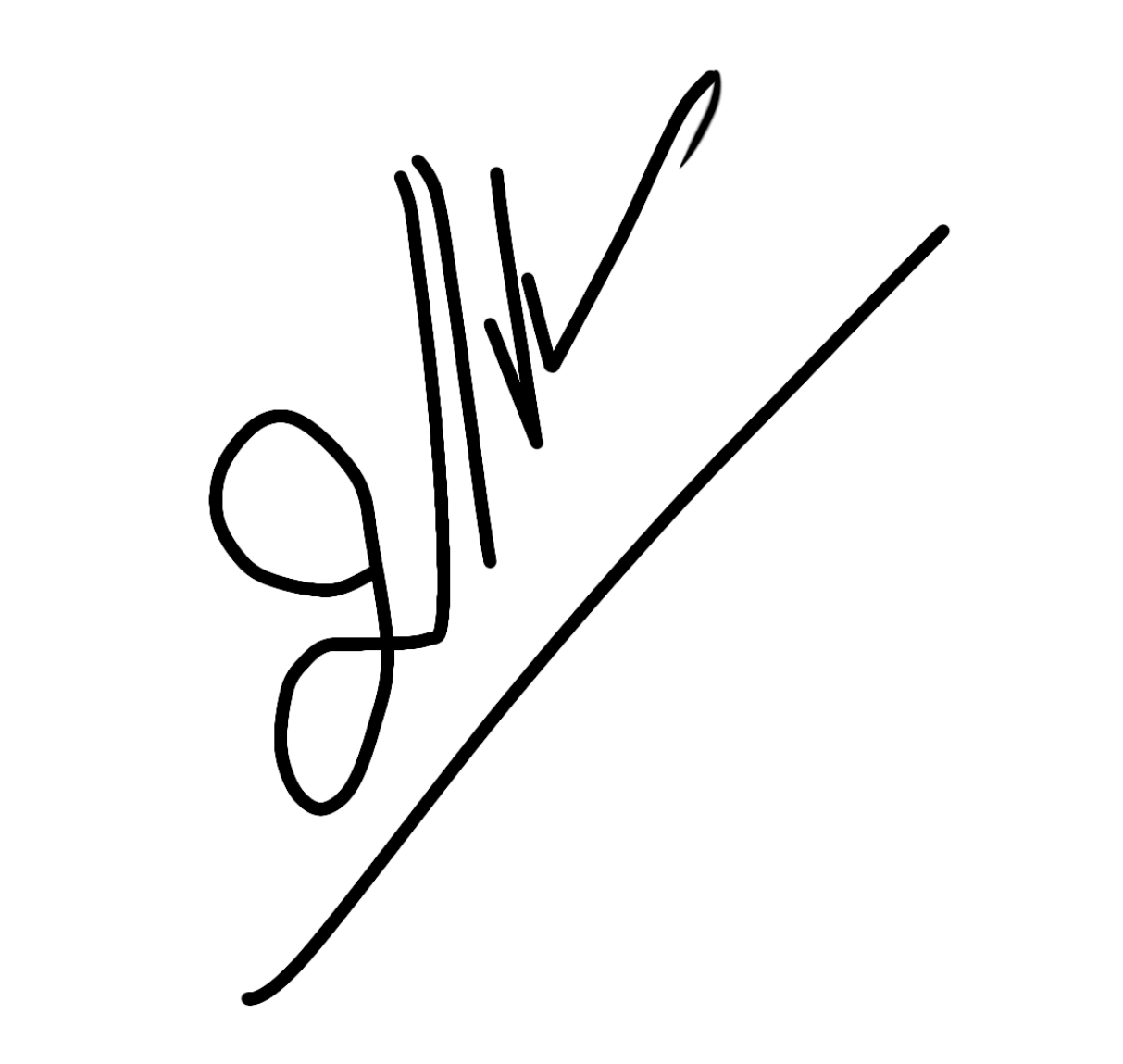
- Signature

Preecha Ruangjan (Thai: ปรีชา เรืองจันทร์, Born on 4 June 1955 –) is a Thai civil servant. He served as governor of Phuket Province, Nakhon Sawan Province, Phichit Province and Phitsanulok Province. He was a professor in Naresuan University.

== Early life ==
He was born on 4 June 1955 in a poor farmer family. He graduated primary from Wat Nong Kophai School and returned to help his family to farm. He completed high school and attended the Faculty of Political Science (International Relations) at Chulalongkorn University. He graduated with a bachelor's degree, and a doctorate in political studies from Cebu Doctors' University.

== Career ==
In 1975, he served as government policy scholar at Phetchabun province. He the served as assistant district officer, and assistant province officer at many settlements. In 2008, he attended the governor at Phuket Province until 2009. He transferred to governor at Nakhon Sawan Province, Phichit Province and Phitsanulok Province until he retired in 2014. Much of the Thai people's cultural identity reflects his role as a Thai monarchist and support for a sufficiency economy, in line with Thai king Bhumibol Adulyadej.

== Personal life ==
He married Piyathida Nararak. and raised two children, including P. Praphassanan Ruangjan and P. Nonthanan Ruangjan.
