= Sufficiency economy =

Thai development approach

Sufficiency economy (Thai: เศรษฐกิจพอเพียง, romanized: Setthakit Phophiang) is the name of a Thai development approach attributed to King Bhumibol Adulyadej's "sufficiency economy philosophy" (SEP). It has been elaborated upon by Thai academics and agencies, promoted by the Government of Thailand, and applied by over 23,000 villages in Thailand that have SEP-based projects in operation.

== History ==
Soon after ascending to the throne in 1946, King Bhumibol Adulyadej toured the country and became aware of the hardships facing Thai farmers. At that time, the per capita GDP was about US$200. He took a keen interest in rural development and instituted a number of royal projects to help the lot of the rural impoverished.

The sufficiency economy philosophy was elaborated upon in the king's speeches to students at Kasetsart University in 1974 and Khon Kaen University. To the latter, he said, "Development of the country must proceed in stages. First of all, there must be a foundation with the majority of the people having enough to live on by using methods and equipment that are economical but technically correct as well. When such a secure foundation is adequately ready and operational, then it can be gradually expanded and developed to raise prosperity and the economic standard to a higher level by stages."

The concept of the sufficiency economy came to prominence during the 1997 Asian financial crisis, when the king told a nationwide television audience, "Recently, so many projects have been implemented, so many factories have been built, that it was thought Thailand would become a little tiger, and then a big tiger. People were crazy about becoming a tiger...Being a tiger is not important. The important thing for us is to have a sufficient economy. A sufficient economy means to have enough to support ourselves..."

== Sufficiency economy ==
Three interrelated components and two underlying conditions are central to the SEP's application. The three components are "reasonableness" (or "wisdom"), "moderation", and "prudence". The two essential underlying conditions are "knowledge" and "morality". In contrast to the concept that the primary duty of a company is to maximize profits for the benefit of shareholders, the SEP emphasizes maximizing the interests of all stakeholders and having a greater focus on long-term profitability as opposed to short-term success.

The Chaipattana Foundation has said the sufficiency economy is "...a method of development based on moderation, prudence, and social immunity, one that uses knowledge and virtue as guidelines in living".

A chapter entitled "Buddhist Economics" in E. F. Schumacher's 1973 book, Small Is Beautiful, provides much of the intellectual underpinning of King Bhumibol's sufficiency economy theories. The king was moved to translate it—it is not clear if he translated only the chapter or the book in its entirety—into the Thai language.

The sufficiency economy is not a theory about how the economy of a country works but rather a guide for making decisions that will produce outcomes beneficial to development. According to Thailand's National Economic and Social Development Board:

"Sufficiency Economy is a philosophy that stresses the middle path as an overriding principle for appropriate conduct by the populace at all levels. This applies to conduct starting from the level of families to communities and to the nation in terms of development and administration, so as to modernize in line with the forces of globalization. 'Sufficiency' means moderation, reasonableness, and the need for self-immunity to protect from impacts arising from internal and external change. To achieve sufficiency, an application of knowledge with due consideration and prudence is essential. In particular, great care is needed in the utilization of theories and methodologies for planning and implementation in every step. At the same time, it is essential to strengthen the moral fiber of the nation, so that everyone, particularly public officials, academics, and business people at all levels, adhere first and foremost to the principles of honesty and integrity. In addition, a way of life based on patience, perseverance, diligence, wisdom and prudence is indispensable in creating balance and in coping appropriately with critical challenges arising from extensive and rapid socioeconomic, environmental, and cultural changes in the world".

The Oxford Business Group's 2016 report on Thailand says, "the sufficiency economy concept puts sustainability at its very core" and "is now seen as an important contributor to the UN's international development goals...advancing a different approach from short-term shareholder value-centred ideas of economic development."

== Translating philosophy into action ==
The Thai governmental organisation most responsible for implementing the sufficiency economy is the National Economic and Social Development Board (NESDB). Its primary tool for mobilising action is the publication National Economic and Development Plan.

After the 2006 coup d'état, the military junta claimed that the policies of deposed Prime Minister Thaksin Shinawatra were inconsistent with the king's philosophy. The preamble of the junta's new constitution stated that promotion of self-sufficiency was one of the fundamental roles of the state.

The junta-appointed prime minister, Surayud Chulanont, pledged to allocate 10 billion baht (US$300 million) for projects to promote well-being in line with King Bhumibol's sufficiency economy principle. He made the pledge while participating in King Bhumibol's 80th birthday celebrations.

== Pit thong lang phra ==
Pit thong lang phra (Thai: ปิดทองหลังพระ; lit. 'putting gold [leaf] on the back of the Buddha image') is a Thai idiom meaning "to eschew praise for one's good deeds". It is the name of a royal initiative to foster rural development using the philosophy of the sufficiency economy. Founded in 2008, the project was first deployed for five years in Nan, Udon Thani, Phetchaburi, Uthai Thani, and Kalasin provinces. It enabled farmers in 2,017 families to earn 285 million baht in income. The second phase was aimed at assisting farmers in Khon Kaen's Ubolratana district and 21 villages in Yala, Pattani, and Narathiwat provinces.

== Critiques ==
Many economists were, for the most part, left confused by the meaning of "sufficiency economy". After a meeting with Thai Ministry of Finance officials, in which the need for more sufficiency was lauded, the Standard & Poor's director of sovereign ratings admitted that "No one knows what [sufficiency economy] really means". The Asia Times noted that "There is a concurrent risk that the royal philosophy will be twisted by less scrupulous government officials as an opportunity to abuse their authority for rent-seeking and extortion, particularly among foreign-invested concerns".

There have been efforts by the military government to incorporate the king's sufficiency economy into the national economic policy. Thai critics have generally been careful to direct their criticisms towards the military rather than the king, out of fear of prosecution for lèse majesté. Consequently, criticisms have most often been targeted at ineffective application rather than disagreement in principle.

Professor Kevin Hewison, director of the Carolina Asia Center at the University of North Carolina, has been critical of the sufficiency economy. He has written that, "Sufficiency Economy is essentially about keeping the poor in their place. The people and organisations that promote SE are a wonderfully contradictory lot. The king, promoting moderation, sits at the head of a family and institutional wealth that is huge, based on land ownership and large capitalist corporations. The Crown Property Bureau's known institutional wealth is estimated at more than US$40 billion.... Prime Minister Surayud spends considerable time talking up SE and his government has made huge budget allocations to SE activities. Meanwhile, Surayud has declared collections of luxury cars and watches and expensive homes, despite having been on a relatively low military salary his entire career. The contradictions are massive. For the wealthy, SE means that they can enjoy their wealth so long as they do so within their means. For the poor, the advice is to make do. In class terms, SE becomes an ideology to justify inequalities.

== See also ==
- Doi Kham
- Royal Project Foundation
