= John Phillips (geologist) =

English geologist (1800–1874)

John Phillips FRS
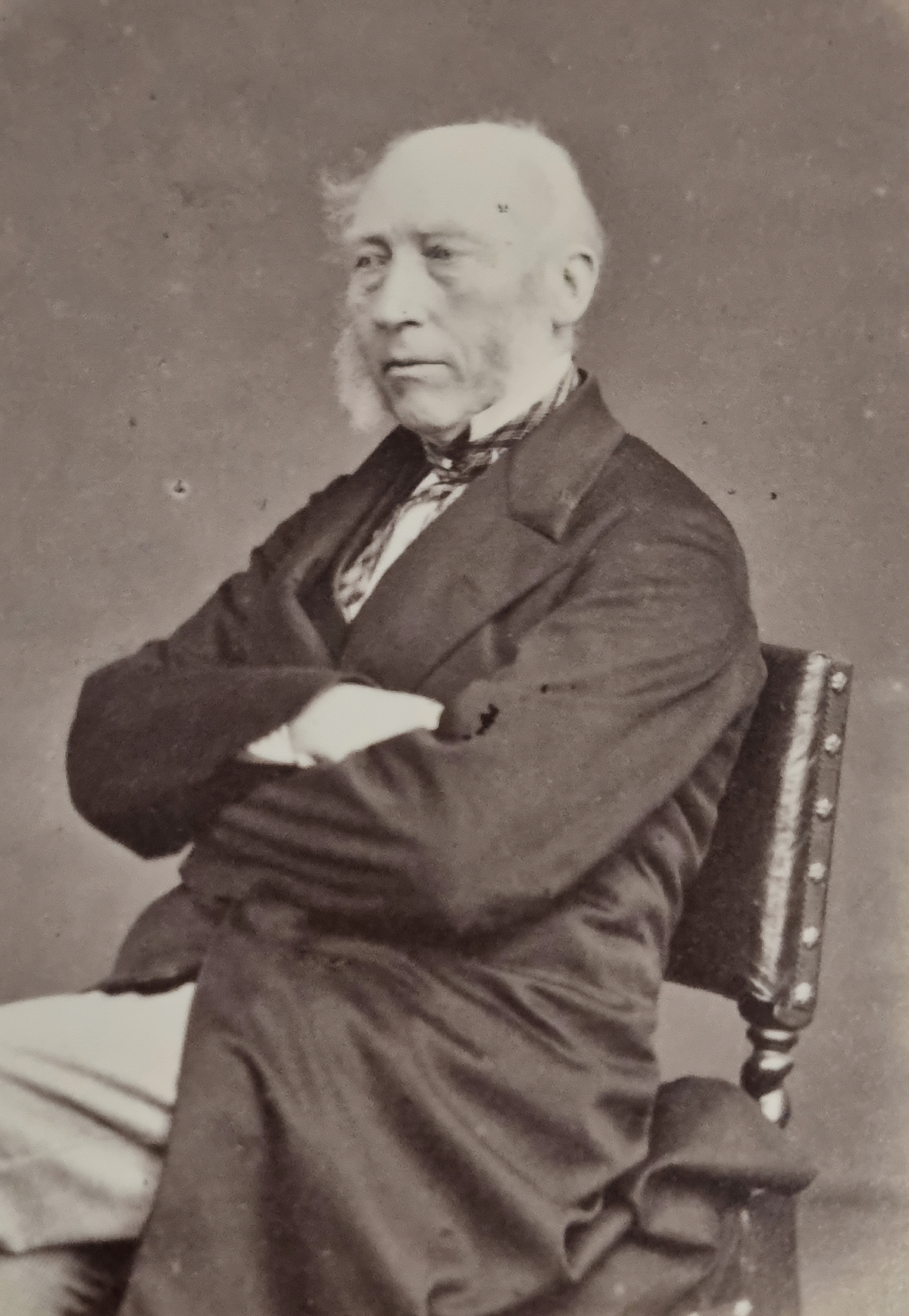
- Portrait of John Phillips, c. 1866
- Born: 25 December 1800; Marden, Wiltshire, England
- Died: 24 April 1874 (aged 73); All Souls College, England
- Known for: publishing the first global geologic time scale based on the correlation of fossils in rock strata.
- Awards: FRS (1834)
- Scientific career
- Fields: Geology
- Workplaces: Ashmolean Museum; Yorkshire Museum

John Phillips FRS (25 December 1800 – 24 April 1874) was an English geologist. In 1841 he published the first global geologic time scale based on the correlation of fossils in rock strata, thereby helping to standardize terminology including the term Mesozoic, which he invented.

== Life and work ==
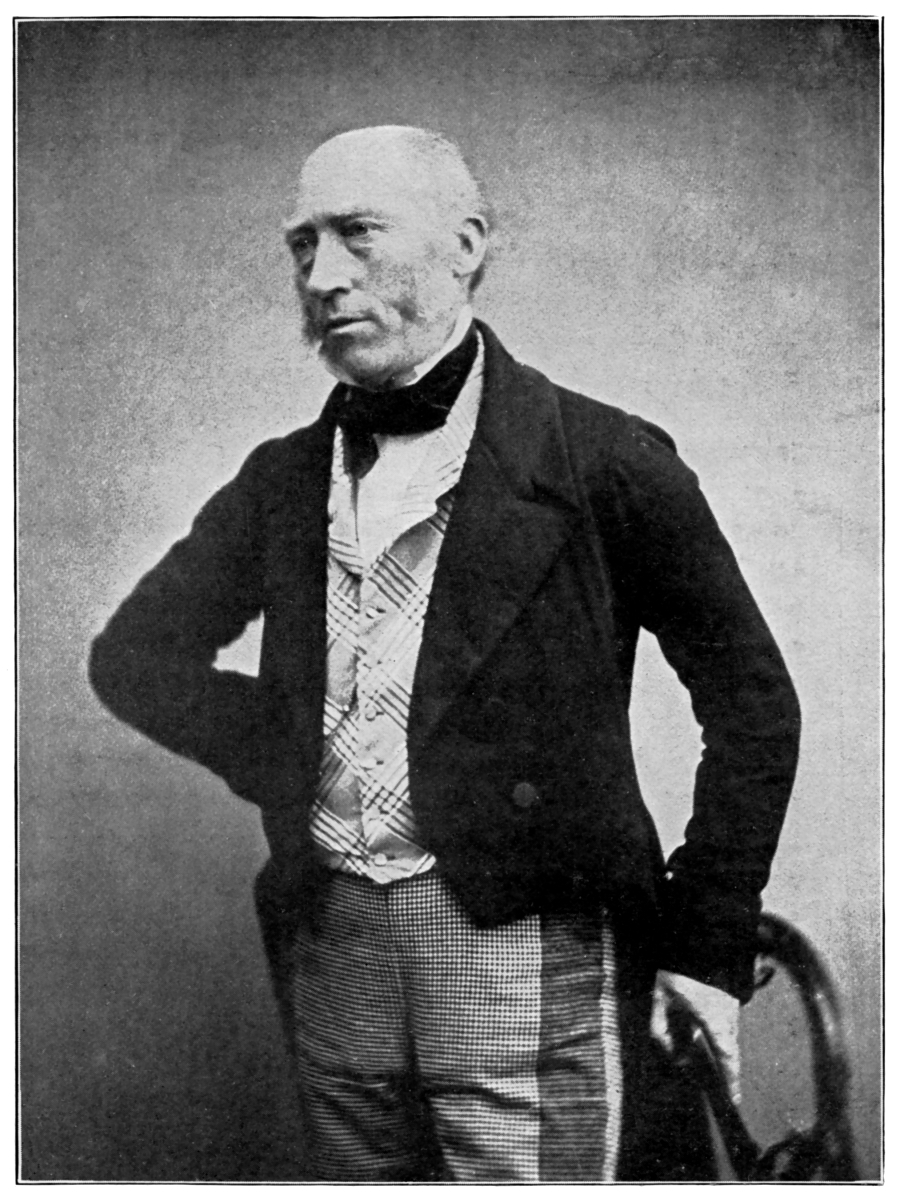
John Phillips

Phillips was born at Marden in Wiltshire. His father belonged to an old Welsh family, but settled in England as an officer of excise and married the sister of William Smith, a renowned English geologist. When both parents died when he was a child, Phillips's custody was assumed by Smith, and Phillips was brought into Smith's London home during early 1815. During the next few years, he attended various schools and helped his uncle with his geological research and writing; he also developed an interest in lithography (printing from prepared slabs of stone) and was among the earliest English practitioners of the process, experimenting with it between about 1816 and 1819. After ending school, Phillips accompanied Smith on his wanderings in connection with his preparation of geological maps.

During the spring of 1824, Smith went to York to deliver a course of lectures on geology, and his nephew Phillips accompanied him. Phillips accepted engagements in the principal Yorkshire towns to arrange their museums and give courses of lectures on the collections contained therein. York became his residence, and he obtained during 1826 the situation of keeper of the Yorkshire Museum and secretary of the Yorkshire Philosophical Society at the same time as Henry Robinson was Librarian of the YPS.

From that centre, Phillips extended his operations to towns beyond the county, and by 1831 he included University College London within the sphere of his activity. During that year the British Association for the Advancement of Science was initiated at York, and Phillips was one of the people who organized it. He became the first assistant secretary in 1832, a job which he had until 1859. In 1834, he accepted the professorship of geology at King's College London, but retained his job at York.

In 1834, Phillips was elected a fellow of the Royal Society. During later years he received honorary degrees of LL.D. from Dublin and Cambridge, and D.C.L. from Oxford; while in 1845 he was awarded the Wollaston Medal by the Geological Society of London. In 1840, he resigned his charge of the Yorkshire Museum and was appointed to the staff of the geological survey of Great Britain managed by Henry De la Beche. Phillips spent some time studying the Palaeozoic fossils of Devon, Cornwall and West Somerset, of which he published a descriptive memoir (in 1841). During that same year, he published the first global geologic time scale, which ordered rock strata according to the types of fossils found within. This helped standardize the usage of the terms Paleozoic period, which he extended to a longer period than it had had by previous usage, and Mesozoic period, the latter being his own invention. He also made a detailed survey of the region of the Malvern Hills, of which he prepared the elaborate account that appears in vol. ii. of the Memoirs of the Survey (1848). In 1844, he became professor of geology for Trinity College Dublin.

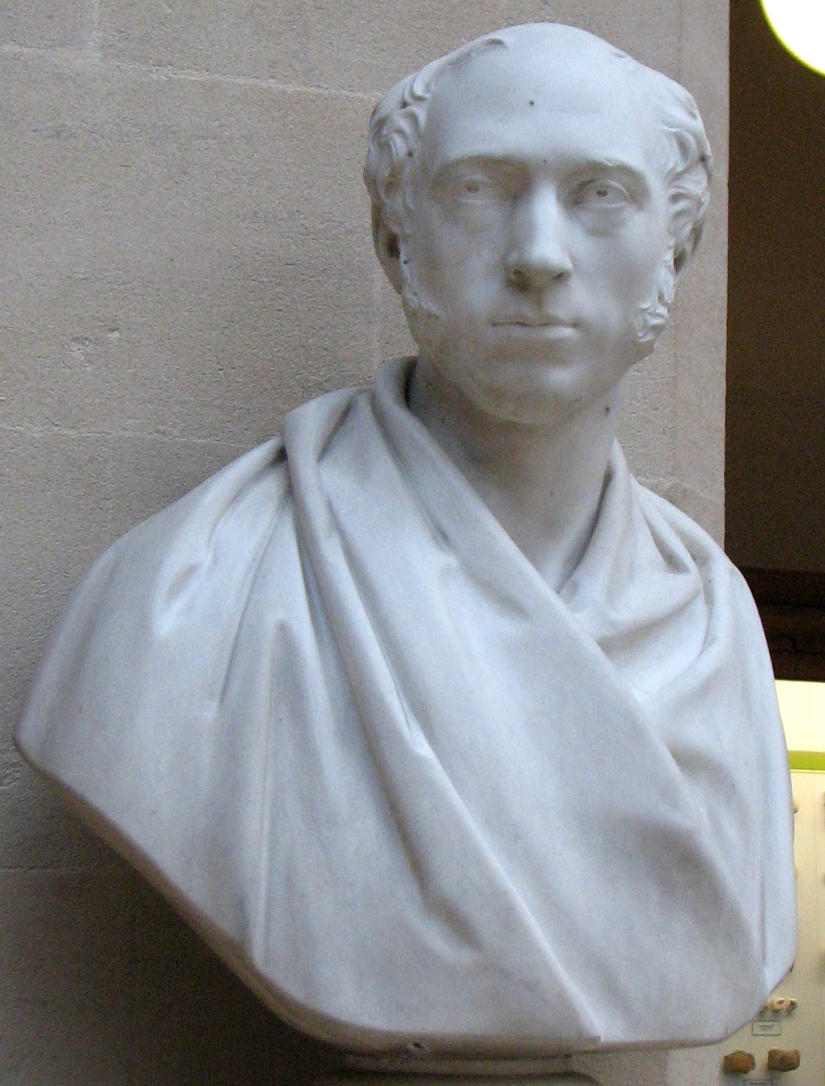
Bust of John Phillips in the Oxford University Museum

Nine years later, on the death of Hugh Edwin Strickland, who had acted as substitute for Dean Buckland in the readership of geology in the University of Oxford, Phillips succeeded to the post of deputy. At the dean's death in 1856, Phillips became himself reader, a post which he had to the time of his death. During his residence in Oxford, he had a major part in the foundation and arrangement of the University Museum established in 1859 (see his Notices of Rocks and Fossils in the University Museum, 1863; and The Oxford Museum, by H. W. Acland and J. Ruskin, 1859; reprinted with additions 1893). Phillips was also keeper of the Ashmolean Museum from 1854 until 1870. During 1859–1860 he was president of the Geological Society of London, and during 1865 president of the British Association. Phillips also made astronomical observations of the planet Mars during its 1862 opposition.

On 23 April 1874, he dined at All Souls College, but on leaving he slipped and fell down a flight of stone stairs. He died the next day, and was buried in York Cemetery beside his sister Anne. His coffin was accompanied to Oxford railway station by 200 university academics.

== Selected writings ==
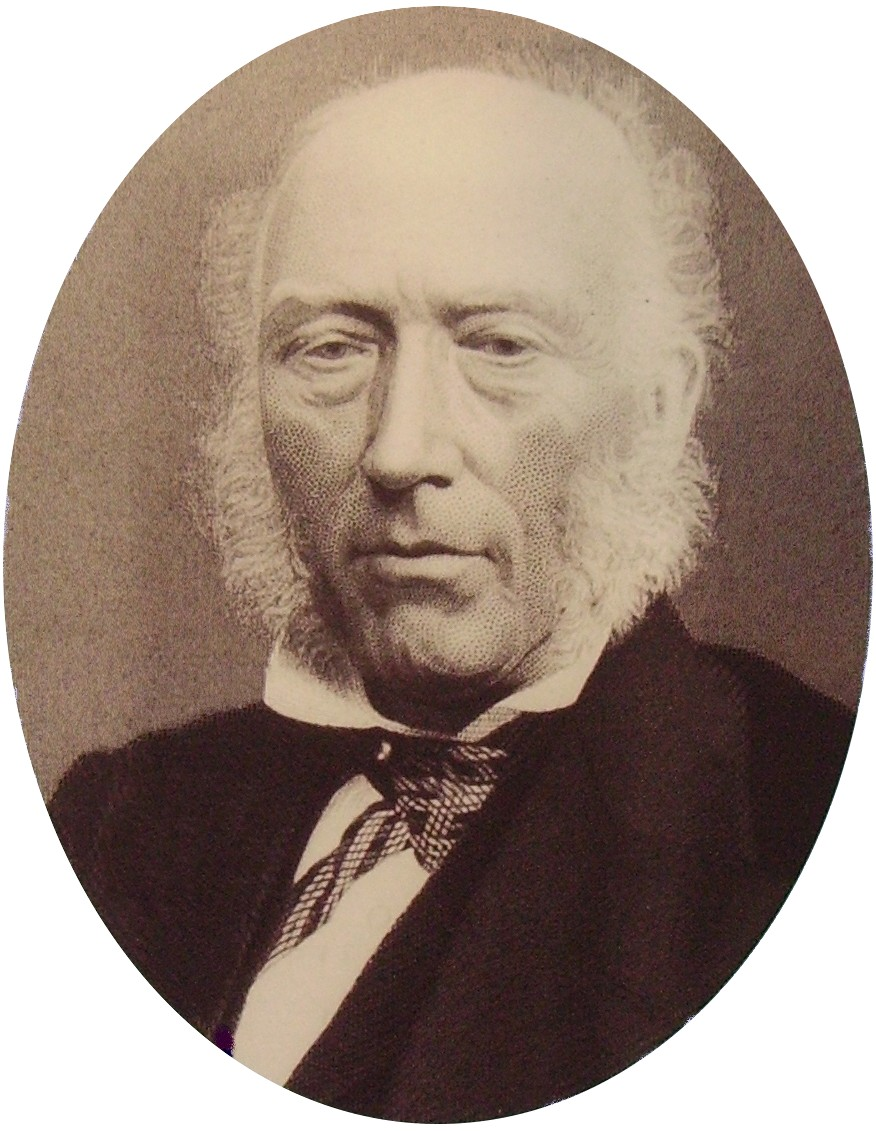
Portrait

The first paper Phillips published was On the Direction of the Diluvial Currents in Yorkshire (1827). He contributed to the Philosophical Magazine, the Journal of the Geological Society, and the Geological Magazine. He was also the author of separate works, including:

- Illustrations of the Geology of Yorkshire (in two parts, 1829 and 1836; 2nd edition of part 1 in 1835; 3rd edition, edited by R. Etheridge, in 1875) Part 1 & Part 2; Full text of the 1829 edition at Archive.org
- A Treatise on Geology (1837–1839); Vol I; Vol II
- Memoirs of William Smith (1844);
- The Rivers, Mountains and Sea-Coast of Yorkshire (1853);
- Manual of Geology, Practical and Theoretical Part I; Part II(1855);
- Life on the Earth: its Origin and Succession (1860);
- Vesuvius (1869);
- Geology of Oxford and the Valley of the Thames (1871).

To these should be added his Monograph of British Belemnitidae (1865), for the Palaeontographical Society, and his geological map of the British Isles (1847). His manuscript notebook describing his early experiments with lithography was published by the Printing Historical Society in 2016.

== Eponymy ==
The Carboniferous trilobite genus Phillipsia Portlock, 1843 is named in his honour.

Craters on Mars and the Moon are named after him.

== Blue plaque ==
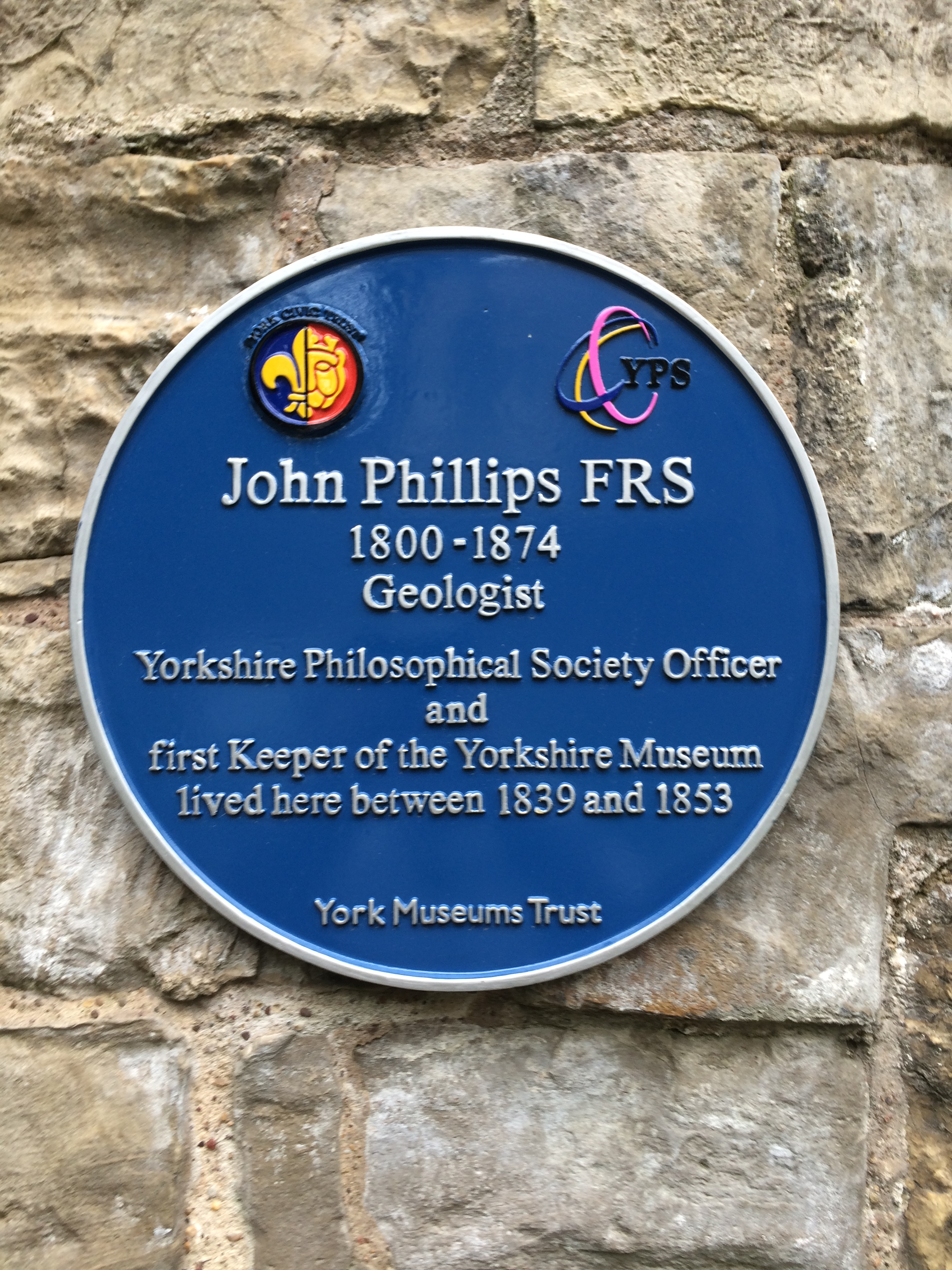
Blue plaque commemorating John Phillips in the York Museum Gardens

In February 2016, a blue plaque commemorating John Phillips was erected on the side of St. Mary's Lodge (in York Museum Gardens), where Phillips lived in the mid-19th Century. The plaque, dedicated by the Yorkshire Philosophical Society, York Civic Trust, and York Museums Trust reads: "John Phillips FRS, 1800–1874, Geologist. Yorkshire Philosophical Society Officer and first Keeper of the Yorkshire Museum lived here between 1839 and 1853."
