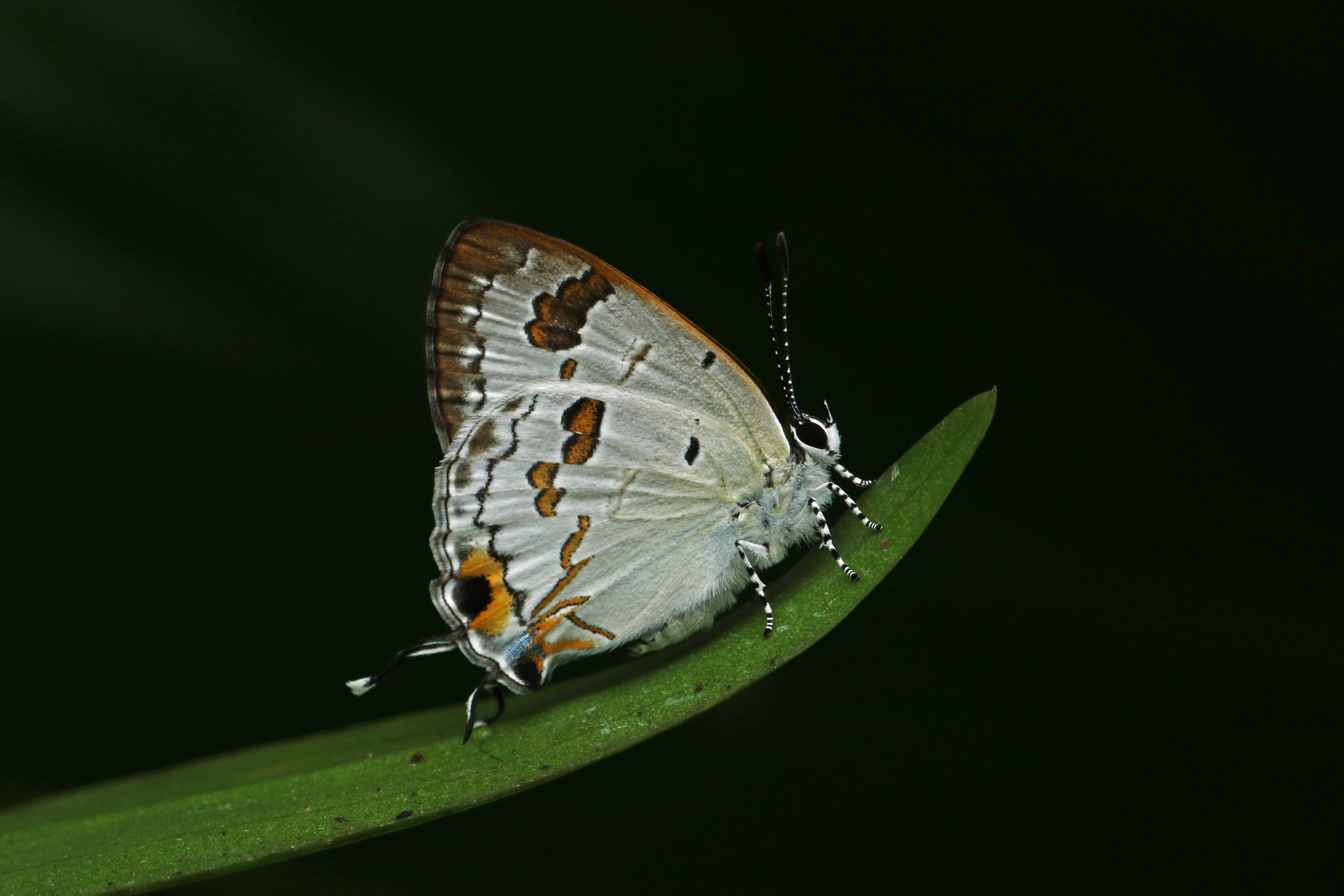

Scientific classification
- Kingdom: Animalia
- Phylum: Arthropoda
- Class: Insecta
- Order: Lepidoptera
- Family: Lycaenidae
- Genus: Chliaria
- Species: C. othona

Binomial name
- Chliaria othona (Hewitson, 1865)

Synonyms
- Chliaria eltola Hewitson, 1865; Hypolycaena othona Hewitson, 1865

= Chliaria othona =

Orchid tit

Species of butterfly

Chliaria othona, the orchid tit, is a species of lycaenid or blue butterfly found in Asia.

The orchid tit is one of the rare butterflies belonging to the family Lycaenidae (Kehimkar, 2008). This butterfly is fairly common in northern India, but was reported to be very rare in southern India. In India, Chliaria othona is distributed in the Western Ghats, Uttaranchal to Arunachal Pradesh, the northeast, West Bengal and the Andaman Islands. It was also reported from Nepal, Bhutan, Bangladesh and Myanmar. The species prefers wet forests of up to 1524 meters altitude from the mean sea level and occasionally visits damp patches for mud-puddling. The caterpillars of orchid tit feed on the flower buds and flowers of orchids, hence the name.

== Subspecies ==
The subspecies of Chliaria othona are-

- Chliaria othona othona Hewitson, 1865 – India, Myanmar, Thailand
- Chliaria othona mimima Druce, 1895 – Borneo
- Chliaria othona matiana Fruhstorfer, 1912 – Vietnam
- Chliaria othona dendrobia Roepke, 1919 – Java
- Chliaria othona semanga Corbet, 1940 – peninsular Malaya
- Chliaria othona jiwabaruana Eliot, 1980 – Mentawai Island
- Chliaria othona waltraudae (Treadaway & Nuyda, [1995])

== Description ==
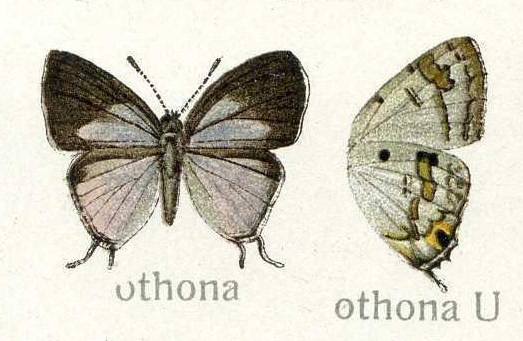
Male, upperside left, underside right

Male. Upperside dark blue. Forewing with the apical half black, its inner margin crossing the end of the cell to vein 2 near the outer margin of the wing, from thence to the hinder angle in a moderately broad band, the costal band from the upper end of the cell to the base somewhat narrower. Cilia brown. Hindwing with the costa and apex with a moderately broad black band, the rest of the wing blue, outer marginal line finely black, with an inner white line, abdominal fold whitish; tails black, with white tips, outer margin nearly evenly rounded. Cilia white, with grey tips. Underside whitish-grey, markings chocolate-brown. Forewing with a black sub-costal spot one-fourth from the base, a double line crossing the end of the cell, a rather broad shorthand from near the costa to vein 4, composed of two conjoined squarish spots, the lower the larger, the band continued hindward in a narrow straight streak ending in a point on the sub-median vein, a sub-marginal lunular line, a dark band close to the margin. Hindwing with a sub-basal spot below the costa, two pale lines close together, as in the forewing closing the cell, an irregular discal band, commencing on the costa with two conjoined, inwardly oblique dark spots, and two more somewhat similar spots, their upper inner end touching the lower outer end of the others, then two more conjoined but smaller spots, inwardly placed, their upper outer end well separated from the lower inner end of the two above them, a sub-marginal lunular line, its lower portion well separated from the outer margin of the wing, a sub-terminal series of small, pale brown lunular spots, a small, black anal spot, a large one in the first interspace, the former capped with orange, and with a short pale orange streak running up the abdominal margin, the latter with its upper portion rather broadly ringed with orange, both wings with terminal black line. Cilia white, with brown spots opposite the vein ends. Antennae black, ringed with white; head and body blackish-brown above, grey beneath.

Female. Upperside dark brownish-grey. Forewing with the marginal bands as in the male, but not so dark. Hindwing with the ground colour darker at the base, gradually paling towards the outer margin; in some examples the lower third of the

wing is quite pale, almost grey; terminal line black, with an inner white thread. Cilia grey. Underside as in the male.

— Charles Swinhoe, Lepidoptera Indica. Vol. IX

== Distribution ==
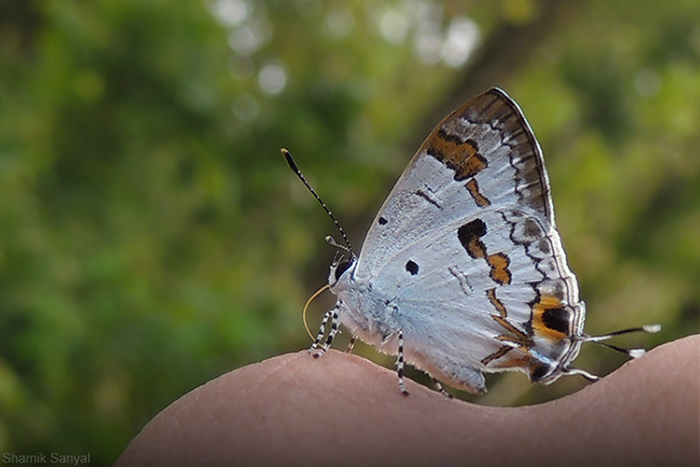
In Gorumara National Park, West Bengal

Distribution records of Chliaria othona in India

The orchid tit is found in Bangladesh, India, Myanmar, Thailand, Laos, northern Vietnam, Peninsular Malaysia, Pulau Tioman and possibly Taiwan.

In India the butterfly is found in the Western Ghats, the Himalayas from Garhwal to Assam, Bengal and onto Myanmar.

In Sikkim, the orchid tit is found up to an altitude of 5,000 feet (1,500 m).

== Status ==
The species is considered rare in southern India, but not rare in the north.

== Habits ==
The orchid tit is to be found in dense, rainy jungles. It is rarely seen except around its food plants - the flower buds of epiphytic orchids. It flies weakly and settles on flowers, leaves. It visits damp patches.

== Life cycle ==
Caterpillar - green onisciform (woodlouse-shaped) larvae with red dorsal band and three red rippled lines on each side. The caterpillar's head is concealed and its body is covered with minute bristles. Distinct short protuberances extend from the anal segment. It feeds on the flowers of the orchid.

Pupa - smooth and greenish grey, resembles those of other Lycaenidae species. It has a few white markings, with a distinctly wavy pattern on the wing covers. It is found fastened along the stem of the orchids.

Larval food plants - The orchid tit's larval host plants are from the family Orchidaceae from genera Arundina, Dendrobium, Papilionanthe, Phaius, Phalaenopsis, Spathoglottis and the specific species are Papilionanthe subulata and Spathoglottis plicata

== See also ==
- Lycaenidae
- List of butterflies of India (Lycaenidae)
