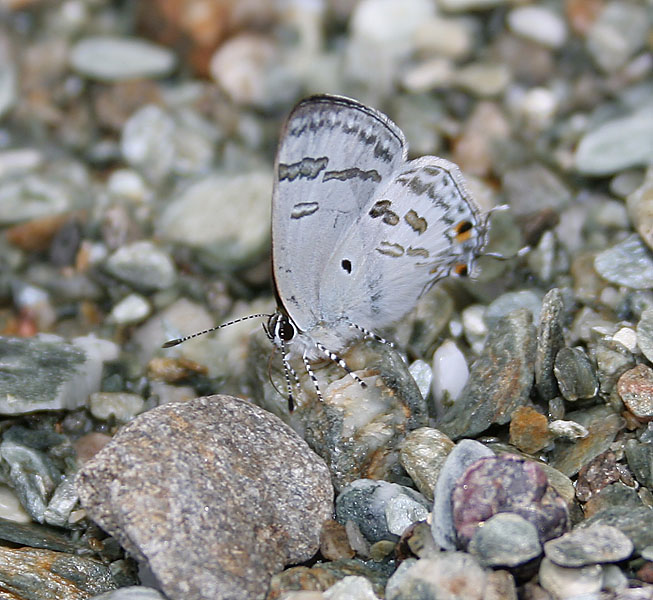
- Chliaria kina

Scientific classification
- Kingdom: Animalia
- Phylum: Arthropoda
- Clade: Pancrustacea
- Class: Insecta
- Order: Lepidoptera
- Family: Lycaenidae
- Genus: Chliaria; Moore, 1884

Species
- See text

= Chliaria =

Genus of butterflies

Chliaria is a butterfly genus in the family Lycaenidae. The species of this genus are found in the Indomalayan realm.

== Species ==
The genus includes the following species:

- Chliaria balua Moulton, 1911 Borneo (Sarawak), Sumatra, Peninsular Malaya
- Chliaria kina (Hewitson, 1869)
- Chliaria othona (Hewitson, 1865)
- Chliaria pahanga Corbet, 1938 Peninsular Malaya
- Chliaria tora (Kheil, 1884) Nias, Sumatra
