= Hewson River =

Coordinates: 43°51′S 171°04′E

Location
- Country: New Zealand

Physical characteristics
- Source
  - location: Ben McLeod Range
- Mouth
  - location: Orari River
- Length: 23 km (14 mi)

The Hewson River is a river of New Zealand's South Island. It flows east and then south from the Ben McLeod Range of inland Canterbury before flowing into the upper reaches of the Orari River 5 kilometres (3 mi) west of Mount Peel.

== See also ==
- List of rivers of New Zealand
