= Hewson–Gutting House =

Historic house in Ohio, United States

- U.S. National Register of Historic Places
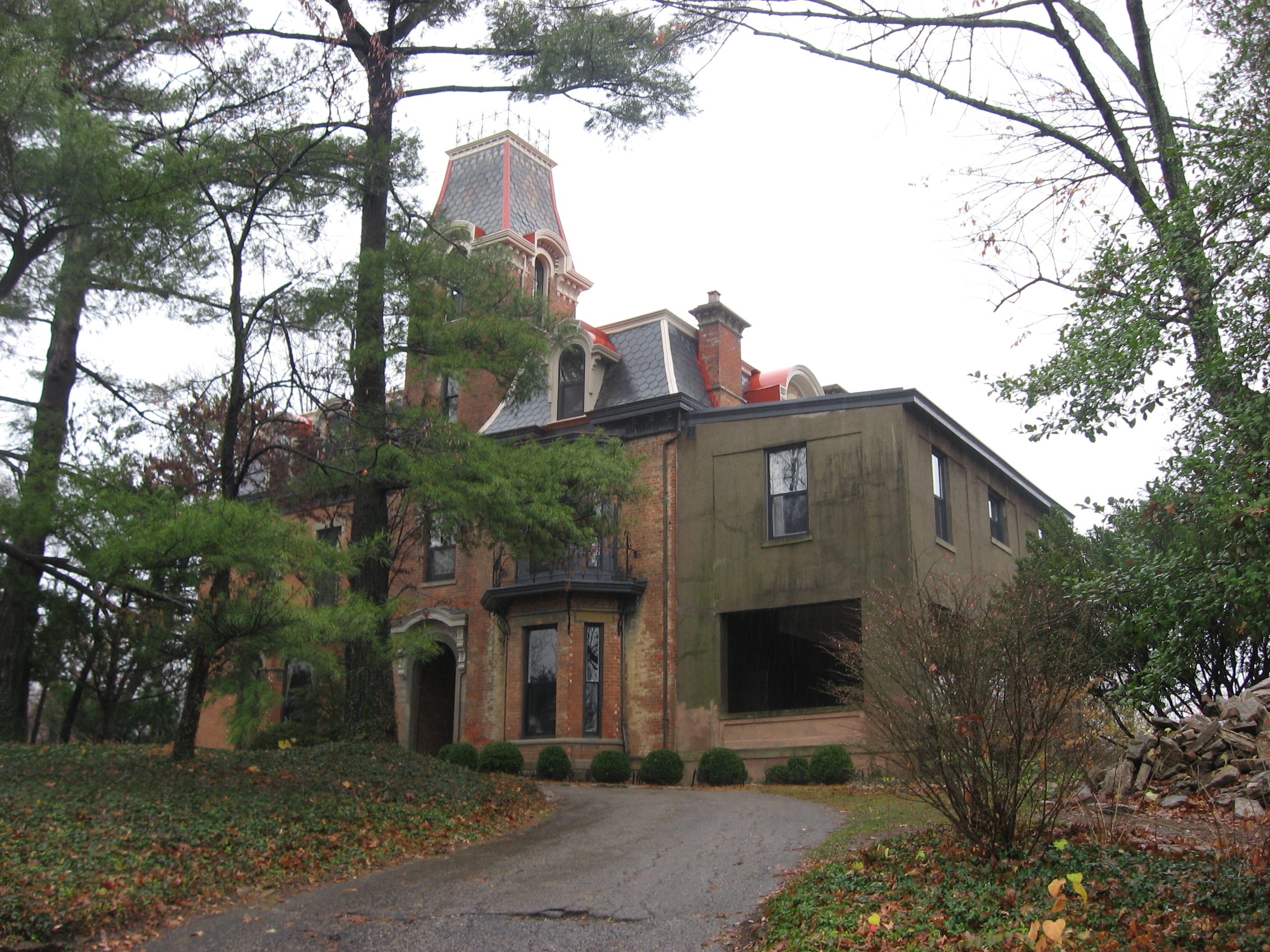
- Front of the house

- Location within Ohio Location within the United States
- Location: 515 Lafayette Avenue, Cincinnati, Ohio
- Coordinates: 39°9′16.91″N 84°31′36.11″W
- Architectural style: Second Empire
- NRHP reference No.: 79001857
- Added to NRHP: December 21, 1979

Hewson–Gutting House is a registered historic building in Cincinnati, Ohio, listed in the National Register on December 21, 1979.

== Historic uses ==
- Single Dwelling
