= Christopher Hewison =

English cricketer

Christopher Jon Hewison (born October 6, 1979) is an English cricketer. Born in Gateshead, Tyne and Wear, he was a right-handed batsman and a right-arm medium-pace bowler. He also played occasionally as a wicket-keeper. He played first-class and List A cricket for Nottinghamshire, and Durham CB during his four-year first-class career. Most recently, he has played Minor Counties Cricket for Northumberland. He now lives with his beautiful daughter Jen.
