= York Cemetery, York =

Cemetery in York, England

York Cemetery
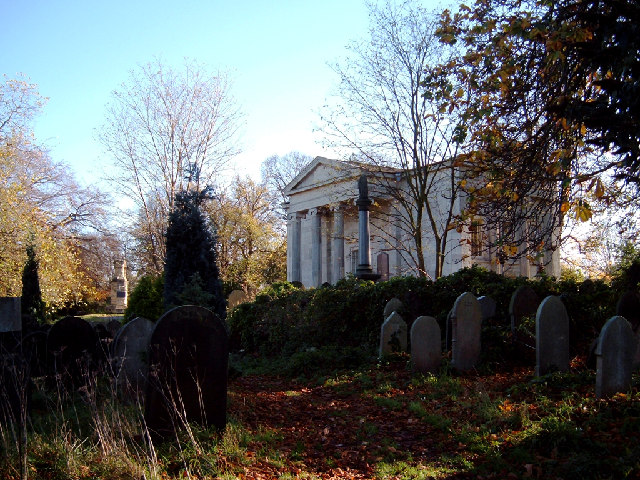
- Interactive map of York Cemetery

Details
- Established: 1837; 189 years ago
- Location: York
- Country: England
- Coordinates: 53°57′N 1°04′W
- Type: Public
- Owned by: The York Cemetery Trust
- Size: 24 acres (97,000 m^{2})
- No. of graves: 28,000+
- Find a Grave: York Cemetery

York Cemetery is a cemetery located in the city of York, England. Founded in 1837, it now encompasses 24 acres (9.7 ha) (97,000 m^{2}) and is owned and administered by The York Cemetery Trust with support of the Friends of York Cemetery. It is situated on Cemetery Road in the Fishergate area of York. It has approximately 28,000 graves and over 17,000 monuments, six of which are Grade II listed. The chapel is a Grade II* listed building, while the gatehouse, gate and railings are Grade II. The cemetery as a whole is a Grade II* listed park and garden. The architect of the buildings and designer of the grounds was James Pigott Pritchett.

== History ==
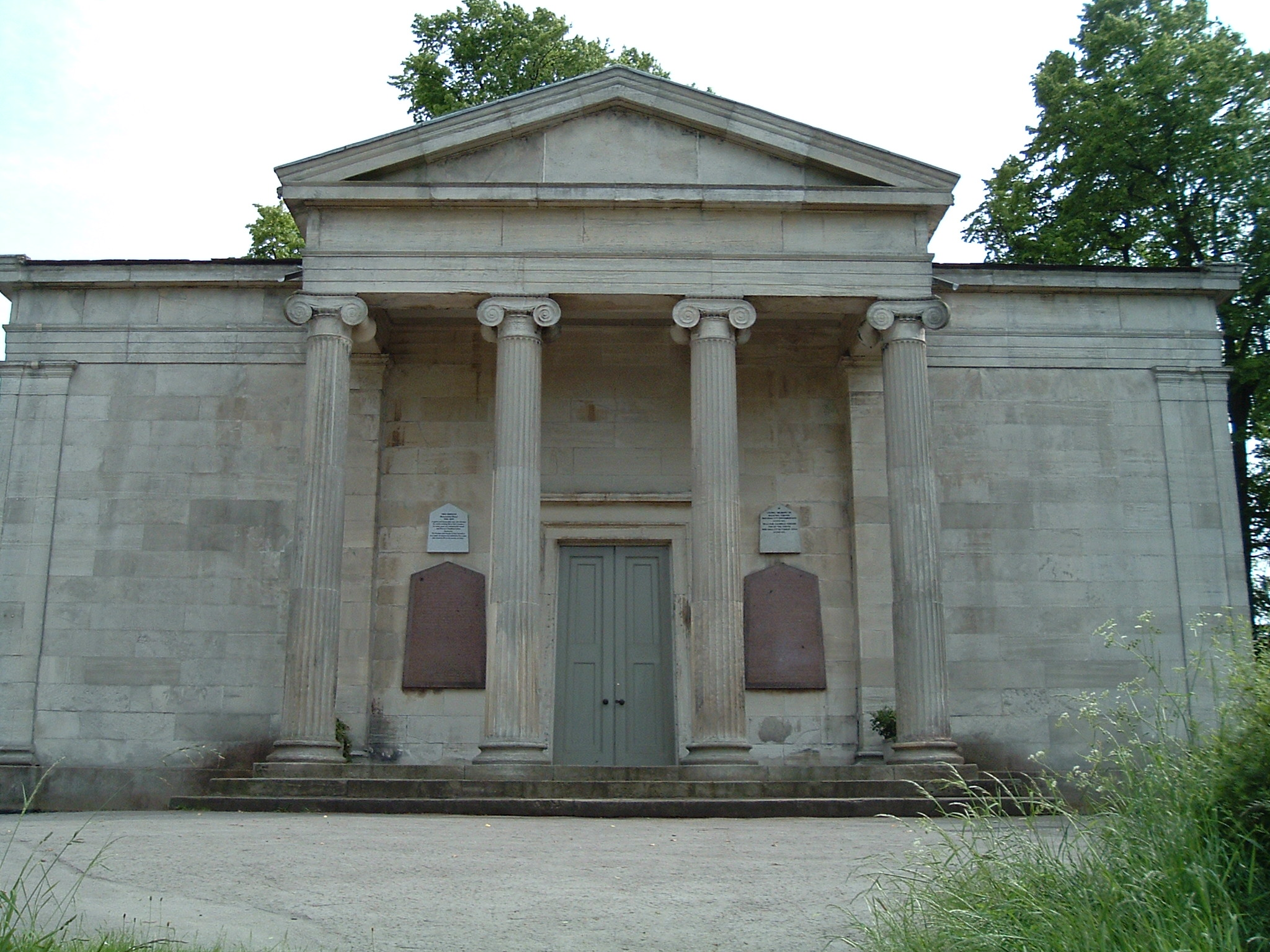
The cemetery chapel

The York Public Cemetery Company was formed in 1837 to provide better burial facilities for the citizens of York – whatever their station in life – than those offered by the overcrowded parish and non-conformist graveyards in the city. Initially, it had to compete with the existing graveyards, but, because of their unsatisfactory condition, these were all closed by an Order in Council in December 1854. From 1855 to the 1940s, the cemetery expanded to its present size of 24 acres (97,000 m^{2}) by buying all the adjacent land that was available. It prospered, and paid good dividends to its shareholders.

By the 1960s, with the cemetery nearly full, it became increasingly clear that it was no longer financially viable. The company went into voluntary liquidation in June 1966. The process was completed in 1979, by which date there was nothing of commercial value left, other than the land containing over 28,000 graves, 17,000 monuments and two listed buildings in an advanced state of disrepair. The abandoned site devolved to the Crown, and became an overgrown and derelict wilderness.

In June 1984, the roof of the chapel collapsed, bringing down part of the rear wall with it. This stimulated a group of local people to take action, which led to the formation of York Cemetery Trust, a registered charity. In February 1987, the Crown Commissioners sold the freehold of the cemetery to the Trust for a nominal sum, giving the Trust responsibility for continuing the burial business, using the site for educational purposes, and restoring the chapel and gatehouse.

A small staff of permanent employees, assisted by volunteers, now help maintain and develop the site as a heritage and environmental asset, while also allowing it to continue its original purpose as a burial place.

== Notable interments ==
- Thomas Cooke (1807–1868), optical instrument manufacturer
- John Phillips (1800–1874), geologist
- John Kenrick (1788–1877), classical historian
- William Hewson (1806–1870), theological writer
- James Pigott Pritchett (1789–1868), architect
- Joseph Terry (1828–1898), confectioner
- John Petty (1807–1868), Primitive Methodist minister
- Thomas Wilkinson (1831–1887), Royal Marines Crimean War recipient of the Victoria Cross

The cemetery contains the graves of 236 Commonwealth service personnel from both world wars.

== See also ==
- Grade II* listed buildings in the City of York
- Listed buildings in York (outside the city walls, southern part)
