= Henry Hewson =

English rugby league footballer

Playing information
- Position: Second-row
Club
Years	Team	Pld	T	G	FG	P
1921–24	Wakefield Trinity	39	0	1	0	2

Henry Hewson was a professional rugby league footballer who played in the 1920s. He played at club level for Wakefield Trinity, as a second-row.

== Playing career ==
Hewson made his début for Wakefield Trinity during January 1921.
