= Kevin Hewison =

Australian social and political scientist (born 1954)

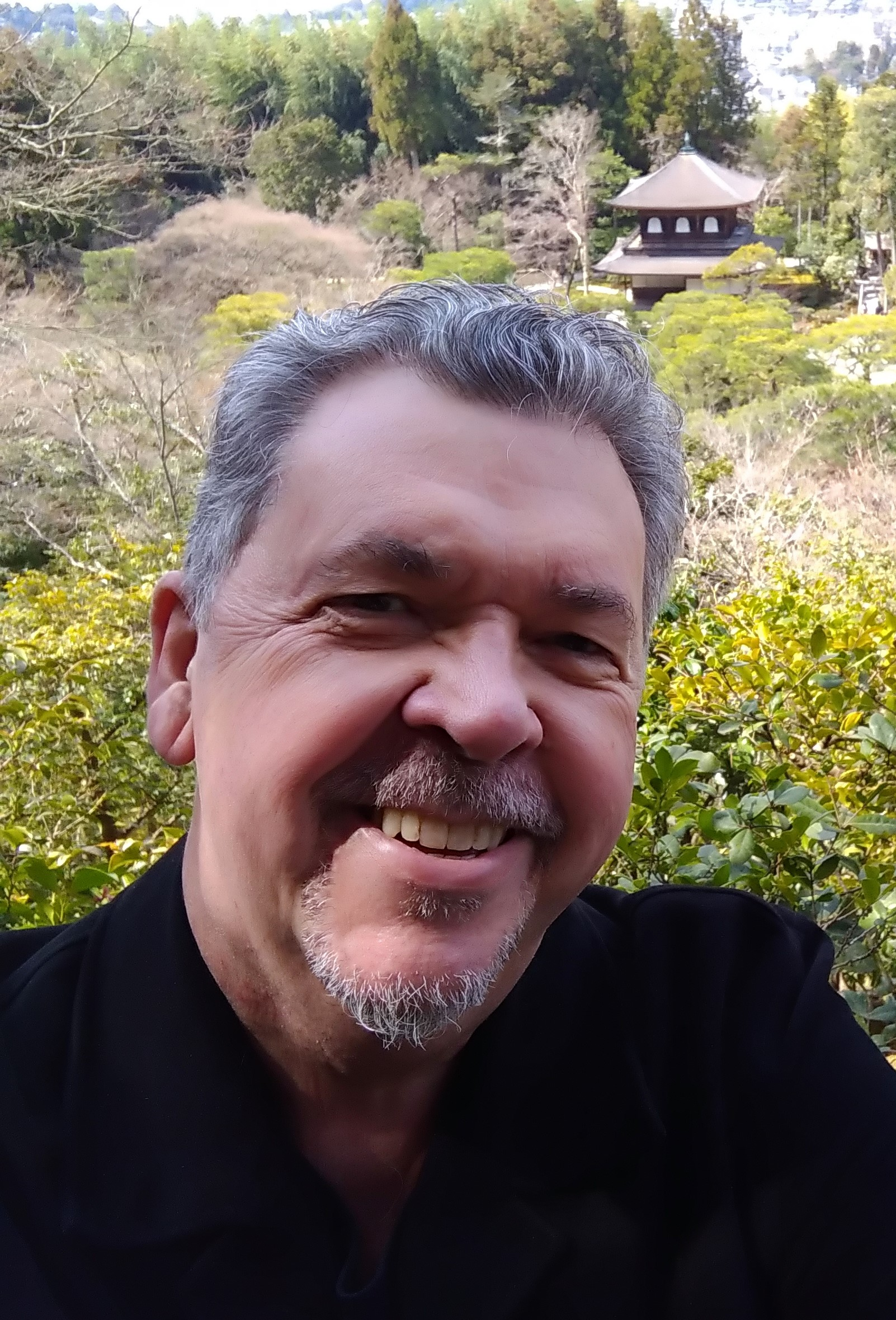
- Born: 15 May 1954 (age 72); Collie, Australia
- Education: Western Australian Institute of Technology (BA/DipEd); Murdoch University (BAHons/PhD)

Kevin Hewison FASSA is an Australian social and political scientist, formerly the Weldon E. Thornton Distinguished Professor at University of North Carolina at Chapel Hill (UNC) and director of the Carolina Asia Center. He is now Weldon E. Thornton Distinguished Emeritus Professor at UNC.

Born on 15 May 1954, in Collie, Western Australia, he grew up in Perth, attending Doubleview Primary School (1960–1964), Scotch College (1965–1966) and Churchlands Senior High School (1967–1971). He completed undergraduate studies in social science at Perth's Western Australian Institute of Technology (now Curtin University, 1972–1974), where he also completed a Graduate Diploma in Education (1975). While teaching high school in Perth's suburbs, he obtained a First Class Honours degree in Southeast Asian Studies at Murdoch University in 1978. He went on to finish his Ph.D. in 1984 at Murdoch University, supervised by Richard Robison.

In his academic career, Hewison has held academic posts at Murdoch University in Australia (1983–84, 1991–1994, 2013–2015), Australian National University (1985–86), University of Papua New Guinea (1984), University of New England (UNE, 1994–2000) and the City University of Hong Kong (2000–2004) in various social science and area studies disciplines. In late 1986, Hewison joined the Thai-Australia Northeast Village Water Resources Project based in Khon Kaen as a consultant sociologist and worked with the project until late 1989. He was the team leader on the UNICEF Laos rural sanitation and water supply masterplan (1991), and also worked as an advisor on social and community issues for the Australian Agency for International Development in 1996–98, while on leave from UNE.

At UNE, Hewison was the Foundation Chair of Asian Studies and chair of the Department of Asian Languages and Societies. In late 2000, he relocated to Hong Kong to become professor and director of City University's Southeast Asia Research Centre. In January 2005, Hewison joined UNC-Chapel Hill as professor of Asian studies and director of the Carolina Asia Center and became Weldon E. Thornton Distinguished Professor in 2012. He retired from UNC-Chapel Hill in mid 2013 to become the Sir Walter Murdoch Professor of Politics and International Studies and director of the Asia Research Centre at Murdoch University, retiring in 2015.

Hewison has also held visiting positions at several universities. In 1989–90, he was a visiting professor at Mahidol University (Thailand) and has twice been a visiting professor at the University of Warwick (UK), in 2000 and 2010. In the first half of 2012, he was visiting professor of Asian studies at the Singapore Management University and in December 2015 and February–March 2016, Hewison was Academic Icon (visiting professor) with the Institute of China Studies, University of Malaya. In 2017, he spent January to July as a visiting research scholar at the Center for Southeast Asian Studies at Kyoto University. In May 2018, he was visiting guest professor with the department of political science and Forum for Asian Studies at Stockholm University.

In 2014, he was elected a Fellow of the Academy of Social Sciences in Australia. He is editor-in-chief of Journal of Contemporary Asia

Known primarily for his work on Thailand's political economy and on various aspects of labour and precarious work in Asia, he has authored or edited some 250 books, articles, chapters, and media contributions.

== Books ==
- Bankers and Bureaucrats: Capital and State in Thailand, New Haven: Yale Center for International and Area Studies, Yale University Southeast Asian Monographs, No. 34, 1989.
- Power and Politics in Thailand: Essays in Political Economy, Manila and Wollongong: Journal of Contemporary Asia Publishers, 1989.
- Village Life: Culture and Transition in Thailand's Northeast, Bangkok: White Lotus, 2001 (with Seri Phongphit).
- Precarious Asia. Global Capitalism and Work in Japan, South Korea, and Indonesia, Stanford: Stanford University Press, 2022 (with Arne Kalleberg and Kwang-Yeong Shin).
- Class, Economy, and Politics in Southeast Asia. Quezon City: University of the Philippines Center for Integrative and Development Studies, 2024 (with Jim Glassman).

== Edited books ==
- Southeast Asia in the 1980s: The Politics of Economic Crisis, Sydney & London: Allen & Unwin, and Boston, Hyman Allen, 1987 (ed. with R. Robison & R. Higgott).
- Southeast Asia in the 1990s: Authoritarianism, Democracy and Capitalism, Sydney: Allen & Unwin, 1993 (ed. with R. Robison & G. Rodan).
- The Political Economy of South-East Asia. An Introduction, Melbourne: Oxford University Press, 1997 (ed. with G. Rodan & R. Robison).
- Political Change in Thailand. Democracy and Participation, London and New York: Routledge, 1997.
- The Political Economy of South-East Asia. Conflicts, Crises, and Change, Melbourne: Oxford University Press, 2001 (ed. with G. Rodan & R. Robison).
- Transnational Migration and Work in Asia, London & New York: RoutledgeCurzon, 2006 (ed. with K. Young).
- Neoliberalism and Conflict in Asia After 9/11, London & New York: Routledge, 2006 (ed. with G. Rodan).
- The Political Economy of South-East Asia. Markets, Power and Contestation, Melbourne: Oxford University Press, 2006 (ed. with G. Rodan & R. Robison).
- East Asia and the Trials of Neo-Liberalism, London & New York: Routledge, 2006 (ed. with R. Robison).
- Policy Responses to Precarious Work in Asia, Taipei: Institute of Sociology, Academia Sinica, 2015 (ed. with M. H-H. Hsiao & A. Kalleberg).
- Military, Monarchy and Repression: Assessing Thailand's Authoritarian Turn, Abingdon: Routledge, 2017 (ed. with Veerayooth Kanchoochat).
