= William Hewson (theological writer) =

William Hewson (1806–1870) was a theological writer and curate in the Church of England during the Victorian age.

== Life ==
Hewson, son of William Hewson of 7 Tottenham Court New Road, clerk in a bank, was born on 12 April 1806; baptised at St. Margaret's, Westminster, on 28 December in the same year; and entered at St. Paul's School, London, on 9 October 1815. He won an exhibition and proceeded to St. John's College, Cambridge, in 1826, where he graduated B.A. in 1830 and M.A. in 1833.

He held the curacy of Bishop Burton in the East Riding of Yorkshire from June 1830 to 1833. He was curate of Spofforth, Yorkshire, for one year from January 1834, and then became head-master of Sherburn Grammar School, Yorkshire, with Sunday duty as a curate in Sherburn parish. From January 1838 until June 1847 he was head-master of St Peter's School, York. In 1848, the Archbishop of York presented him to the perpetual curacy of Goathland, worth only £53 a year, with permission to reside at Whitby, as there was no house for the incumbent in the parish. Hewson succeeded in obtaining an increased stipend of £275 a year. He began to build a house, which was nearly completed at the time of his death. Prophecy and its fulfilment were the principal subject of his studies. He was a laborious writer, and produced twenty-six publications, but his method of exposition was not lucid, and his works were little read. His favourite belief was that the Book of Revelation is an inspired interpretation of the spirit of Jewish prophecy.

He died from disease of the heart at 1 St. Hilda Terrace, Whitby, on 23 April 1870, and was buried, as had been his wife and son, in York Cemetery.

On 2 November 1830 he had married, at St Luke's Church, Chelsea, Mary Ann, only child of Samuel and Mary Reckster, and widow of Lieutenant Alfred A. Yeakell. She died on 14 February 1861, having had two children, Frances Anne Hewson, who was born at Beverley on 8 November 1833, and completed the publication of her father's Hebrew and Greek scriptures in 1870; and John Singleton (1835–1850).

== Works ==
Some of William Hewson's publications were:

1. The Christian's Bible Companion, 1855.
2. The Key of David, or the Mystery of the Seven Sealed Books of Jewish Prophecy, 1855.
3. The Oblation and Temple of Ezekiel's Prophetic Visions, in their Relation to the Restoration of the Kingdom of Israel. To which is appended a Practical Exposition of the Apocalypse. The Symbolic Chronometer. On the Mystic Number 666, 1858, 5 parts.
4. Thy Kingdom come, or the Christian's Prayer of Penitence and Faith, 1859.
5. Christianity in its Relation to Judaism and Heathenism, in three tracts. With Lithographic Illustrations and Revolving Diagrams, 1860.
6. The Hebrew and Greek Scriptures compared with Oriental History, Dialling, Science, and Mythology. Also the History of the Cross gathered from many Countries, 1870.
