= Hewitson =

- Pronunciation: Hew-it-son

Origin
- Meaning: "son of Hewitt"
- Region of origin: Normandy, England

Hewitson is an English family name. The name comes from the patronym of the given name Hewitt, meaning "son of Hewitt". It derived from the Old French aristocratic and saint's name Hughe, Hugh brought to England by Normans. Such patronymic surnames were formed by using the ending -son to the genitive form of the father's name to indicate "son of".

Notable people with the surname include:

- Bob Hewitson (1884–1957), footballer
- Bobby Hewitson (1892–1969), first curator of the Hockey Hall of Fame in Toronto, Canada
- Iain Hewitson (born 1948), New Zealand-born chef who moved to Australia
- James Hewitson (1892–1963), English recipient of the Victoria Cross
- Laura Hewitson, British-born primate researcher noted for her work in the fields of reproductive biology and behaviour
- Mark Hewitson (1897–1973), British trade union official and Labour Party politician
- William Chapman Hewitson (1806–1878), British naturalist

== See also ==
- Hewitson River, short river in Thunder Bay District, northwestern Ontario, Canada
- Hewitson's Small Tree-nymph (Ideopsis hewitsonii), species of nymphalid butterfly in the Danainae subfamily
