= Chaipattana Foundation =

Thai non-governmental organization

- มูลนิธิชัยพัฒนา
- Formation: June 14, 1988; 37 years ago
- Founder: King Bhumibol Adulyadej
- Type: Charity organization
- Registration no.: 3975
- Headquarters: Royal Development Projects Office Building (Rama VIII Bridge) 2012, Soi Arun Amarin 36, Arun Amarin Road Bang Yikhan Sub-district, Bang Phlat District, Bangkok, 10700
- Secretary-General: Sumet Tantivejkul
- Key people: H.R.H Princess Maha Chakri Sirindhorn (Honorary President & Executive Chairperson)
- Website: Official website

The Chaipattana Foundation is a non-government organization founded by King Bhumibol operating in Thailand since 1988, that develops projects of national and social benefit to the Thai people. The Foundation's aim is to provide prompt, timely, and necessary responses to problems affecting the people of Thailand. "Chaipattana" means Victory of Development.

== Operations ==
The foundation is not subject to the budgetary constraints or regulatory requirements of government agencies. The Foundation is officially registered as a legal entity at the Ministry of the Interior. All committee members have the freedom to consider and initiate work activities.

== Projects ==
=== Agricultural development ===
"Cultivation is regarded as a highly important occupation for it produces essentials of life. Without cultivation, we would not have raw materials for food and garments or any construction work. Hence, we have to conduct agriculture."

— King Bhumibol Adulyadej, May 11, 1978

The foundation supports projects in:

- Soil Solutions and Development
- The New Theory
- Integrated Farming

=== Environmental quality ===
The foundation supports research on Vetiver, which is useful for habitat restoration and flood management.

=== Sustainable management of natural resources ===
The group supports various sustainability projects:

- Royally-Initiated Arboretum Project and Community Park
- Mangrove Biodiversity Research and Study Project
