= British Iron Age =

Period of British prehistory, from c. 800 BC until the Roman occupation

Iron Age Britain
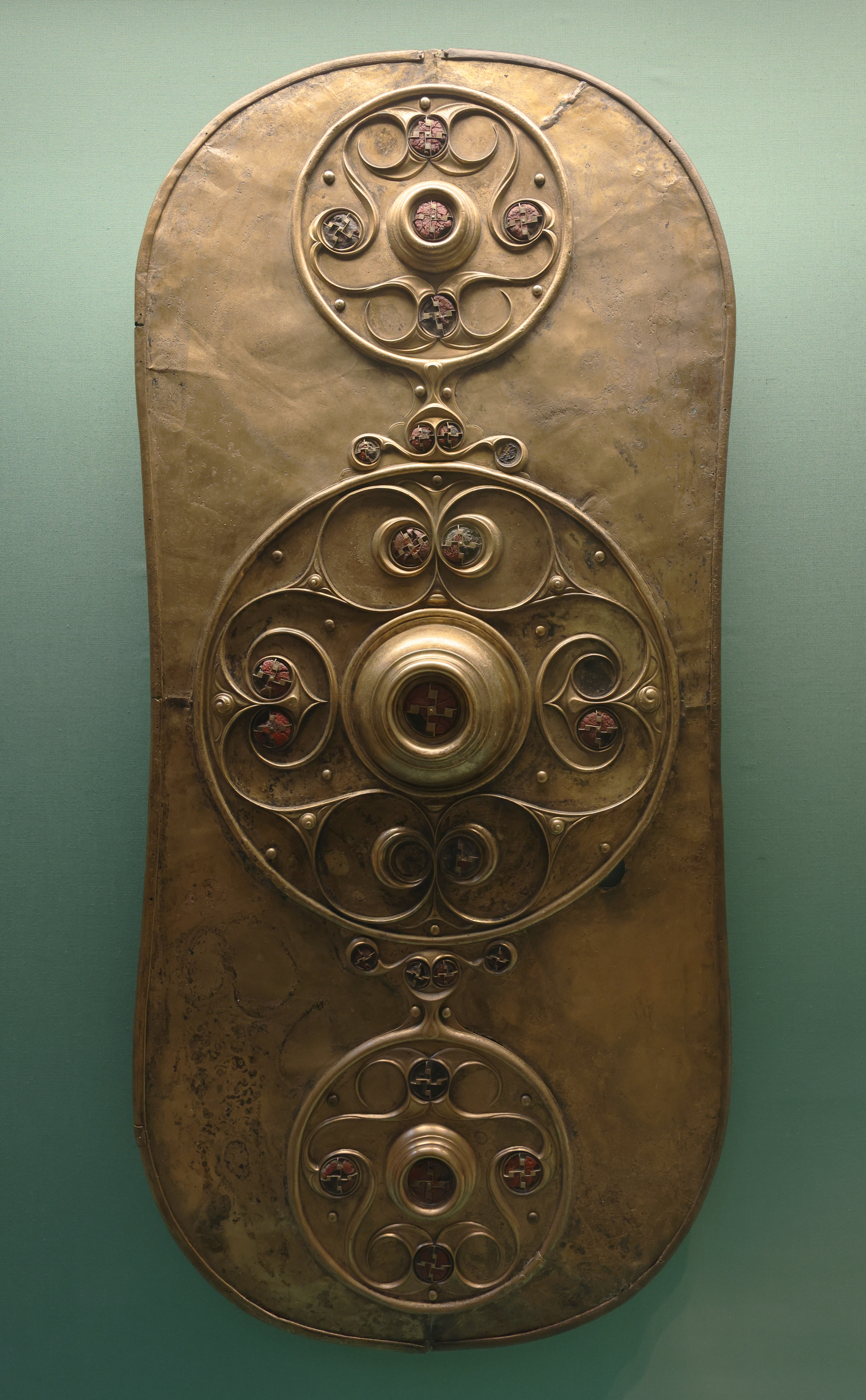
- The Battersea Shield, 4th–1st centuries BC
- Geographical range: Great Britain
- Period: Iron Age
- Dates: c. 800 BC—43 AD
- Preceded by: Bronze Age Britain, Atlantic Bronze Age
- Followed by: Roman Britain

The Iron Age in Great Britain spanned from c. 800 BC until the Roman period in the 1st century AD. It followed the British Bronze Age and was marked by the use of iron for tools and weapons. The Iron Age saw the adoption of some elements of the Hallstatt and La Tène material cultures from mainland Europe, a marked increase in the building of hillforts, and the emergence of brochs in Iron Age Scotland. The British Iron Age excludes prehistoric Ireland, which had its own Iron Age cultures.

The protohistory of Britain begins during the late Iron Age. The earliest known account was by Greek geographer Pytheas, (c. 320 BC), who refers to the island as Albion, one of the Pretannikai nesoi (Pretannic isles), and describes its inhabitants as Keltoi (Celts). Most of the Iron Age inhabitants of Britain were Insular Celts and are referred to as Celtic Britons, as they spoke Celtic languages and had broadly Celtic cultural traits. The Britons, speakers of Common Brittonic, were made up of many tribes and kingdoms, and followed an ancient Celtic religion overseen by druids. Some of the southern tribes had links with Gaul and Belgica, and minted coins. There was also some Gallic and Belgic settlement in Britain. The Iron Age ended in most of Britain with the Roman conquest which began in 43 AD.

== Etymology ==
Claudius Ptolemy described Britain at the beginning of Roman rule but incorporated material from earlier sources. Although the name "Pretanic Isles" had been known since the voyage of Pytheas, and "Britannia" was in use by Strabo and Pliny, Ptolemy used the earlier "Albion", which is known to have been used as early as the Massaliote Periplus.

The Iron Age appellation refers to the development of the technology of Ferrous metallurgy in Britain.

== Periodisation ==
Over 100 large-scale excavations of Iron Age sites had taken place before 2005, dating from the 8th century BC to the 1st century AD and overlapping into the Bronze Age in the 8th century BC. Hundreds of radiocarbon dates have been acquired and have been calibrated on four different curves, the most precise being based on tree ring sequences.

The following scheme summarises a comparative chart presented in a 2005 book by Cunliffe. British artefacts were much later in adopting Continental styles such as the La Tène style of Celtic art.

Period	Dates	Continental parallels
Earliest Iron Age	800–600 BC	Hallstatt C
Early Iron Age	600–400 BC	Hallstatt D and half of La Tène I
Middle Iron Age	400–100 BC	The rest of La Tène I, all of II and half of III
Late Iron Age	100–50 BC	The rest of La Tène III
Latest Iron Age	50 BC – AD 100	–

The Iron Age has been further subdivided with the "Late Iron Age" in Britain showing developments of new types of pottery, possibly influenced by Roman or Gaulish cultures. The clearing of forests for cultivation of agricultural crops intensified and areas with heavier and damper soil were settled. Spelt (Triticum spelta) was planted in these areas like the Tees Lowlands and some parts of Northern England.

The end of the Iron Age extends into the very early Roman Empire under the theory that Romanisation required some time to take effect. In parts of Britain that were not Romanised, such as Scotland, the period is extended a little longer, say to the 5th century. Roman geographers like Ptolemy, Pliny and Strabo knew about the island.

== Archaeological evidence ==
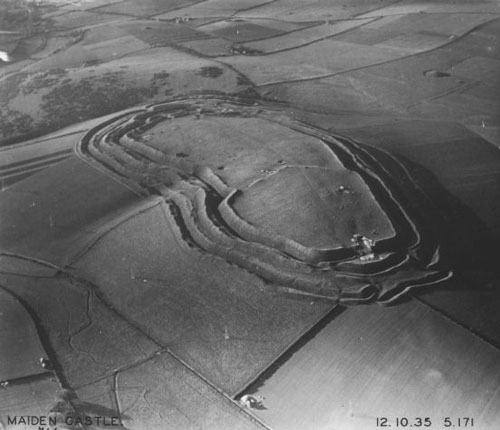
Maiden Castle, Dorset, is one of the largest hill forts in Europe.

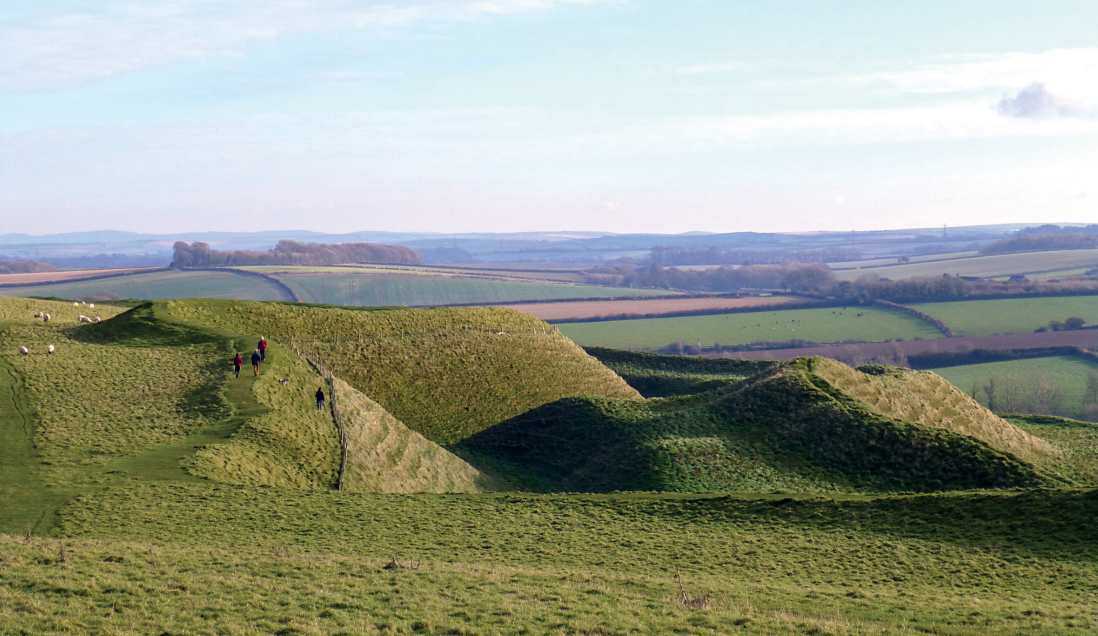
Remains of ramparts at Maiden Castle hillfort

Attempts to understand the human behaviour of the period have traditionally focused on the geographic position of the islands and their landscape, along with the channels of influence coming from Continental Europe. Room 50 at the British Museum contains many of the best exhibits and is the source for the currently accepted interpretations of this period.

During the later Bronze Age, there are indications of new ideas influencing land use and settlement. Extensive field systems, now called Celtic fields, were being set out, and settlements were becoming more permanent and focused on better exploitation of the land. The central organisation to undertake that had been present since the Neolithic period but became targeted at economic and social goals, such as taming the landscape, rather than the building of large ceremonial structures like Stonehenge. Long ditches, some many miles in length, were dug with enclosures placed at their ends. Those are thought to indicate territorial borders and a desire to increase control over wide areas.

By the 8th century BC, there is increasing evidence of Great Britain becoming closely tied to Continental Europe, especially in Southern and Eastern Britain. New weapon types appeared with clear parallels to those on the Continent, such as the Carp's tongue sword, complex examples of which are found all over Atlantic Europe. Phoenician traders probably began visiting Great Britain in search of minerals around this time and brought with them goods from the Mediterranean. At the same time, Northern European artefact types reached Eastern Great Britain in large quantities from across the North Sea.

Defensive structures dating from this time are often impressive such as the brochs of Northern Scotland and the hill forts that dotted the rest of the islands. Some of the most well-known hill forts include Maiden Castle, Dorset; Cadbury Castle, Somerset; and Danebury, Hampshire. Hill forts first appeared in Wessex in the Late Bronze Age but became common only in the period between 550 and 400 BC. The earliest were of a simple univallate form and often connected with earlier enclosures attached to the long ditch systems. Few hill forts have been substantially excavated in the modern era, Danebury being a notable exception, with 49% of its total surface area studied. However, it appears that the "forts" were also used for domestic purposes, with examples of food storage, industry and occupation being found within their earthworks. On the other hand, they may have been occupied only intermittently, as it is difficult to reconcile permanently-occupied hill forts with the lowland farmsteads and their roundhouses found during the 20th century, such as at Little Woodbury and Rispain Camp. Many hill forts are not in fact "forts" at all and demonstrate little or no evidence of occupation.

The development of hill forts may have occurred from greater tensions that arose between the better-structured and more populous social groups. Alternatively, there are suggestions that in the latter phases of the Iron Age, the structures simply indicate a greater accumulation of wealth and a higher standard of living although any such shift is invisible in the archaeological record for the Middle Iron Age, when hill forts come into their own. In that regard, they may have served as wider centres used for markets and social contact. Either way, during the Roman occupation the evidence suggests that as defensive structures, they proved to be of little use against concerted Roman attack. Suetonius comments that Vespasian captured more than 20 "towns" during a campaign in the West Country in 43 AD, and there is some evidence of violence from the hill forts of Hod Hill and Maiden Castle in Dorset from this period. Some hill forts continued as settlements for the newly-conquered Britons. Some were also reused by later cultures, such as the Saxons in the early medieval period.

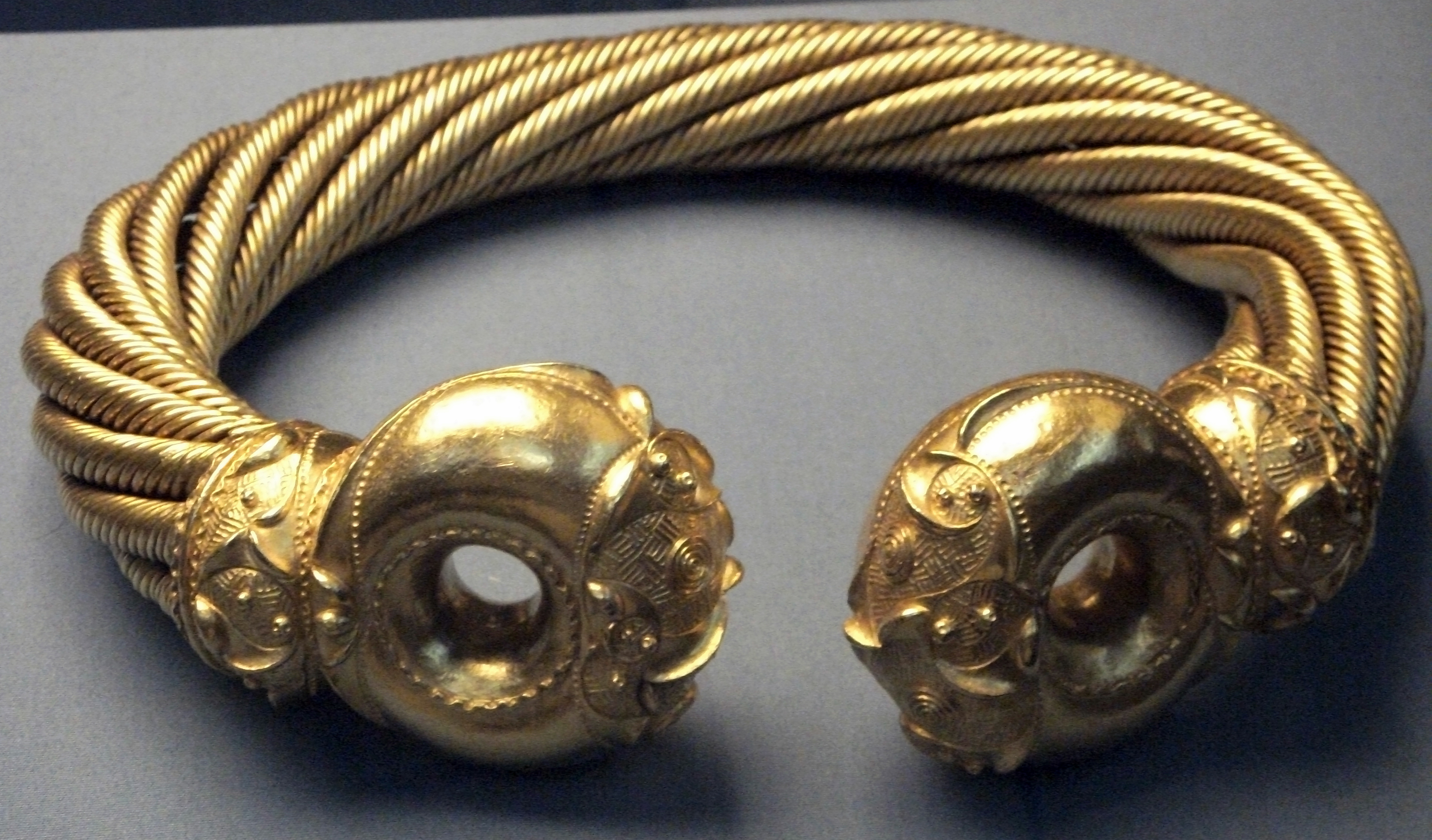
The Snettisham Torc

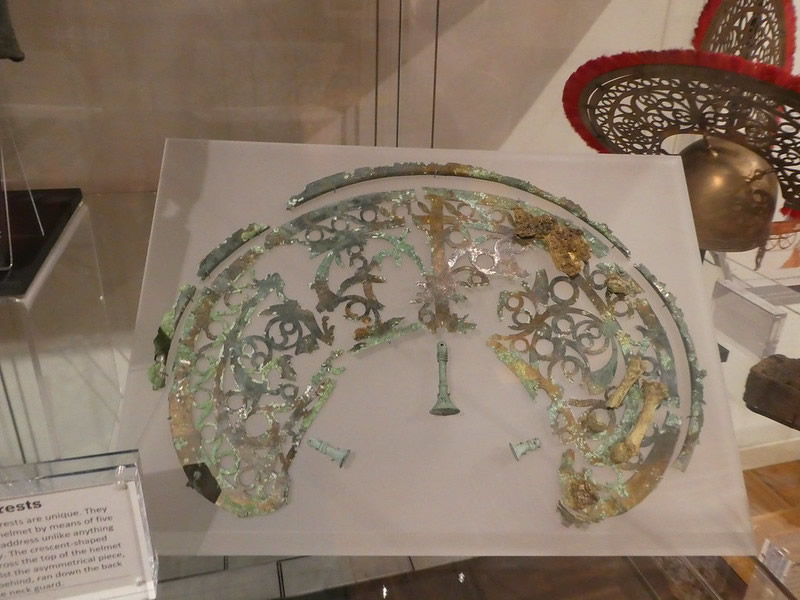
Helmet decoration

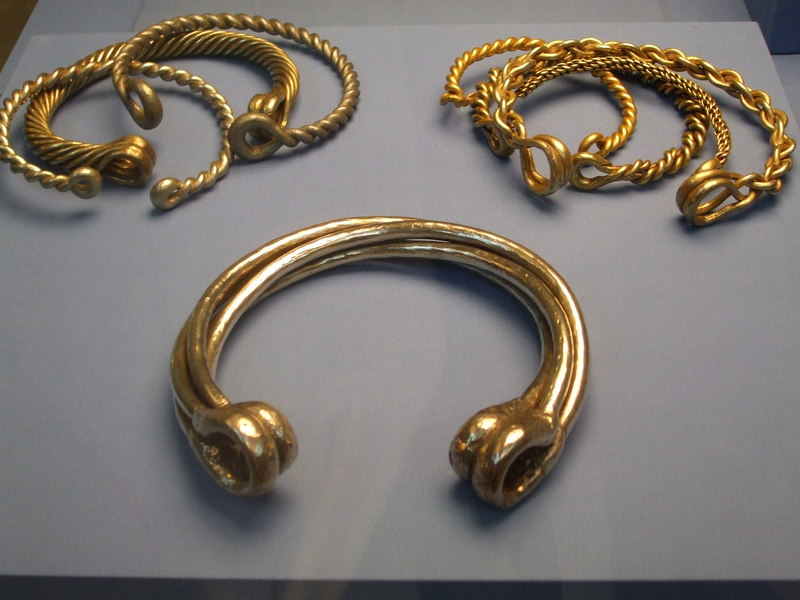
Torcs from the Snettisham Hoard

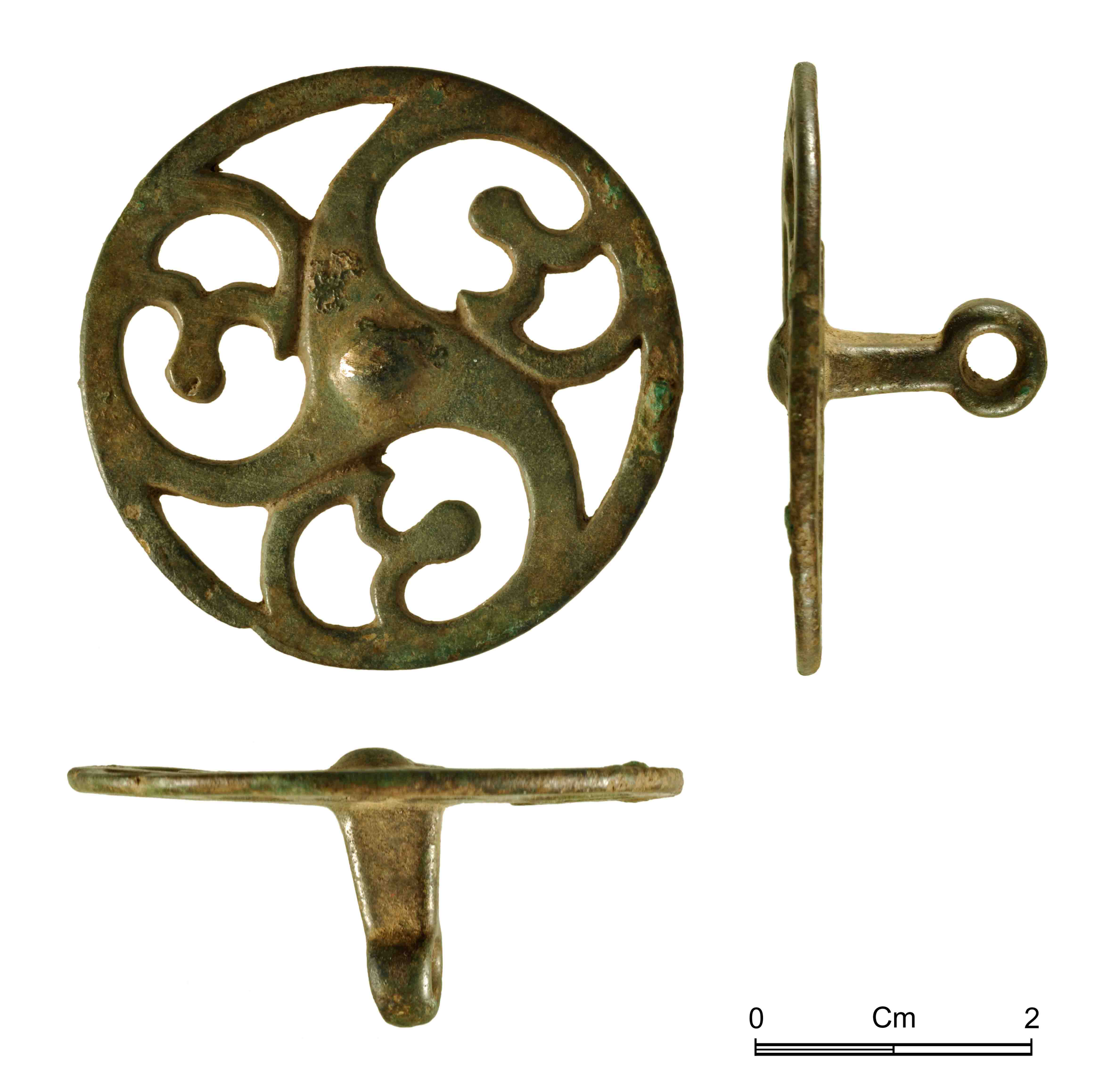
Iron Age dangler

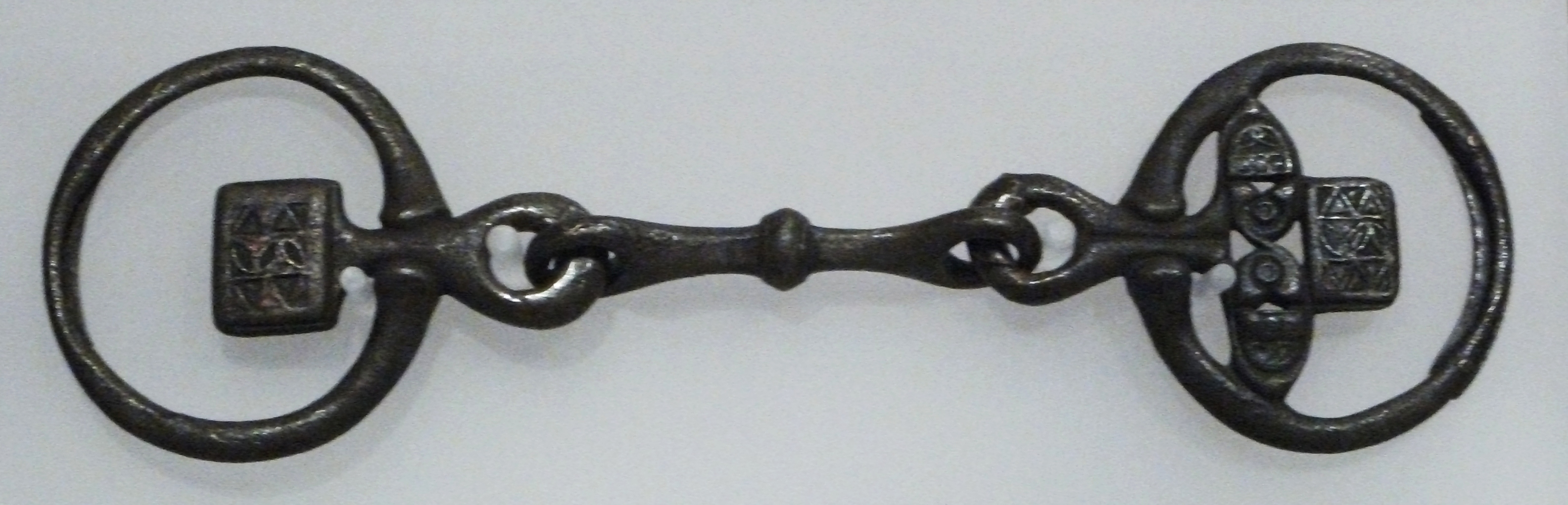
Horse harness from the Middlebie Hoard

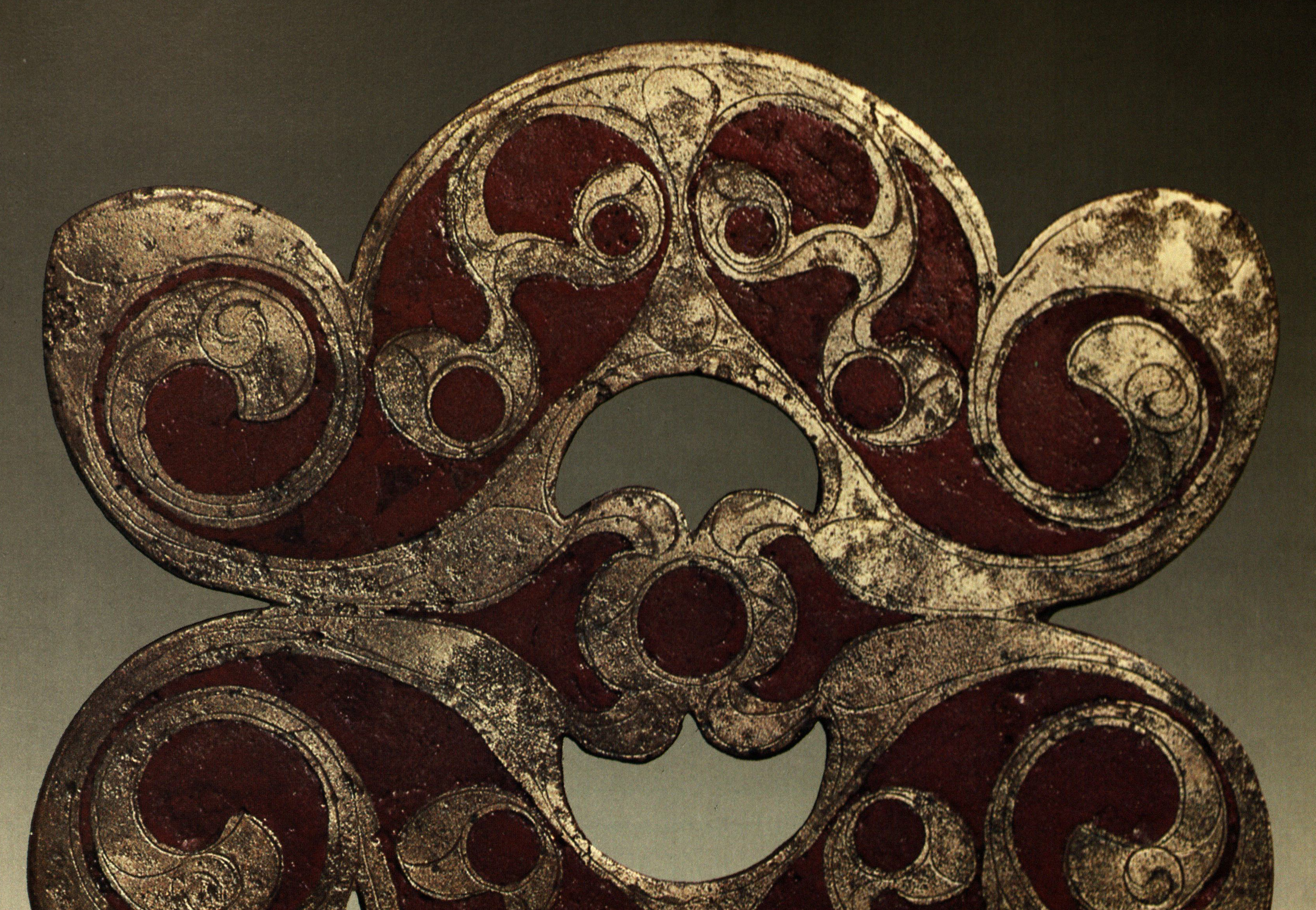
Enamelled bronze plaque

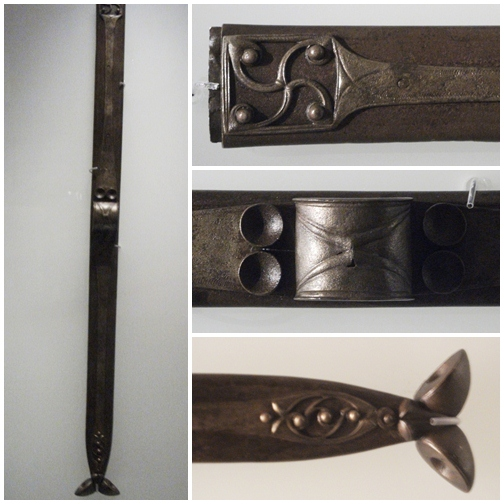
bronze sword scabbard, Mortonhall

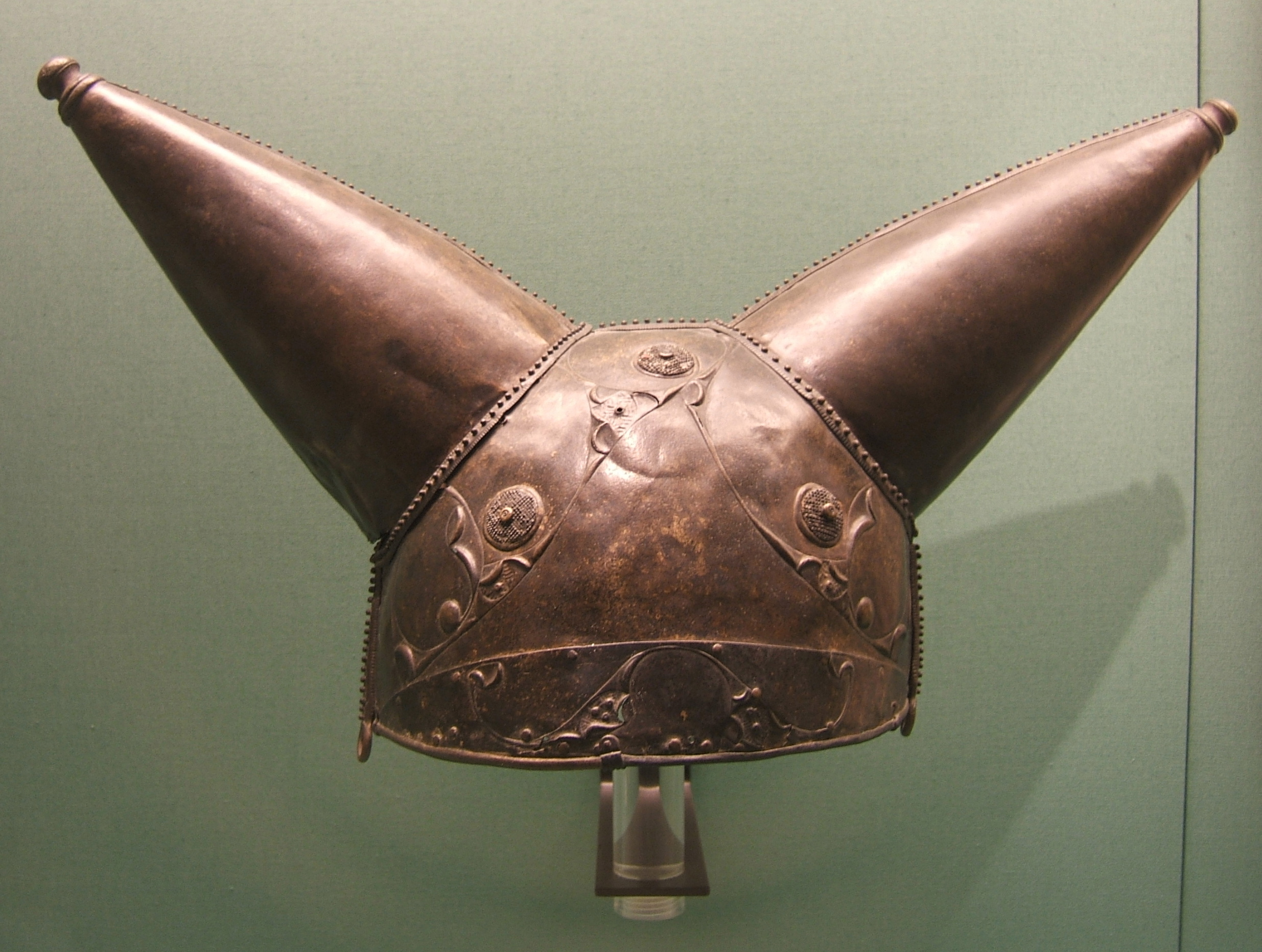
Horned Helmet

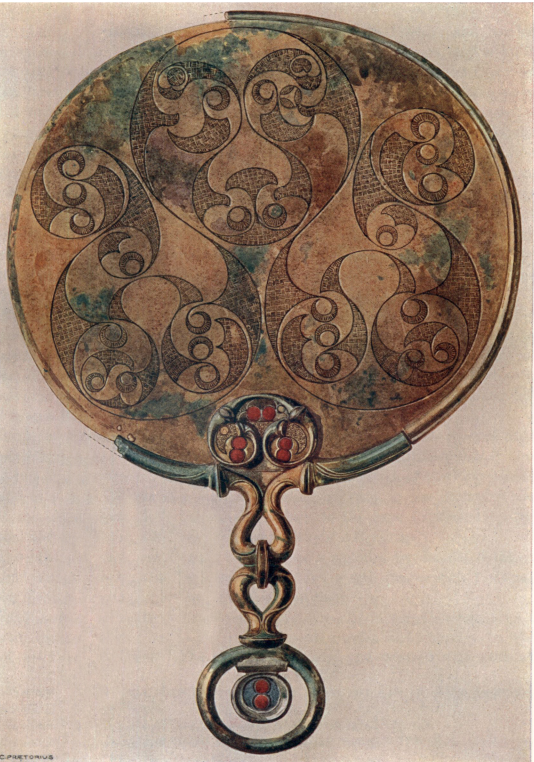
Birdlip Mirror

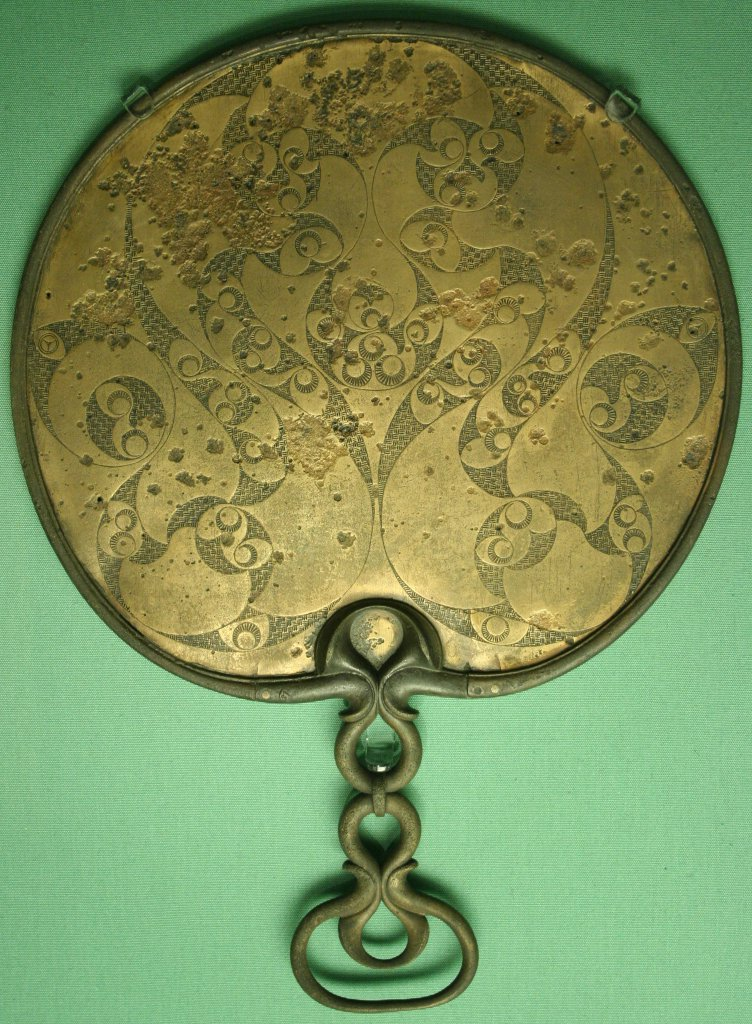
Desborough Mirror

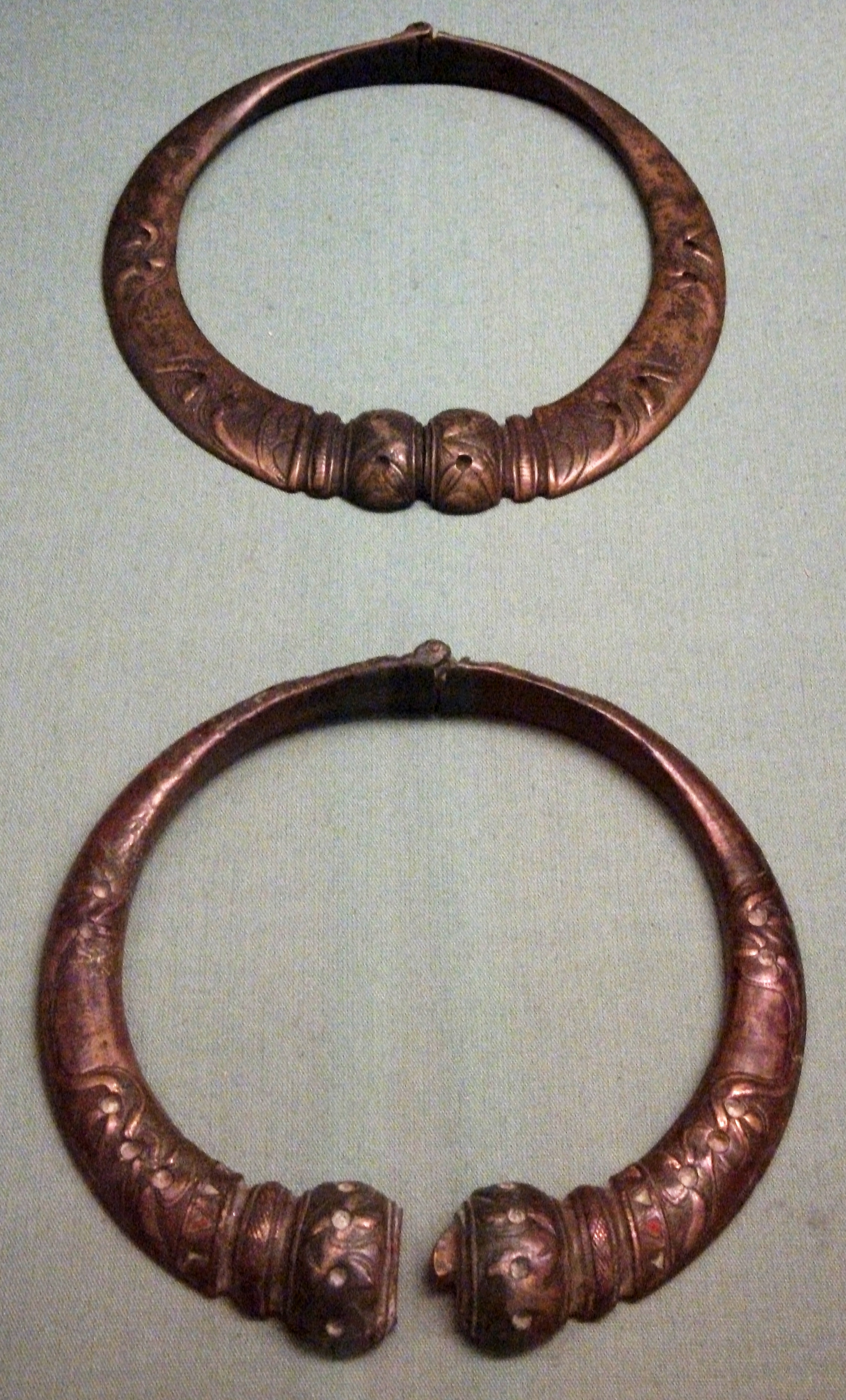
Bronze flat-backed torcs

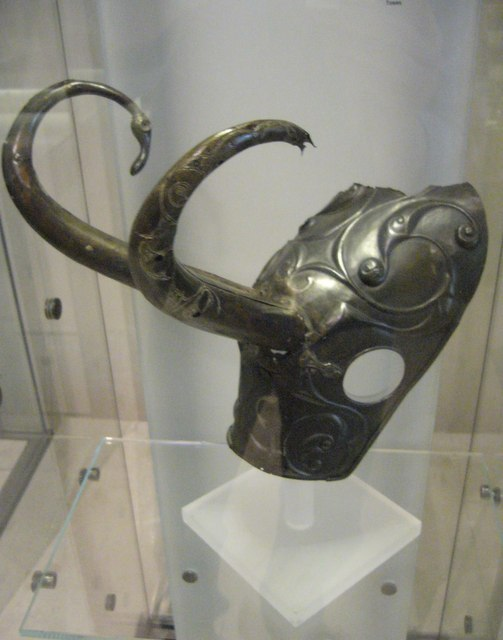
Torrs Pony-cap and Horns

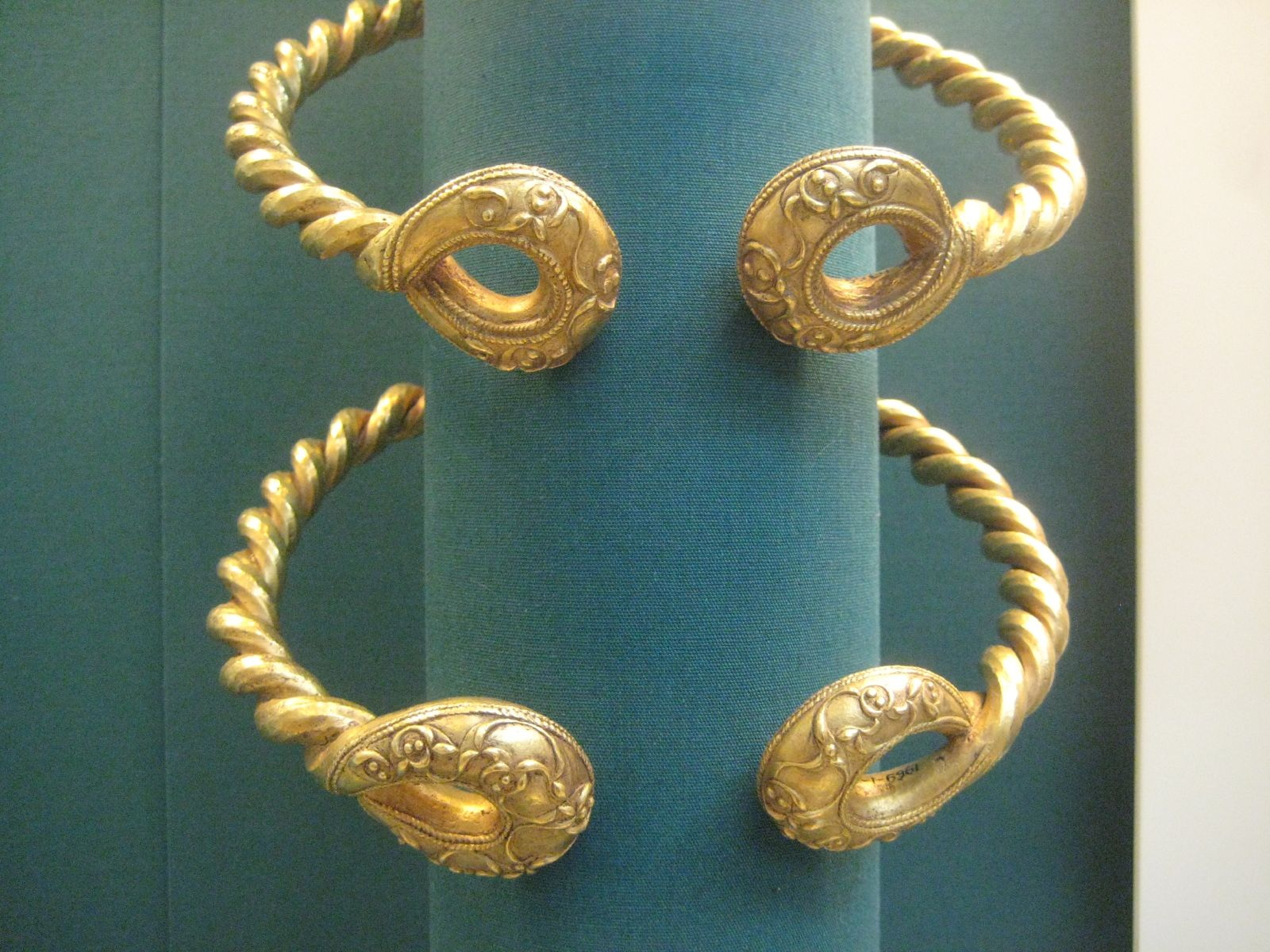
Gold torcs from the Ipswich Hoard

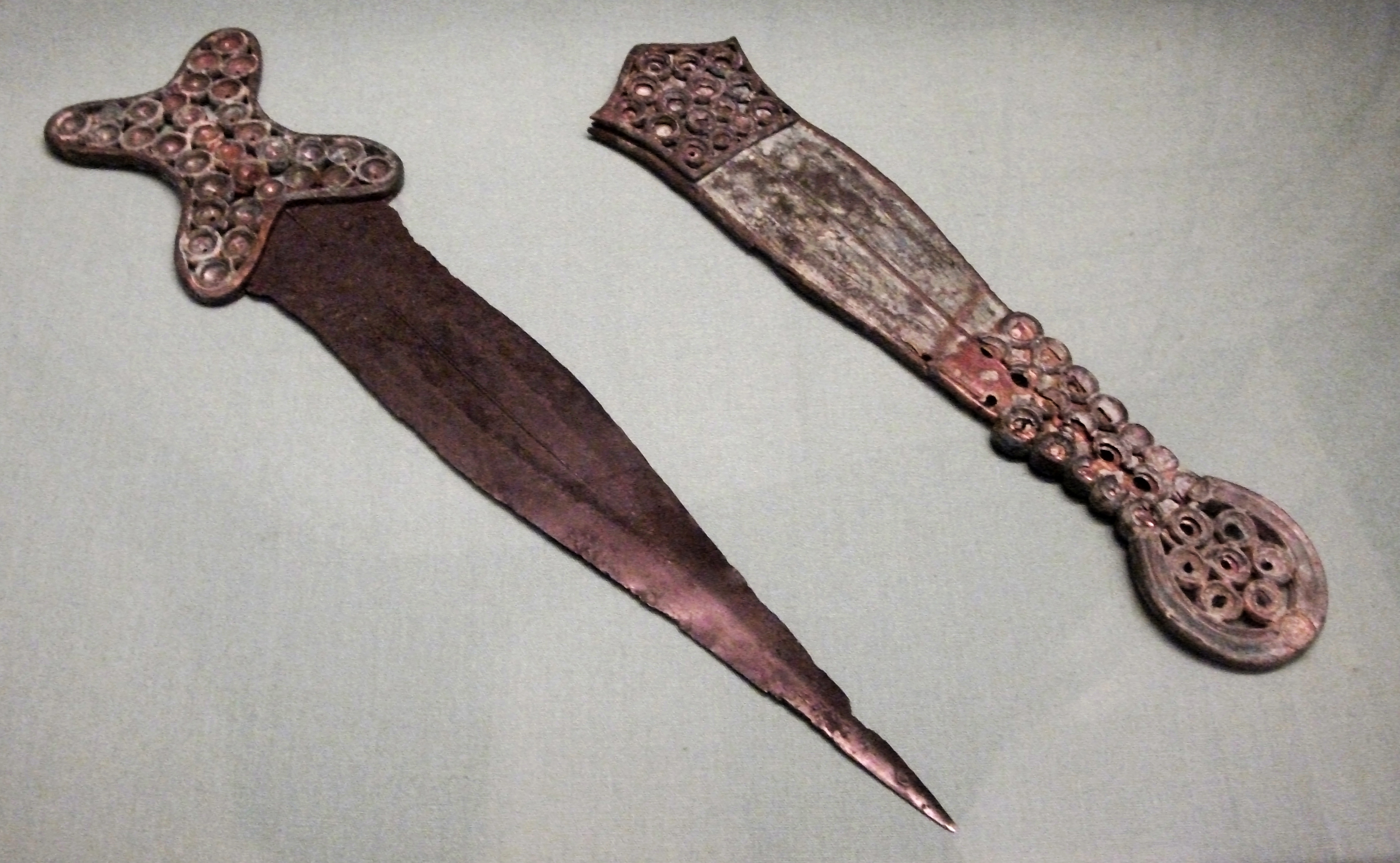
Cookham dagger and scabbard

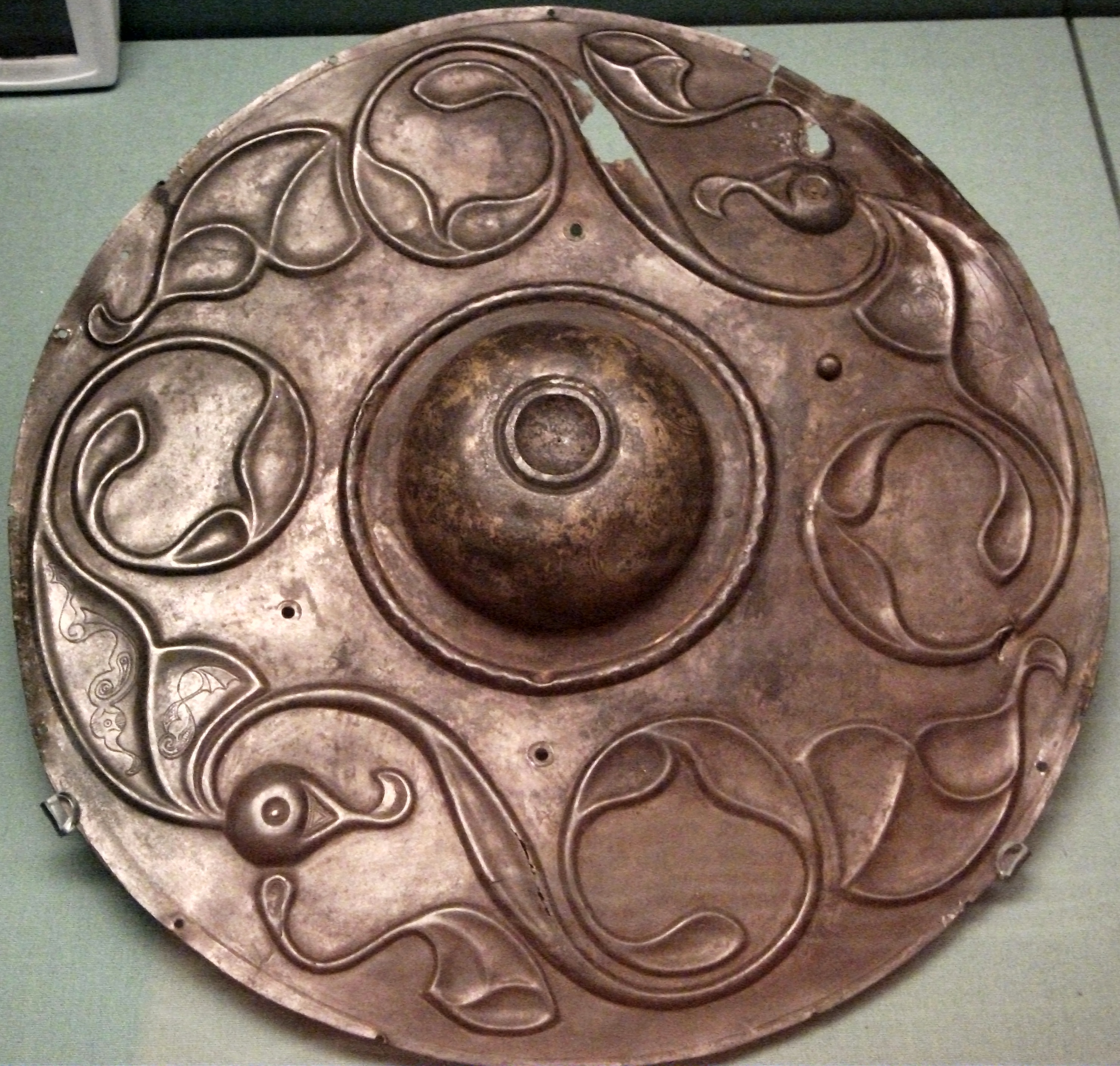
The Wandsworth Shield

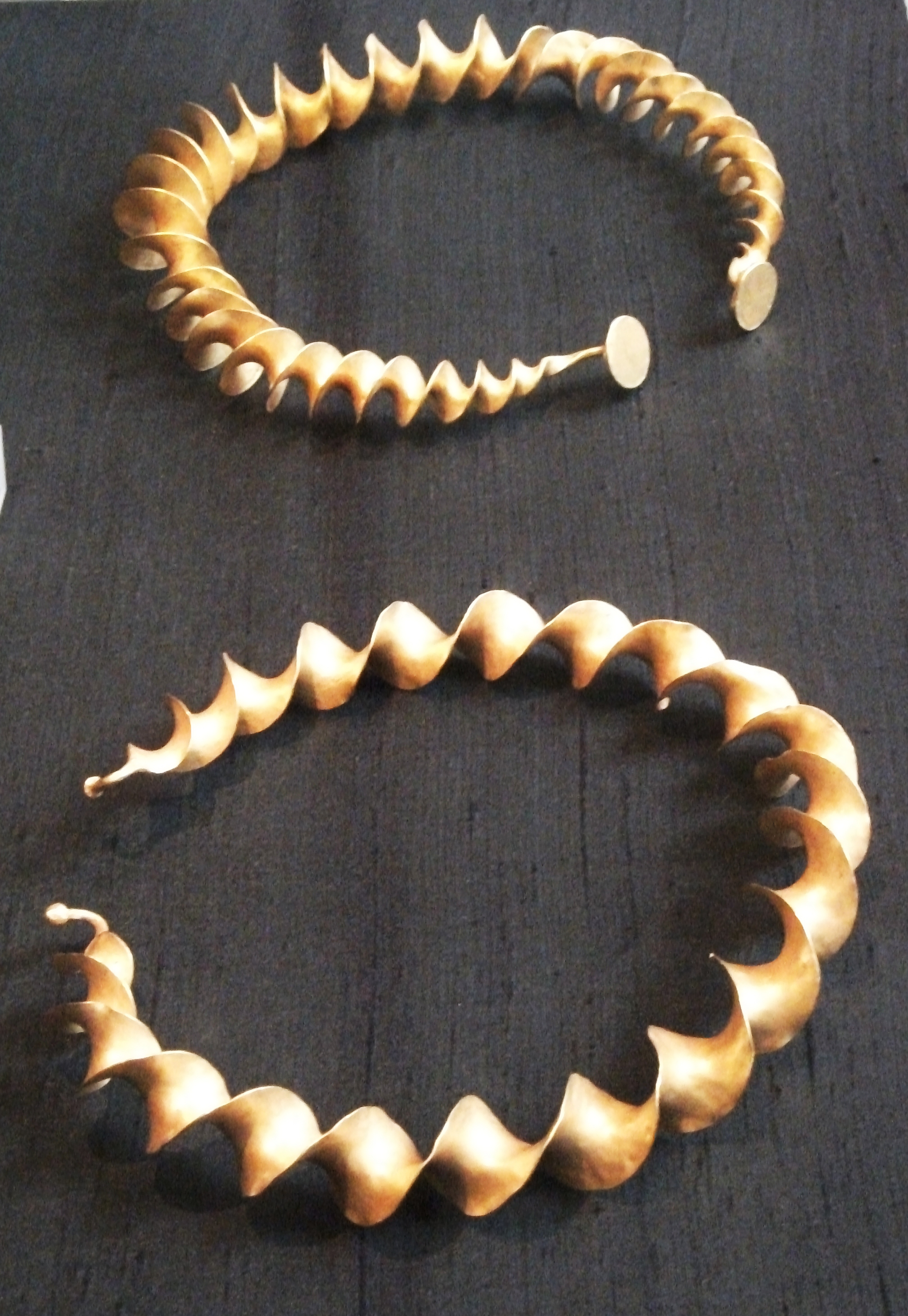
Stirling torcs

== People ==
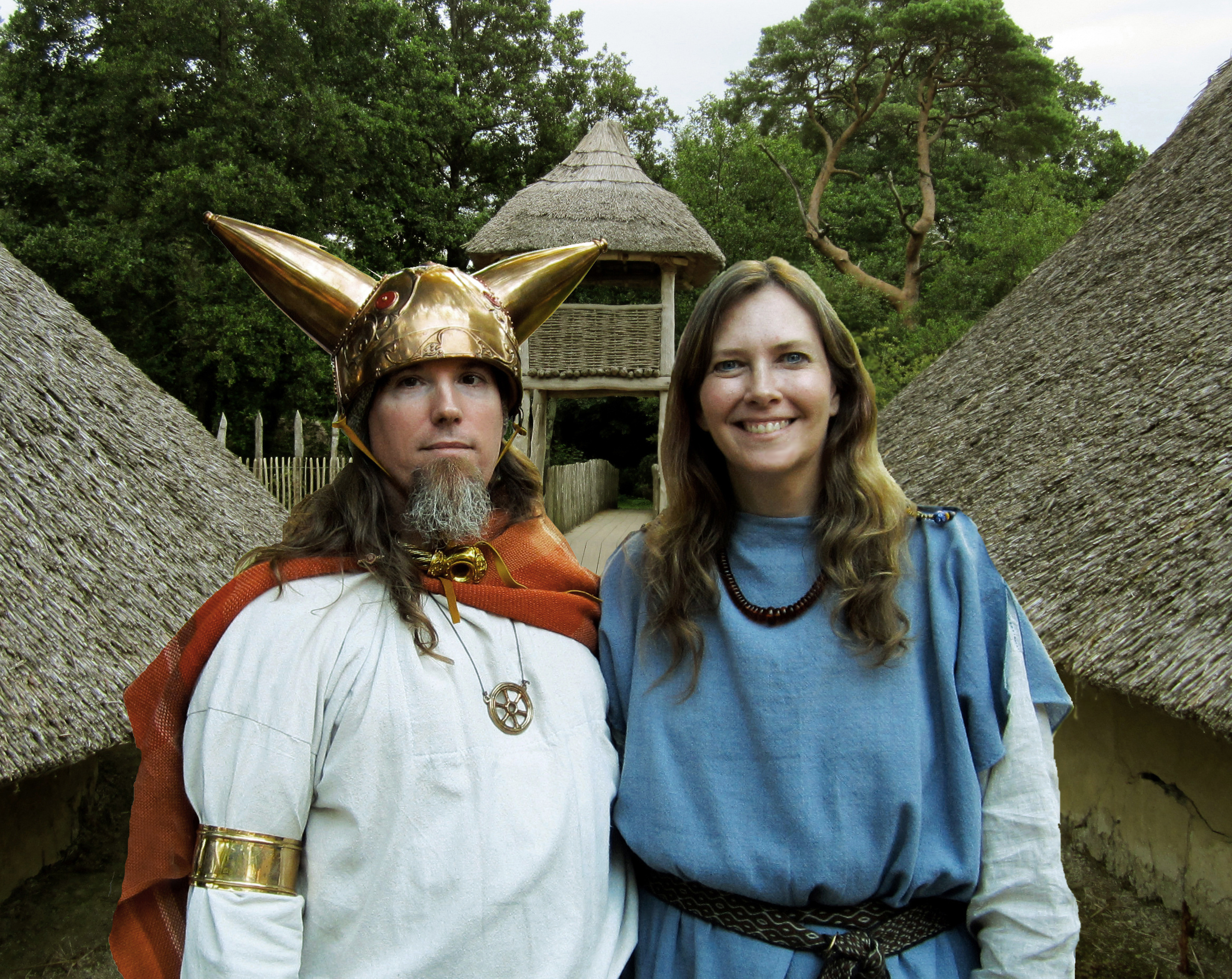
Historical re-enactors dressed as a late Iron Age Celtic British chieftain and chieftainess

Britain, we are told, is inhabited by tribes which are autochthonous and preserve in their ways of living the ancient manner of life. They use chariots, for instance, in their wars, even as tradition tells us the old Greek heroes did in the Trojan War.

— Diodorus Siculus, Bibliotheca historica, 60-30 BC

Most of the people of Iron Age Britain appear to have been Insular Celtic peoples, mainly Celtic Britons, while those in the north included the Caledonians. The Insular Celtic peoples are associated with Haplogroup R-L21, a sub-group of R-M269, which has its highest frequencies today among the Irish, Scots, Welsh, and Bretons.

The authors of a 2018 archaeogenetics study, Prof David Reich and Dr Carles Lalueza-Fox, proposed that the spread of Celtic language to Britain took place during the earlier Bronze Age, perhaps as early as the Bell Beaker migration at the start of the Bronze Age. In 2021, an archaeogenetics study (led by Nick Patterson, Michael Isakov, Thomas Booth, Lindsey Büster, and Claire-Elise Fischer) found that there was a gradual migration of people from Gaul during the Bronze Age, and that this led to a genetic change in the population of southern Britain (roughly England and Wales) at the end of the Bronze Age, between 1000 and 875 BC. Around half the ancestry of subsequent Iron Age people in that area were derived from these newcomers.

According to the authors of the 2021 study, "evidence suggests that, rather than a violent invasion or a single migratory event, the genetic structure of the population changed through sustained contacts between Britain and mainland Europe over several centuries, such as the movement of traders, intermarriage, and small scale movements of family groups". The authors describe this as a "plausible vector for the spread of early Celtic languages into Britain". There was much less migration into Britain during the Iron Age, so it is more likely that Britain became Celtic-speaking before then. Barry Cunliffe suggests that a branch of Celtic was already being spoken in Britain and that the late Bronze Age migration introduced the Brittonic branch.

The study also found that lactose tolerance rose swiftly in early Iron Age Britain, a thousand years before it became widespread in mainland Europe, which suggests that milk and dairy became a very important foodstuff in Britain at this time.

The Roman historian Tacitus suggested that the Britons were descended from people who had arrived from the Continent, and he compared the Caledonians (in modern-day Scotland) to Germanic peoples, the Silures of Southern Wales to Iberian settlers and the inhabitants of Southeastern Britannia to Gaulish tribes.

The Belgae arrived in southern Britain from the end of the 2nd century BC, as described in Caesar's Commentaries on the Gallic War. Such sudden events may be invisible in the archaeological record. In that case, it depends on the interpretation of Aylesford-Swarling pottery. Regardless of the "invasionist" vs. "diffusionist" debate, it is beyond dispute that exchanges with the Continent were a defining aspect of the British Iron Age. According to Caesar, the Britons further inland than the Belgae believed that they were indigenous.

=== Demography ===
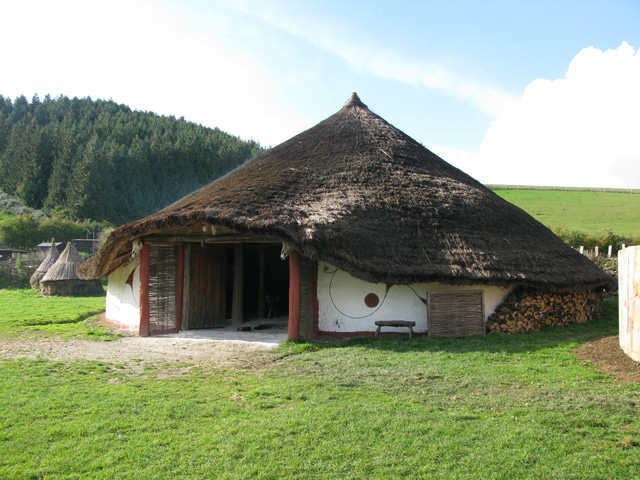
Iron Age roundhouse reconstruction

The population of Britain increased significantly during the Iron Age probably to more than one million, partly due to improved barley and wheat and increased use of peas, beans and flax. Most were concentrated densely in the agricultural lands of the South. Settlement density and a land shortage may have contributed to rising tensions during the period. The average life expectancy at birth would have been around 25, but at the age of five, it would have been around 30. Those figures would be slightly lower for women, and slightly higher for men throughout the Middle Iron Age in most areas, on account of the high mortality rate of young women during childbirth; however, the average age for the two sexes would be roughly equal for the Late Iron Age. That interpretation depends on the view that warfare and social strife increased in the Late Iron Age, which seems to be fairly well attested in the archaeological record for Southern Britain at least.

Early in the Iron Age, the widespread Wessex pottery of Southern Britain, such as the type style from All Cannings Cross, may suggest a consolidated socio-economic group in the region. However, by 600 BC, that appears to have broken down into differing sub-groups with their own pottery styles. Between c. 400 and 100 BC, there is evidence of emerging regional identities and a significant population increase.

== Settlements and architecture ==
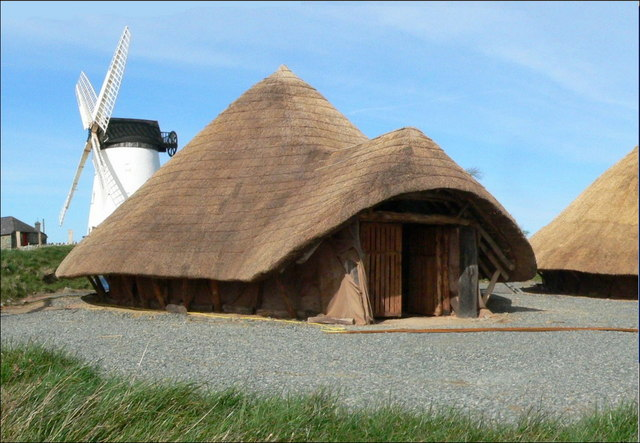
Roundhouse reconstruction, Wales

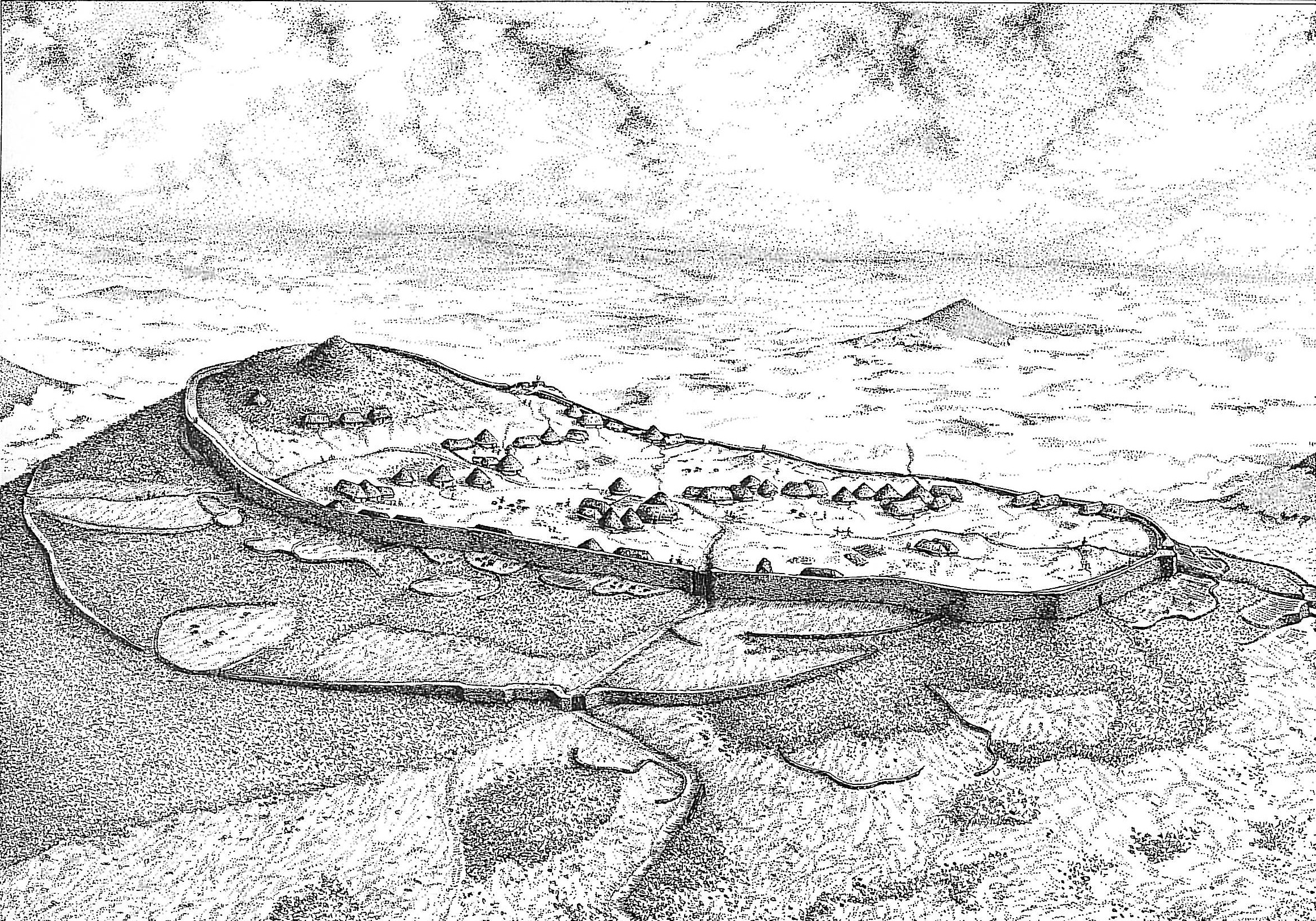
Tre'r Ceiri hillfort, Wales

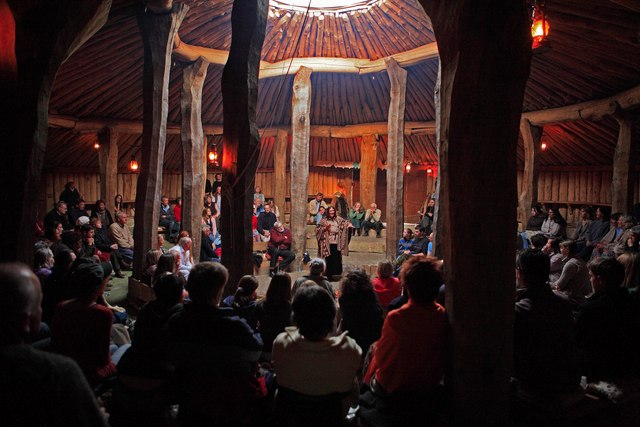
'Earth house' reconstruction, interior, England.

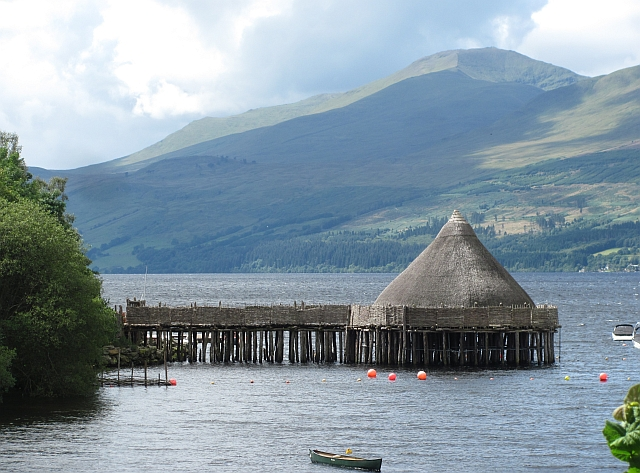
Crannog reconstruction, Scotland

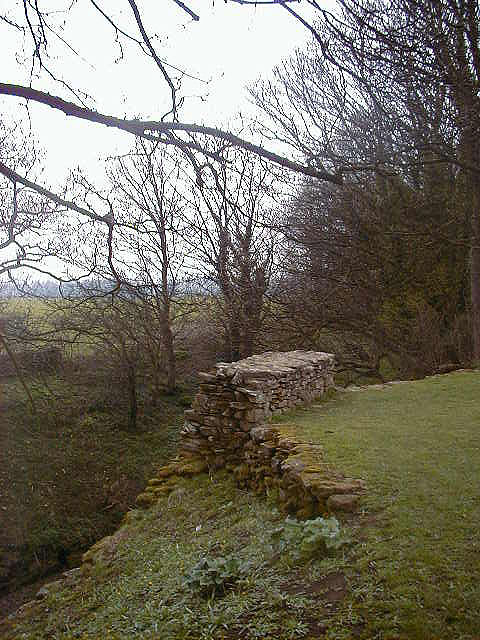
Remains of fortifications at the Stanwick hillfort, England

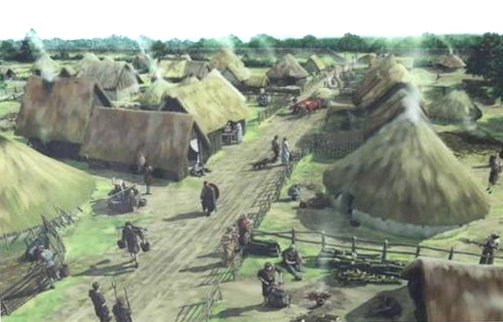
Silchester Iron Age town, England

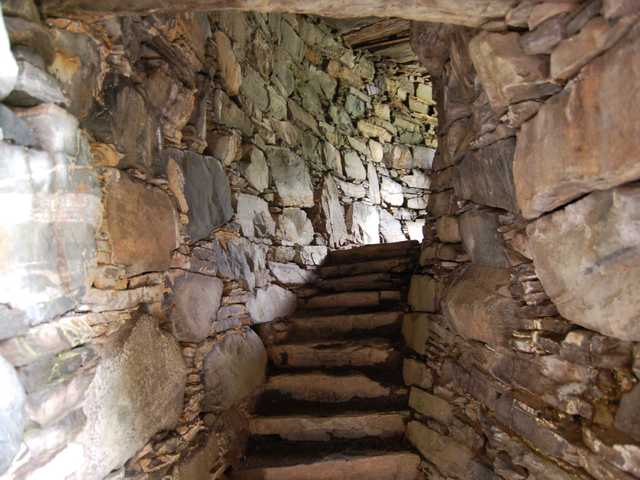
Broch of Dun Troddan, Scotland, internal stairs

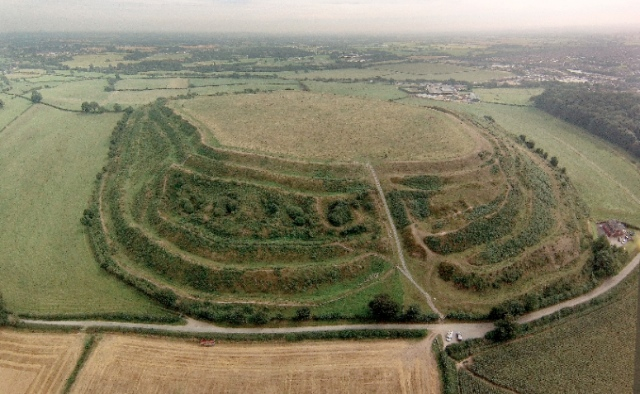
Old Oswestry hillfort remains, England

== Iron Age beliefs in Britain ==
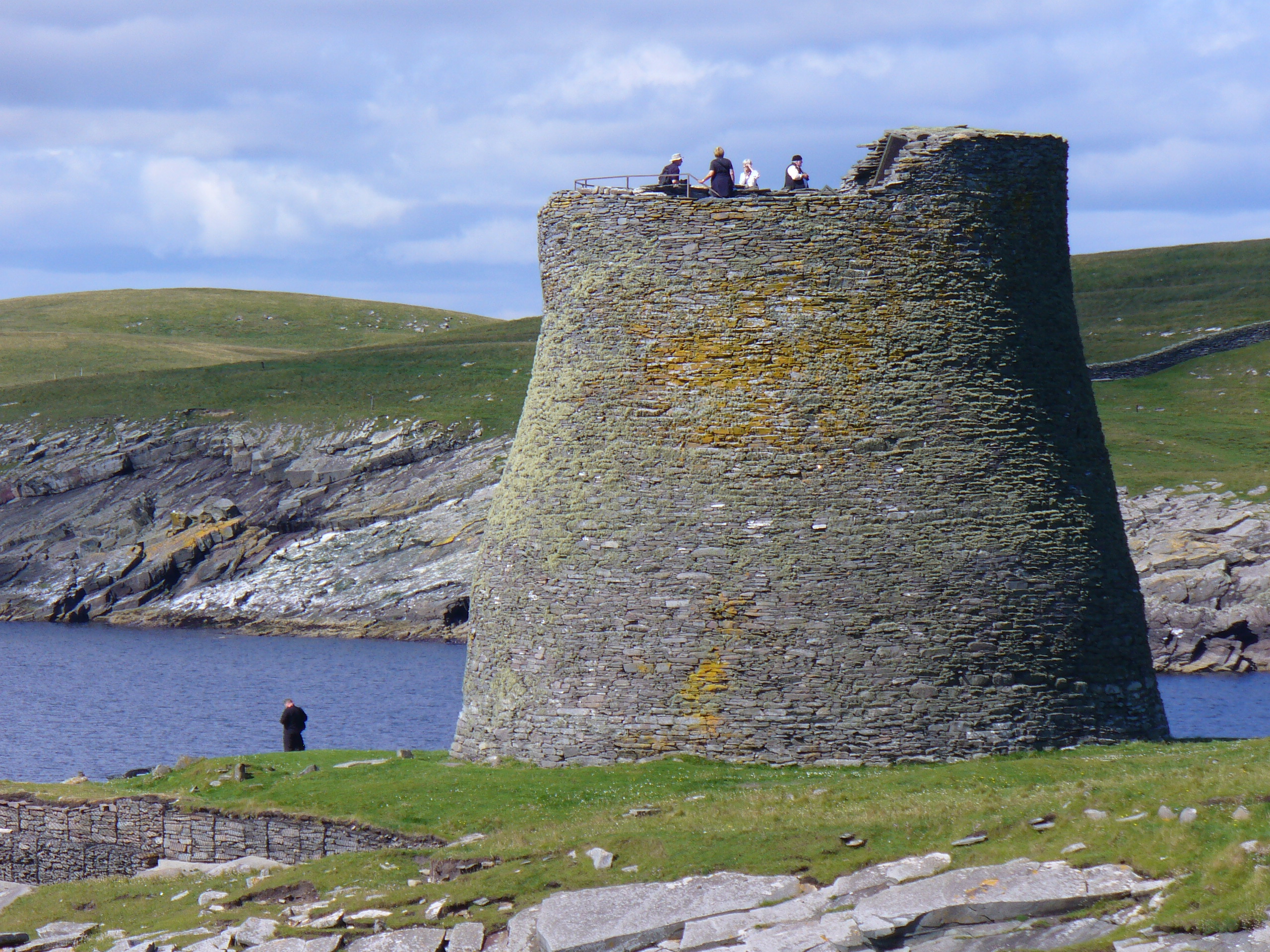
Broch of Mousa, Scotland, c. 300-100 BC

The Romans described a variety of deities worshipped by the people of Northwestern Europe. Barry Cunliffe perceives a division between one group of gods relating to masculinity, the sky and individual tribes and a second group of goddesses relating to associations with fertility, the earth and a universality that transcended tribal differences. Wells and springs had female, divine links exemplified by the goddess Sulis worshipped at Bath. In Agricola (2.21), Tacitus notes the similarity between both religious and ritual practices of the pre-Roman British and the Gauls.

Religious practices often involved the ritual slaughter of animals or the deposition of metalwork, especially war booty. Weapons and horse trappings have been found in the bog at Llyn Cerrig Bach on Anglesey and are interpreted as votive offerings cast into a lake. Numerous weapons have also been recovered from rivers, especially the Thames but also the Trent and Tyne. Some buried hoards of jewellery are interpreted as gifts to the earth gods.

Disused grain storage pits and the ends of ditches have also produced what appear to be deliberately-placed deposits, including a preference for burials of horses, dogs and ravens. The bodies were often mutilated, and some human finds at the bottom of pits, such as those found at Danebury, may have had a ritual aspect.

Caesar's texts state that the priests of Britain were Druids, a religious elite with considerable holy and secular powers. Great Britain appears to have been the seat of the Druidic religion, and Tacitus's account of the later raid on Anglesey led by Suetonius Paulinus gives some indication of its nature. No archaeological evidence survives of Druidry, but a number of burials made with ritual trappings and found in Kent may suggest a religious character to the subjects.

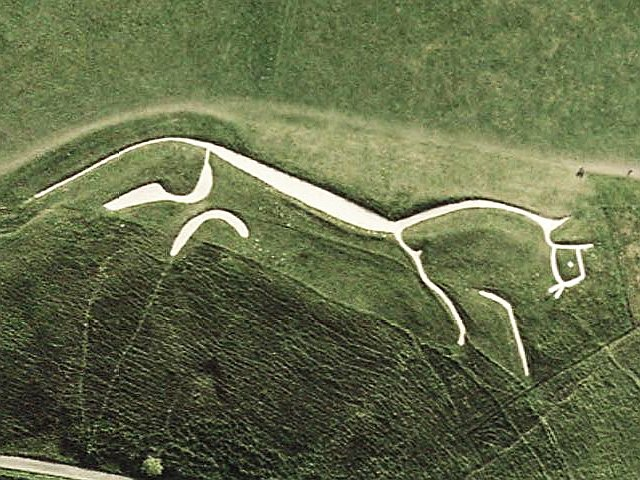
The Uffington White Horse, England

Overall, the traditional view is that religion was practiced in natural settings in the open air. Gildas mentions "those diabolical idols of my country, which almost surpassed in number those of Egypt, and of which we still see some mouldering away within or without the deserted temples, with stiff and deformed features as was customary". Sites such as at Hayling Island, in Hampshire, and the one found during construction work at Heathrow Airport are interpreted as purpose-built shrines. The Hayling Island example was a circular wooden building set within a rectangular precinct and was rebuilt in stone as a Romano-British temple in the 1st century AD to the same plan. The Heathrow temple was a small cella surrounded by a ring of postholes thought to have formed an ambulatory, which is very similar to Romano-Celtic temples found elsewhere in Europe. A rectangular structure at Danebury and a sequence of six-poster structures overlooking calf burials and culminating in a trench-founded rectangular structure at Cadbury Castle, Somerset, have been similarly interpreted. An example at Sigwells, overlooking Cadbury Castle, was associated with metalwork and whole and partial animal burials to its east. However, evidence of an open-air shrine was found at Hallaton, Leicestershire. Here, a collection of objects known as the Hallaton Treasure were buried in a ditch in the early 1st century AD. The only structural evidence was a wooden palisade built in the ditch.

Death in Iron Age Great Britain seems to have produced different behaviours in different regions. Cremation was a common method of disposing of the dead, but the chariot burials and other inhumations of the Arras culture of East Yorkshire and the cist burials of Cornwall demonstrate that it was not ubiquitous. In Dorset, the Durotriges seem to have had small inhumation cemeteries, sometimes with high status grave goods. In fact, the general dearth of excavated Iron Age burials makes drawing conclusions difficult. Excarnation has been suggested as a reason for the lack of burial evidence, with the remains of the dead being dispersed either naturally or through human agency.

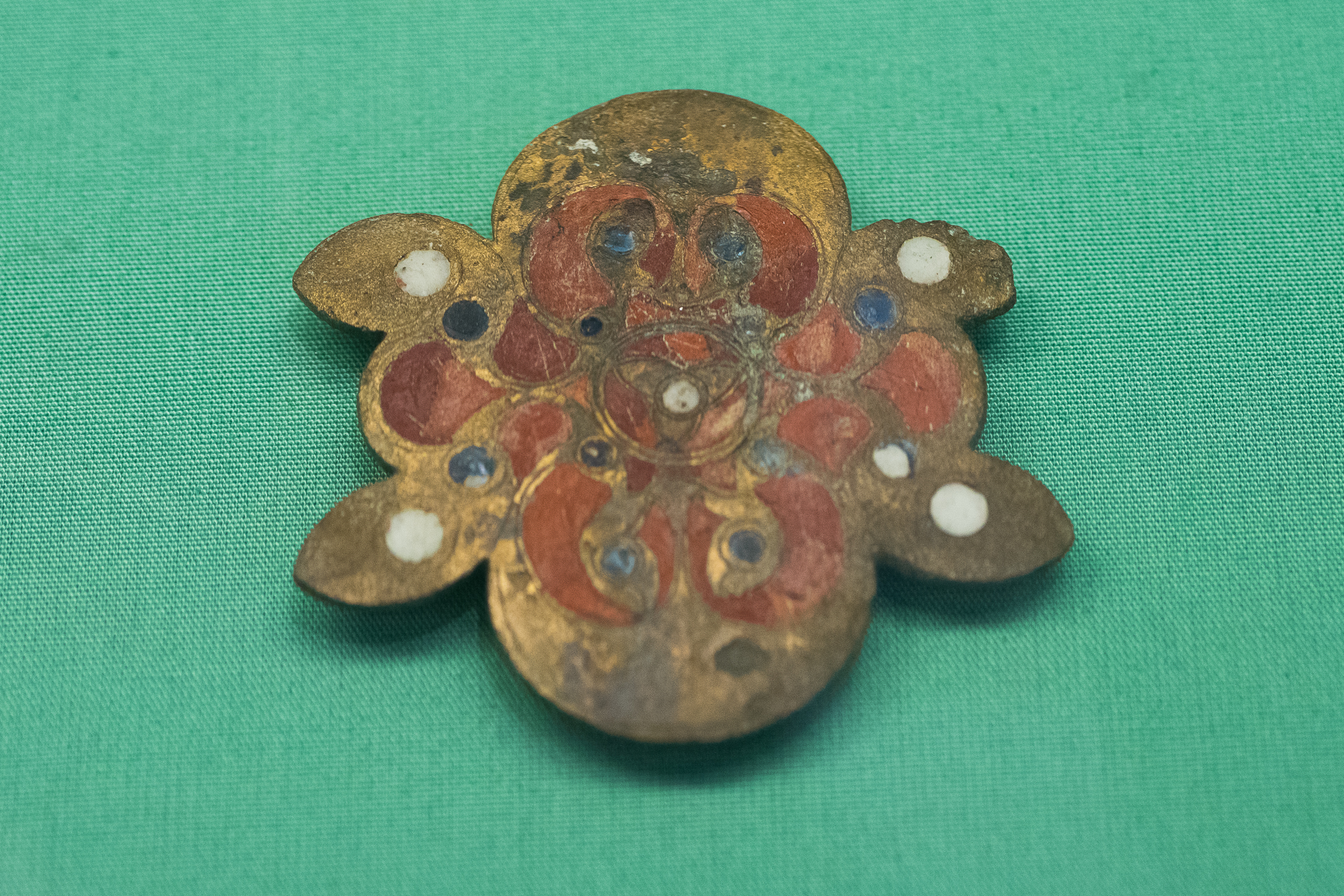

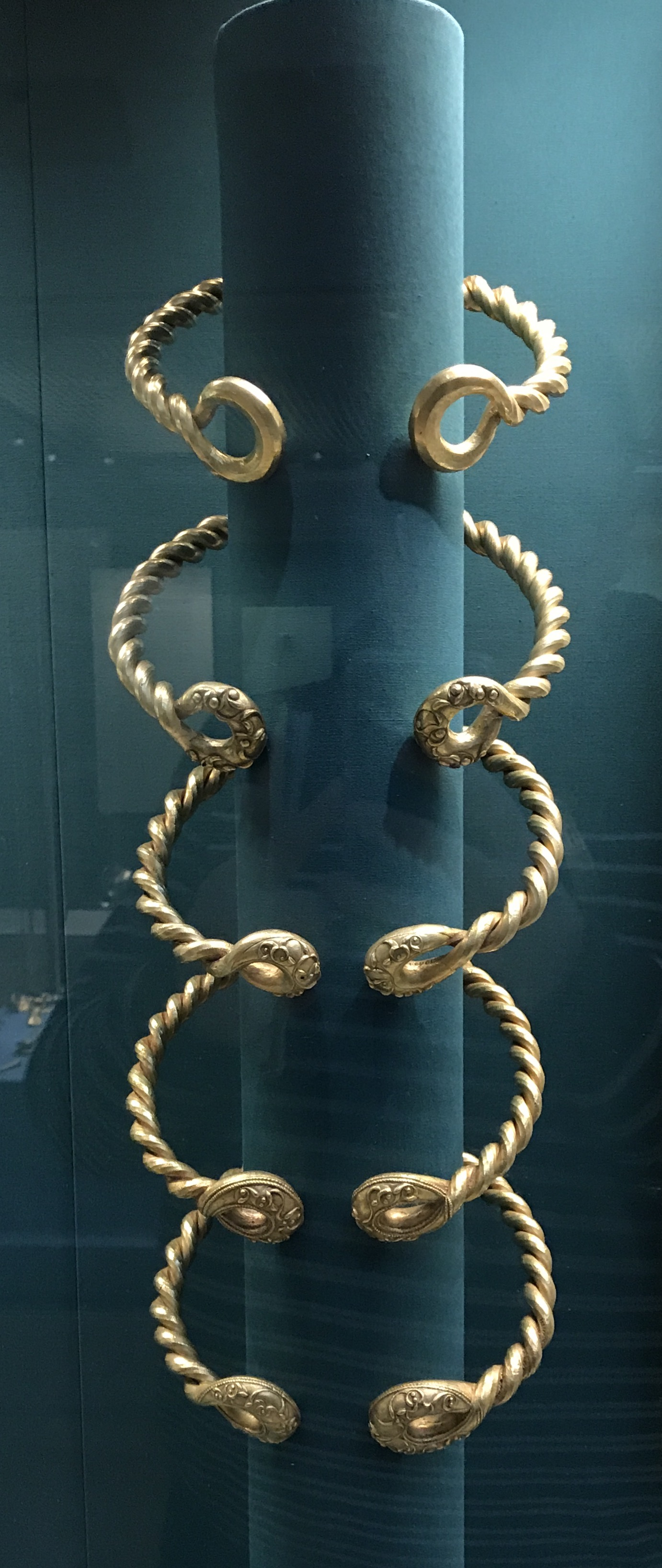

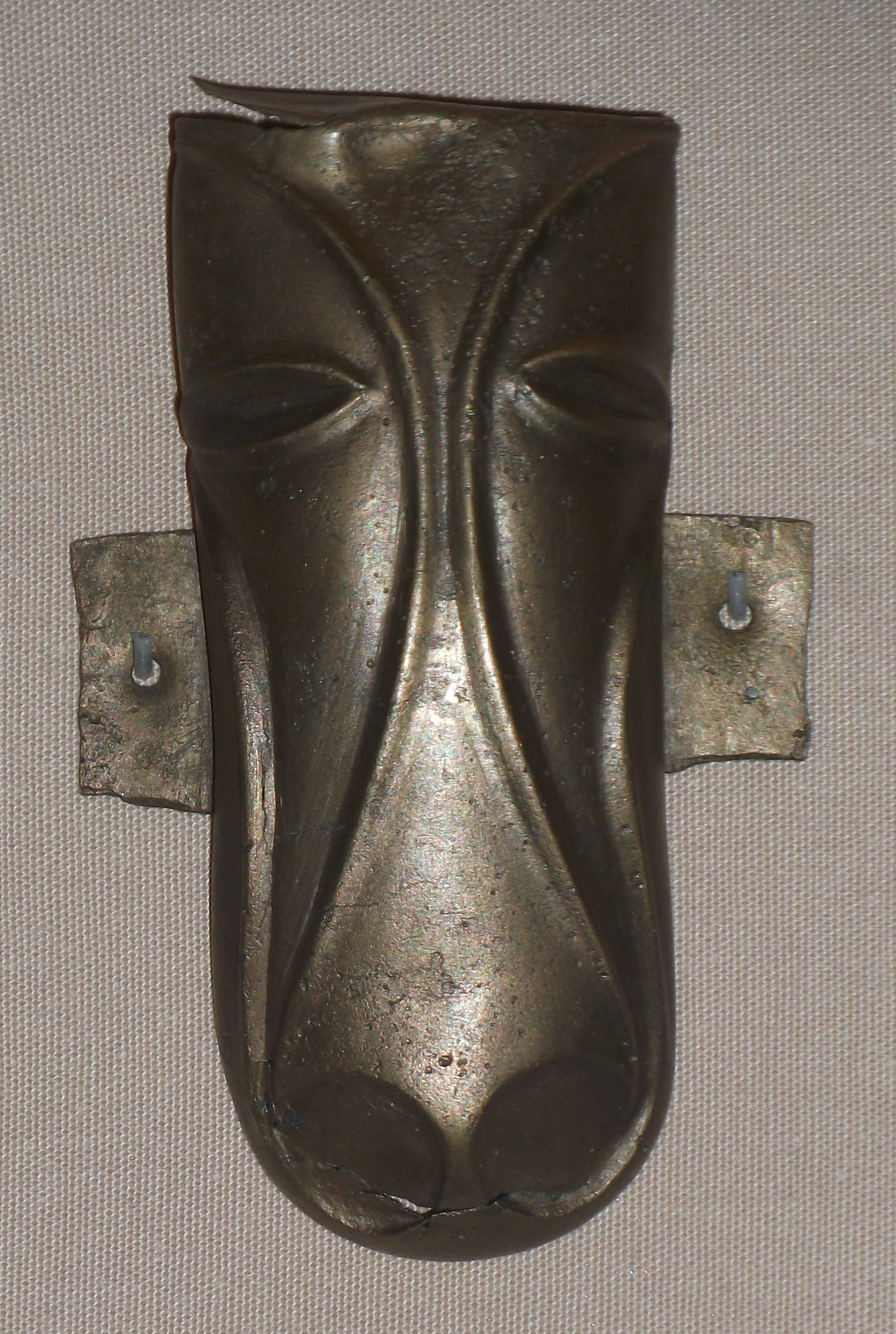

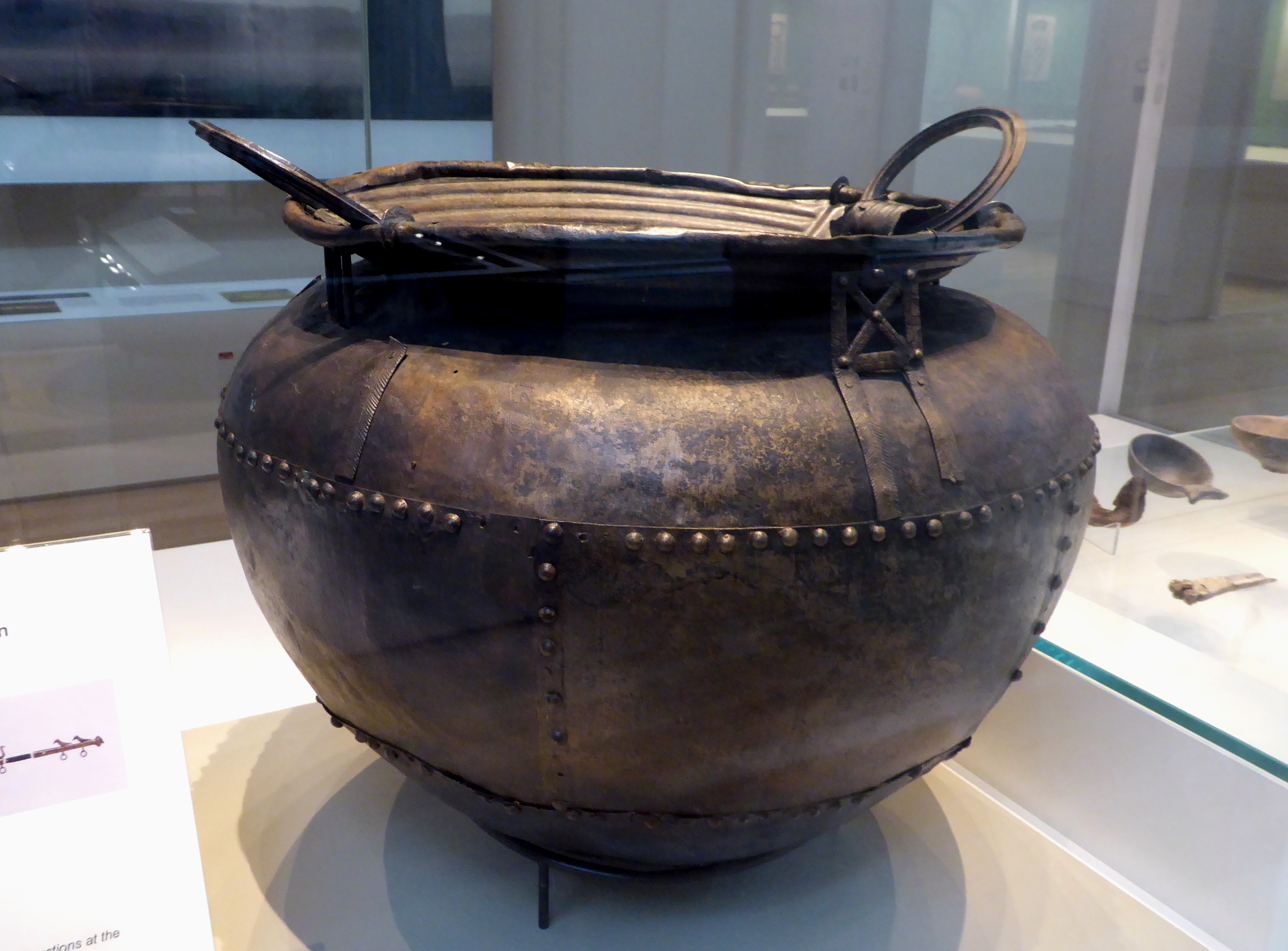

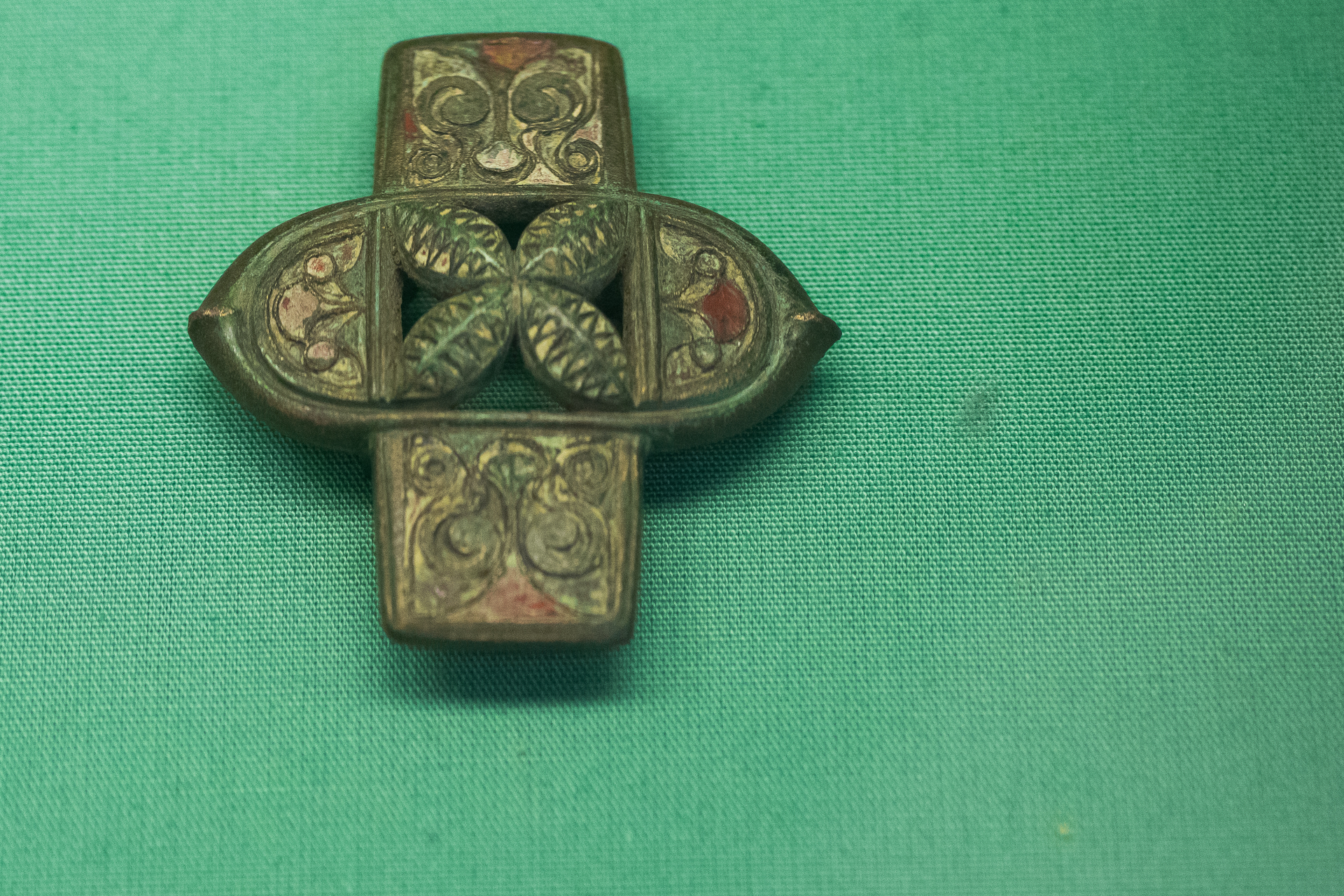

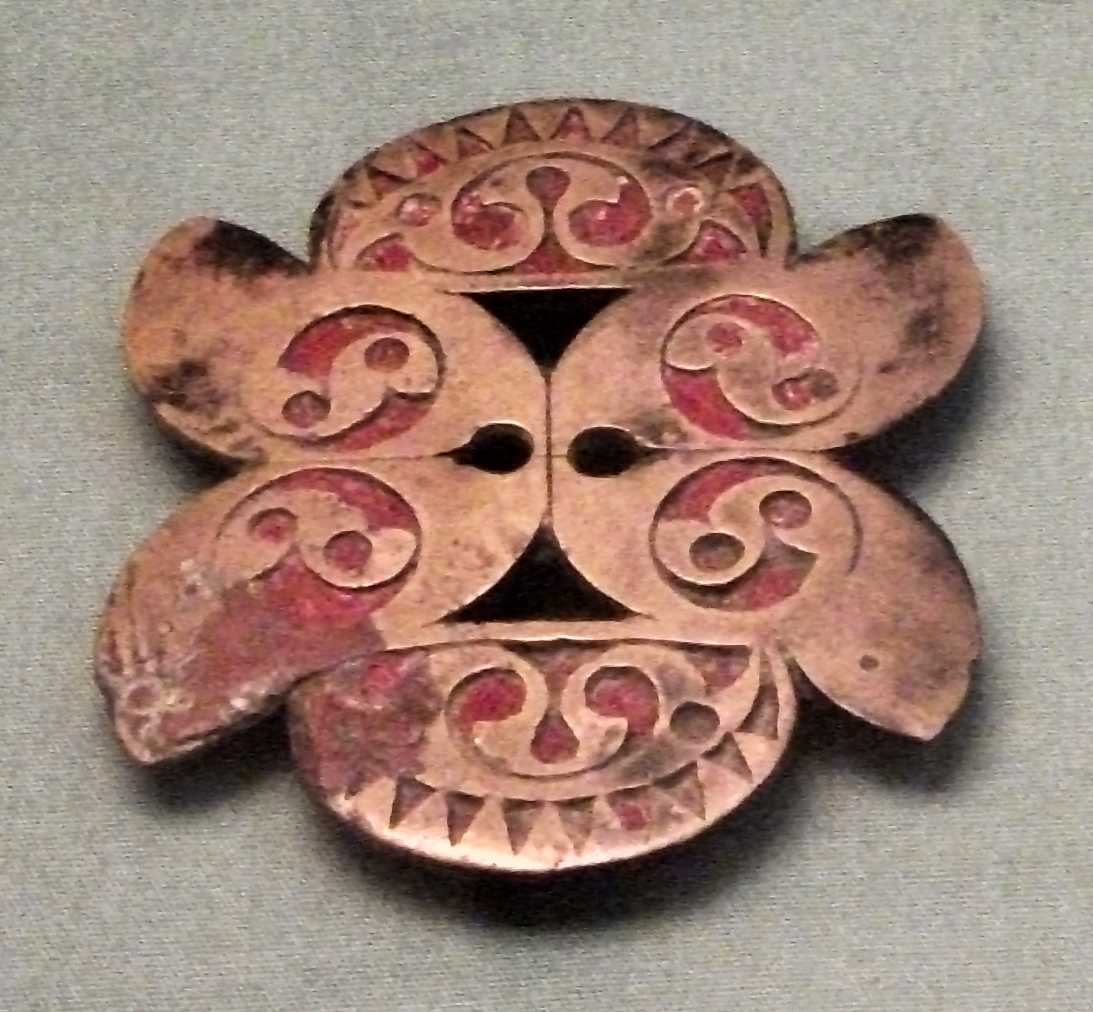

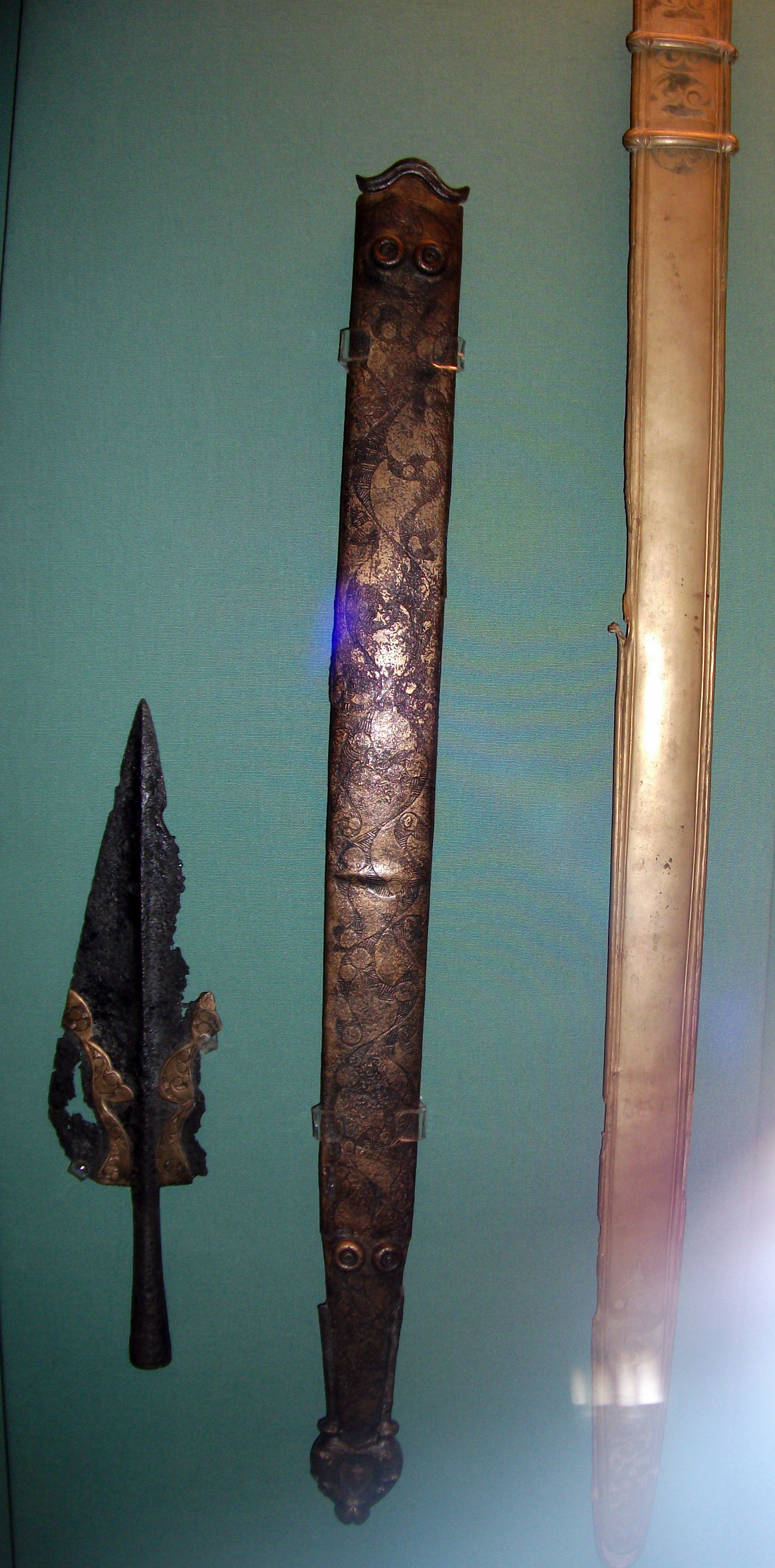

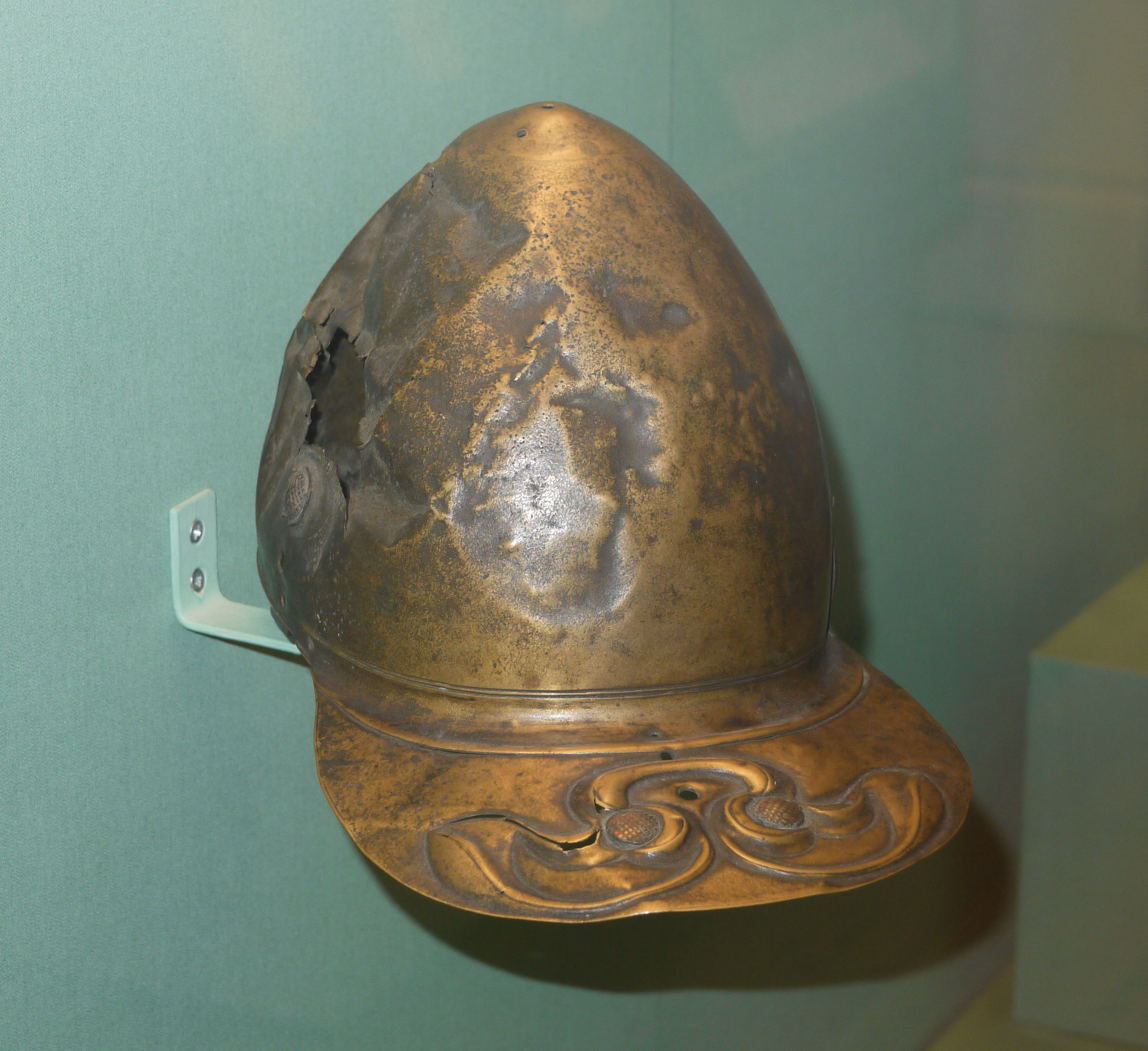

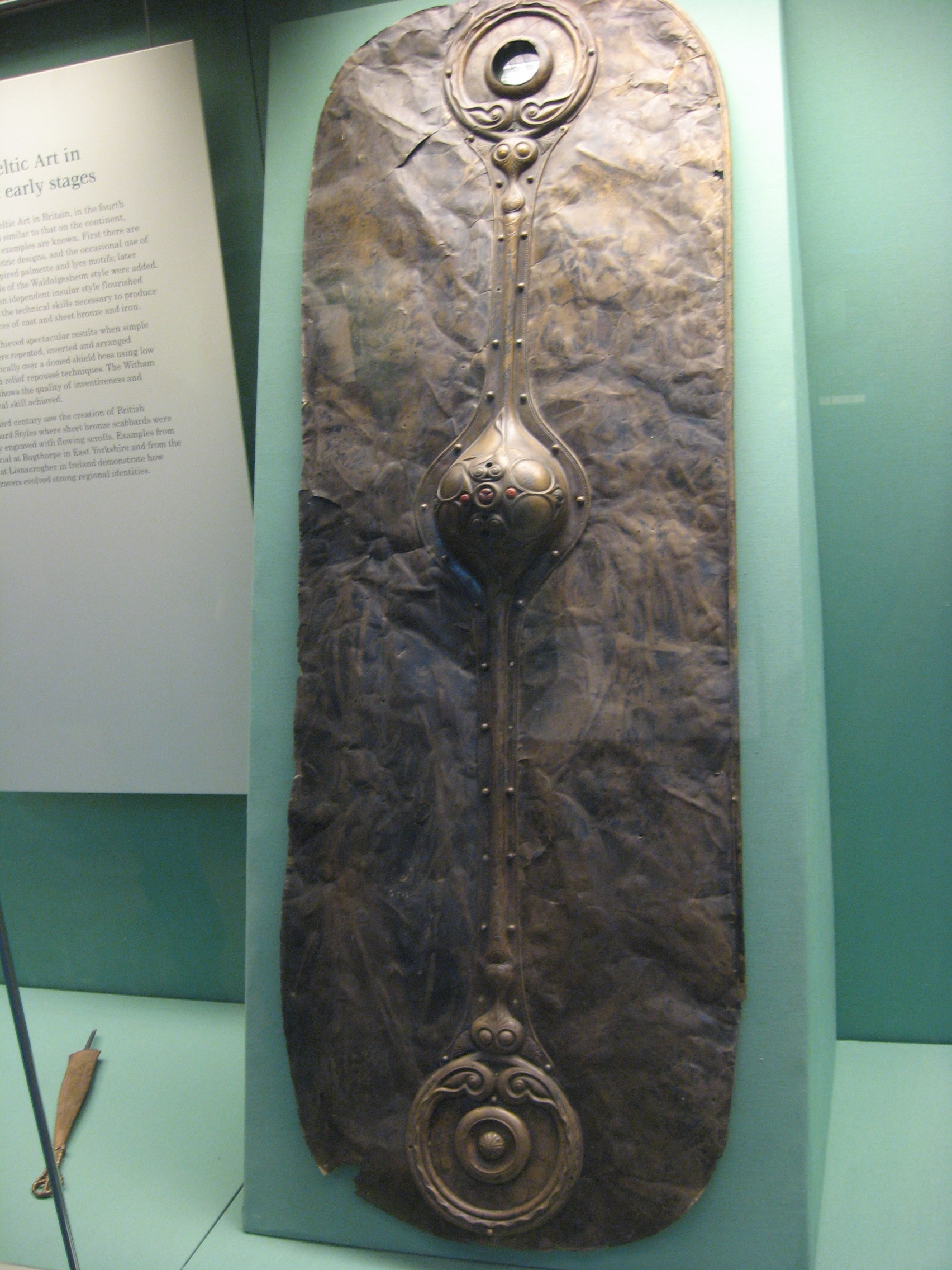

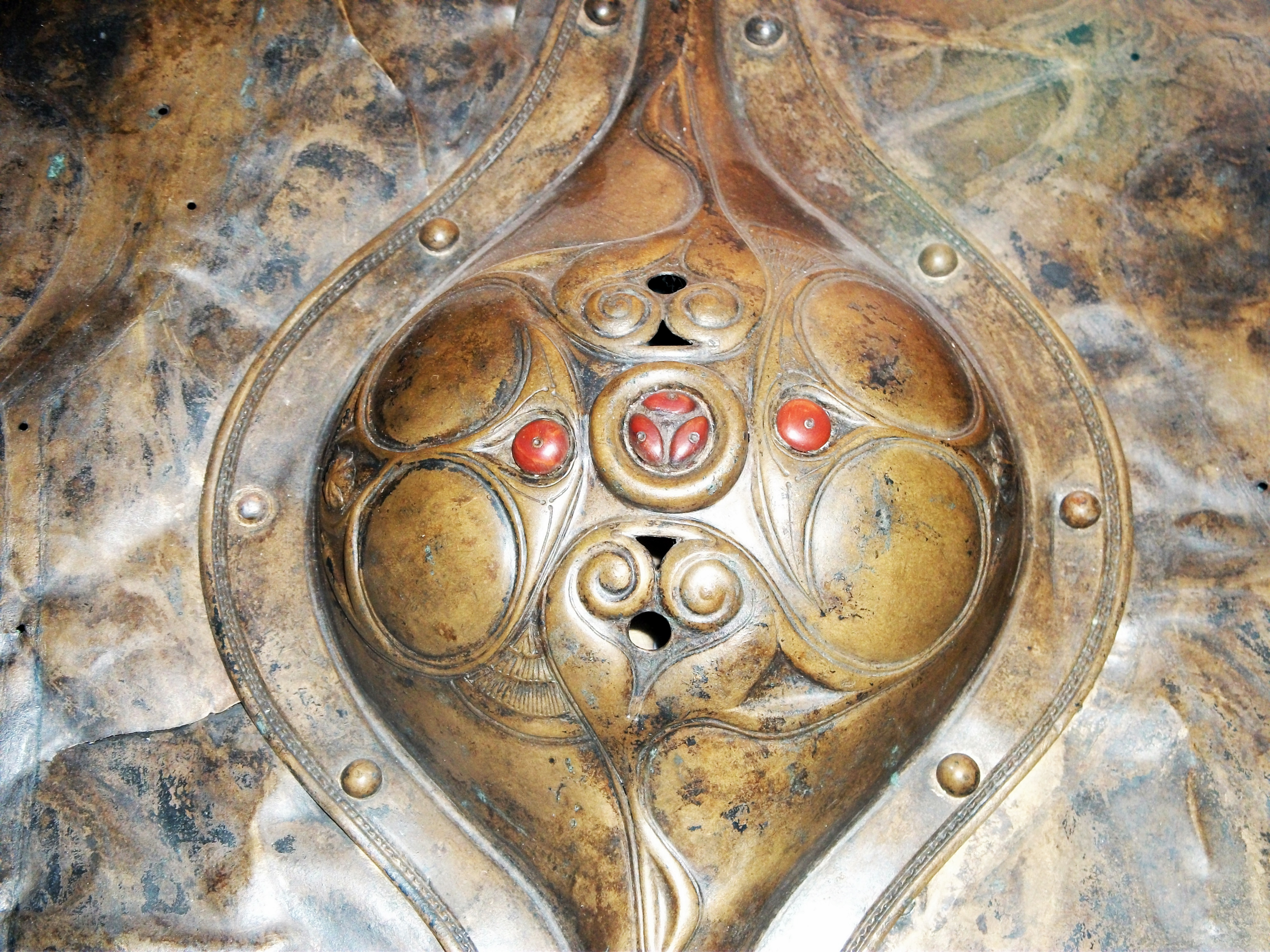

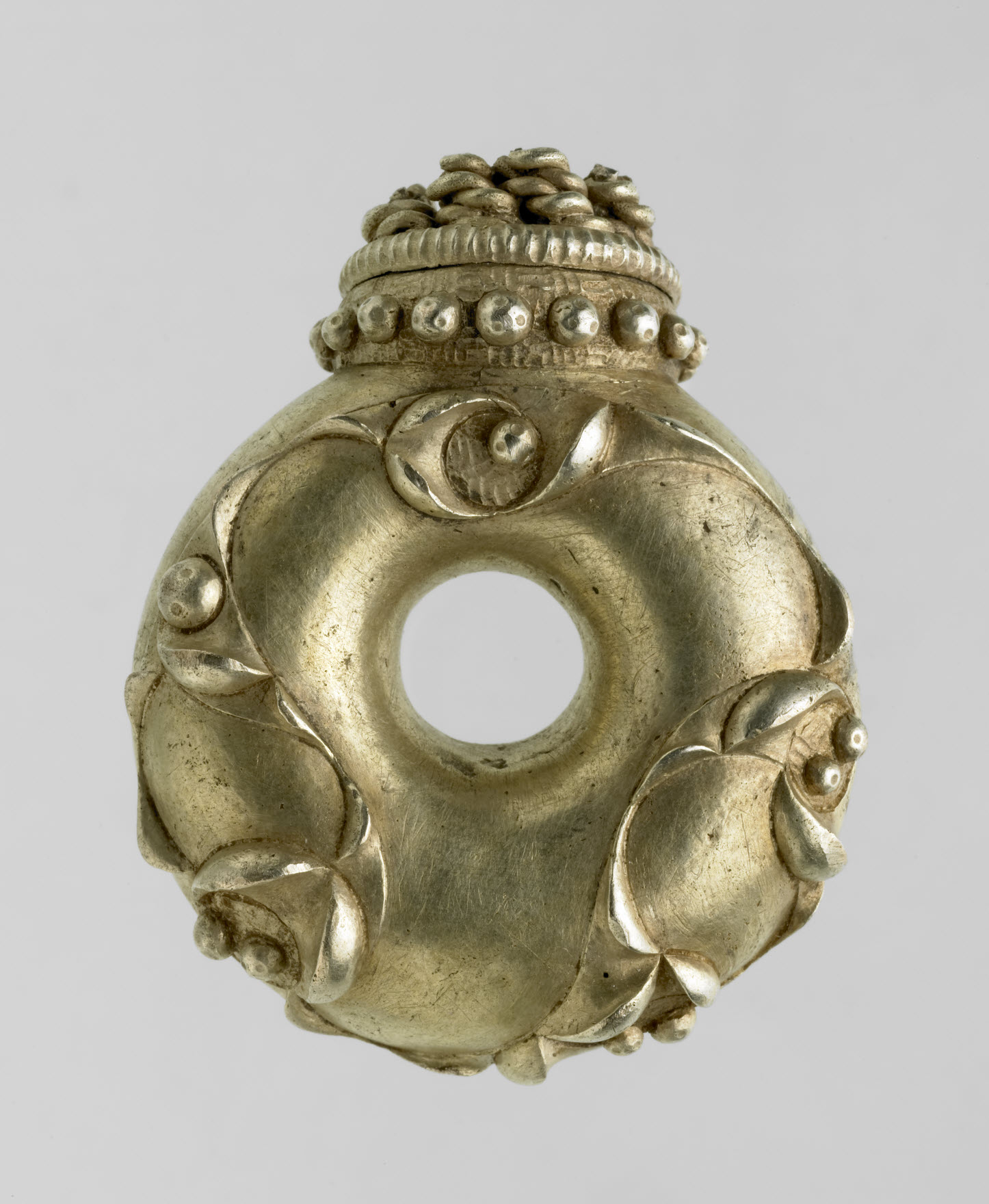

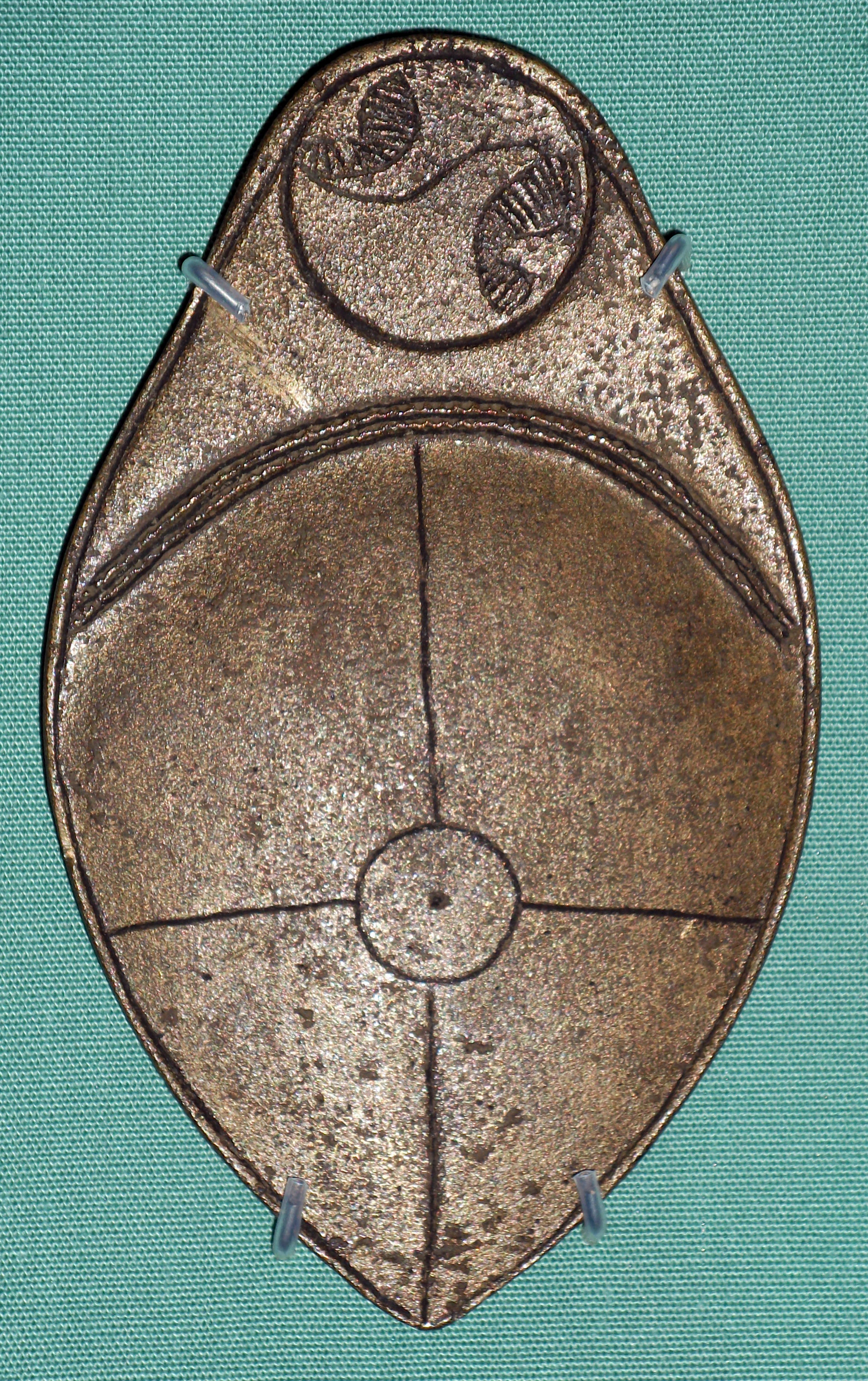

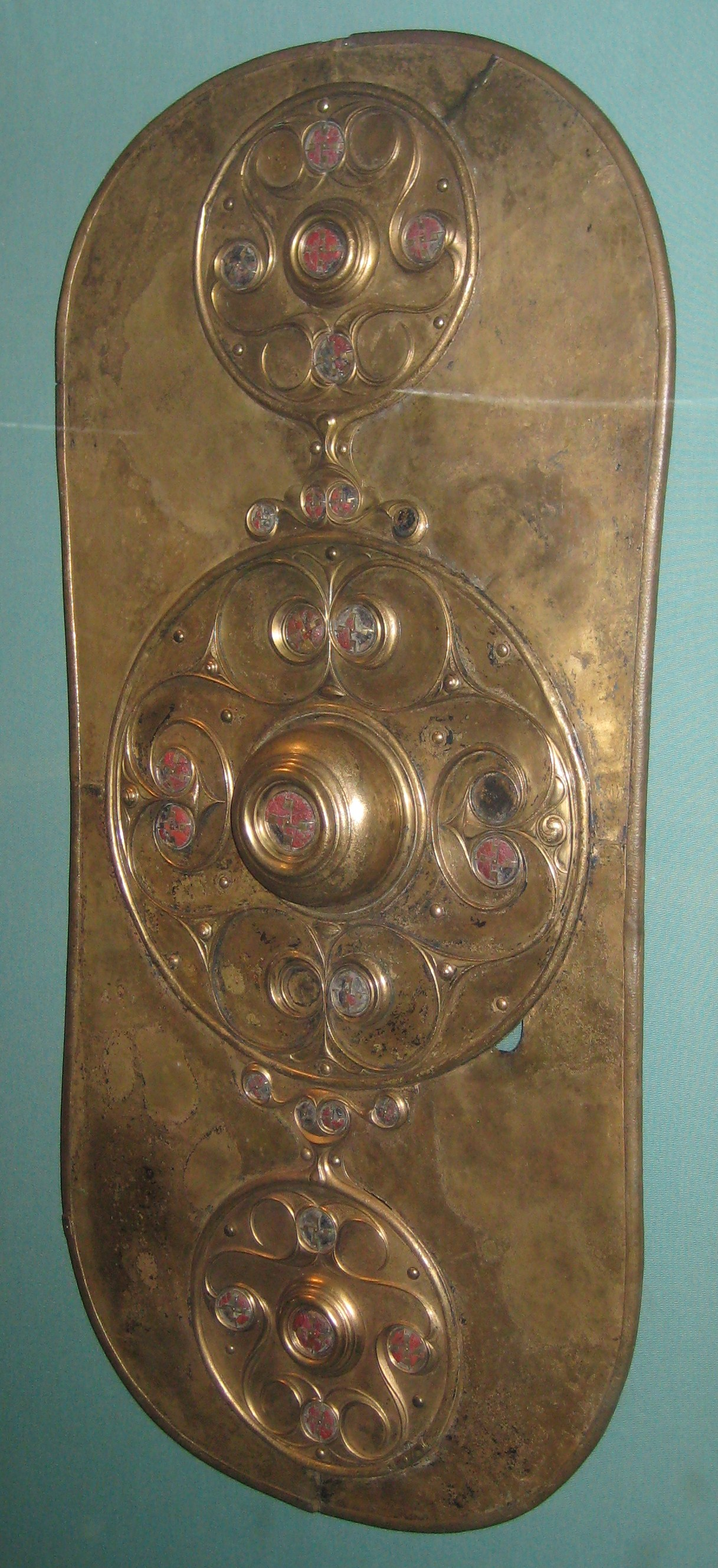

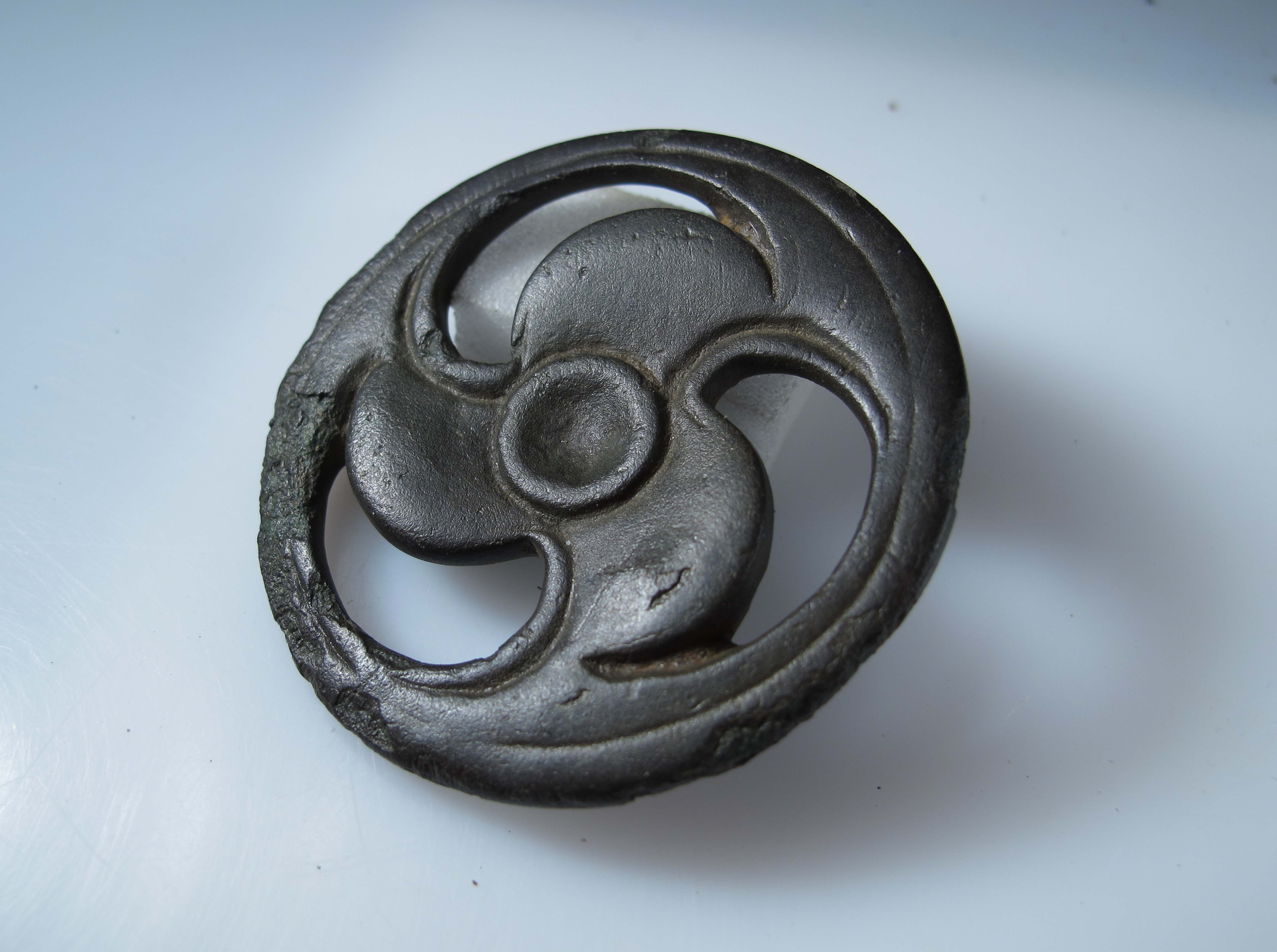

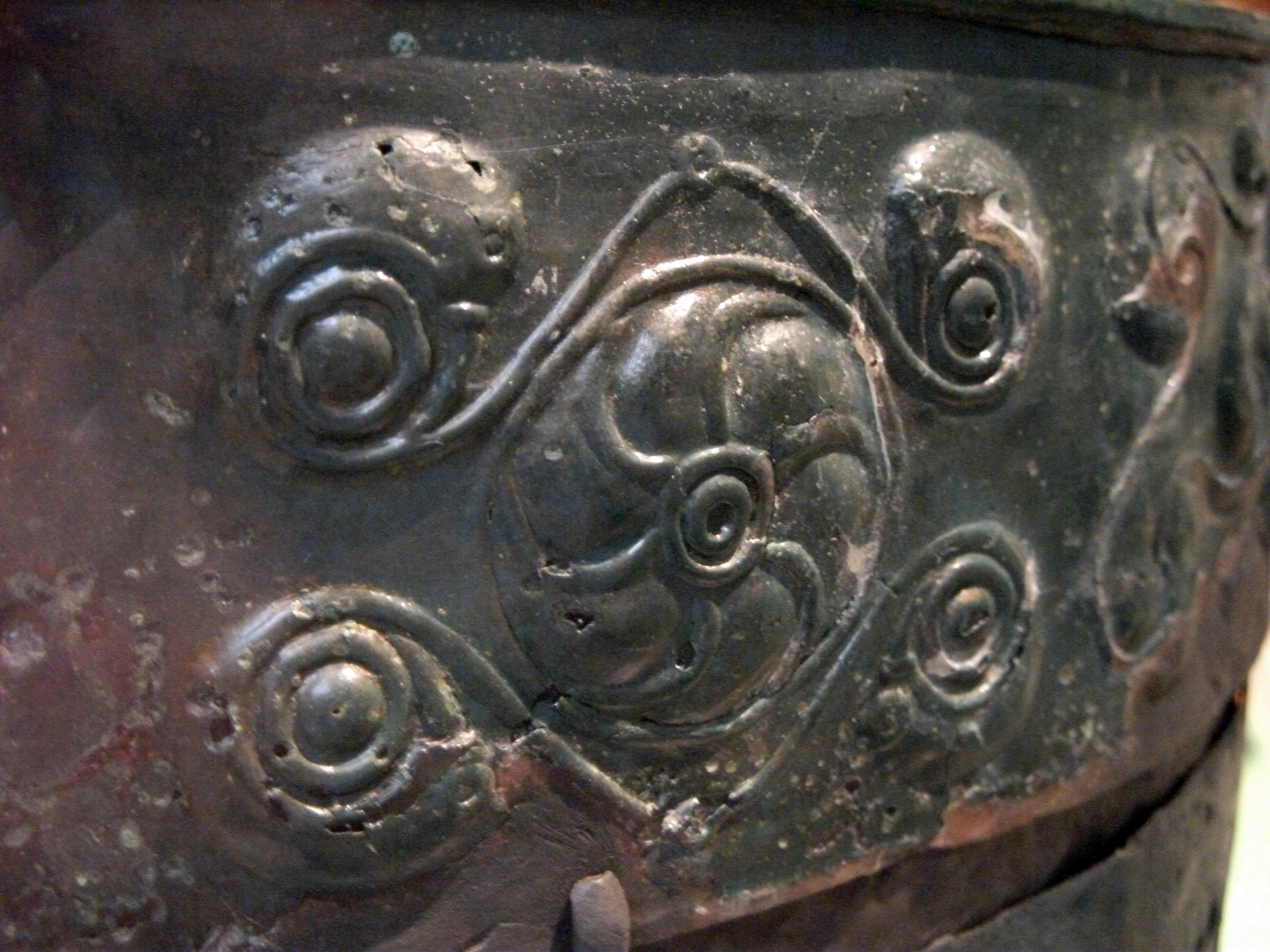

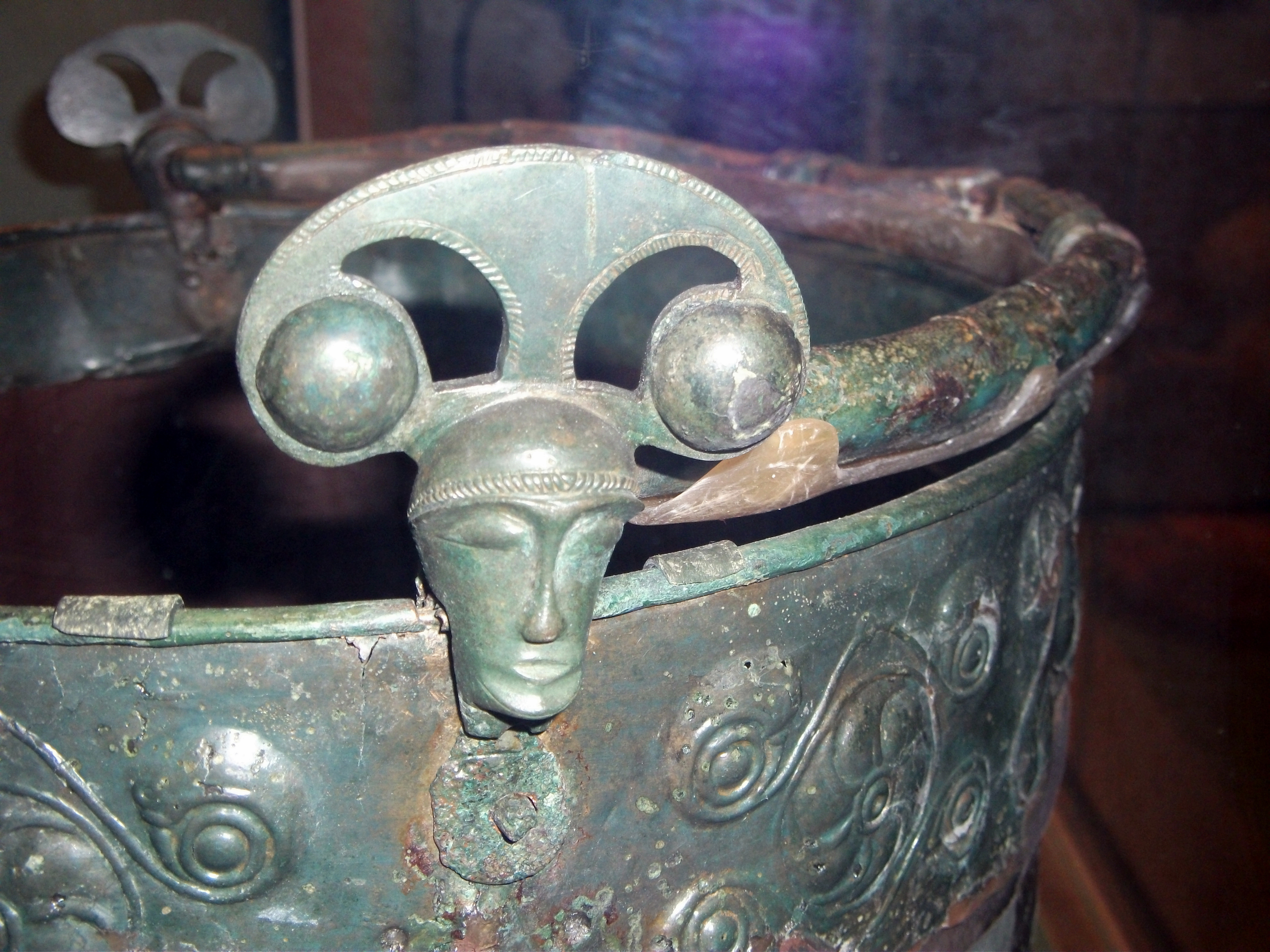

== Economy of Iron Age Britain ==
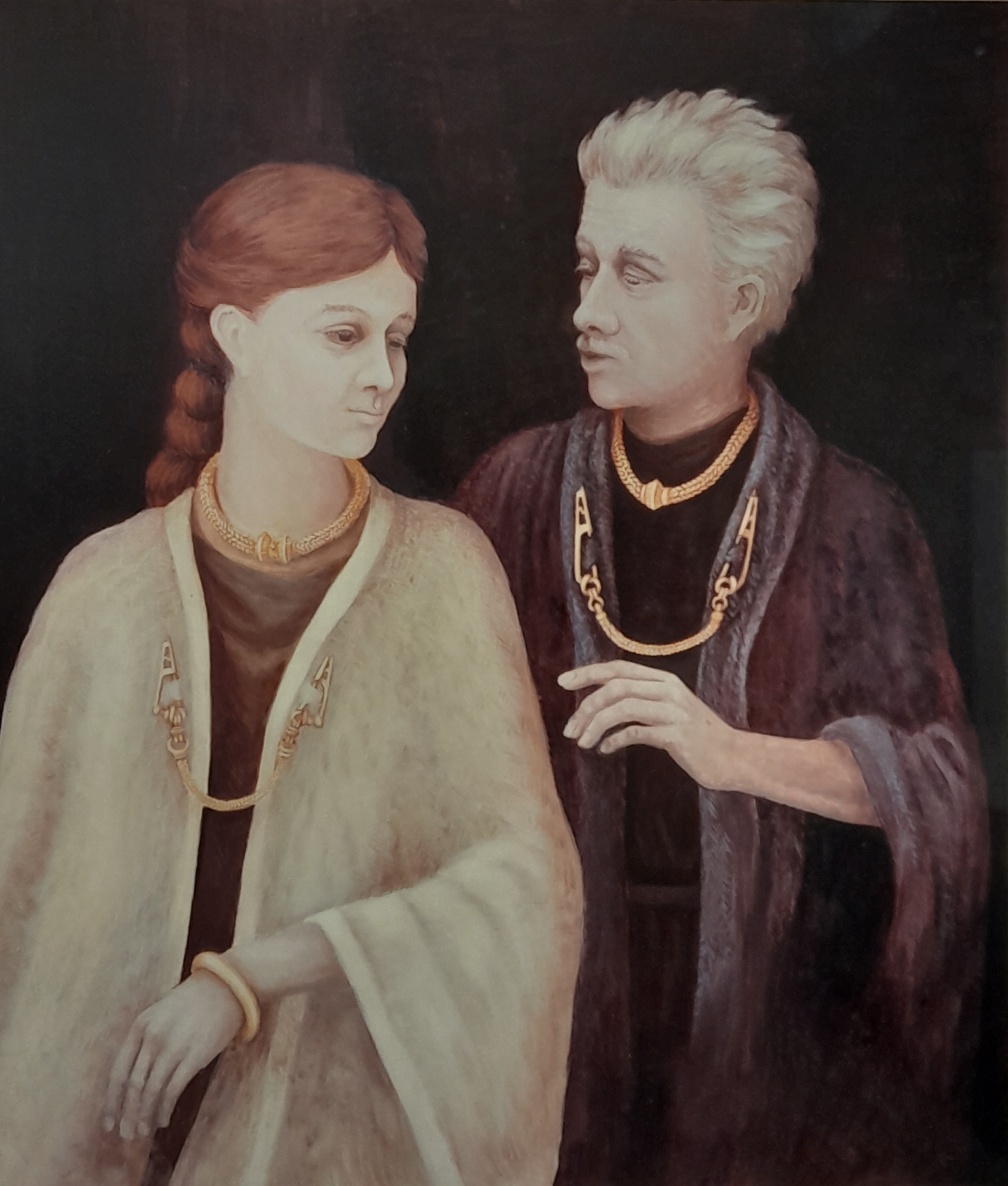
Illustration of an Iron Age British couple

Trade links developed in the Bronze Age and beforehand provided Great Britain with numerous examples of continental craftsmanship. Swords were imported, copied and often improved upon by the natives. Early in the period, Hallstatt slashing swords and daggers were a significant import, but by the mid-6th century, the volume of goods arriving seems to have declined, possibly from more profitable trade centres appearing in the Mediterranean. La Tène culture items (usually associated with the Celts) appeared in later centuries, and again, they were adopted and adapted with alacrity by the locals.

There also appears to have been a collapse in the bronze trade during the early Iron Age, which can be viewed in three ways:

1. Steady transition: the development of iron parallel to a diminishing bronze system.
2. Rapid abandonment; iron undermines bronze and takes over its social function.
3. Bronze crisis: severe reduction in the supply of bronze allows the iron to replace it.

Cattle represented a significant investment in pre-Roman Britain, and were useful to provide milk, cheese and leather. In the later Iron Age, an apparent shift is visible, revealing a change in dominance from cattle rearing to that of sheep. Economically, sheep are significantly less labour-intensive, requiring fewer people per animal.

Cattle and sheep dominate the osteo-archaeological record, but evidence for pig, ox, dog and rarely chicken is widely represented. There is generally an absence from remains of hunted game and wild species as well as fresh and sea water species, even in coastal communities.

A key commodity of the Iron Age was salt, used for preservation and the supplementation of diet. Though difficult to find archaeologically, some evidence exists. Salterns, in which sea water was boiled to produce salt, are prevalent in the East Anglia fenlands. Additionally, Morris notes that some salt trading networks spanned over 75 km.

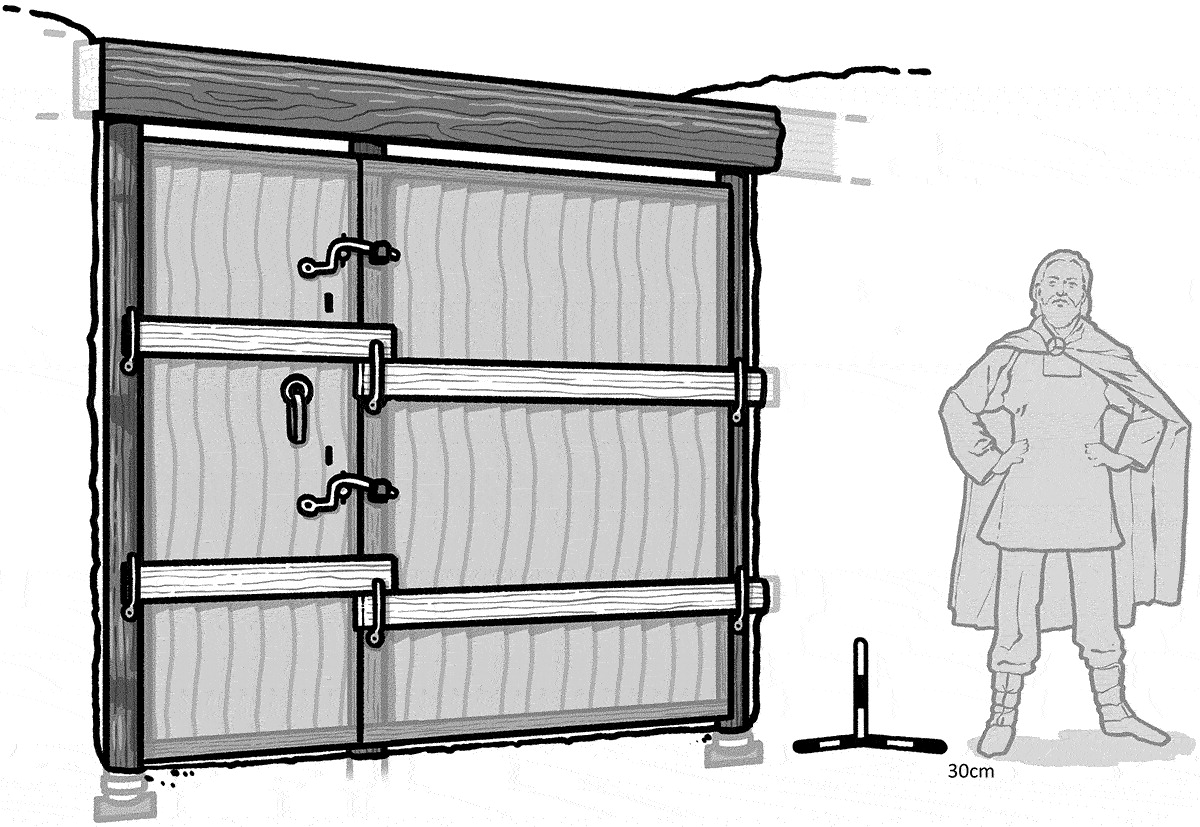
Reconstruction of a gate at Cadbury Castle hillfort, England

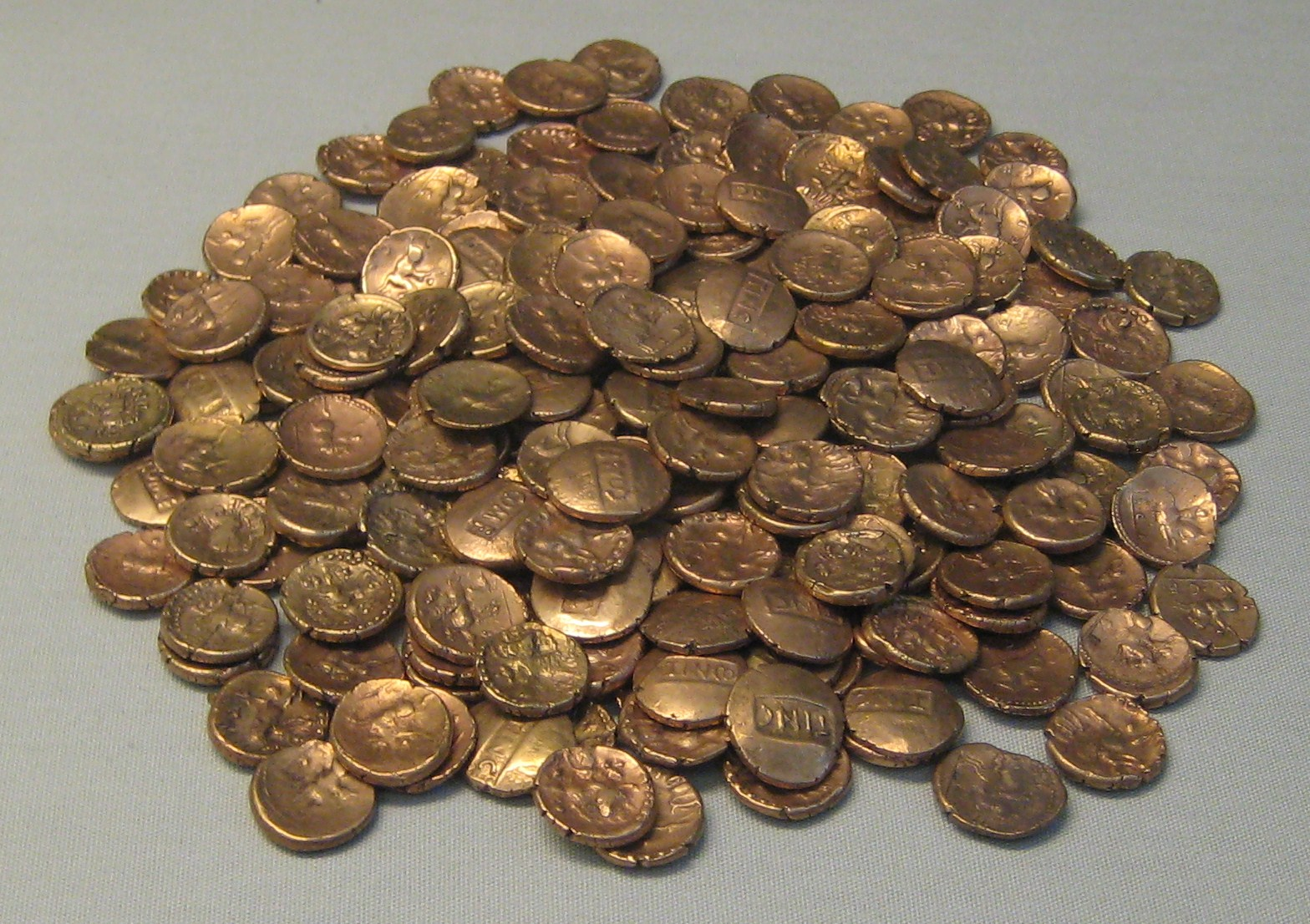
Hoard of British coins

The vast number of Iron Age coins found in Great Britain are of great archaeological value. Some, such as gold staters, were imported from Continental Europe. Others, such as the cast bronze (potin) coins of Southeast England, are clearly influenced by Roman originals. British tribal kings also adopted the continental habit of putting their names on the coins they had minted, with such examples as Tasciovanus from Verulamium and Cunobelinos from Camulodunum identifying regional differentiation. Hoards of Iron Age coins include the Silsden Hoard in West Yorkshire found in 1998. A large collection of coins, known as the Hallaton Treasure, was found at a Late Iron Age shrine near Hallaton, Leicestershire, in 2000 and consisted of 5,294 coins, mostly attributed to the Corieltavi tribe. These were buried in 14 separate hoards over several decades in the early 1st century AD.

The expansion of the economy throughout the period, but especially in the later Iron Age, is in large part a reflection of key changes in the expression of social and economic status.

=== Trade ===
==== Early and Middle Iron Age ====
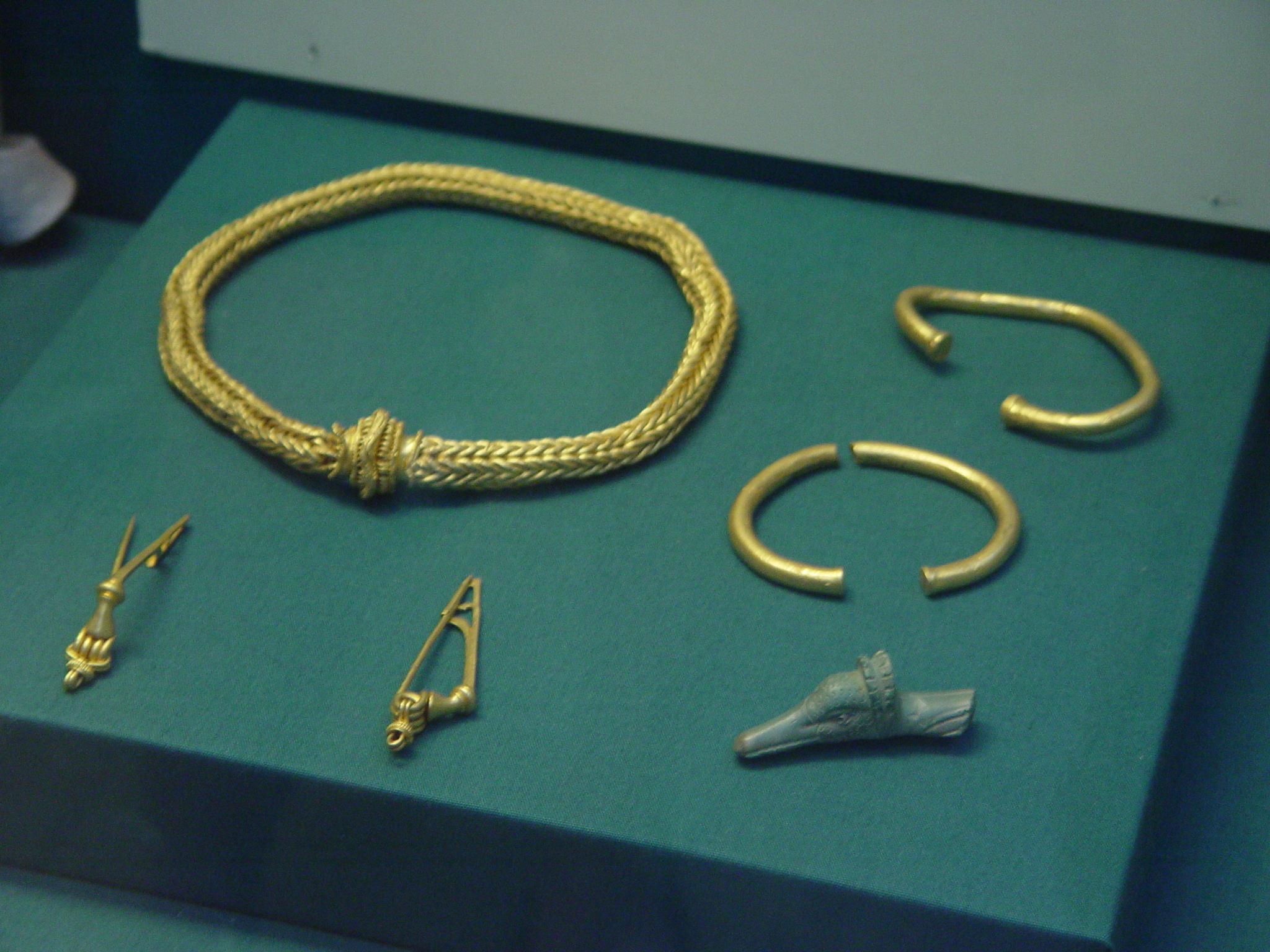
Precious metallic neck and arm bands from the Winchester Hoard

The Early Iron Age saw a substantial number of goods belonging to the Hallstatt culture imported from the continent, and they came to have a major effect on Middle Iron Age native art.

==== Late Iron Age ====
From the late 2nd century BC onwards, South-Central Britain was indirectly linked into Roman trading networks via Brittany and the Atlantic seaways to south-western Gaul. Hengistbury Head in Dorset was the most important trading site, and large quantities of wine amphorae have been found there. These Atlantic trade networks were heavily disrupted following Julius Caesar's failed conquest of Brittany in the 50s BC. This fact may support a supposition that the Celts of Britain had an economic interest in supporting their Gallic brethren in their resistance to Roman occupation.

In South-eastern Britain, meanwhile, extensive contact with the 'Belgic' tribes of northern Gaul is evidenced by large numbers of imported Gallo-Belgic gold coins between the mid-2nd century BC and Caesar's conquest of Gaul in the 50s BC. Those coins probably did not principally move through trade. In the past, the emigration of Belgic peoples to South-Eastern Britain has been cited as an explanation for their appearance in that region. However, recent work suggests that their presence there may have occurred from a kind of political and social patronage that was paid by the northern Gaulish groups in exchange for obtaining aid from their British counterparts in their warfare with the Romans on the Continent.

After Caesar's conquest of Gaul, a thriving trade developed between South-Eastern Britain and the near Continent. That is archaeologically evidenced by imports of wine and olive oil amphorae and mass-produced Gallo-Belgic pottery. Strabo, writing in the early 1st century AD, lists ivory chains and necklaces, amber gems, glass vessels and other petty wares as articles exported to Britain, and he recorded the island's exports as grain, cattle, gold, silver, iron, hides, slaves and hunting dogs. That trade probably thrived as a result of political links and client kingship relationships that developed between groups in South-Eastern Britain and the Roman world.

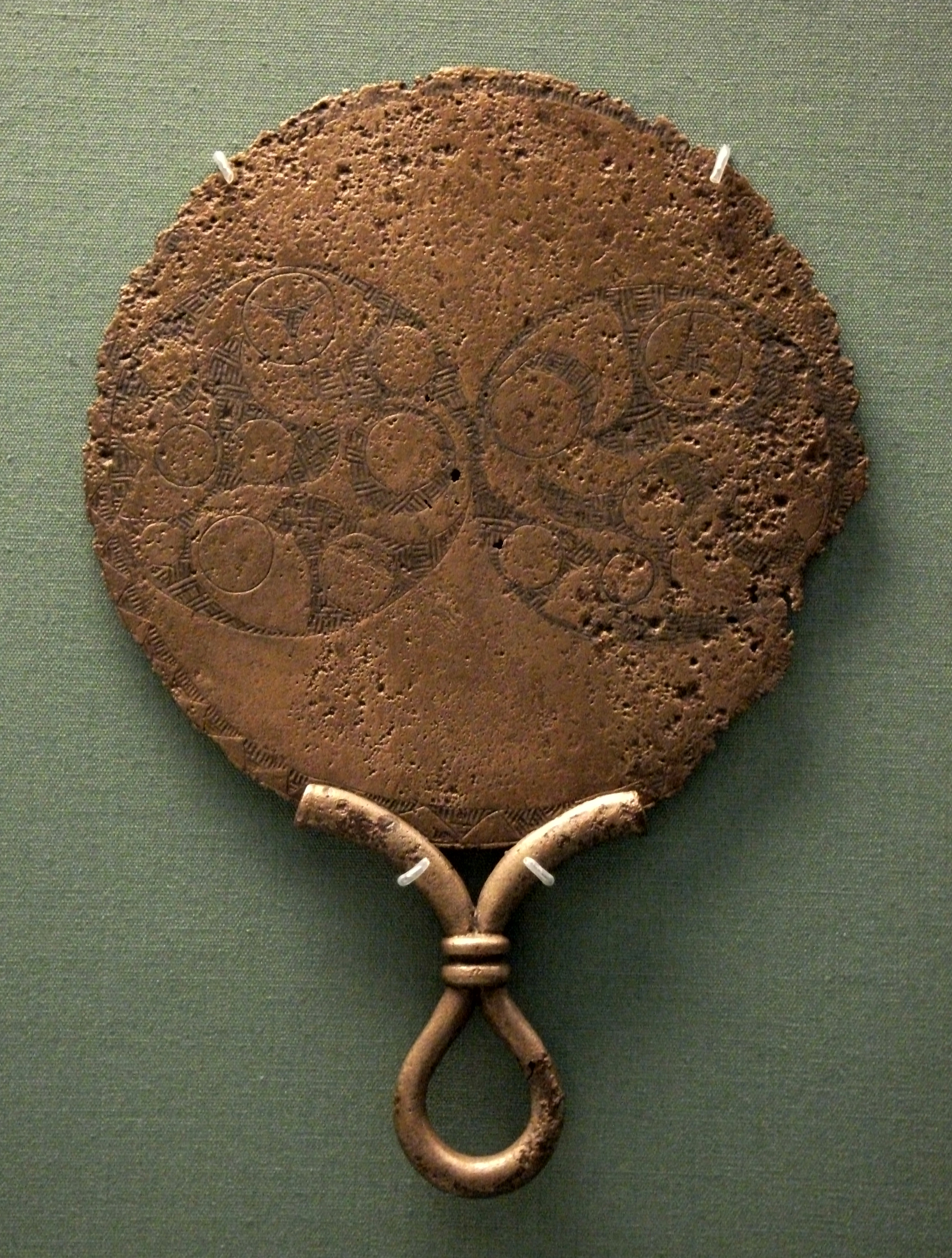
Bronze mirror found in Keverne, Cornwall

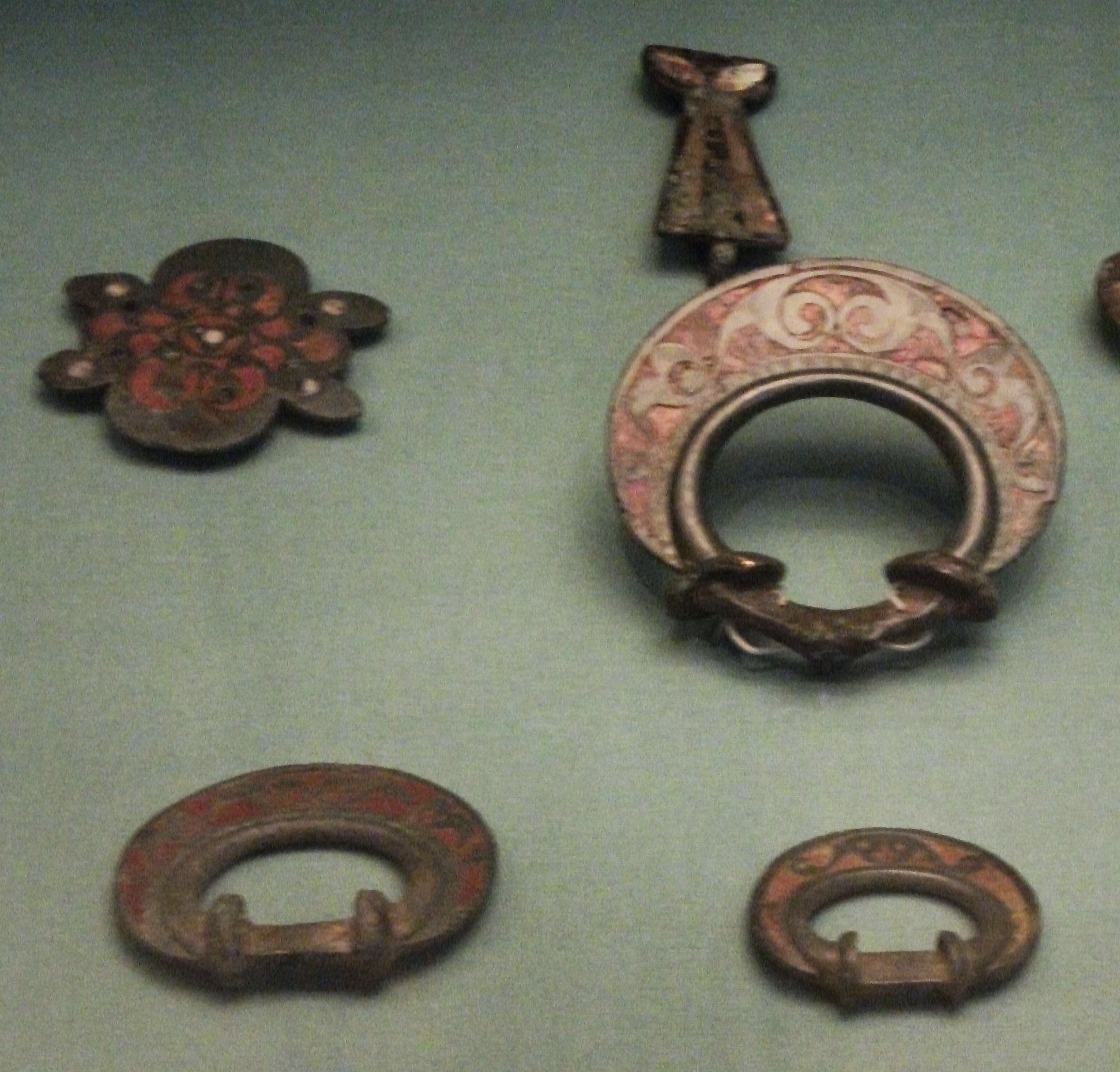

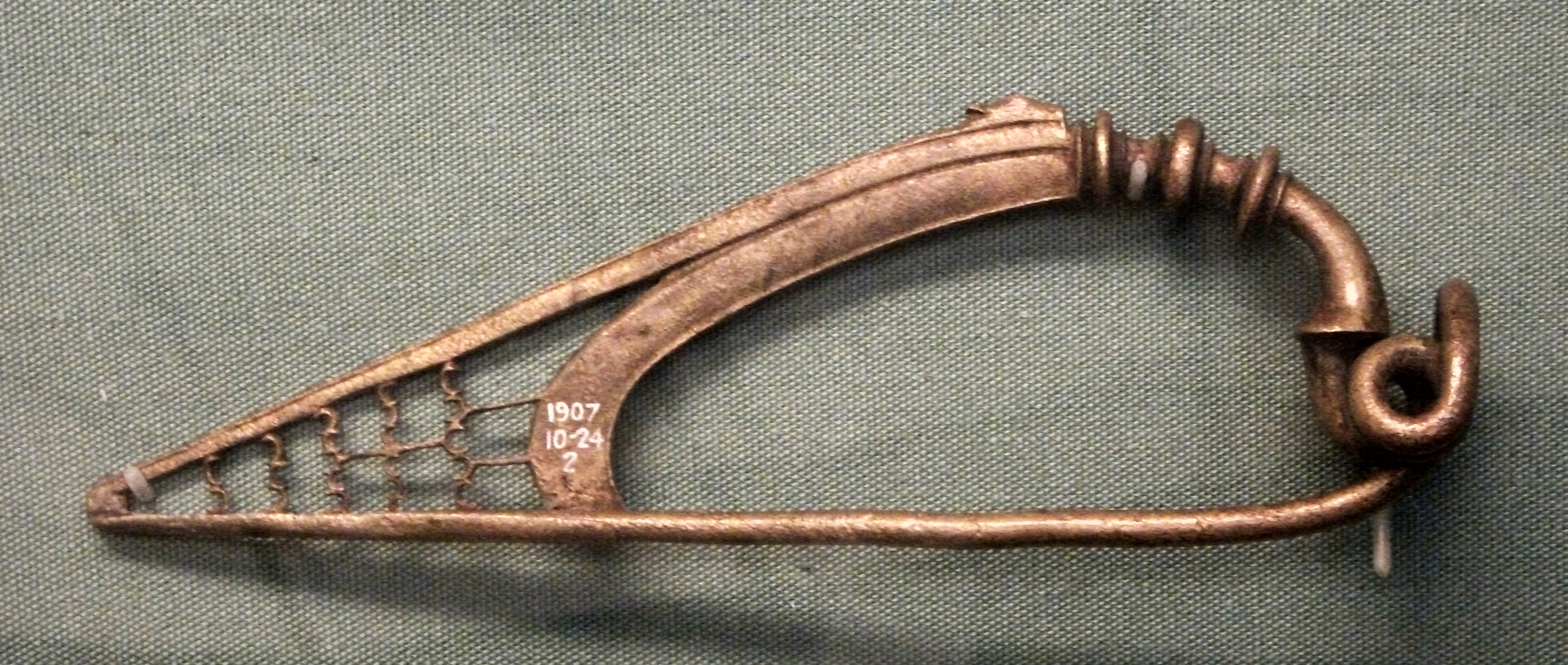
La Tene brooch

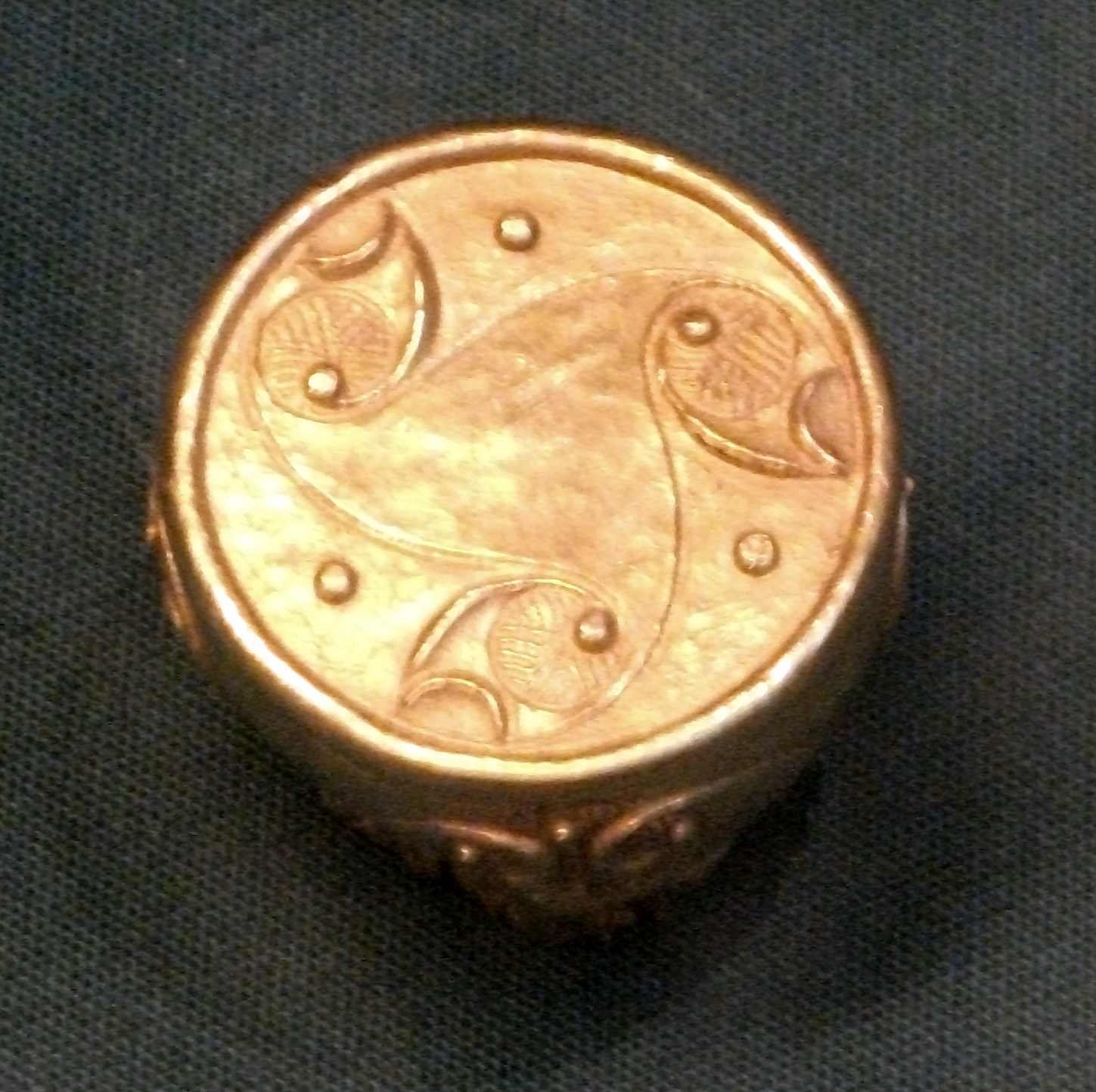
Dowel butt terminal

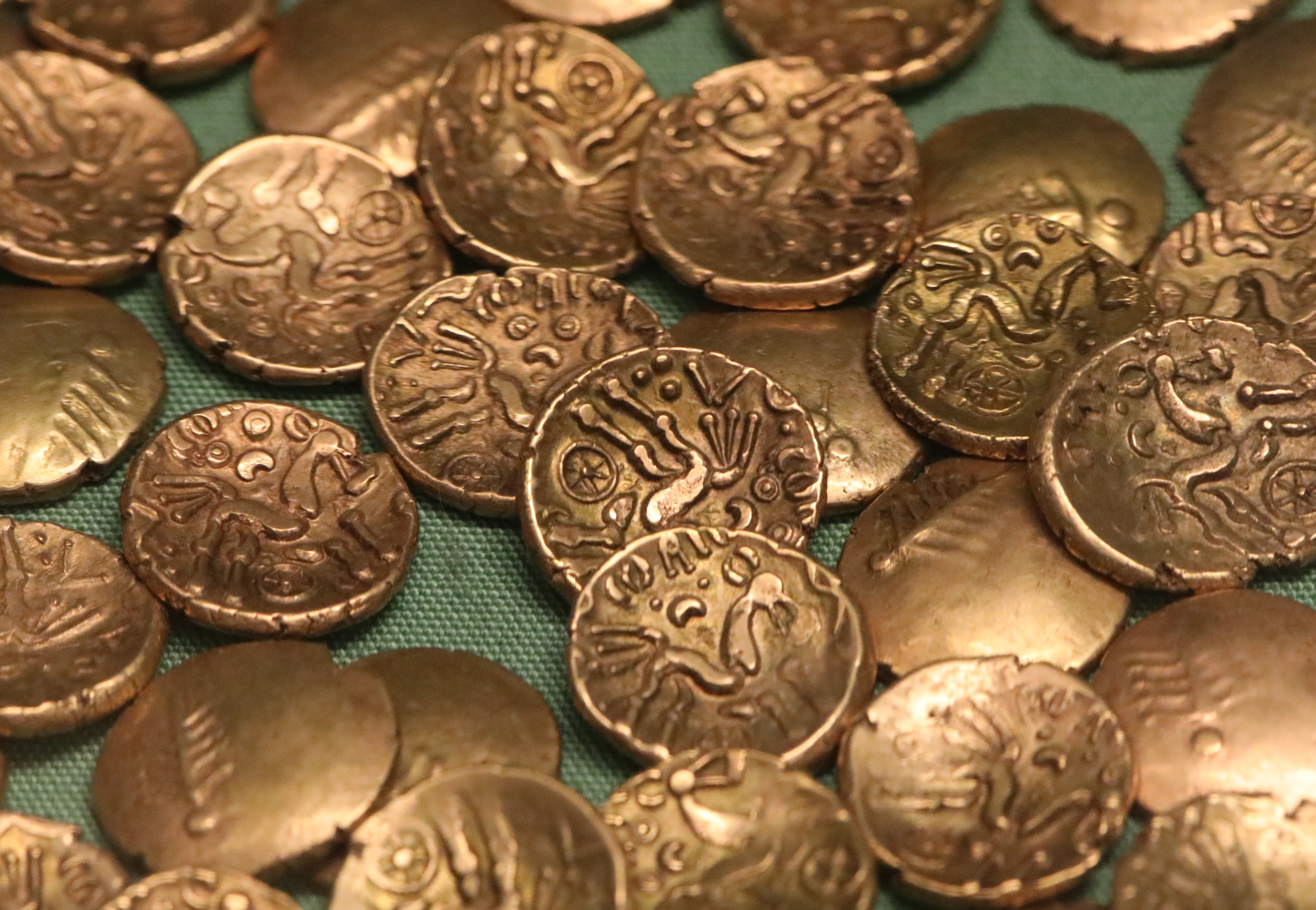
Farmborough Hoard

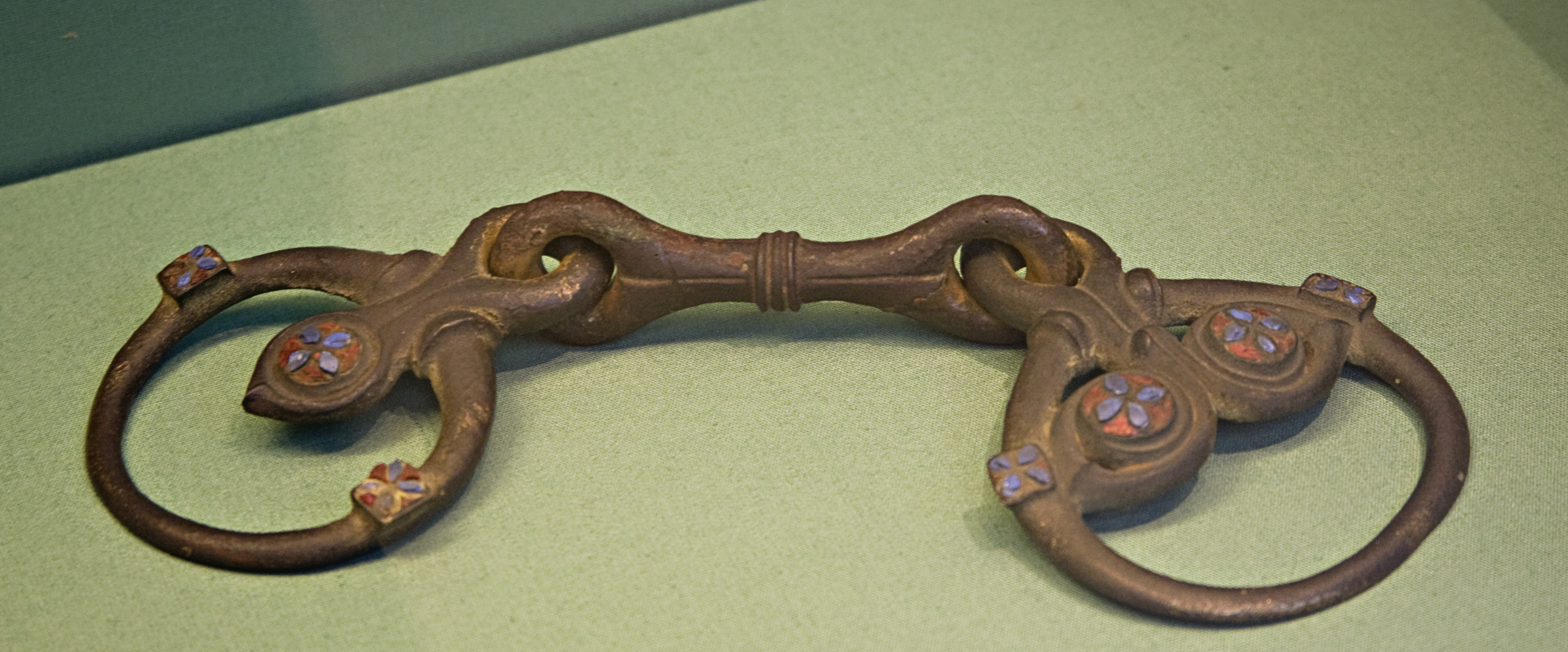
Snaffle bit

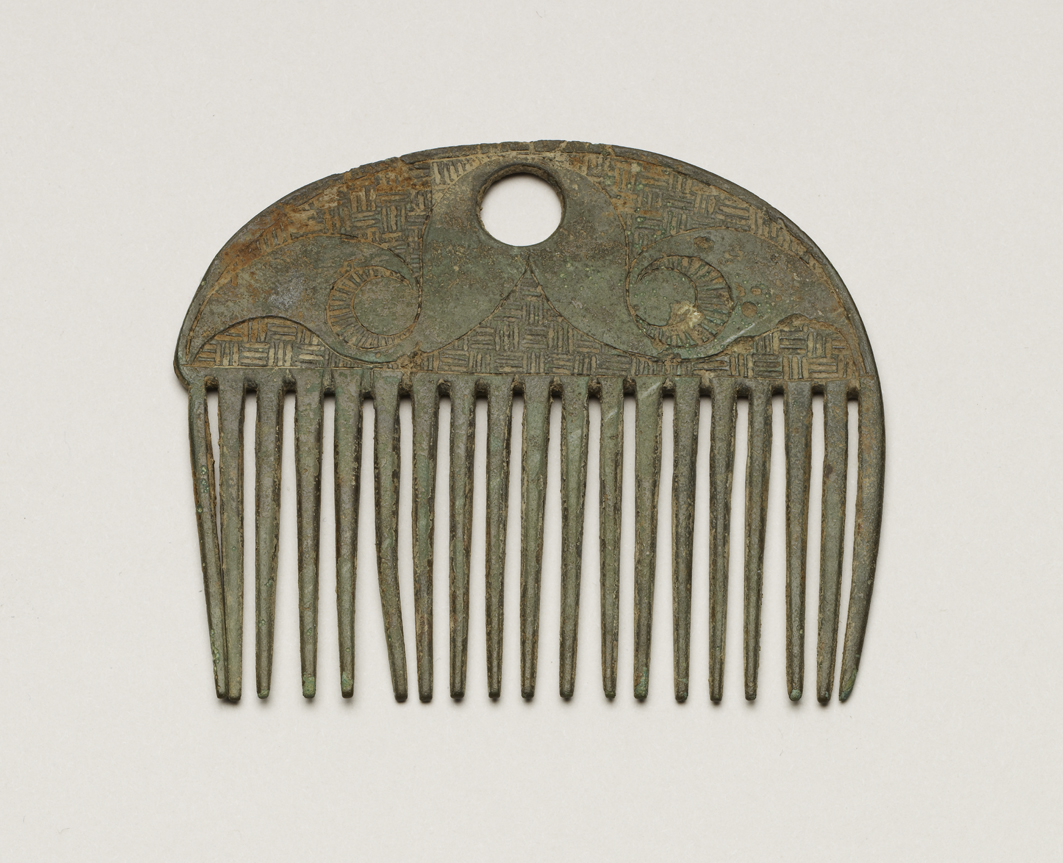
Bronze comb

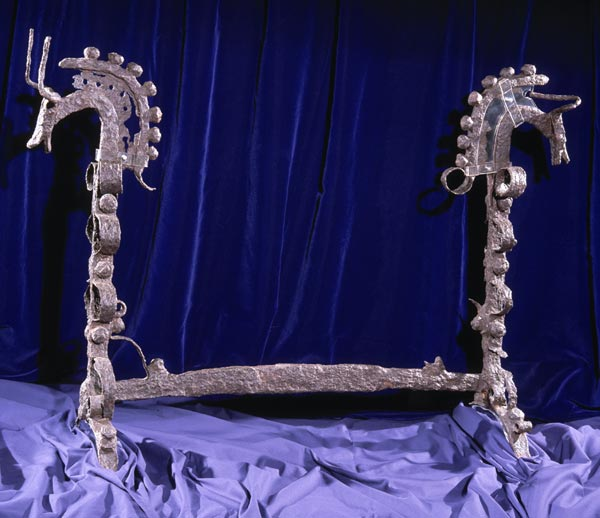
Capel Garmon Firedog

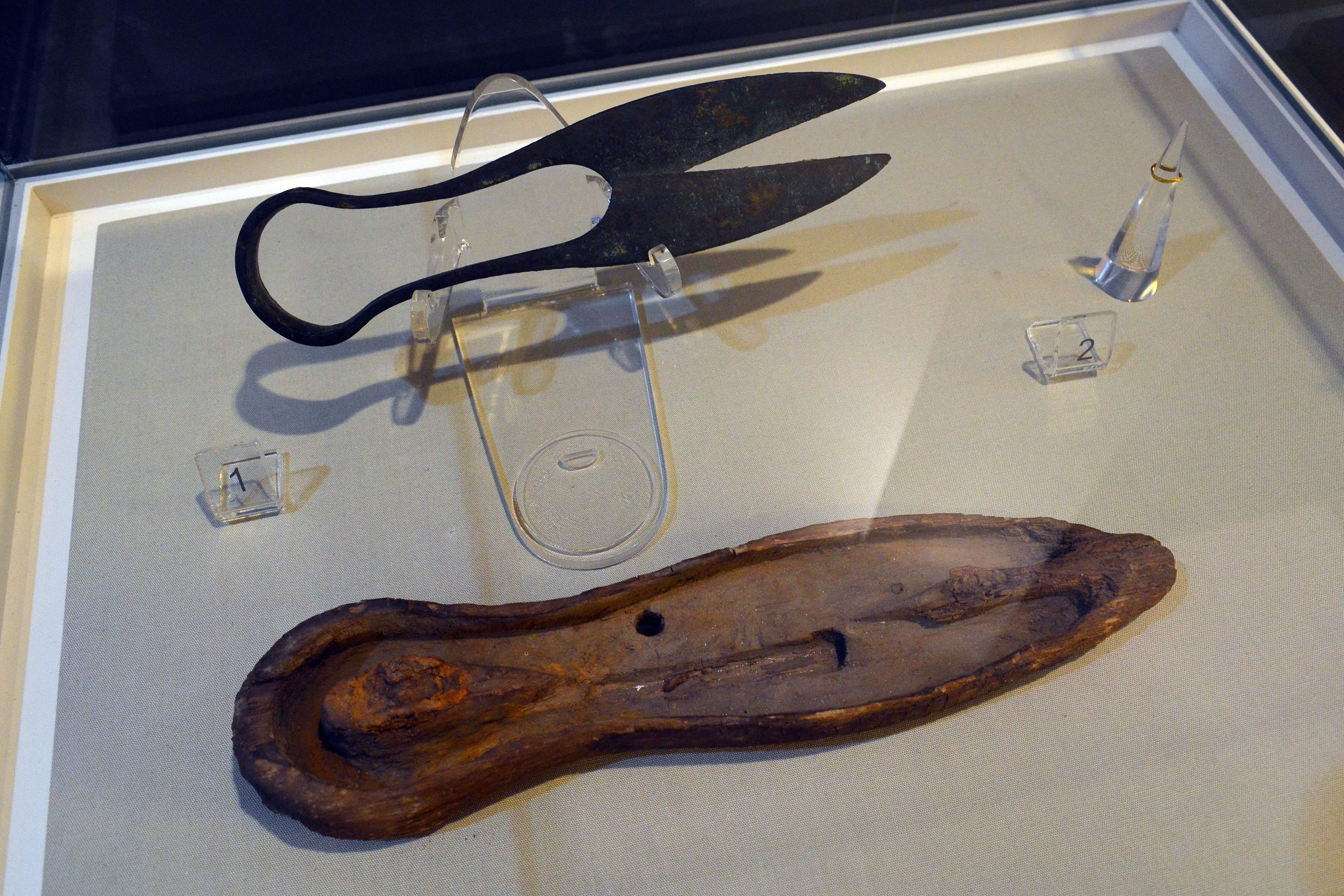
Shears and their wooden box, Must Farm, Peterborough Museum

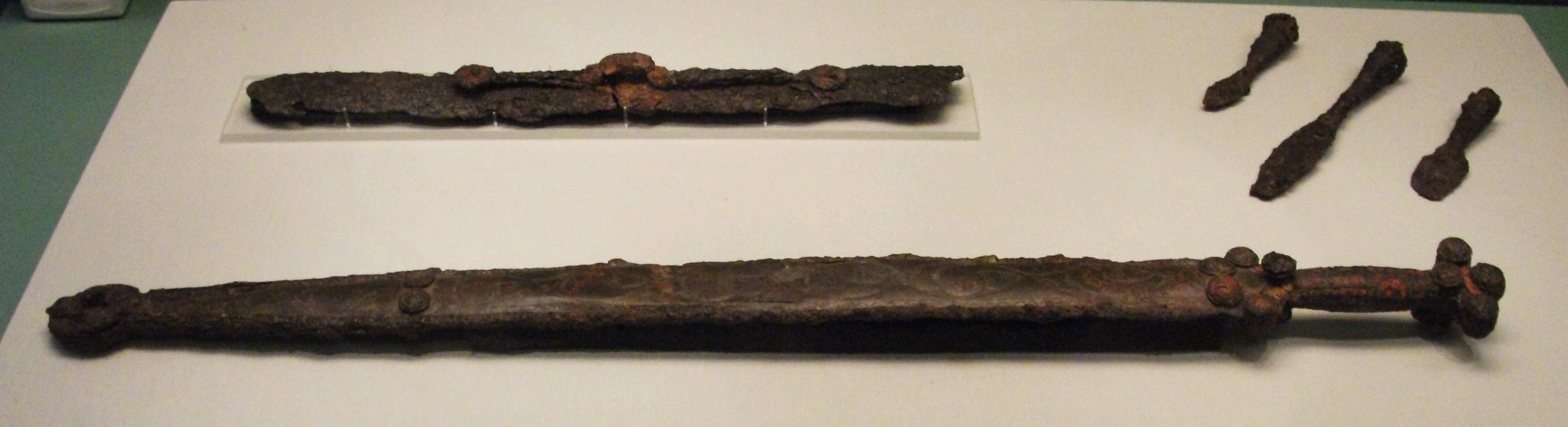
Celtic sword and scabbard

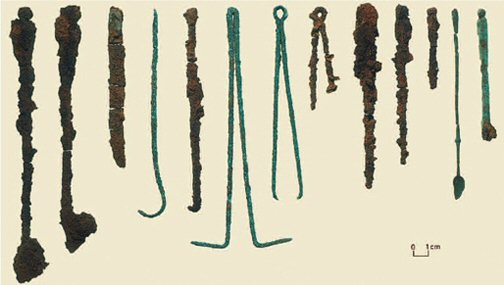
Druid of Colchester surgical tools

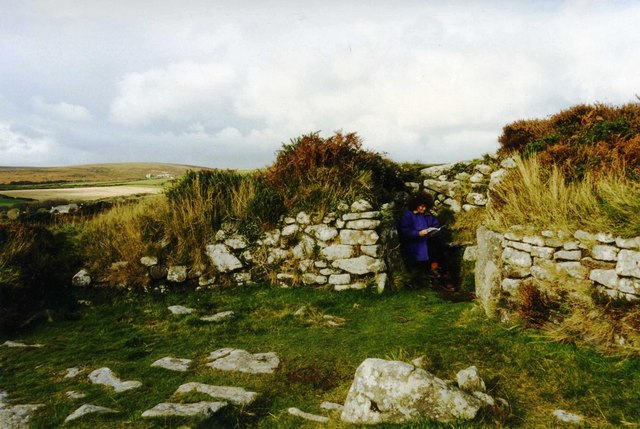
Remains of an Iron Age village at Chysauster, Cornwall

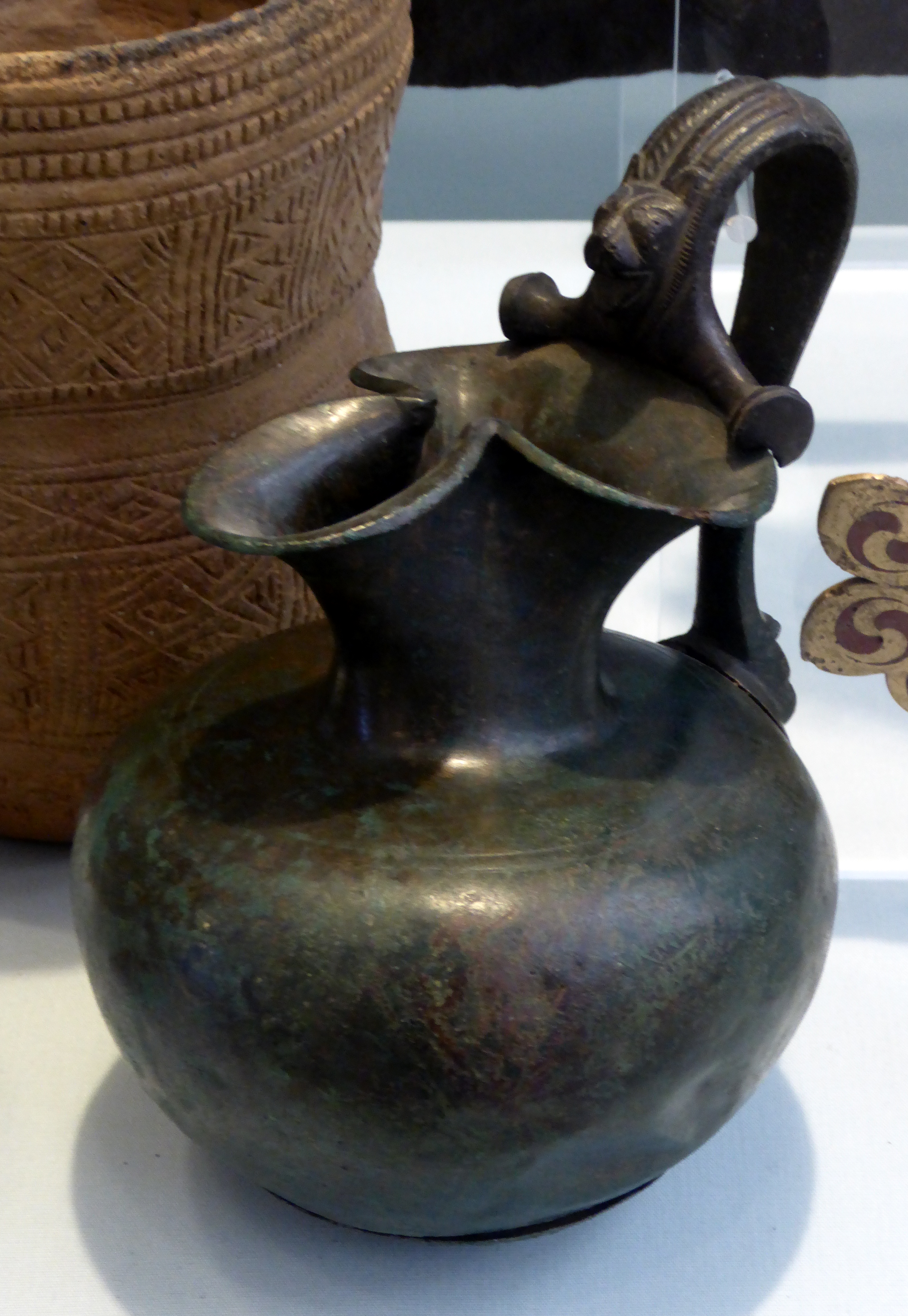
Iron Age Beaker

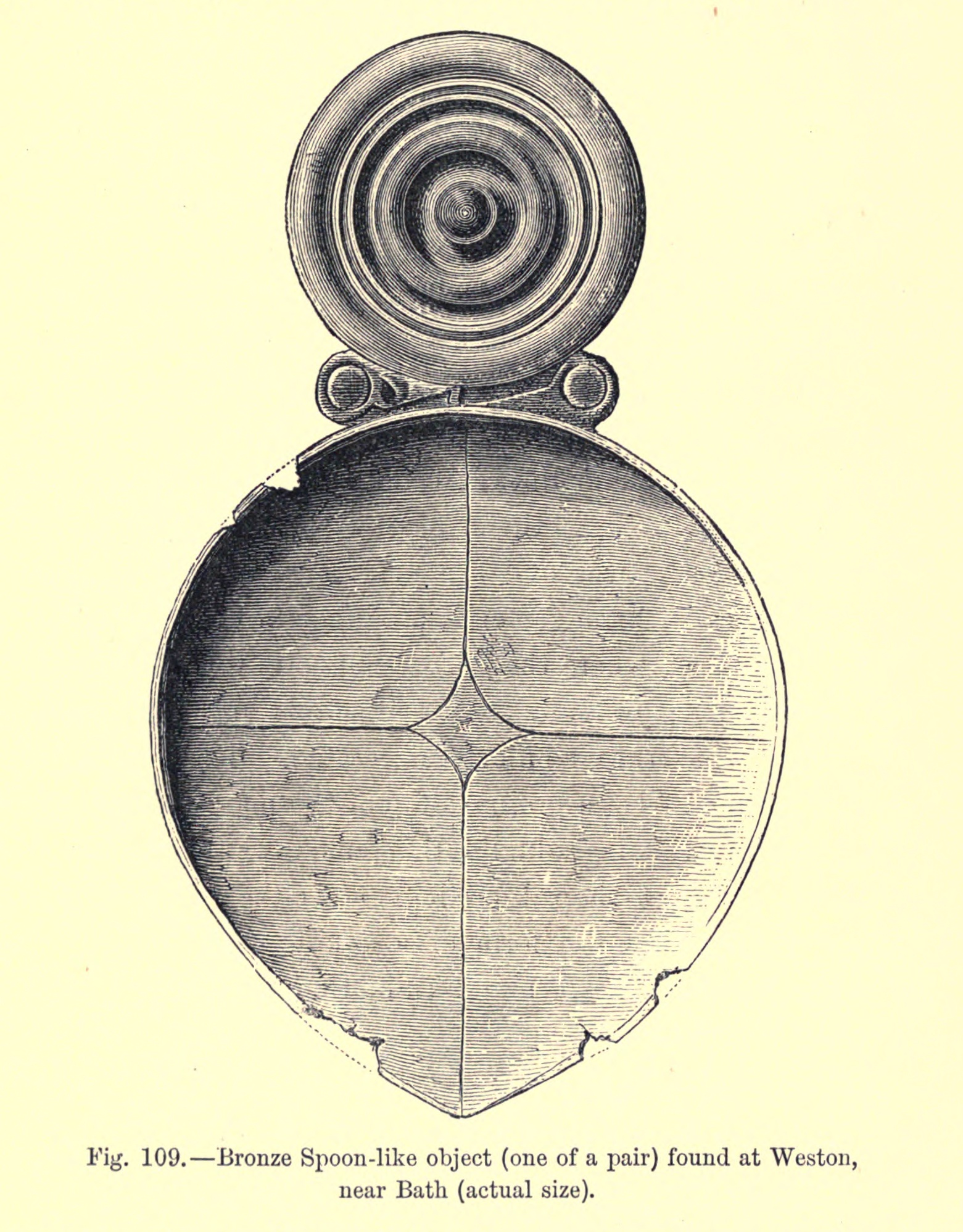
Bronze spoon-like object

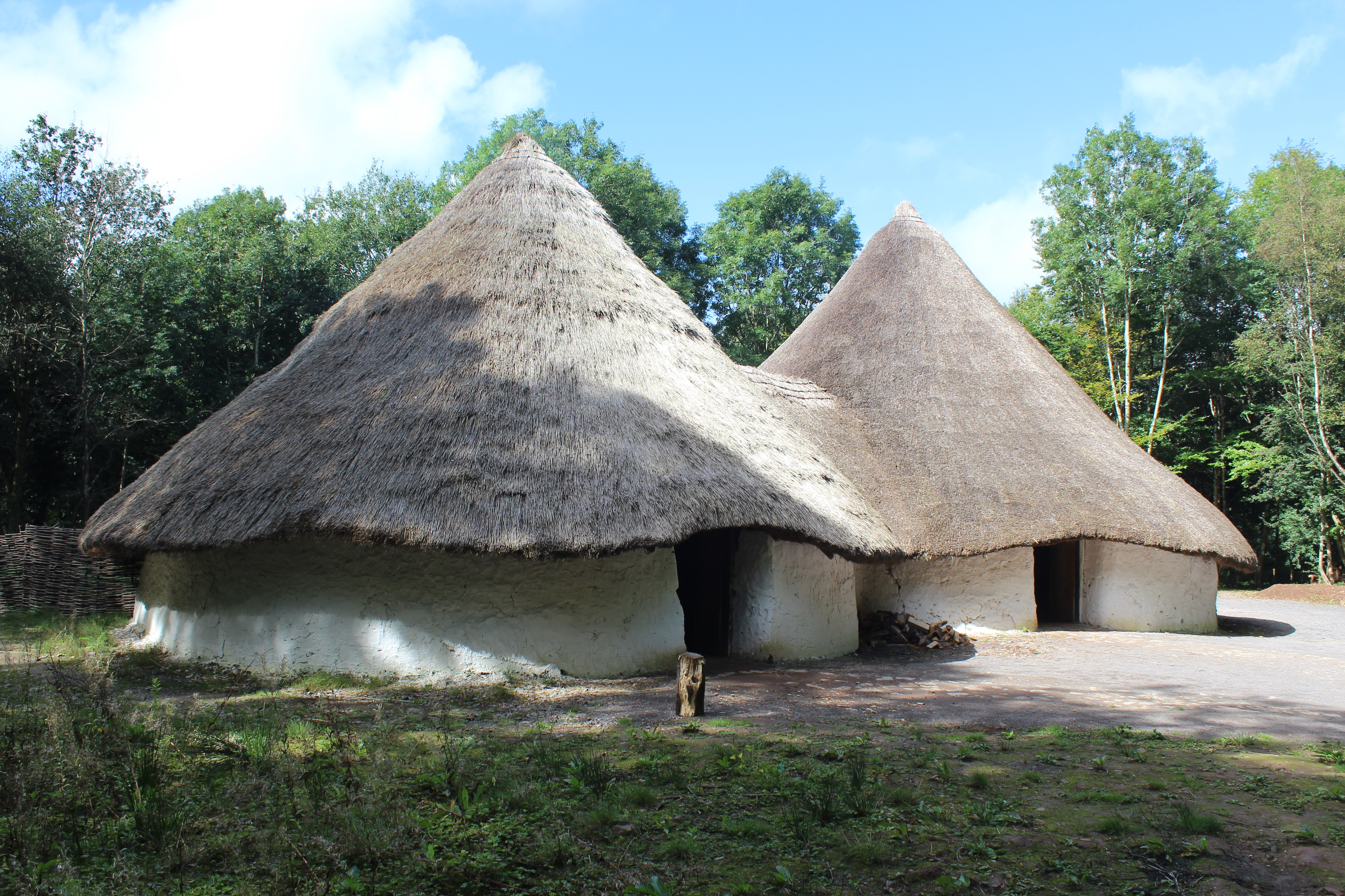
Bryn Eryr farmstead reconstruction

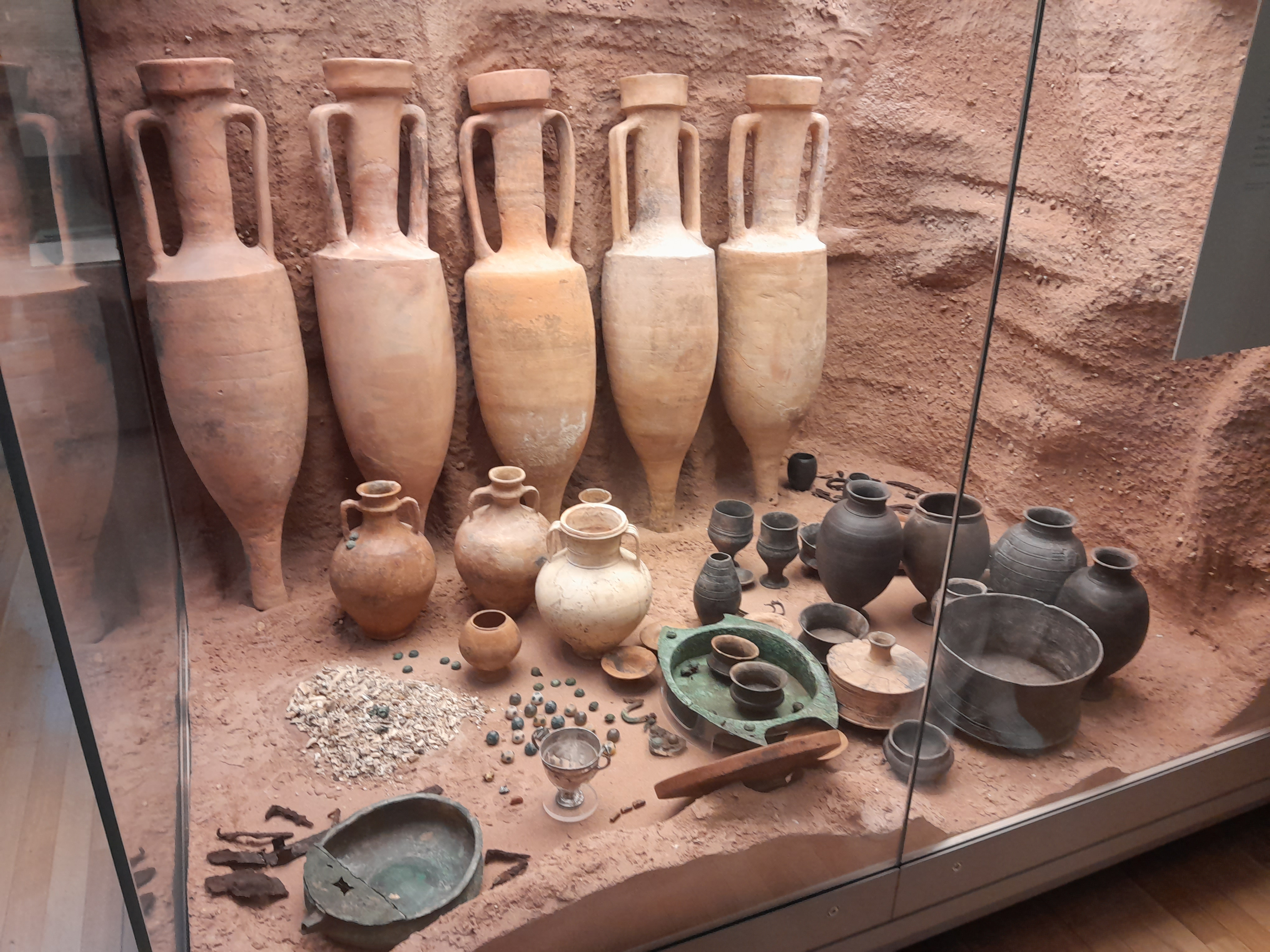
Imported goods

== End of Iron Age in Britain ==
The Iron Age in Southern Great Britain ended with the Roman invasion. Although the assimilation of Briton culture was far from instantaneous, some relatively-quick change is evident archaeologically. For example, the Romano-Celtic shrine in Hayling Island, Hampshire was constructed in the AD 60 to 70s, and on top of an Iron Age ritual site. Agricola was then still campaigning in Northern Britain (mostly in what is now Scotland). Rectilinear stone structures, indicative of a change in housing to the Roman style are visible from the mid-to-late 1st century AD at Brixworth and Quinton.

In areas where Roman rule was not strong or non-existent, Iron Age beliefs and practices remained but not without at least marginal levels of Roman or Romano-British influence. The survival of place names, such as Camulodunum (Colchester), which derive from the native language, is evidence of that.

== See also ==
- Iron Age tribes in Britain
- Pytheas

== Bibliography ==
- Cunliffe, B. W. (1988). Greeks, Romans and Barbarians. London.
- Cunliffe, B. W.; de Jersey, P. (1997). Armorica and Britain: Cross-Channel Relationships in the Late First Millennium BC. Oxford.
- Cunliffe, Barry W. (2005). Iron Age Communities in Britain: An Account of England, Scotland and Wales from the Seventh Century BC Until the Roman Conquest (4th ed.). Routledge. ISBN 0-415-34779-3.
- Cunliffe, B. W. (2009). Clark, P. (ed.). Looking forward: maritime contacts in the first millennium BC. Oxford: Oxbow.
- Fitzpatrick, Andrew P (1996). "'Celtic' Iron Age Europe: the theoretical basis". In Graves-Brown, Paul; Jones, Siân; Gamble, Clive (eds.). Cultural Identity and Archaeology: The Construction of European Communities. Routledge. pp. 238–255. ISBN 978-0-415-10676-4.
- Map of Southern Britain in the Iron Age. Chessington, Surrey, UK: Ordnance Survey. 1962.
- Rhys, J. (1904). Celtic Britain: Third Edition Revised. London: Society for Promoting Christian Knowledge. Downloadable Internet Archive.
