= List of Iron Age hoards in Great Britain =

The list of Iron Age hoards in Britain comprises significant archaeological hoards of coins, jewellery, precious and scrap metal objects and other valuable items discovered in Great Britain (England, Scotland and Wales) that are associated with the British Iron Age, approximately 8th century BC to the 1st century AD. It includes both hoards that were buried with the intention of retrieval at a later date (personal hoards, founder's hoards, merchant's hoards, and hoards of loot), and also hoards of votive offerings which were not intended to be recovered at a later date, but excludes grave goods and single items found in isolation. Hoards of Celtic coins dating from the time of the Roman occupation of Britain are also included here.

== List of hoards ==
| Hoard | Image | Date | Place of discovery | Year of discovery | Current Location | Contents |
|---|---|---|---|---|---|---|
| Alton Hoard | Coins from the Alton A hoard | mid 1st century AD | Alton, Hampshire; 51.149°N 0.977°W | 1996 | British Museum, London | 50 gold staters of Commios, Tincomarus and Epillus (Hoard A); 206 gold staters of Tincomarus and Verica (Hoard B); 1 Roman gold ring 1 Roman gold bracelet |
| Beaminster Hoard | | early 1st century | Beaminster, Dorset; 50.809°N 2.740°W | 2003 | Dorset Museum, Dorchester | 160 silver staters |
| Beverley Hoard | Coins from the Beverley Hoard | mid 1st century BC | Beverley, East Yorkshire; 53.845°N 0.427°W | 1999–2007 | Hull Museums Collections; British Museum, London | 110 gold staters |
| Blythburgh Hoard | | early 1st century AD | Blythburgh, Suffolk; 52.32°N 1.60°E | 2019 | | 19 gold staters and quarter staters of Addedomaros, king of the Trinovantes, dating to 45–25 BC |
| Cheriton Hoard | 9 gold coins from the Cheriton Hoard on display at Winchester City Museum | 80 to 60 BC | Cheriton, Hampshire; 51.05245°N 1.170325°W | 1984 | British Museum, London; Winchester City Museum | 50 gold staters and quarter staters |
| Chute Forest Hoard | | 80 to 60 BC | Chute Forest, Wiltshire; 51.265865°N 1.556348°W | 1927 | British Museum, London | 36 gold staters |
| Clacton Hoard | | 80 to 60 BC | Clacton-on-Sea, Essex; 51.79197°N 1.145973°E | 1898 | British Museum, London | 76 gold staters |
| Climping Hoard | | mid 1st century BC | Climping, West Sussex; 50.813°N 0.578°W | 2000 | British Museum, London | 18 gold staters (Note: A previously unknown type of stater was found which henceforth became known as the "Climping type". It is thought that there was more to the hoard, but it had become dispersed.) |
| Dovedale Hoard | | 1st century BC | Reynard's Cave and Kitchen, Dovedale, Derbyshire; 53.0696°N 1.7848°W | 2014 | Buxton Museum and Art Gallery | 26 gold and silver coins, including three pre-conquest Roman coins, and 20 Late Iron Age gold and silver coins belonging to the Corieltauvi tribe |
| Essendon Hoard | | 60 BC to 20 BC | Essendon, Hertfordshire; 51.762913°N 0.153169°W | 1992 | British Museum, London | 257 gold coins, 7 swords, 4 spearheads, a dagger and a decorated sheet of bronze that may have faced a wooden shield, various ingots and segments of a gold torc |
| Farmborough Hoard | Coins from the Farmborough Hoard | early 1st century | Farmborough, Somerset; 51.343°N 2.484°W | 1984 | British Museum, London | 61 gold staters |
| Field Baulk Hoard | | mid 1st century | Field Baulk, March, Cambridgeshire; 52.539°N 0.087°E | 1982 | British Museum, London | 872 silver coins minted by the Iceni tribe, in a round pot |
| Great Baddow Hoard | | 60-20BC | Great Baddow, Essex | 2020 | Museum of Chelmsford, Chelmsford | 935 gold staters |
| Great Leighs Hoard | | mid 1st century BC | Great Leighs, Essex; 51.827°N 0.506°E | 1998–1999 | Chelmsford Museum | 40 gold staters |
| Hallaton Treasure | Iron Age coins from the Hallaton Treasure | 1st century AD | Hallaton, Leicestershire; 52.550°N 0.8333°W | 2000 | Harborough Museum | 5,000 silver and gold coins a silver gilt Roman parade helmet jewellery |
| Honingham Hoard | | mid 1st century AD | Honingham, Norfolk; 52.663°N 1.108°E | 1954 | Norwich Castle Museum and Art Gallery | 341 Iceni silver coins |
| Ipswich Hoard | Two torcs from the Ipswich Hoard | 1st century BC | Ipswich, Suffolk; 52.059°N 1.156°E | 1968–1969 | British Museum, London | 6 gold twisted torcs |
| Kimbolton Hoard | | mid 1st century BC | Kimbolton, Cambridgeshire; 52.308°N 0.407°W | 2010 | | 67 gold staters and one gold quarter-stater |
| Langstone Hoard | Two bronze bowls and wine strainer from the Langstone Hoard | mid 1st century AD | Ringland, Newport; 51.610°N 2.898°W | 2007 | | 2 bronze bowls and a bronze wine strainer |
| Leekfrith torcs | The Leekfrith torcs on display at the Potteries Museum & Art Gallery in Hanley | 4th to mid 3rd century BC | Leekfrith, Staffordshire; 53.137°N 2.045°W | 2016 | | 4 gold torcs |
| Little Horwood Hoard | | 1st century BC | Little Horwood, Aylesbury Vale, Buckinghamshire; 51.968°N 0.850°W | 2006–2007 | Buckinghamshire County Museum, Aylesbury | 75 staters found over an 11-month period which are said to be part of the Whaddon Chase Hoard |
| Llangoed Hoard | | mid 1st century BC | Llangoed; Anglesey; 53.290°N 4.090°W | 2021–2022 | Oriel Ynys Môn | Fifteen gold staters of the Corieltauvi tribe |
| Llyn Cerrig Bach Hoard | "Crescentic bronze plaque" in the shape of a gold lunula, with triskele-like decoration | 4th century BC to 1st century AD | Llyn Cerrig Bach, near Valley, Anglesey; 53.259°N 4.540°W | 1942 | National Museum Cardiff | votive objects deposited over a period of several hundred years, comprising over 150 items of bronze and iron, including 7 swords, 6 spearheads, fragments of a shield, part of a bronze trumpet, 2 gang chains, fragments of iron wagon tyres and horse gear, blacksmith's tools, fragments of two cauldrons, and iron bars |
| Llyn Fawr Hoard | | 8th to 7th century BC | Llyn Fawr Lake, Rhigos, Glamorgan; 51.720°N 3.568°W | 1909–1913 | National Museum Cardiff | bronze cauldron, a number of chisels, sickles and socketed axes, a sword, a spearhead, a razor, and horse harness equipment |
| Lochar Moss Hoard | | 50 to 200 AD | Lochar Moss, near Dumfries, Dumfries and Galloway; 55.0858829°N 3.5806428°W | 1840s | British Museum, London | brass torc and bronze bowl |
| Melsonby Hoard | A strap junction from the hoard | 100BC to 50 AD | Melsonby, North Yorkshire, North Yorkshire | 2021 | Yorkshire Museum | nearly 900 metalwork objects, including wheels, horse-gear and decorative fittings. |
| North Foreland Hoard | | early 1st century BC | North Foreland, Kent; 51.375°N 1.445°E | 1999 | Powell-Cotton Museum, Birchington-on-Sea | 63 potin (a bronze alloy with high tin content) coins |
| Peatling Magna Hoard | | mid 1st century BC | Peatling Magna, near Market Harborough; Leicestershire; 52.528°N 1.127°W | 2012 | Harborough Museum | 10 gold staters minted in northern France or the Low Countries |
| Polden Hill Hoard | Items from the Polden Hill Hoard in the British Museum | 50 AD to 100 AD | Polden Hill, Somerset; 51.160549°N 2.923972°W | 1800 | British Museum, London | about 90 metal artefacts including horse gear and trappings, segments of 3 shields, 6 brooches, 3 bracelets, parts of 2 torcs |
| Riseholme Hoard | | 50 BC to 50 AD | Riseholme, Lincolnshire; 53.265°N 0.530°W | 2017 | The Collection, Lincoln Museum | 40 gold staters, 231 silver units, and 11 silver half units attributed to the Corieltauvi tribe. |
| Salisbury Hoard | | 3rd century BC (Note: Although buried in the Iron Age, some of the objects in the Salisbury Hoard are dateable to the early Bronze Age (circa 2400 BC), and may have been recovered from a Bronze Age hoard.) | Netherhampton, near Salisbury, Wiltshire; 51.074°N 1.794°W | 1988 | British Museum, London | over 600 objects, mostly miniature bronze versions of shields, tools, daggers and spearheads |
| Scole Hoard | | mid 1st century BC | Scole, Norfolk; 52.364°N 1.156°E | 1982–1983 | | 202 Iceni silver coins and 87 Roman coins |
| Sedgeford Hoard | Cowbone and gold coins of the Sedgeford Hoard | 1st century BC | Sedgeford, Norfolk; 52.90°N 0.55°W | 2003 | King's Lynn Museum | 39 Gallo-Belgic gold staters, concealed inside a cowbone |
| Shalfleet Hoard | Ingot 2 (top) from Shalfleet Hoard (2009) | late 1st century BC to early 1st century AD | Shalfleet, Isle of Wight; 50.701°N 1.458°W | 2009 | Sold at Bonhams, 2011. | four large bowl-shaped silver ingots, six small silver fragments and one gold British B (or "Chute") stater of Late Iron Age date. |
| Silsden Hoard | | mid 1st century AD | Silsden, West Yorkshire; 53.914°N 1.937°W | 1998 | Cliffe Castle Museum, Keighley | 27 gold coins and a finger ring |
| Snettisham Hoard | Selection of torcs from the Snettisham Hoard | mid 1st century BC | Ken Hill, near Snettisham, Norfolk; 52.885°N 0.489°E | 1948–1973 | British Museum, London; Norwich Castle Museum | over 150 gold torc fragments (over 70 of which form complete torcs), and various objects made of metal and jet |
| Southend Hoard | | 60-50 BC | Southend-on-Sea, Essex; 51.53832°N 0.714513°E | 1986 | British Museum, London | pottery sherds and 33 gold staters |
| South Norfolk Hoard | 'Norfolk Wolf' debased gold stater from the South Norfolk Hoard | late 1st century BC | South Norfolk | 2012–2013 | Norwich Castle Museum and Art Gallery | 44 'Norfolk Wolf' debased gold staters |
| South Wight Hoard | | late 1st century BC to early 1st century AD | South Wight, Isle of Wight; 50.600°N 1.200°W | 2004 | British Museum, London | 18 gold staters, 138 silver staters, 1 thin silver coin, 7 copper alloy coins of the Roman period, 2 bowl shaped silver ingots, 1 bowl shaped copper alloy ingot, 5 sherds of Iron Age pottery |
| Stanwick Hoard | Stanwick horse head from the hoard | 50 BC to 100 AD | Stanwick, North Yorkshire; 54.506627°N 1.725548°W | 1843 | British Museum, London | about 180 metal artefacts including four sets of horse harnesses for chariots and a bronze horse head |
| Stirling Hoard | Two gold torcs from the Stirling Hoard | 3rd to 1st century BC | Near Blair Drummond, Stirlingshire; 56.167°N 4.044°W | 2009 | National Museum of Scotland, Edinburgh | 4 gold torcs |
| Stonea Hoard | | 20-50 AD | Stonea, Cambridgeshire; 52.519927°N 0.14303°E | 1983 | British Museum, London | pottery beaker and over 850 silver coins |
| Sunbury Hoard | Two coins from the Sunbury hoard, with design derived from Greek coins of Marseilles, with stylised head of Apollo and butting bull, 100–50 BC | 2nd century BC | Sunbury-on-Thames, Surrey; 51.422°N 0.419°W | 1950 | Museum of London, London | 317 tin alloy coins and 56 fragments, together with fragments of a pottery vessel |
| Syngenta Hoard (Note: The Syngenta Hoard is named after the company on whose land the hoard was found.) | | mid 1st century BC | Jealott's Hill, near Bracknell, Berkshire; 51.456°N 0.748°W | 1998 | Reading Museum | 58 gold coins |
| Tal-y-Llyn Hoard | | 1st century AD | near Tal-y-llyn Lake, Cadair Idris, Merionethshire; 52.672°N 3.897°W | 1963 | National Museum Cardiff | 1 brass plaque, fragments from two brass shields, several decorated brass plates (possibly from a ceremonial cart), and part of a Roman lock |
| Whaddon Chase Hoard | | 1st century BC | near Whaddon, Aylesbury Vale, Buckinghamshire; 52.000°N 0.828°W | 1849 & 2006 | British Museum, London Buckinghamshire County Museum, Aylesbury | between 450 and 800 and 2,000 gold staters — see also Little Horwood Hoard |
| Whitchurch Hoard | Obverse of Chute stater from Whitchurch Hoard (1987) | 1st century BC | Whitchurch, Hampshire; 51.229°N 1.335°W | 1987 | Hampshire Museums Service (4 of each type). The remainder sold at Christies, October 1988, lots 236–246. | 34 Gallo-Belgic E gold staters, and 108 British B (or, Chute,) gold staters. |
| Wickham Market Hoard | Coins from the Wickham Market Hoard | late 1st century BC to early 1st century AD | Wickham Market, Suffolk; 52.150°N 1.367°E | 2008 | Ipswich Museum | 840 gold staters |
| Winchester Hoard | The Winchester Hoard | 1st century BC | near Winchester, Hampshire; 51.063°N 1.308°W | 2000 | British Museum, London | 4 gold brooches 1 gold chain 1 gold bracelet (complete); 2 gold bracelet halves 2 gold torcs |
| Walkington Hoard | A selection from the Walkington Hoard | 1st century BC | Walkington, East Yorkshire; 53.820636°N 0.487977°W | 2005 | Yorkshire Museum, York | a collection of gold staters of the Corieltauvi. Various types of coin. Discovered in batches but regarded as associated. |

== See also ==
- List of hoards in Britain
- List of Bronze Age hoards in Britain
- List of Roman hoards in Britain
