= Great Torc from Snettisham =

Iron Age artifact

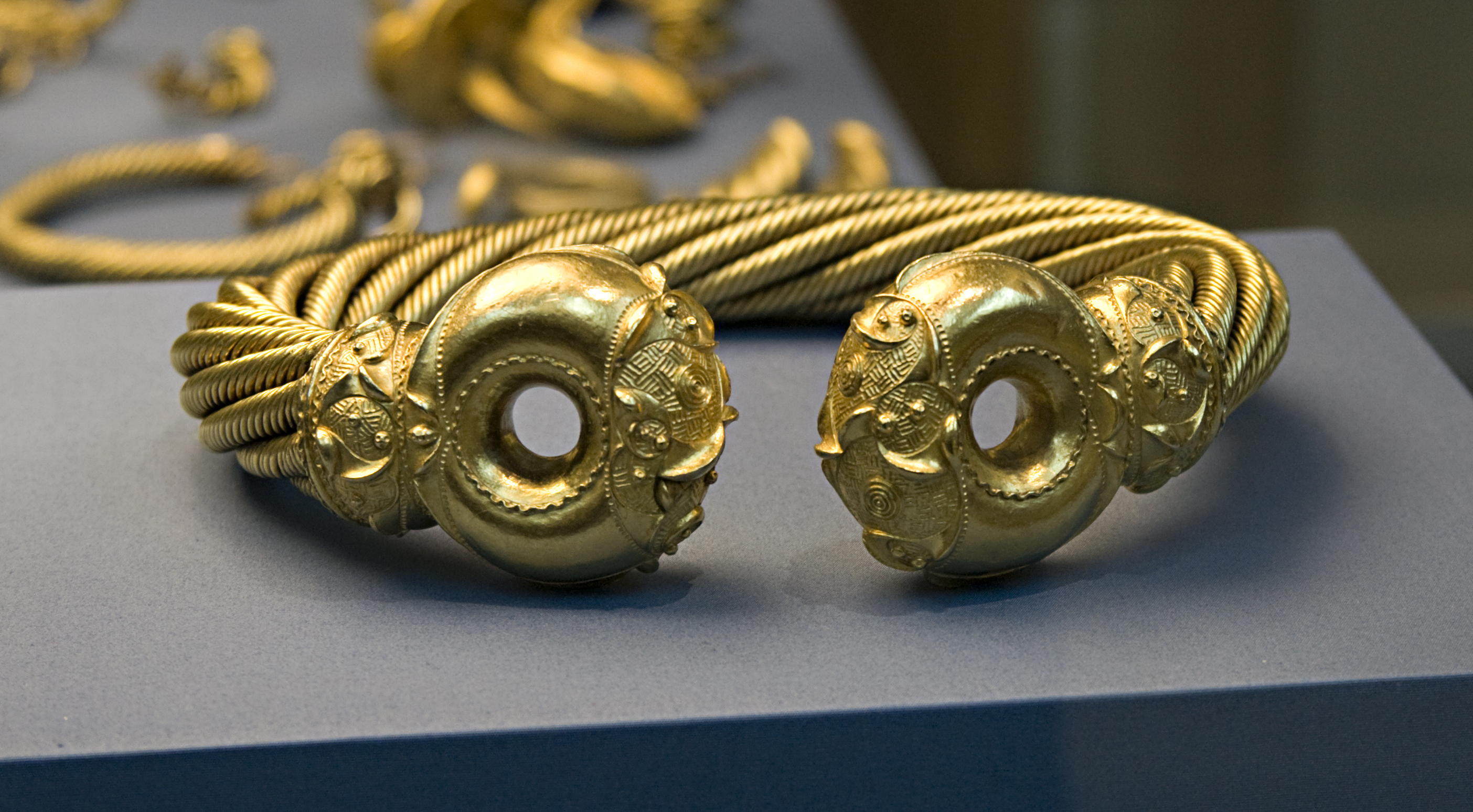
- The Great Torc from Snettisham on display in the British Museum
- Material: Gold alloy
- Size: 20 cm (8 in) diameter
- Weight: 1 kg (2 lb 3 oz)
- Created: 100–75 BC
- Discovered: 1950
- Present location: British Museum, London
- Registration: P&EE 1951 4-2 2

The Great Torc from Snettisham or Snettisham Great Torc is a large Iron Age torc or neck ring in electrum, from the 1st century BC. It is one of the finest pieces of early Celtic art in a distinctly British Celtic style. It is the most spectacular object in the Snettisham Hoard of torcs and other metalwork found in 1950 near the village of Snettisham in Norfolk, East Anglia. The perfectly intact torc is noted for its high level of craftsmanship and artistry. Soon after its discovery it was acquired by the British Museum.

== Discovery ==
The torc was accidentally found in 1950 by a farmer ploughing a field at Ken Hill near the village of Snettisham, Norfolk. It had been buried with a bracelet and coin, which helped to date the torc to around 75 BC. Many other Iron Age hoards have since been found in the vicinity, but the Great Torc is considered by archaeologists to be the most important find from Snettisham. Declared part of a treasure trove soon after its discovery, the torc was purchased by the British Museum with the support of the National Art Collections Fund.

== Description ==
The Great Torc weighs slightly more than 1 kg (2 lb 3 oz) and is mostly made of gold alloyed with a small fraction of silver. The torc was made in two ways: 64 complex threads of metal were grouped into ropes and twisted around each other to create the crescent shaped necklace; the ends of the torc were cast in moulds with La Tène designs and welded onto the metal ropes to create the whole composition. Given the large amount of precious metals found at the site, in addition to the sophisticated design of luxurious jewellery such as this, it has been conjectured that the area around Snettisham may have been connected with royalty from the Iceni tribe, which was based in this part of England at the time.

== See also ==
- Lochar Moss Torc
- Sedgeford Torc
- Newark Torc

== Bibliography ==
- Stead, I. (1996). Celtic Art. British Museum Press.
- Megaw, Ruth; Megaw, Vincent (2001). Celtic Art: From Its Beginnings to the Book of Kells (Revised and Expanded ed.). Thames & Hudson. ISBN 978-0500282656.
- Brailsford, J. W. (1953). Later prehistoric antiquities. London: Trustees of the British Museum.
- Clarke, R. Rainbird (1954). "The Early Iron Age treasure from Snettisham, Norfolk". Proceedings of the Prehistoric Society. 20. The Prehistoric Society.
- Stead, I. (1991). "The Snettisham Treasure: excavations in 1990". Antiquity. 65 (248): 447–464. doi:10.1017/S0003598X00080066.
