= Neil Faulkner (archaeologist) =

British archaeologist, historian, and political activist (1958–2022)

Neil Faulkner FSA
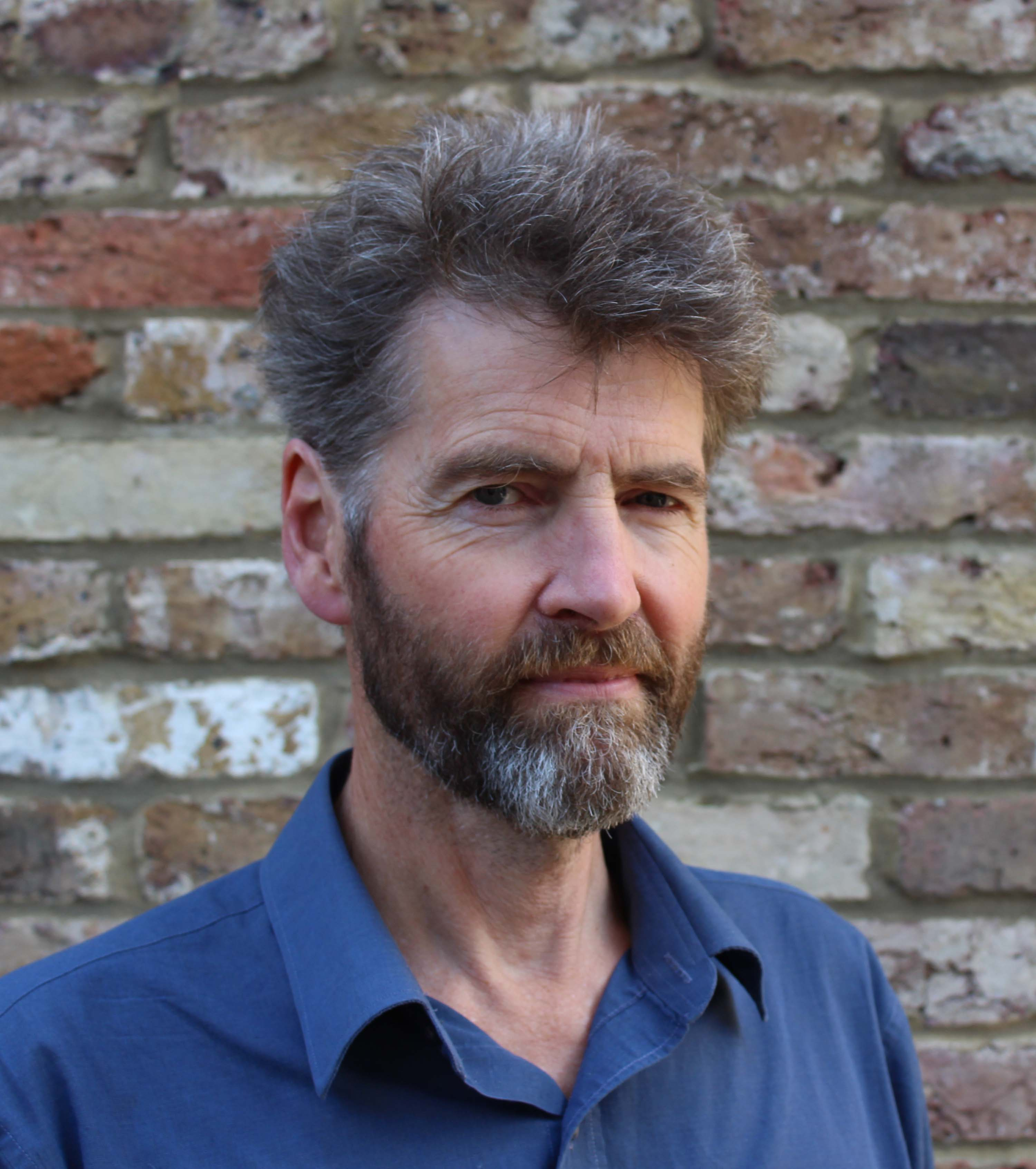
- Born: 22 January 1958
- Died: 4 February 2022 (aged 64)
- Education: Skinners' School
- Alma mater: King's College, Cambridge; University College London
- Occupations: Historian; Archaeologist; Author; Academic
- Notable work: A Marxist History of the World; A People's History of the Russian Revolution; A Radical History of the World
- Political party: Socialist Workers Party (1980–2010)
- Children: 3

Neil Faulkner FSA (22 January 1958 – 4 February 2022) was a British archaeologist, historian, writer, lecturer, broadcaster, and political activist.

== Biography ==
Faulkner was born on 22 January 1958. He was educated at the Skinners' School in Tunbridge Wells, King's College, Cambridge and the Institute of Archaeology, University College London. Faulkner was a school teacher before becoming an archaeologist.

He was a Research Fellow at the University of Bristol, co-founder and contributing editor of Archaeology Worldwide magazine, editor of Military History Matters, a contributing editor of Current Archaeology, and co-director of the Great Arab Revolt Project (in Jordan) and the Sedgeford Historical and Archaeological Research Project (in Norfolk, England). On 22 May 2008, he was elected a Fellow of the Society of Antiquaries of London (FSA).

Faulkner was diagnosed with a rare and aggressive form of blood lymphoma in mid-2021. He died from the cancer in February 2022, at the age of 64.

== Research ==
Originally trained as a Romanist, Faulkner excavated an Anglo-Saxon site at Sedgeford in Norfolk from 1996 with the Sedgeford Historical and Archaeological Research Project (SHARP). In 2016, he completed a ten-year field project looking at the military campaigns of Lawrence of Arabia in southern Jordan (the Great Arab Revolt Project).

The author of many articles and numerous academic papers, his ten books include The Decline and Fall of Roman Britain, Apocalypse: The Great Jewish Revolt Against Rome, Rome: Empire of the Eagles, A Visitor's Guide to the Ancient Olympics, A Marxist History of the World: From Neanderthals to Neoliberals, and Digging Sedgeford: A People's Archaeology. His latest book is Lawrence of Arabia's War (Yale University Press).

== Media appearances ==
Faulkner appeared frequently on television, both at home and abroad. His TV work includes Channel Four's Time Team, BBC2's Timewatch, and Sky Atlantic's The British. He appeared as both academic specialist and political commentator. He made several short history documentaries for Tariq Ali's regular Telesur series The World Today.

In 2019, Faulkner appeared on BBC Radio 4's programme In Our Time to discuss Lawrence of Arabia.

== Politics ==
Faulkner was a Marxist and a revolutionary socialist activist. Having previously been a long-standing member of the Socialist Workers Party, from 1980 to 2010, and then a member of Counterfire, he left in order to set up Brick Lane Debates and the Left Book Club. In 2020 he was on the co-ordinating committee of Anti-Capitalist Resistance. His strongly-held beliefs were sometimes considered a detriment to his archaeological work, Gavin Speed wrote "Faulkner unfortunately takes [his negative views of the Roman Empire in Britain] to an extreme to the detriment of his argument by approaching the study with preconceived ideas and opinions that seem to ignore or gloss over key archaeological evidence."

== Publications ==
- The Decline and Fall of Roman Britain. Tempus. (2000). ISBN 978-0752419442
- Apocalypse: The Great Jewish Revolt Against Rome (2002) Tempus, first edition; (2012) Amberley Publishing, second edition
- Rome: Empire of the Eagles, 753 BC – AD 476 (2009), Routledge
- A Visitor's Guide to the Ancient Olympics, Yale University Press, (1 May 2012)
- A Marxist History of the World: From Neanderthals to Neoliberals Pluto Press. (5 April 2013).
- Digging Sedgeford: A People's Archaeology. Poppyland Publishing. (2014). ISBN 978-1909796089
- Lawrence of Arabia's War: The Arabs, the British and the Remaking of the Middle East in WWI. Yale University Press. (2016). ISBN 978-0300196832
- Creeping Fascism: Brexit, Trump, and the Rise of the Far Right. Public Reading Rooms. (2017). 235 pages. ISBN 978-0995535237
- A People's History of the Russian Revolution. Pluto Press. (15 April 2017). ISBN 978-0745399034
- A Radical History of the World. Pluto Press. (15 October 2018). 512 pages. ISBN 978-0745338040
- Abandoned Places of World War I, Amber Books (2021),
- Empire and Jihad: The Anglo-Arab Wars of 1870-1920. Yale University Press. (2021)
