= Lochar =

Lochar may refer to:

- Lochar (ward), Dumfries and Galloway, Scotland
- Lochar Moss Torc, an Iron Age brass torc
- Lochar Thistle F.C., Dumfries, Scotland
- Lochar Water, a stream in Dumfries and Galloway

== See also ==
- Locher (disambiguation)
