= Leekfrith torcs =

Archaeological find in Staffordshire, England

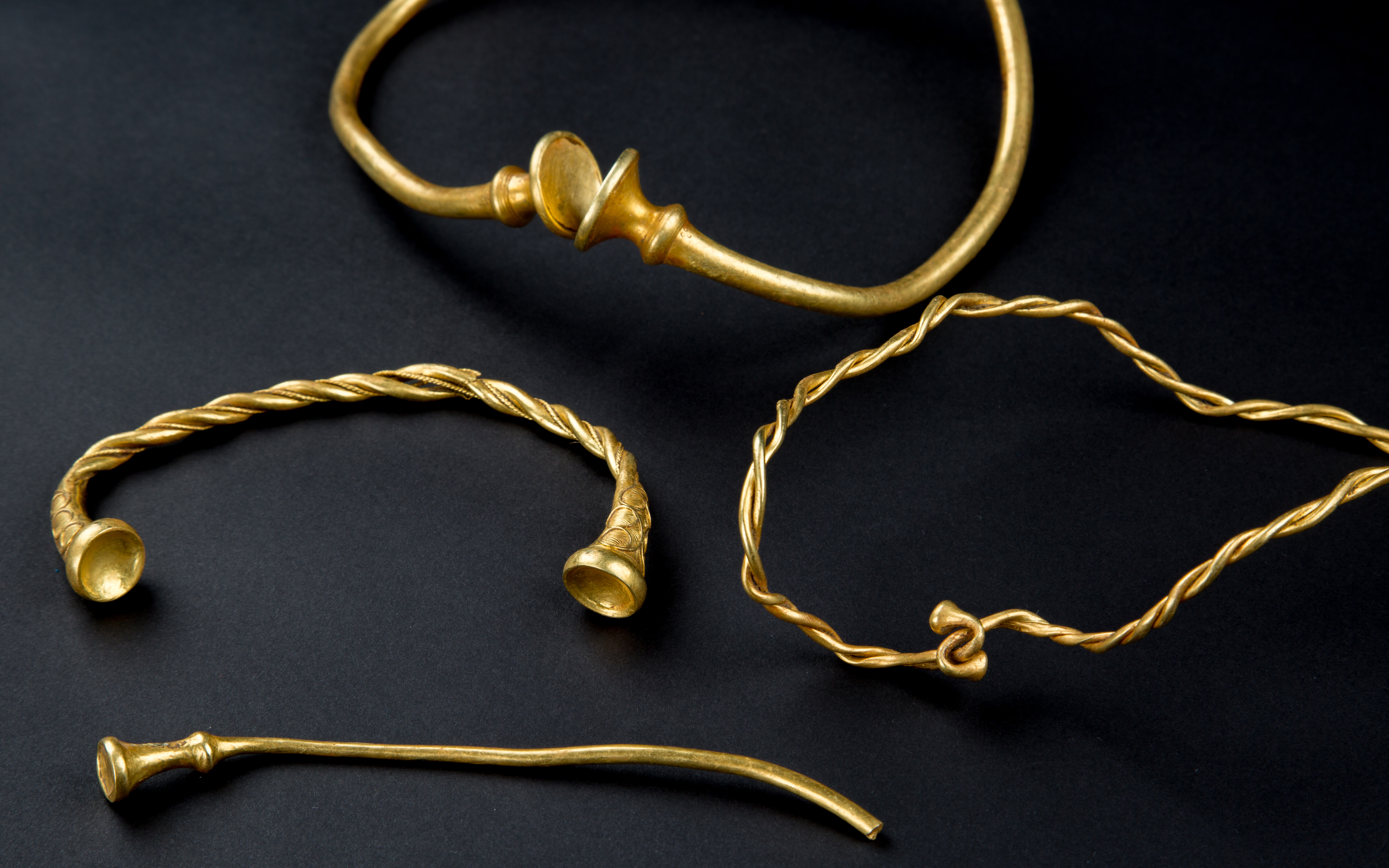
- The Leekfrith torcs (bracelet centre-left)
- Material: Gold
- Created: c. 400—250 BC
- Discovered: December 2016; Leekfrith, Staffordshire, England
- Discovered by: Metal detectorists
- Present location: Potteries Museum & Art Gallery, Hanley

Location
- Location of Leekfrith
- Official website

The Leekfrith torcs are four Iron Age gold torcs found by two hobby metal detectorists in December 2016 in a field in Leekfrith, north Staffordshire, England. The find consists of three neck torcs and a smaller bracelet, which were located close to each other. They are believed to be the oldest Iron Age gold jewellery found in Britain. Subsequent archaeological examination of the area did not uncover further objects.

== Description ==
One of the torcs is a smaller bracelet decorated with ornament in the style of Celtic art, and the other three are neck rings. The bracelet and one of the neck rings are made with twisted gold wire, and the other neck rings have finials shaped like trumpets. One of the latter has been broken into two pieces.

The gold content of the four torcs has been measured using x-ray fluorescence to be between 74–78% (roughly equivalent to 17–18 carat), with 18–22% silver, some copper, and traces of iron, mercury and tin – a mix consistent with other Iron Age gold finds in Europe. The weight of the pieces varies from 31 grams (1 oz) to 230 grams (8 oz), and over 350 grams (10 oz) in total.

According to Julia Farley, curator of British and European Iron Age collections of the British Museum, the torcs were "most likely" made in the area of what is now Germany or France, most likely in the period 400–250 BCE (La Tène period). Farley commented:

This unique find is of international importance. It dates to around 400–250 BCE and is probably the earliest Iron Age gold work ever discovered in Britain. The torcs were probably worn by wealthy and powerful women, perhaps people from the Continent who had married into the local community. Piecing together how these objects came to be carefully buried in a Staffordshire field will give us an invaluable insight into life in Iron Age Britain.

== Discovery ==
The torcs were found by Mark Hambleton and Joe Kania at around noon on 11 December 2016, in a field in Leekfrith that the two men were searching using metal detectors. The men had permission from the landowner for the search. At the time, Hambleton and Kania had not discovered anything of note with their metal detectors besides Victorian coins. They had no fixed plans as they surveyed the field, having started metal detecting as a hobby 18 months before, although Hambleton had gone metal-detecting with his father when he was young.

They found the first three torcs separately, approximately 6 to 8 inches (15 to 20 cm) beneath the surface of the field and around 3.3 feet (1 m) apart. The metal detectorists reported the find to a Portable Antiquities Scheme officer based at Birmingham Museum and Art Gallery the next day. The last torc was found by the same men, in the same field, several weeks later.

Archaeologists subsequently surveyed the site, but found no other items, declaring it a "complete find". They also found no evidence of a settlement or grave on the site. A missing piece of the smallest torc was discovered by the original metal detectorists on 26 February 2017.

== Inquest ==
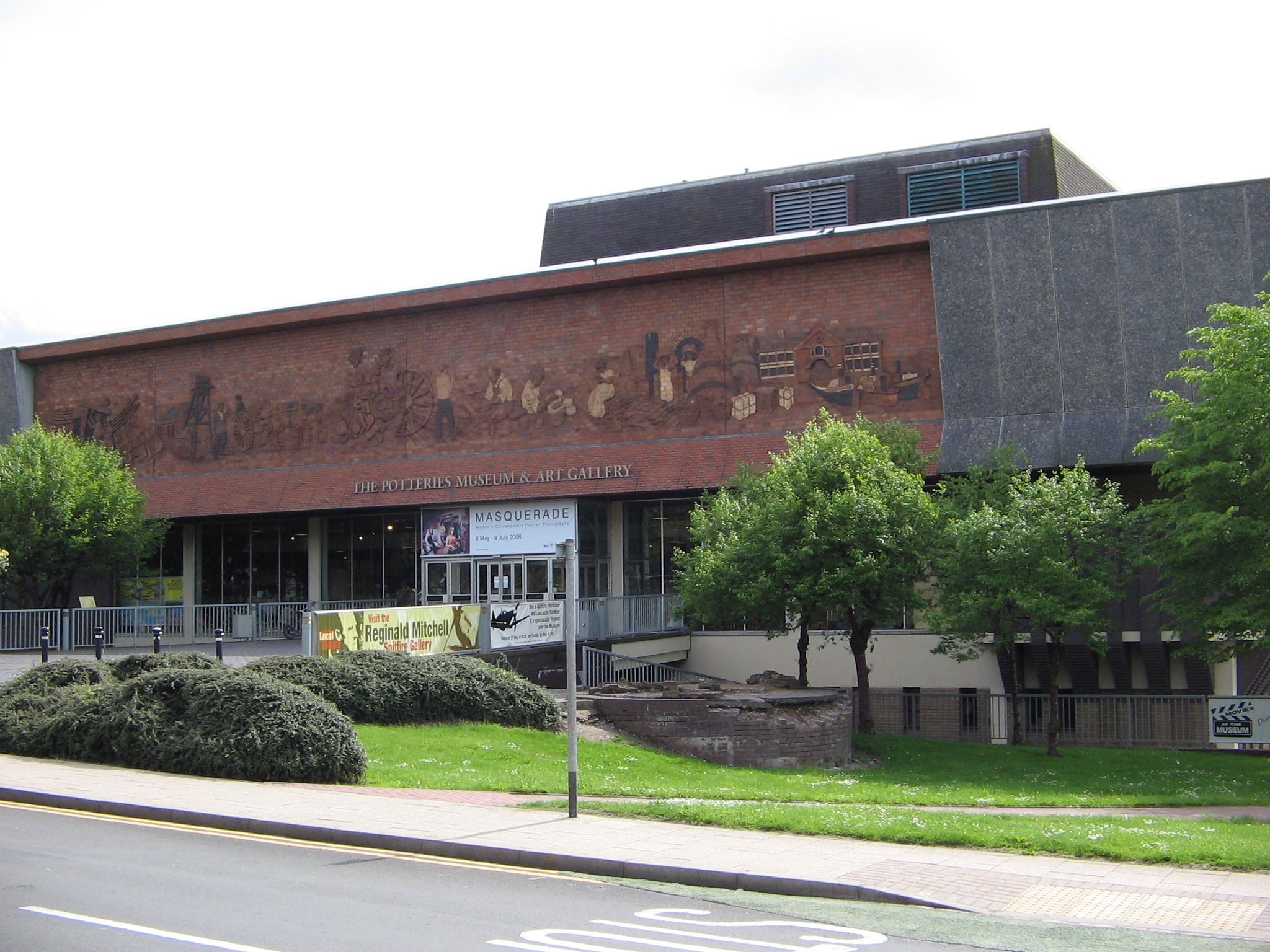
The Potteries Museum & Art Gallery, where the torcs were first put on display to the public

The find was publicly announced on 28 February 2017 at a press conference at the Potteries Museum & Art Gallery in Hanley.

At an inquest held later the same day, the torcs were declared to be 'Treasure' under the Treasure Act 1996. H M Senior Coroner for Stoke-on-Trent and North Staffordshire, Ian Smith, described the find as "not quite in the same league as the Staffordshire Hoard, but nevertheless exciting."

As a result of the coroner's finding, the items were offered for sale to museums at a price set by an independent board of antiquities experts known as the Treasure Valuation Committee, with the finders and landowners sharing the money paid by the museum that buys them.

Prior to undergoing valuation, the torcs were placed on public display at the Potteries Museum & Art Gallery from 1 March to 2 April 2017. In December 2017, following a £325,000 fundraising campaign, the torcs went on permanent display at the museum.

== See also ==
- Stirling torcs, 300–100 BC
- Snettisham Hoard large torc hoard, c. 70 BC
- Newark Torc, 200–50 BC
- Ipswich Hoard, 979–985 AD
