= Potteries Museum & Art Gallery =

Art museum & local museum in Stoke-on-Trent, UK

The Potteries Museum and Art Gallery
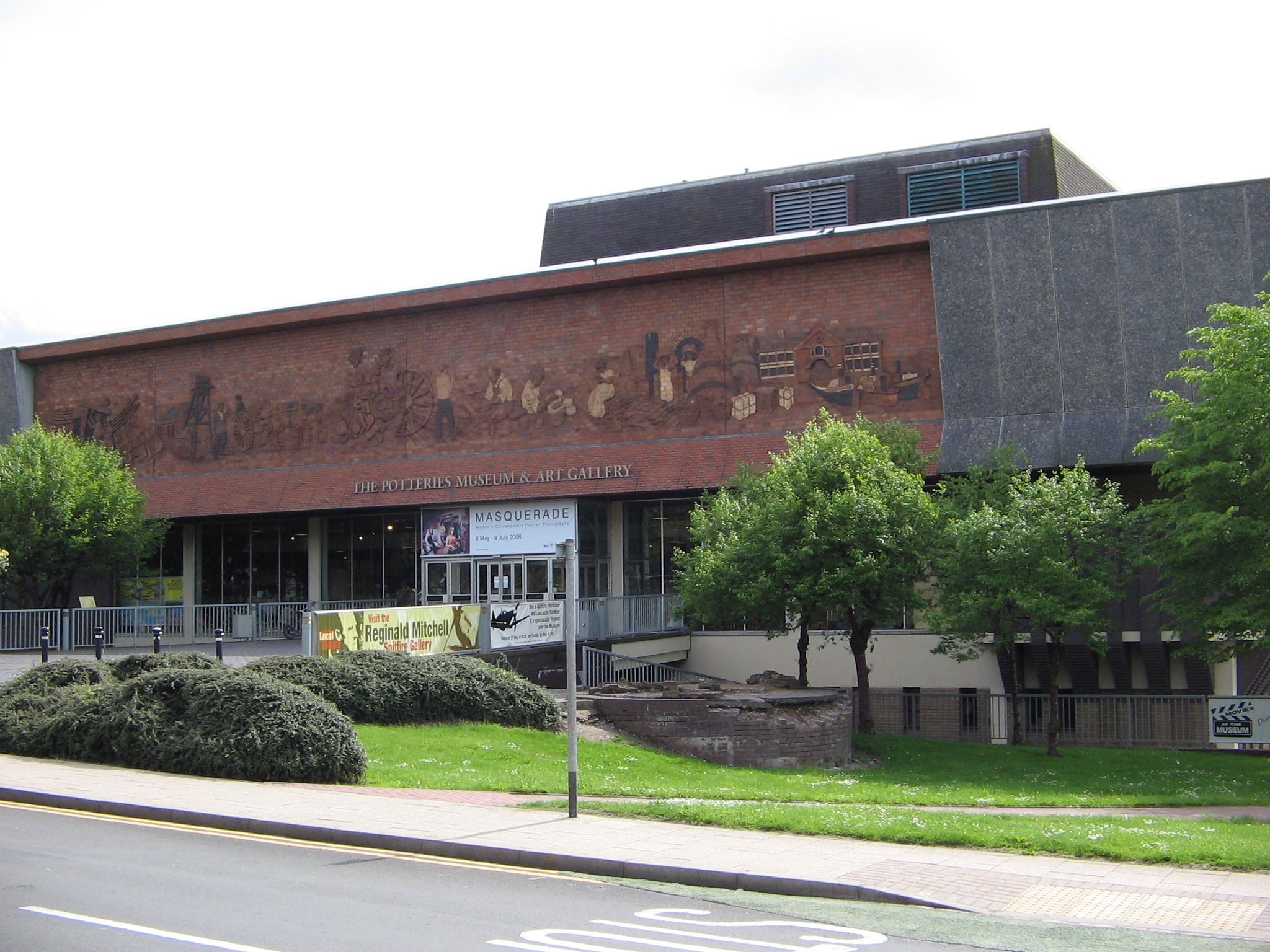
- Museum entrance
- Location: Hanley, Stoke-on-Trent, United Kingdom
- Coordinates: 53.0229°N 2.1781°W
- Type: Art museum & local museum
- Visitors: over 100k per annum
- Curators: Curators for Arts, Ceramics, Natural Science and Local History
- Website: www.stokemuseums.org.uk/pmag

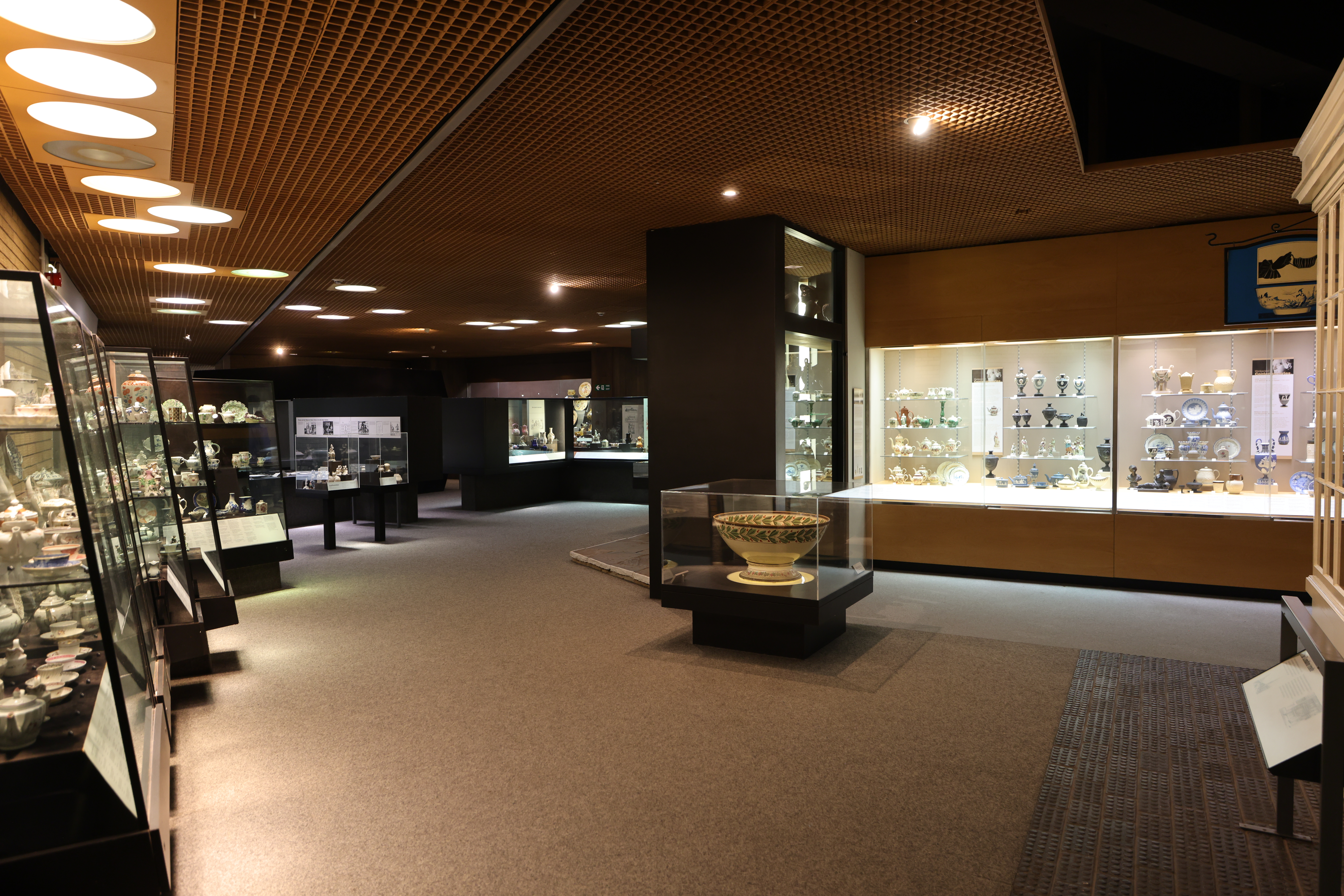
one of the museum galleries

The Potteries Museum & Art Gallery is in Bethesda Street, Hanley, one of the six towns of Stoke-on-Trent in Staffordshire. Admission is free.

One of the four local authority museums in the city, the other three being Gladstone Pottery Museum, Ford Green Hall and Etruria Industrial Museum, The Potteries Museum & Art Gallery houses collections that bring together the identities that went into forming the area known as the Potteries. The museum holds a collection of Staffordshire ceramics.

All the collections at this museum are categorized as Designated Collections. Galleries display fine and decorative arts, costume, local history, archaeology and natural science collections. There is a Second World War aircraft on permanent display, a Supermarine Spitfire whose earlier Marks were designed by R. J. Mitchell who came from nearby Butt Lane.

== History ==
The museum opened on its current site in 1956 as the Stoke-on-Trent City Museum & Art Gallery. The building was designed by the city architect; J. R. Piggott.

The museum's Spitfire, was received from the Royal Air Force (RAF) in 1972. Over the winter of 1985/86 the Spitfire was moved from its previous home in a glasshouse outside the museum to a specially constructed gallery within the museum.

In 1981 the museum opened a new building to a design by the firm Wood, Goldstraw and Yorath. The museum won the Museum of the Year award in 1982.

Since February 2010, The Potteries Museum & Art Gallery has been the home of a number of artefacts from the Staffordshire Hoard. 52,500 visitors viewed 118 items at the Potteries Museum during a 23-day exhibition in February 2010. Since Birmingham Museum and Art Gallery and Stoke-on-Trent Museums have purchased the Hoard, items have been on permanent display at both venues. Over 80 pieces can be seen in The Potteries Museum & Art Gallery's archaeology gallery. Redevelopment of the Saxon part to this gallery in the latter half of 2010 has set the Hoard within a more tangible context, using existing pieces from the museum's collection of Staffordshire archaeology.

In 2012 the museum ran an exhibition on the subject of connections between Stoke-on-Trent and the Titanic. It included information on people from the area who died in the sinking and archive footage of Captain Edward Smith who was born in Hanley.

On 28 February 2017, the Leekfrith torcs, believed to be the oldest Iron Age gold jewellery found in Britain, were unveiled to the public for the first time, at the museum. From the following day, they were placed on public display.

In June 2017 a bronze statue of Arnold Bennett was located on the pavement just next to the front entrance to the museum.

In the 2010s the museum's Spitfire underwent a three-year restoration program before returning to a new gallery at the museum in September 2021. It is planned that the museum will close for a refit from 20 December until March 2026.

== See also ==
- Mercian Trail
- List of surviving Supermarine Spitfires
