= Lochar Moss Torc =

Iron Age brass torc

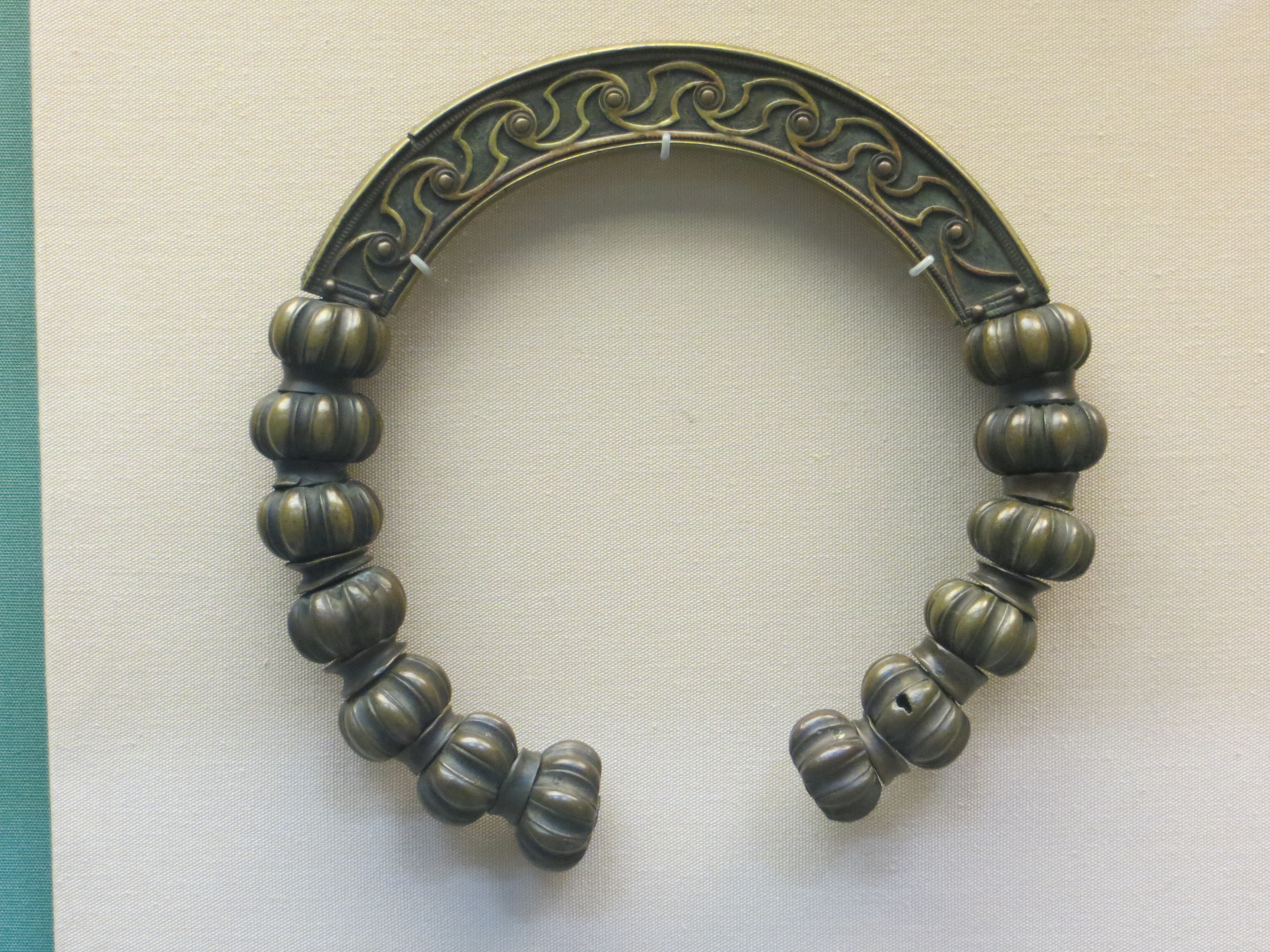
- Lochar Moss Torc in the British Museum
- Material: Brass
- Size: 16 cm diameter
- Created: c. 50-200 AD
- Present location: British Museum, London
- Registration: P&EE 1853.11-5.2

The Lochar Moss Torc is an Iron Age brass torc or neck-ring found in Lochar Moss, near Dumfries in Scotland. It was found by chance in the early nineteenth century and was later donated to the British Museum.

== Discovery ==
Lochar Moss, located on the Solway Firth in southwest Scotland, was one of the largest raised peat lands in Europe until much of it was destroyed and reclaimed for agricultural and urban uses in the nineteenth and twentieth centuries. It was in the 1840s that two Iron Age objects, a bowl and torc, were accidentally unearthed during peat-cutting. Most scholars suggest that the two items were deliberately deposited in the bog as a votive or religious offering. They later came in to the possession of a local collector called Thomas Gray, who presented them both to the British Museum in 1853.

== Description ==
The Lochar Moss Torc was found inside a small bronze bowl, which helped to preserve it relatively intact. The collar is made of brass and is cast in two pieces: a solid crescent-shaped bar with engraved La Tène patterns and a series of hollow beads, one of which is missing. Although it was without doubt a prestigious item of jewellery that was cherished by the local community, it remains unclear who it originally belonged to and how the collar would have been worn by the wearer. The design of this type of neck-ring is unique to northern Britain during the early stages of the Roman colonisation of the province of Britannia.

== See also ==
- Great Torc from Snettisham
- Sedgeford Torc
- Newark Torc

== Bibliography ==
- I. Stead, Celtic Art, British Museum Press, 1996
- Megaw Ruth and Vincent, Celtic Art: From Its Beginnings to the Book of Kells, 2001
- M. MacGregor, Early Celtic Art in North Britain, Leicester University Press, 1976
- J.W. Brailsford, Later prehistoric antiquities (London, Trustees of the British Museum, 1953
