= Sedgeford Historical and Archaeological Research Project =

The Sedgeford Historical and Archaeological Research Project (SHARP) is a long-term, multidisciplinary research project based in and around Sedgeford, a village in north-west Norfolk, United Kingdom. It is involved in the investigation of the local history and archaeology, with a strong emphasis on community involvement, practical training and education. The project attracts volunteer excavators and students from all over the world.

== History ==
An Anglo-Saxon skeleton excavated by SHARP

In 1957–58, Peter Jewell of the University of Cambridge excavated small trenches on the "Boneyard Field" and recorded a number of human burials and features.

In 1995, a conversation in the Europa Hotel in Sorrento between Neil Faulkner, then still a research student at University College London, and the landowners of the Sedgeford Hall Estate, Bernard and Susan Campbell, about his desire to direct an excavation, leading to the Campbells mentioning the archaeological richness of Boneyard.

SHARP was founded in 1996, initially focussing on the same Anglo-Saxon cemetery located to the south of the village of Sedgeford. Since that time, SHARP has investigated many other sites within the parish using a variety of methods: open-area excavation, test-pitting, geophysical survey, fieldwalking and metal detection, and the analysis of historical documents.

== Organization ==
SHARP is made up of a team of directors, supervisors, trustees and committee members, along with a number of excavators and other volunteers during June-August. From 1997, the project has served as a model for Faulkner's "Democratic Archaeology" in rejecting traditional hierarchies, though is still broadly a community archaeology project.

== Education ==
The Project is one of the largest training digs in the UK, providing practical training in excavation and recording as well as running taught courses on aspects of the site: e.g. skeletal remains, artefacts, and Anglo-Saxon history. However, unlike most training sites, it is independent from any one academic institution and operates as a registered UK charity (number 1064553).

== Projects ==
Apart from the Anglo-Saxon cemetery, fieldwork has also been conducted on Iron Age, Roman, medieval and modern remains in the Sedgeford parish, with the West Hall area receiving considerable attention as the historic centre of the modern village. Excavations, including test pits in a number of gardens, have taken place throughout the village. Work has also been done on the First World War-era RAF Sedgeford aerodrome.

== Sites and finds of interest ==
One of the "Boneyard" open-area excavations

Over the years a number of particularly unusual discoveries have been made:

- Part of The Sedgeford Torc – discovered by SHARP in 2004, the missing gold Iron Age torc terminal of the main body of the Sedgeford torc (found in 1965) has been reunited with the rest of the artefact in the British Museum.
- The Sedgeford Hoard – recovered during the 2003 excavation season. This Iron Age hoard of Gallo-Belgic gold staters was hidden in a cow bone and identified by x-ray.
- Iron Age horse burial – discovered on the same day as the hoard of coins.
- The Body in the Oven – unexpectedly found in 2006 from a Roman site. This human skeleton had been burned in a feature believed to be a fire-pit for a grain-dryer or malting oven. Several unusual aspects of the find led to it being described as "an unsolved murder" in the local and national press. There are few equivalent cremation/inhumations from this period anywhere in Europe.
- Boneyard – the whole site, excavated from 1996 to 2007, revealed part of an extensive cemetery. Almost 300 articulated human inhumations were lifted, reflecting only a portion of the actual number buried. In addition SHARP recovered a huge quantity of disarticulated human bone (charnel). The size of this burial site, particularly as there is no large population centre known nearby, makes it a very unusual skeletal archive.
- Anglo-Saxon noblewoman – found buried within the same grave as a partially complete horse skeleton.
- Chalkpit Field – Settlement associated with the inhumation cemetery within 'Boneyard'.
- Late Neolithic/ Early Bronze Age Crouched burial – Found in 2009 within the excavations looking at the settlement within the Chalkpit field. Radiocarbon dated between 2458 – 2200 cal BC.
- Middle Iron Age Crouched burial – Found the following year in 2010, 25m from the late Neolithic/Early Bronze Age Burial. Radiocarbon dated between 373 and 203 BC.

== Publications ==
- Dennis, Megan; Faulkner, Neil (2005). The Sedgeford Hoard. The History Press. ISBN 978-0752434384.
- Faulkner, Neil; Robinson, Keith; Rossin, Gary, eds. (2014). Digging Sedgeford: A People's Archaeology. Poppyland Publishing. ISBN 978-1909796089.
- Rossin, Gary (2018). Sedgeford Aerodrome and the aerial conflict over North West Norfolk during the First World War. Poppyland Publishing. ISBN 978-1909796423.
