= Ipswich Hoard =

Hoards in Britain

Coordinates: 52.025089°N 1.106694°E

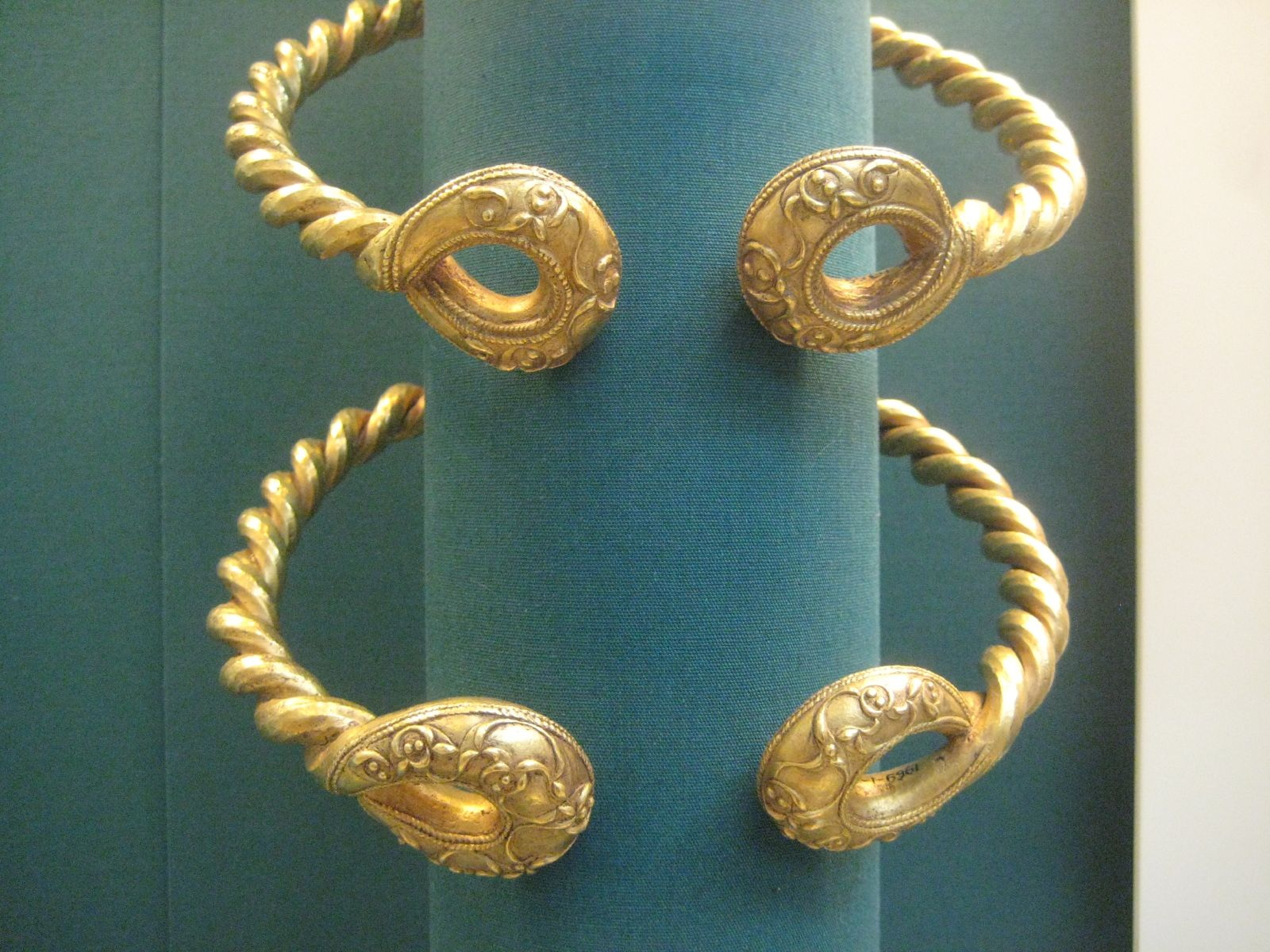
- Two of the torcs
- Discovered: in Ipswich
- Present location: British Museum, London

There are two notable Ipswich Hoards. The first was a hoard of Anglo-Saxon coins discovered in 1863. The second was a hoard of six Iron Age gold torcs that was discovered in 1968 and 1969. The latter hoard has been described as second only to the Snettisham Hoard in importance as a hoard from the Iron Age, and is held at the British Museum.

== First hoard (1863) ==
The first hoard was found in an earthenware pot buried about 10 feet (3 m) beneath the doorstep of the house at the corner of Old Buttermarket and St Lawrence Lane in Ipswich, which had previously belonged to numismatist James Conder (1763–1823), when it was demolished during road widening in 1863. It was reported as consisting of 150 coins, although only 75 are known now. The coins were all silver pennies of the reign of the Saxon king Æthelred the Unready, minted in London and Ipswich. It is tempting to associate this find with the ravaging of Ipswich which took place in 991. However clues in the coins indicate that the hoard may have been deposited between 979 and 985.

== Second hoard (1968–69) ==
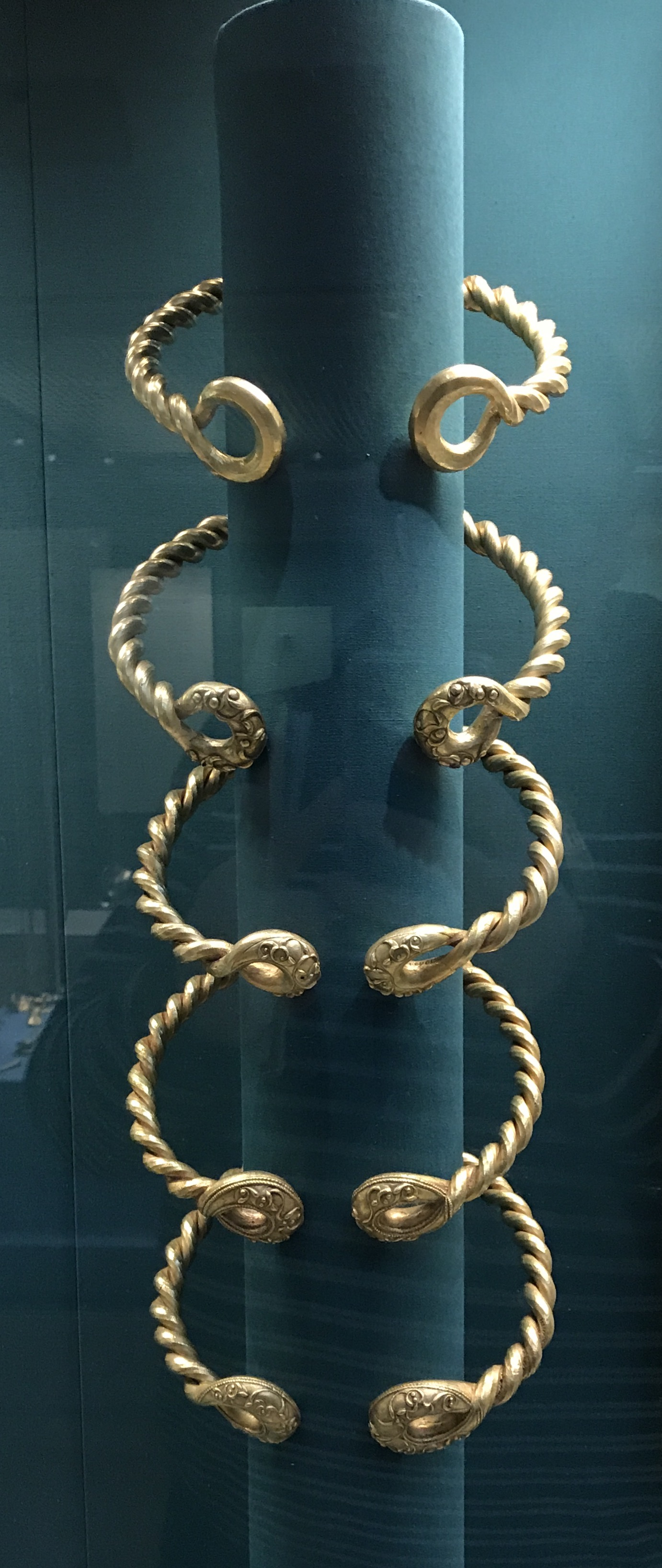
5 Torcs from the Ipswich Hoard on display at the British Museum.

=== Discovery ===
Five neck ornaments called torcs were discovered in 1968 by the operator of a mechanical digger preparing the ground for the construction of new housing in Belstead, near Ipswich, for which the driver received £45,000, a sixth torc of a slightly different design was discovered a year later by the owner of one of the newly completed houses when sorting through a pile of earth left by the building in his garden, for which he received £9,000.

=== Appearance ===
The torcs were manufactured by twisting two strands of large diameter wire around each other and fashioning them into a near circle. The ends of the twisted wire are finished with terminal decorations. They are made from green gold as they have a lower proportion of silver in them than later finds, leading British Museum experts to date their manufacture to about 75 B.C. However, the torcs may have been used by many generations before they were hoarded away. The museum estimates that the maximum neck diameter of the people who wore these torcs was 18.7 centimetres (7.4 in).

These would have been created in wax around the ends of the wire. The wax is then coated, at least once, with a ceramic slurry and left to harden. The ceramic is then heated which allows the wax to leave and gold is poured into the cavity. This lost wax process allows the terminals to include a level of detail that was initially created on the wax. The terminals created for these torcs were hollow. Each of the torcs has a slightly different design for the left and right terminal.

== Today ==
The 1968 finds are in room 50 of the British Museum, but there are also copies of these torcs in the Ipswich Museum.

== See also ==
- Torc
- Snettisham Hoard
- Newark Torc
- Stirling Hoard
- Leekfrith torcs
- Sedgeford Torc
- List of hoards in Britain
- List of Iron Age hoards in Great Britain
