= Snettisham Jeweller's Hoard =

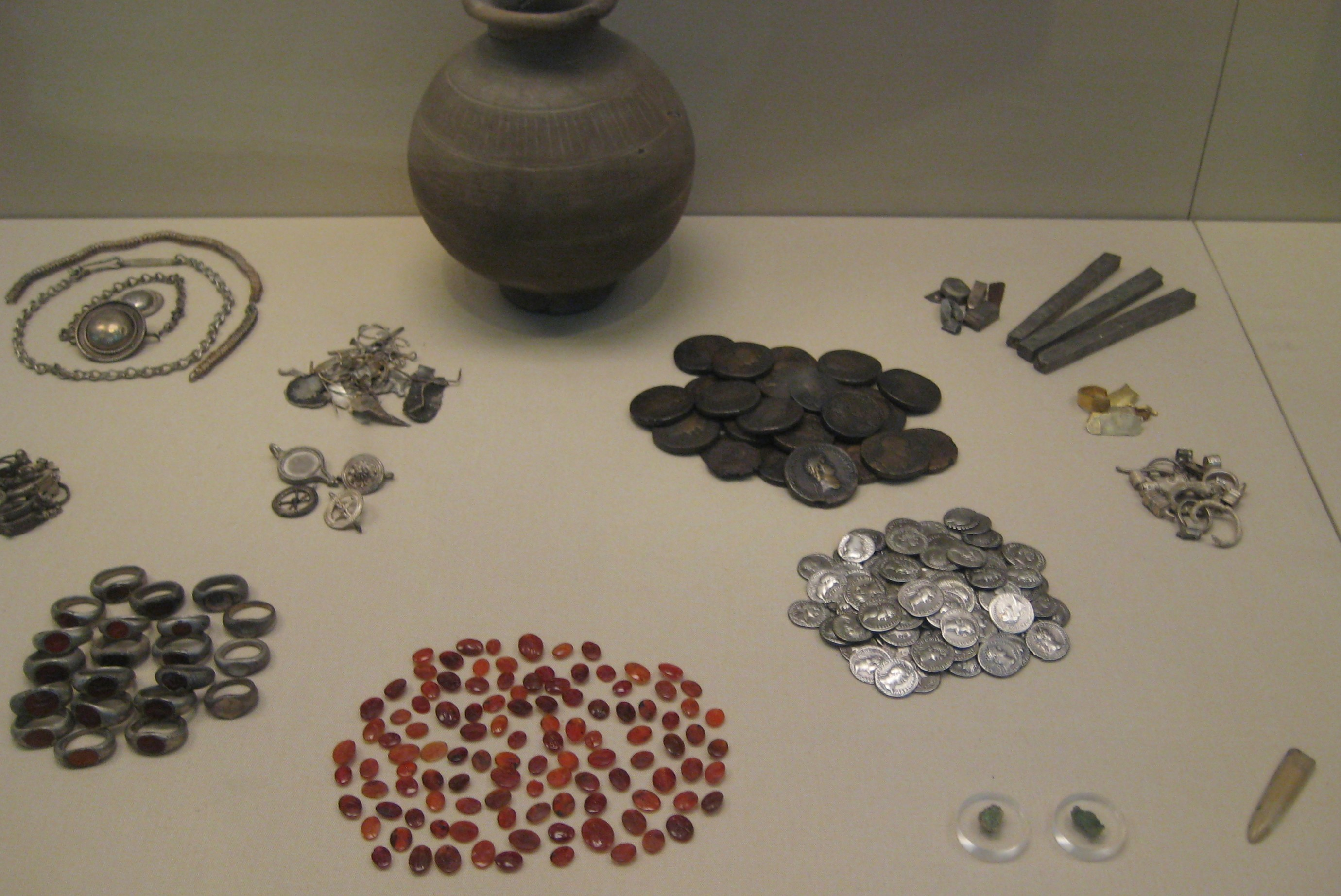
- Pot and some of the contents from the Snettisham Jeweller's Hoard
- Material: Gold; Silver; Gemstones; Ceramic
- Created: AD 155
- Discovered: 1985; Snettisham; 52.875842°N 0.49696038°E
- Present location: British Museum

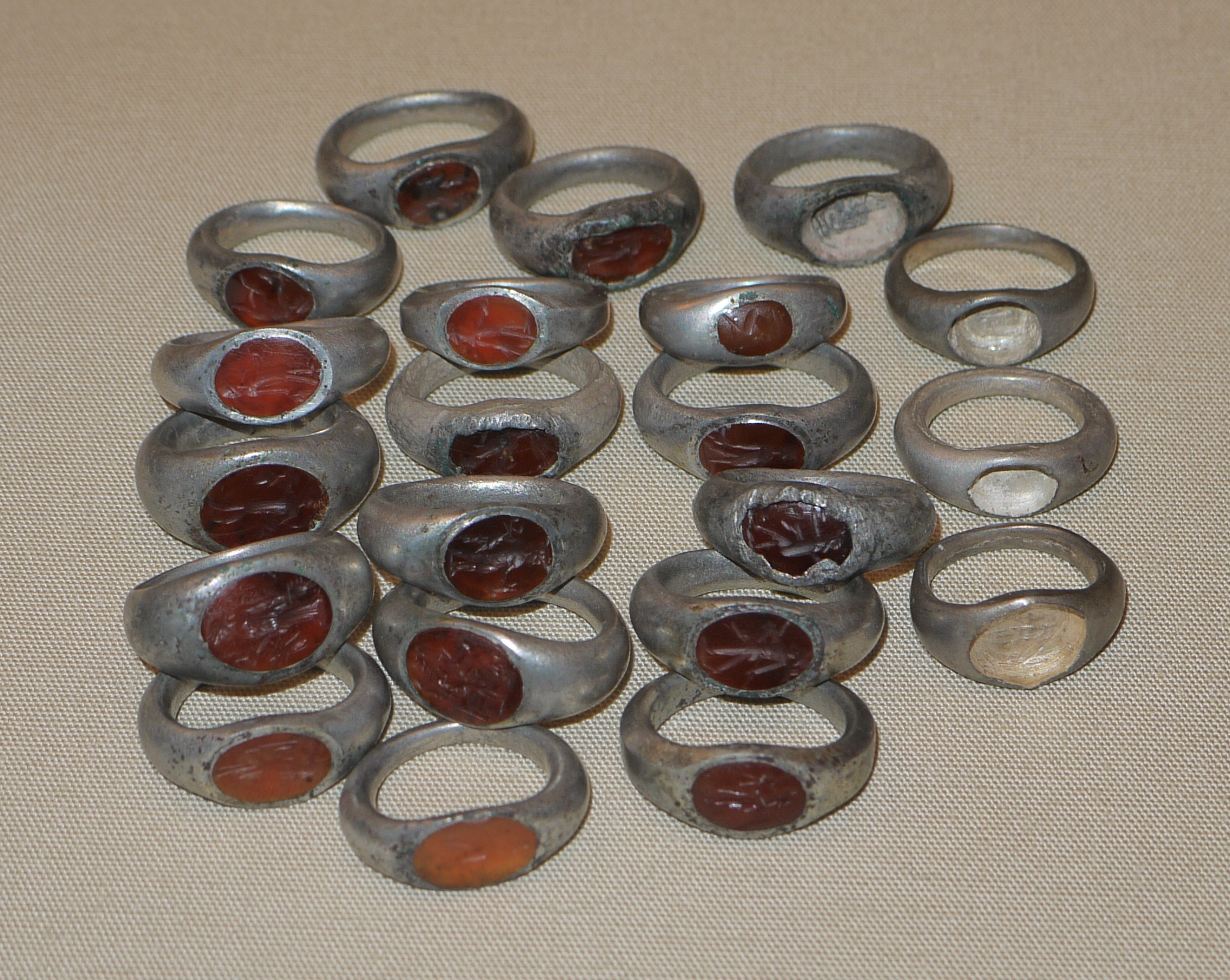
Jewel-set rings from the Snettisham Jeweller's Hoard.

The Snettisham Jeweller's Hoard is a collection of Romano-British jewellery and raw materials, found during the construction of a house in the Norfolk village of Snettisham in 1985. The hoard is thought to be the working stock of a jeweller, buried in a single clay pot around 155 AD. The finds include the working tip of a quartz burnishing tool (its handle has not survived), partially or fully completed items of jewellery, and raw materials: mainly silver coins, scrap silver items and silver ingots, but also six pieces of scrap gold, and many engraved gemstones to be set in rings. The presence of scrap gold and silver and absence of base metals indicates that the jeweller dealt mainly with high-status customers.

The 17.5 centimetres (6.9 in) high pot in which the hoard was found is local grey-ware, spherical with relatively narrow opening and base, with a capacity of around 1.6 litres (0.35 imp gal; 0.42 US gal). Some items – such as bracelets – had to be bent to fit through the opening. Within the pot were found:

- 110 coins: 83 silver denarii and 27 bronze coins; 74 of the silver coins are from the third issue by Domitian (81–96 AD), one with a relatively high silver content. There are also some posthumous coins of the deified Empress Faustina I (dated to 154–155 AD) which give a terminus post quem for the burial of the hoard. The silver coins are probably raw materials; the bronze coins may be the jeweller's own petty cash.
- 117 engraved carnelian gemstones, of which only 7 stones are mounted in finger rings. Most have simple wheel-cut intaglio engravings with symbols of good luck, including deities such as Fortuna, Bonus Eventus, and Ceres. Stylistic differences indicate that the gemstones were produced by at least three different engravers.
- A variety of completed rings, illustrating the range of variation available to a provincial jeweller, some set with gems, but many snake-rings, with a snake's head stamped in low relief at either end of a silver ribbon which would then be bent into shape.
- Snake-bracelets, like the snake-rings, produced by stamping with a hammer and dies.
- Silver chain necklaces with crescent pendants and wheel clasps, possibly representing the moon and the sun.
- Quartz burnishing tool; its handle has not survived, but traces of gold on the tool show that it was used to polish gold.
- Two rare scraps of Roman linen, one attached to a coin and another to a ring.

The silver finds were covered in a layer of silver chloride corrosion, and some items including copper were covered with green copper carbonate verdigris.

The finds are held by the British Museum.

== See also ==
- Snettisham Hoard of Iron Age objects, found nearby in 1948
