= Sedgeford Torc =

Iron Age torc

Coordinates: 52.903467°N 0.545698°E

The Sedgeford Torc
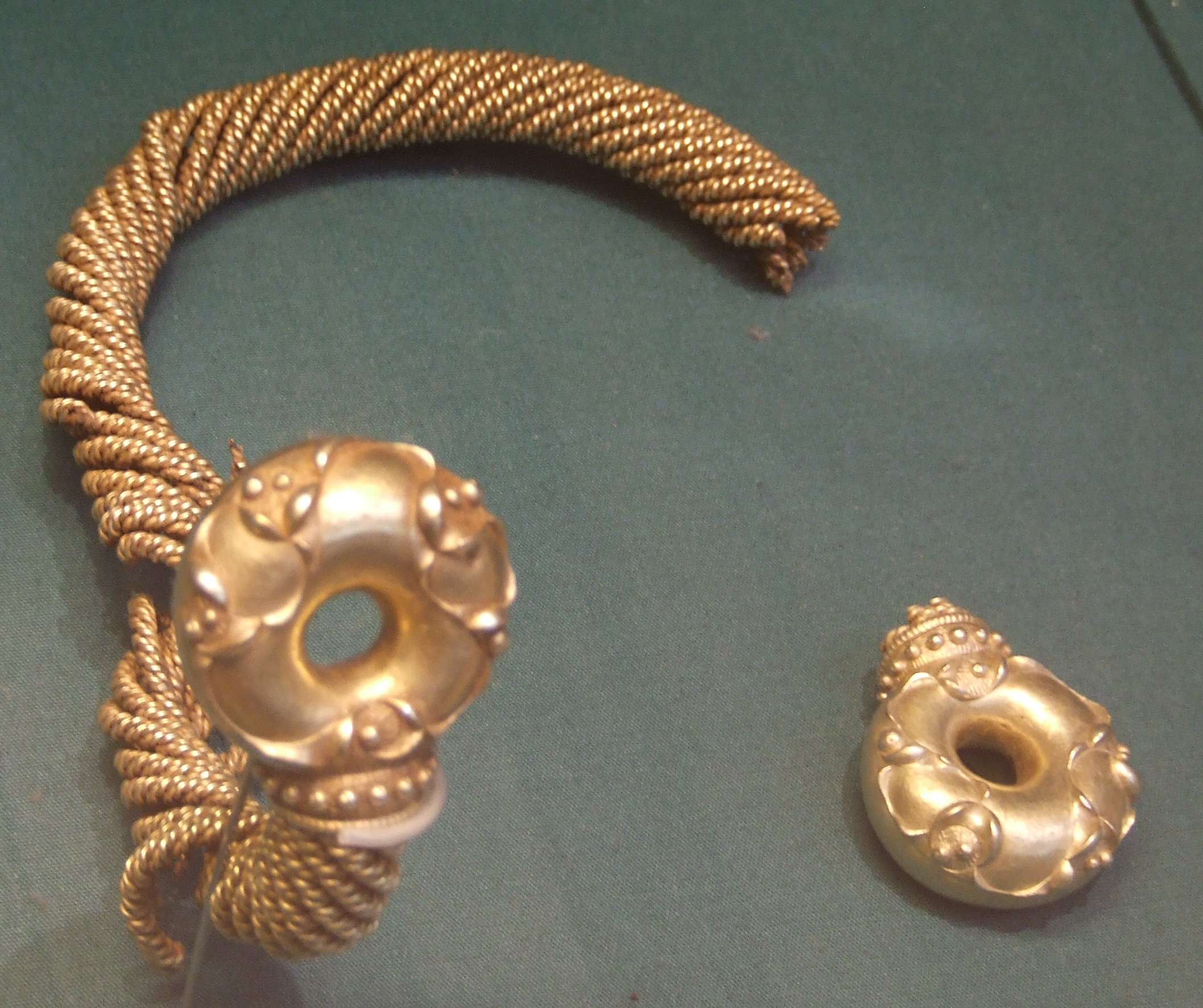
- Material: Gold
- Created: 200–50 BC
- Period/culture: Iron Age, La Tène
- Place: Sedgeford
- Present location: Room 50, British Museum, London
- Registration: 1968,1004.1

The Sedgeford Torc is a broken Iron Age gold torc found near the village of Sedgeford in Norfolk. The main part of the torc was found during harrowing of a field in 1965, and the missing terminal was found by Dr. Steve Hammond during fieldwork by the Sedgeford Historical and Archaeological Research Project in 2004. The torc is now displayed at the British Museum.

== Description ==
The torc dates from 200–50 BC and is made from twisted gold wires. Forty-eight 2mm wires were twisted in pairs to form 24 wires. Then three of these paired wires were twisted together in the opposite direction to make a rope (comprising six original wires). These eight thicker ropes were then twisted together to form the body of the torc. In total, 25 metres of gold wire was used to form the torc. The hollow gold terminals, in a ring shape, were cast using the lost wax method, and is decorated in the La Tène style with moulded raised decoration of trumpet voids and circles, highlighted with pellets and cold hammering. The torc is similar to the Great Torc from Snettisham and also to the Ipswich torcs, all of which are also in the British Museum. It is considered so similar to the Newark Torc, found in Newark-on-Trent in Nottinghamshire, that it might have been made by the same craftsman.

The torc was buried deliberately, and as such is considered a hoarded object. It may have been broken when it was buried, or broken at a later date by ploughing. It is thought to have been buried in about 75 BC.

== Discovery ==
The major part of the torc was found on 6 May 1965 in a field at West Hall Farm in Sedgeford, Norfolk by Dr Bernard G. Campbell the landowner, after the field had been harrowed. He saw the torc stuck to the harrow and immediately knew what it was. As the harrow only penetrated a few inches, it is thought that the torc had been brought to near the surface by earlier deep ploughing. The findspot is only two miles west of the site of the large Snettisham Hoard, which included many gold torcs. The torc was declared treasure trove during an inquest held at Sedgeford on 29 December 1966. The torc was acquired for the British Museum through the Duchy of Lancaster and with the assistance of the Christy Trust, and the finder, farmworker A. E. Middleton (landowner B. G. Campbell), was awarded the full market value of £3,300. The British Museum arranged for a replica to be made, to be displayed at the Norwich Castle Museum.

In Easter 2004 the missing terminal was found during an archaeological fieldwalking survey, using metal detectors, arranged by the Sedgeford Historical and Archaeological Research Project. The terminal was found by retired chemistry lecturer Dr. Steve Hammond about 400 metres from the findspot of the main body of the torc. The terminal was also declared treasure trove and purchased for the British Museum with assistance from The Art Fund. It has since been reunited with the rest of the Sedgeford Torc at the British Museum.

== See also ==
- Newark Torc
- Snettisham Hoard
- Stirling hoard
- Ipswich Hoard
