= Locher =

Locher is a surname, and may refer to:

- Carl Locher (1851–1915), Danish realist painter
- Cyrus Locher (1878–1929), Democratic politician from Ohio
- Dick Locher (1929–2017), Richard Earl Locher, cartoonist
- Eduard Locher (1840–1910), Swiss engineer, inventor and independent contractor
- Michael Locher (born 1969), Swiss musician
- Ralph S. Locher (1915–2004), Romanian-born American politician of the Democratic party
- Roger Locher (born 1946), F-4D Phantom weapons officer and pilot
- Steve Locher (born 1967), Swiss alpine skier

== See also ==
- Lochar (disambiguation)
