= Wickham Market Hoard =

Iron Age hoard of gold coins

Coordinates: 52.15°N 1.367°E

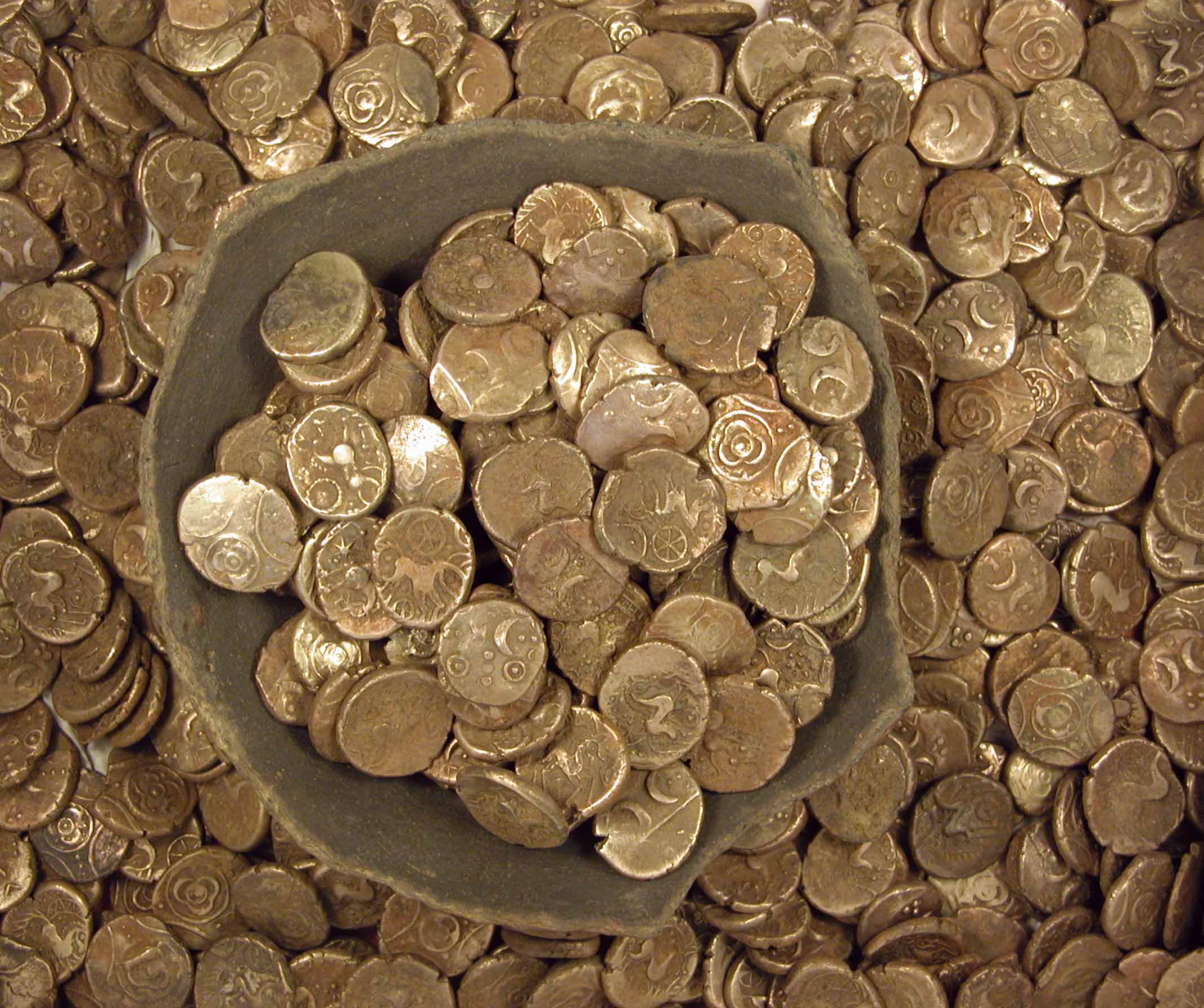
- Wickham Market Iron Age gold staters
- Material: Gold
- Size: 840 gold staters
- Period/culture: Iron Age
- Discovered: Wickham Market, Suffolk, March – October 2008

The Wickham Market Hoard is a hoard of 840 Iron Age gold staters found in a field at Dallinghoo near Wickham Market, Suffolk, England in March 2008 by car mechanic, Michael Darke using a metal detector. After excavation of the site, a total of 825 coins were found, and by the time the hoard was declared treasure trove, 840 coins had been discovered. The coins date from 40 BC to 15 AD.

The hoard was described as "the largest hoard of British Iron Age gold coins to be studied in its entirety", and was also significant in providing "a lot of new information about the Iron Age, and particularly East Anglia in the late Iron Age". It was the largest hoard of staters to be found since the Whaddon Chase Iron Age hoard in 1849.

In June 2011, the hoard was purchased by Ipswich Museum for the sum of £316,000.

== Discovery and excavation ==
=== Discovery ===
On 16 March 2008, a sixty-year-old car mechanic—who originally wanted to remain anonymous, but was later named as Michael Darke—found his first gold coin after twenty-five years of metal detecting in fields in the Wickham Market area. Darke identified the coin, via the internet, as a Freckenham stater—so called because of the hoard in which the type was first found in 1885.

A week later, in spite of snowfall since his previous trip to the field, and working in sleet, Darke found a further eight gold staters. After further searching, he remarked that his metal detector "suddenly went doolally" and that he "knew for sure [he] was standing right on top of a crock of gold."

Marking the spot with stones, he decided not to dig for the coins until the following night—saying "these coins have been waiting two thousand years for me to find them, so they can wait one more night for me" to explain why he had not pressed on with the extraction. With a spade, he dug out 774 more coins. The field had not been ploughed since 1980, and the ground had the consistency of clay, but previous agricultural work on the field had scattered the coins over a 5–10 m (16–33 ft) area after breaking the top of the black earthenware pot they had been buried in. Some coins were still inside the broken pot, and most were found 6–8 in (15–20 cm) under the ground.

After washing them in warm water, Darke gave the coins to the landowner, who reported the find to Suffolk County Council Archaeological Service.

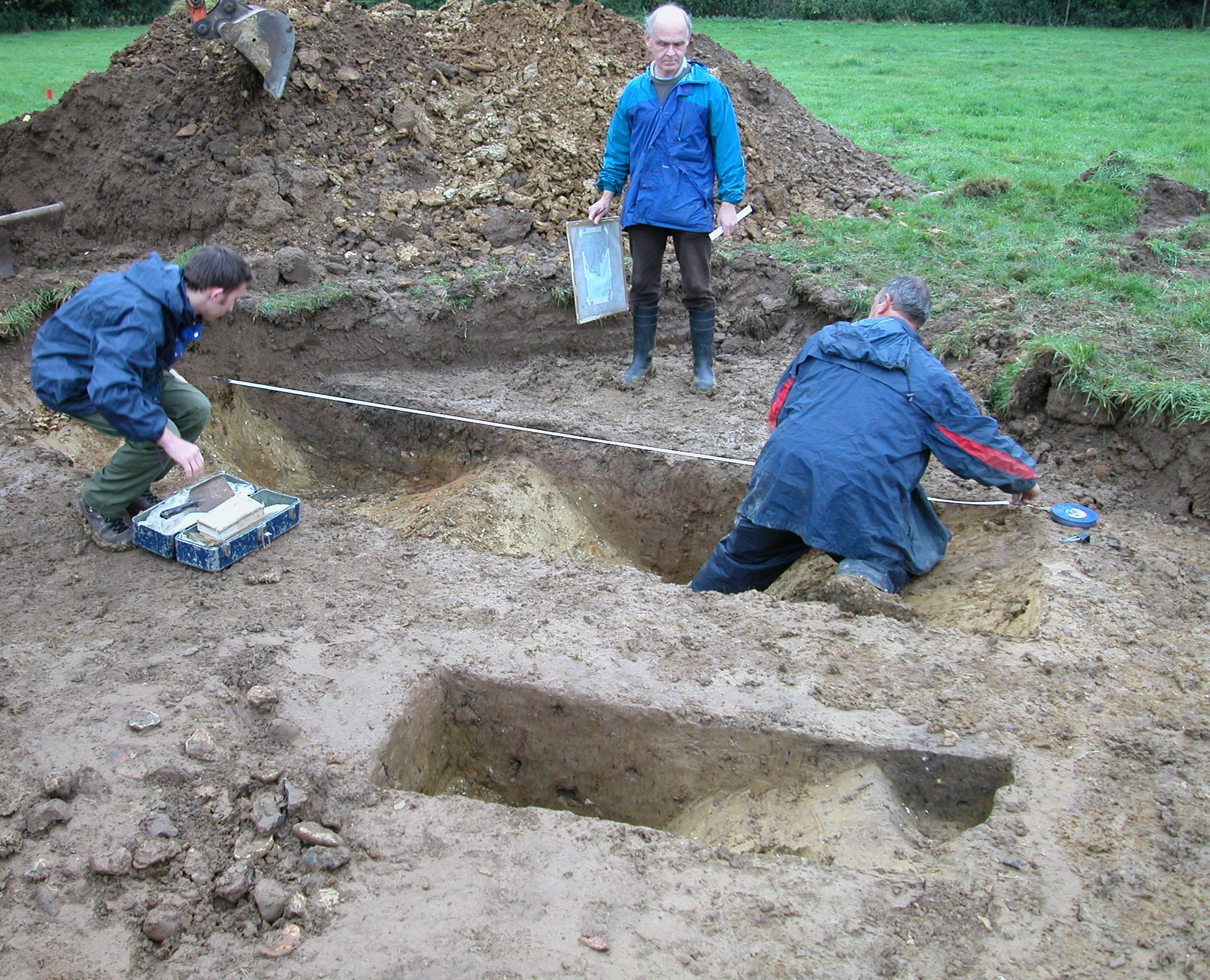
Recording ditches at Wickham Market hoard site

=== Excavation ===
The British Museum and Suffolk County Council funded excavation of the site between 14 and 15 October 2008, and found that the hoard had been buried in a ditched enclosure, possibly a "rectilinear religious enclosure". During this excavation, 42 further coins were discovered, making a total of 824 at that time. Analysis of the surrounding area, including intersecting ditches, dated the burial of the hoard at around 15 AD, which was concurrent with the minting of the latest coin found.

== Composition ==
The coins were declared treasure after a coroner's inquest in June 2009, by which time a total of 840 staters had been reported. All but two of the coins had been minted in East Anglia by the Iceni tribe; two were from Lincolnshire. The vast majority of the coins were of the Freckenham type, the same as Darke's initial find; there were a small number of Snettisham type—named after the hoard in which they were first discovered between 1987 and 1989; these were also the earliest struck coins in the hoard, dating between 40 and 30 BC.

The modern-day equivalent of the hoard's value was estimated at somewhere between £500,000 and £1,000,000. This figure was arrived at by using the cost of military service as a comparison: Dr John Sills stated, "[A] gold stater perhaps bought around a month’s service in the 3rd century BC and five gold staters an infantryman for the duration of a campaign in the 2nd century BC, with ten gold staters buying a cavalryman." It was also based on the observations of a previous find in Alton, Hampshire in 1996, when Dr Roger Bland and John Orna-Ornstein of the British Museum suggested a gold stater would be worth around £1,000 when minted.

The Freckenham staters were composed of an alloy mix of 40% copper, 20% silver and 40% gold, sometimes called "rose gold", but this was taken into account in the valuation. The collectors' guide, Spink's Coins of England (2009), valued each coin to a buyer at £250–£700, depending on condition. Each coin weighed just over 5 g (0.18 oz).

== Importance ==
The hoard was the largest number of Iron Age gold staters found since 1849, when between 450 and 800 to 2,000 were found in a field on Whaddon Chase near Milton Keynes by a farm worker.

Although it is not known why the hoard was buried, there are several theories including it being a votive hoard, or a communal hoard "collected and buried for the benefit of the community", either as a war chest for an impending threat or as a tribute payment to avert invasion.

Suffolk County Council Archaeological Service's Jude Plouviez said, "The discovery is important because it highlights probable political, economic and religious importance of an area", and that this particular find gave "a lot of new information about the Iron Age, and particularly East Anglia in the late Iron Age".

Ian Leins, then curator of Iron Age coins at the British Museum, remarked, "It is the largest hoard of British Iron Age gold coins to be studied in its entirety."

== Display ==
In June 2011 it was announced that the hoard had been acquired for £316,000 by Ipswich Museum, with the help of a grant of £225,900 from the Heritage Lottery Fund and £40,000 from the Art Fund. The hoard would be put on permanent display at Ipswich Museum. The £316,000 would be shared between the landowner, Cliff Green, on whose farm in Dallinghoo the hoard was found, and the metal detectorists, Michael Darke and Keith Lewis, who found the hoard. with a half share going to Green, and a quarter share each going to Darke and Lewis.

== Other hoards ==
In 1984, a hoard of 1,587 Romano-British coins were found in a pot in the Wickham Market area, dating from 270 AD.

== See also ==
- List of hoards in Great Britain
