= Stirling torcs =

Archaeological find in Stirling, Scotland

Coordinates: 56.17105°N 4.047779°W

Stirling Torcs
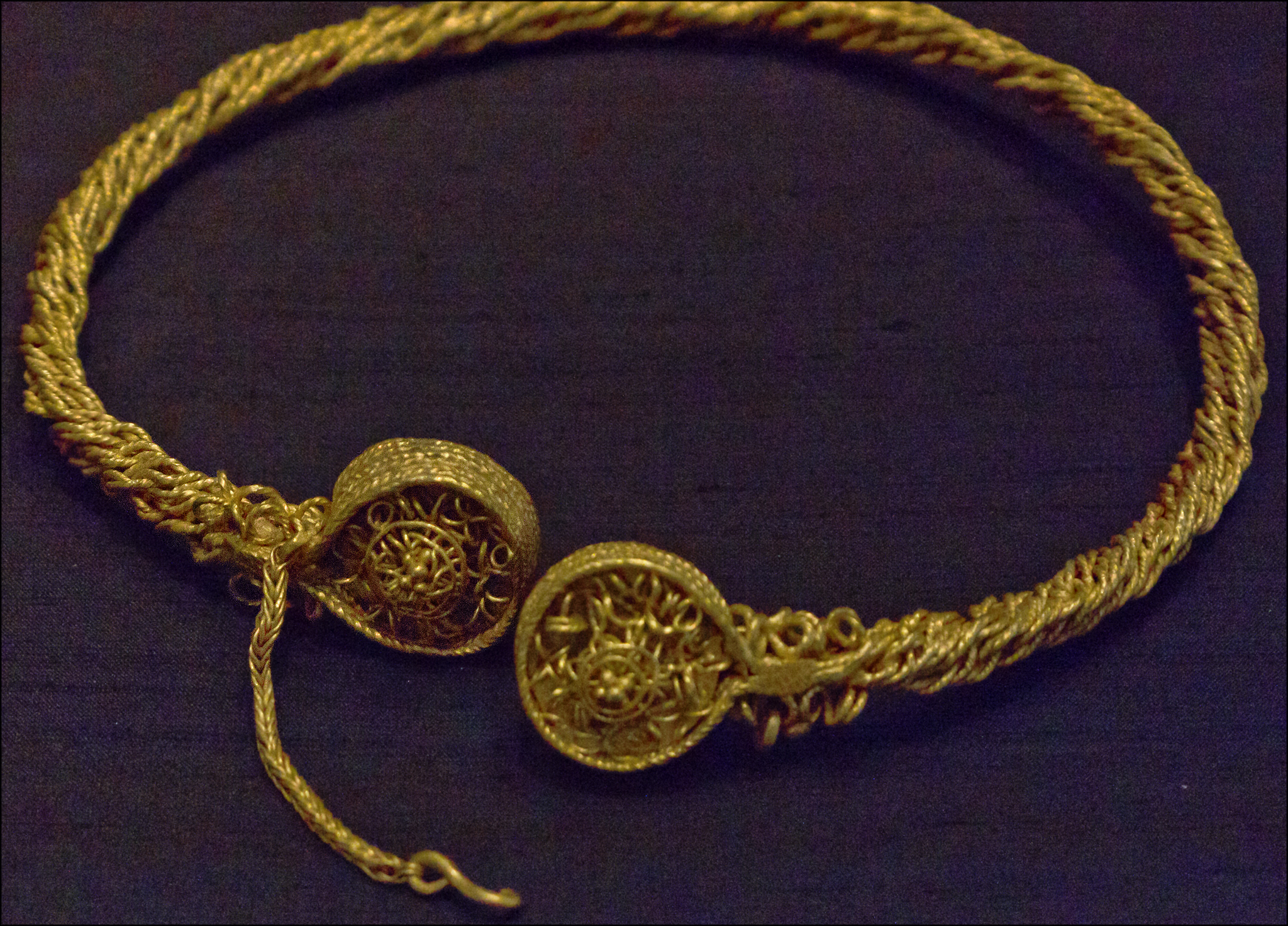
- One of the intricate torcs
- Material: Gold
- Period/culture: c.300-100 BC
- Discovered: 28 September 2009
- Place: Blair Drummond, Perthshire, Scotland
- Present location: National Museum of Scotland

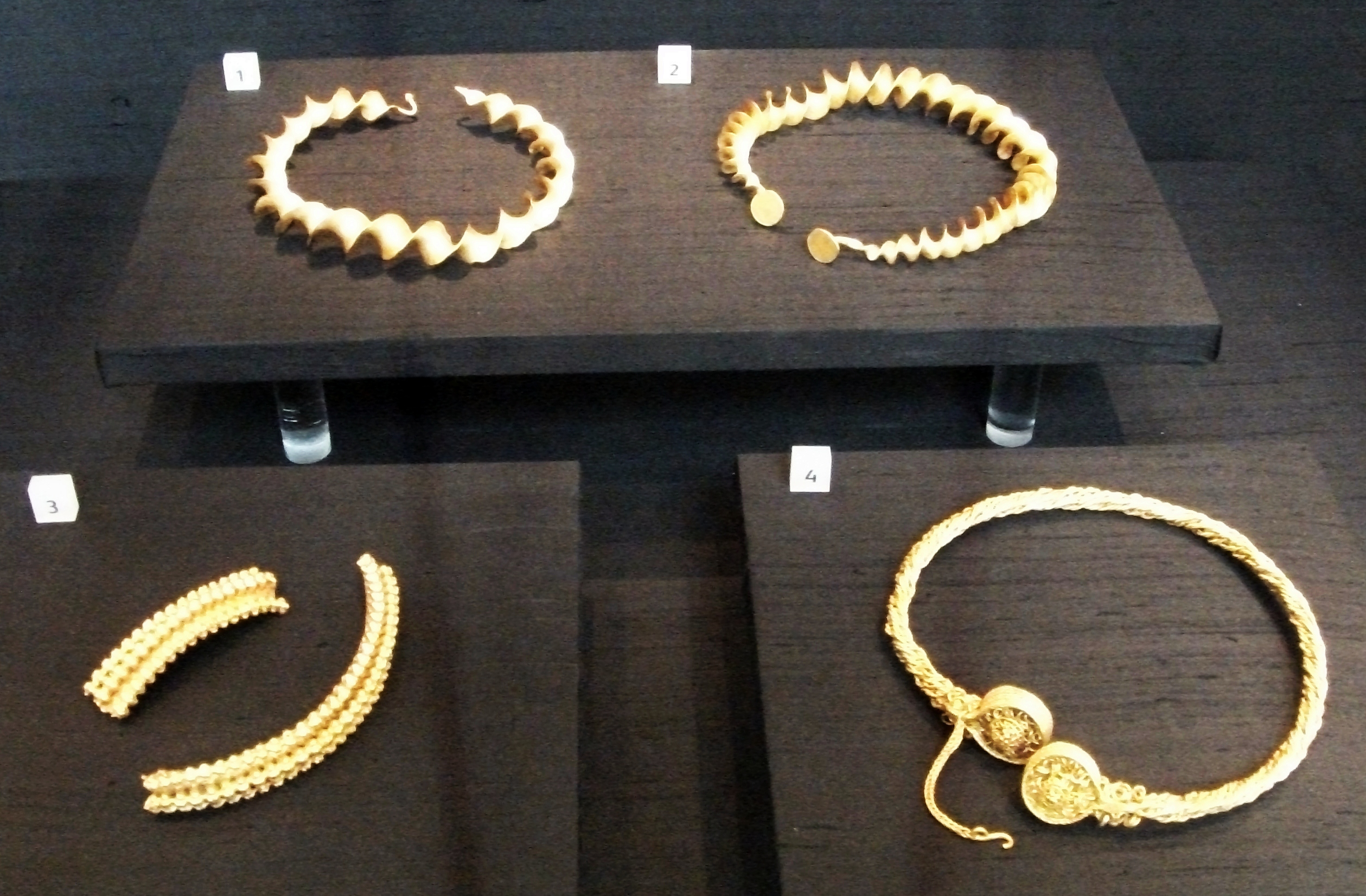
The set of four torcs discovered in Perthshire, Scotland in 2009

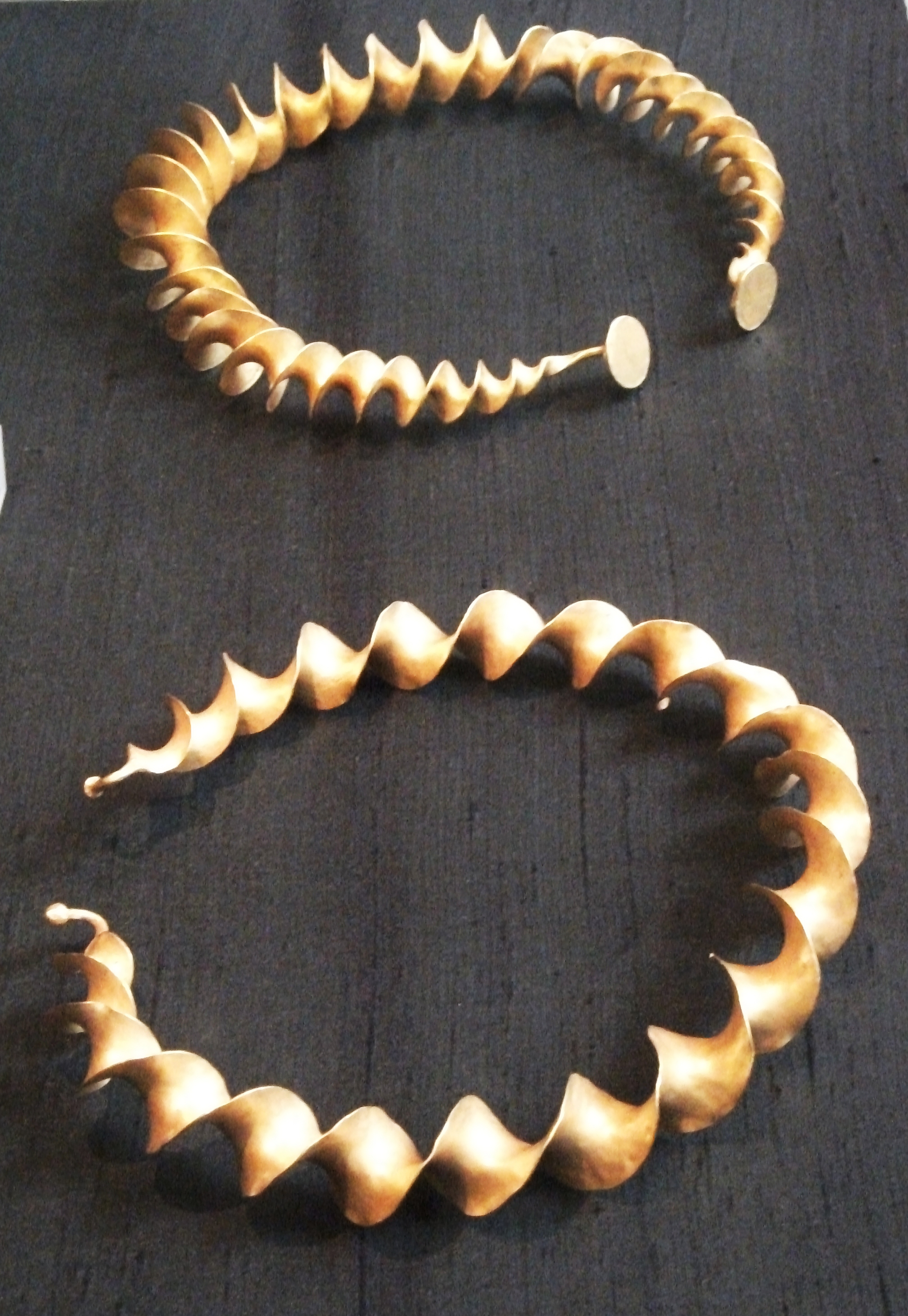
1 and 2) The two twisted torcs

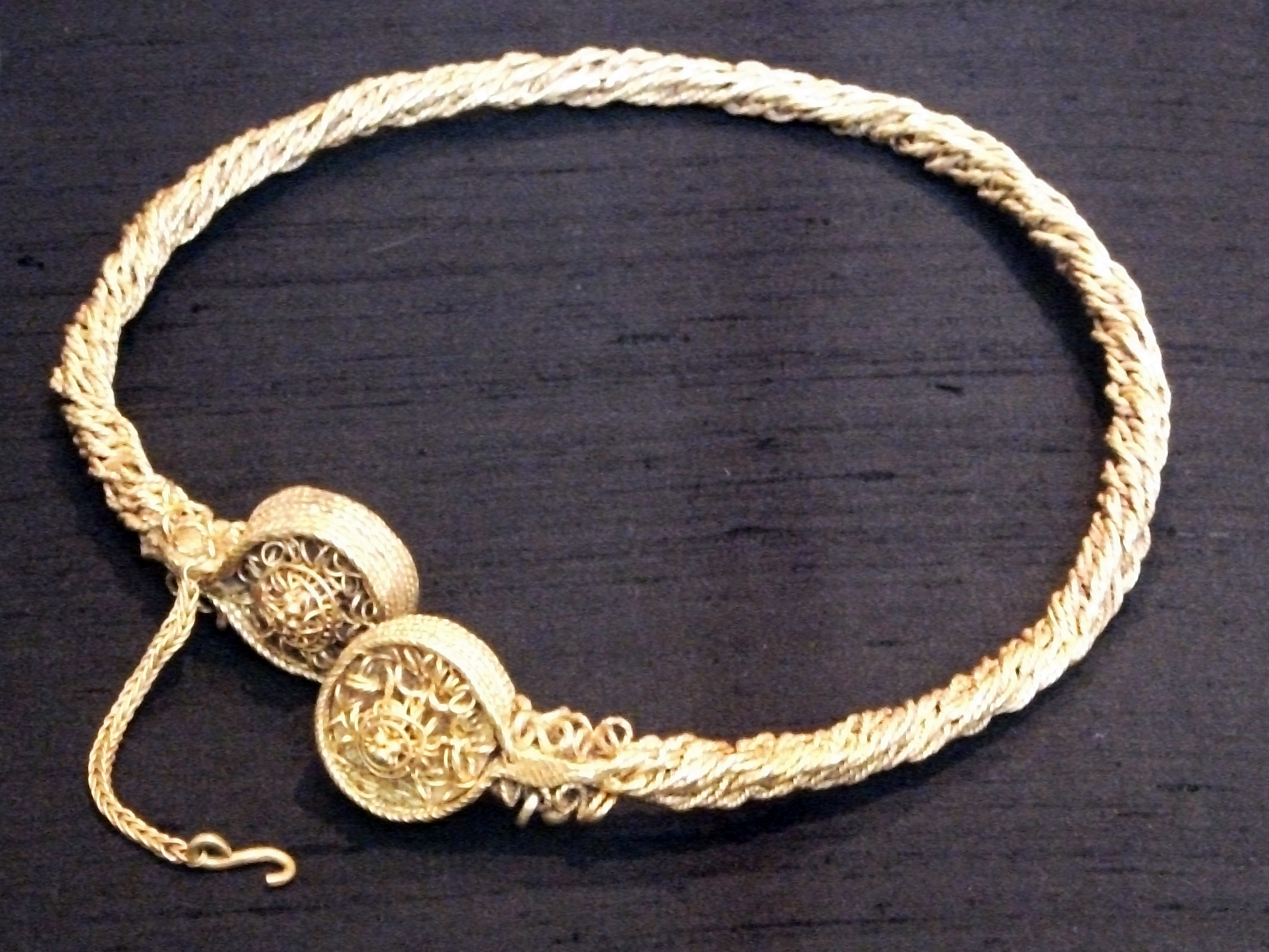
4) A golden torc made from eight gold wires twisted together, intricately decorated terminals with a safety chain. Manufactured between 300–100 BC

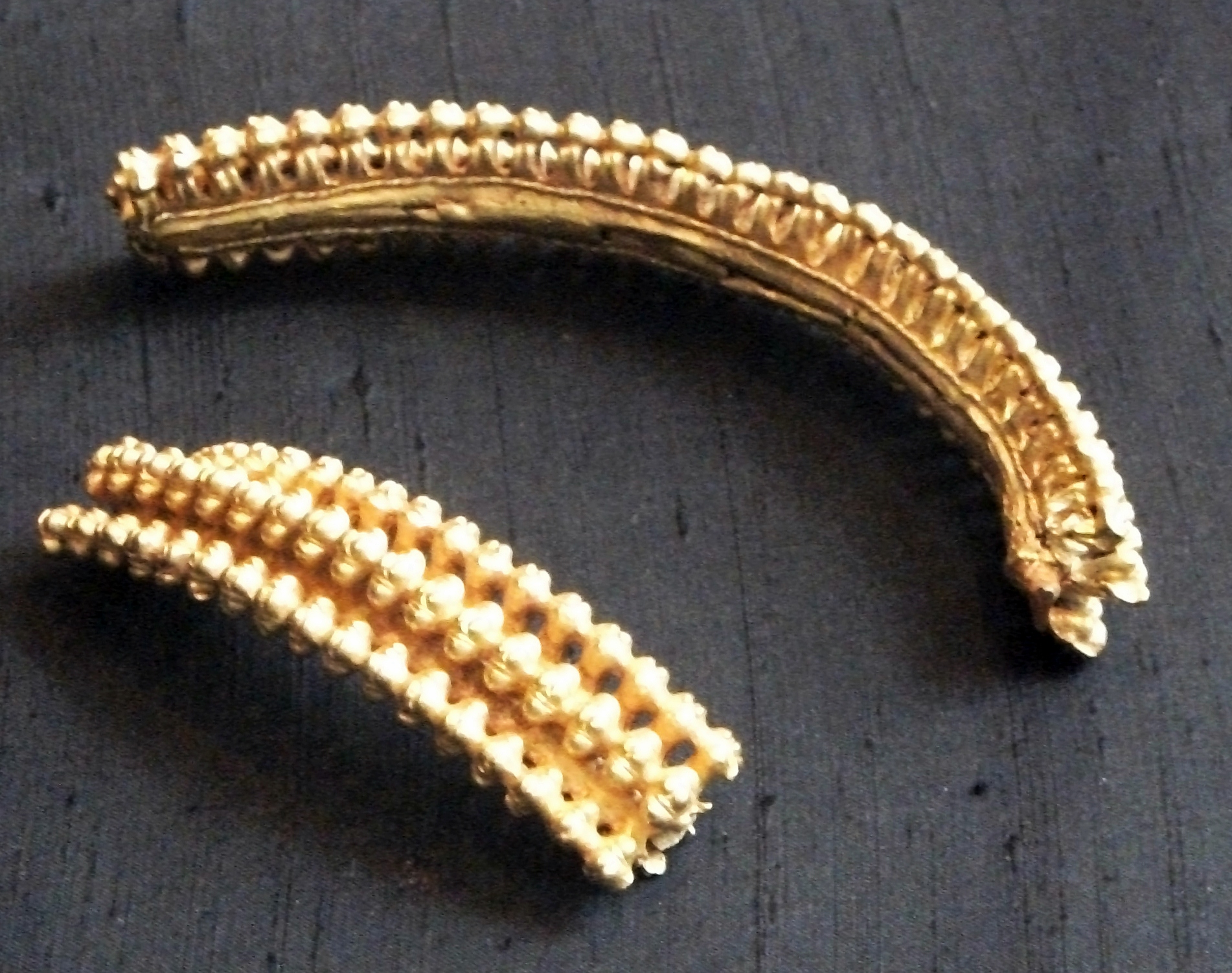
3) Fragments of torc apparently from southwestern France

The Stirling torcs make up a hoard of four gold Iron Age torcs, a type of necklace, all of which date to between 300 and 100 BC and which were buried deliberately at some point in antiquity. They were found by a metal detectorist in a field near Blair Drummond, Perthshire, Scotland on 28 September 2009. The hoard has been described as the most significant discovery of Iron Age metalwork in Scotland and is said to be of international significance. The torcs were valued at £462,000, and after a public appeal were acquired for the National Museums of Scotland in March 2011.

== Discovery ==
The finder was a novice metal detectorist, David Booth, who found the torcs on his first treasure-hunting outing, using a basic model metal detector. Having identified an area he considered to be of good potential, Booth obtained the landowner's permission to search on his land.

I parked up and got the metal detector out. There was an area of flat ground behind the car, and I thought, I’ll just scan this first, before I head out into the field. Literally about seven steps behind where I had parked, I found them.

Booth took the torcs home and washed them in water. After researching them on the internet, he completed a form on the Scottish Treasure Trove website and sent a photograph to the Scottish Treasure Trove Unit at the National Museum of Scotland in Edinburgh. Dr Fraser Hunter said he "almost fell off [his] seat" when he first saw photographs of the discovery the next morning, and members of staff had arrived at the site within three hours. The subsequent archaeological excavation at the site exposed the remains of a wooden roundhouse but found no more artefacts.

== The torcs ==
All four torcs were buried together, some 15–20 centimetres (6–8 in) below the surface. Subsequent archaeological investigations determined that the torcs had originally been buried within a roundhouse, a prehistoric circular building. This building may have had religious significance, as hoard finds tend to be either votive offerings to the gods, or items of great value that had been hidden in time of unrest or war, and because the building did not seem to have features like a hearth associated with a dwelling.

All four torcs date to between 300 and 100 BC, they are highly and unexpectedly varied in form and style which greatly adds to the significance of the find. Two twisted ribbon torcs (numbered 1–2 in the photo of the display), in perfect condition, are elegant and relatively simple in design. They are fashioned from a flat strip of gold which has then been twisted, and represent a local style of jewellery, originating equally from Scotland and Ireland, and going back to the Late Bronze Age. One has plain hooked terminals while the other has more decorative disc terminals.

The third torc is broken, with only half of the original artefact surviving in two fragments. It is a tubular annular torc, which would have had a hinge and catch. It is of ornate design compared to the ribbon torcs, and experts have identified it as a type originating from the Toulouse area in southern France. It is the first of its kind to have been found in Britain.

The fourth torc is a looped terminal torc, complete and in good condition. It is made from eight gold wires twisted together. It has intricately decorated terminals and has a short length of safety chain. It has been described by Dr Fraser Hunter, Iron Age and Roman curator at the National Museum of Scotland, as a remarkable hybrid of Mediterranean craftsmanship and more traditional Iron Age motifs. This might have been made for a local chieftain by a craftsman who had learned his craft in the Mediterranean region, and with the third torc suggests significant links between Scotland and Southern Europe. There are no directly comparable other artefacts. The last significant find of torcs in Scotland was in 1857, when gold ribbon torcs were found on Law Farm, Moray. The eclecticism of the styles and origins is comparable to that of the objects in the Broighter Hoard from Northern Ireland, probably of a slightly later period.

== After discovery ==
Following the completion of the archaeological excavations, the torcs were made public on 4 November 2009 when they were shown to the press in Edinburgh by Booth and museum staff at the National Museum of Scotland.

According to Scottish Treasure Trove laws, the crown can claim any archaeological objects found in Scotland. Finders have no ownership rights and must report any objects to Scotland's Treasure Trove Unit. Booth is entitled to a reward equal to the value of the torcs. Dr David Caldwell of the Scottish Treasure Trove Unit said that the torcs would "definitely" stay in Scotland. In October 2010 the torcs were valued at £462,000 by the Scottish Archaeological Finds Allocation Panel, and the crown stated it would allocate the torcs to National Museums Scotland if the museum made an ex-gratia payment of £462,000 to the finder, David Booth; National Museums Scotland had until April 2011 to raise the required sum of money. By March 2011 the amount was raised by a public appeal and significant grants by the Art Fund and the National Heritage Memorial Fund, and the hoard was acquired.

== See also ==
- Newark Torc
- Sedgeford Torc
- Ipswich Hoard
- Leekfrith torcs
- Staffordshire Hoard
- Vale of York Hoard
- List of hoards in Britain
