= Newark Torc =

Iron Age gold alloy torc

Coordinates: 53.080827°N 0.834374°W

The Newark Torc
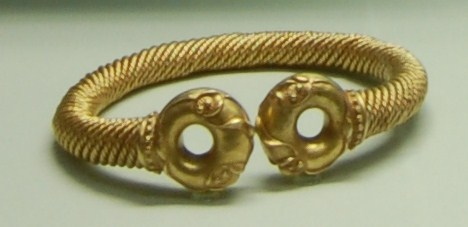
- Material: Gold
- Created: 200 BC–50 BC
- Period/culture: Iron Age, La Tène
- Place: Newark-on-Trent
- Present location: National Civil War Centre, Newark

The Newark Torc is a complete Iron Age gold alloy torc found by a metal detectorist on the outskirts of Newark-on-Trent, Nottinghamshire, England, in February 2005.

The torc is made from electrum, an alloy of gold, silver and copper, weighs 700 grammes (1.5 lbs) and is 20 cm in diameter. The body is formed from rolled gold alloy wires, which had then been plaited into eight thin ropes then twisted together. The terminals are ring-shaped and bear floral and point-work designs. The torc was probably made in Norfolk. It is closely similar to one found at Sedgeford, north Norfolk – so much so that one expert has suggested that they might have been made by the same craftsman. The torc had been buried in a pit, and as such is considered a hoarded item rather than a stray loss. The reason for its deposition is uncertain, although Jeremy Hill, head of research at the British Museum, speculated that it might have been buried "possibly as an offering to the gods."

"[It is] probably the most significant find of Iron Age Celtic gold jewellery made in the last 50 years ... [it] shows an incredibly high level of technological skill in working the metal and a really high level of artistry. It is an extraordinary object." Jeremy Hill.

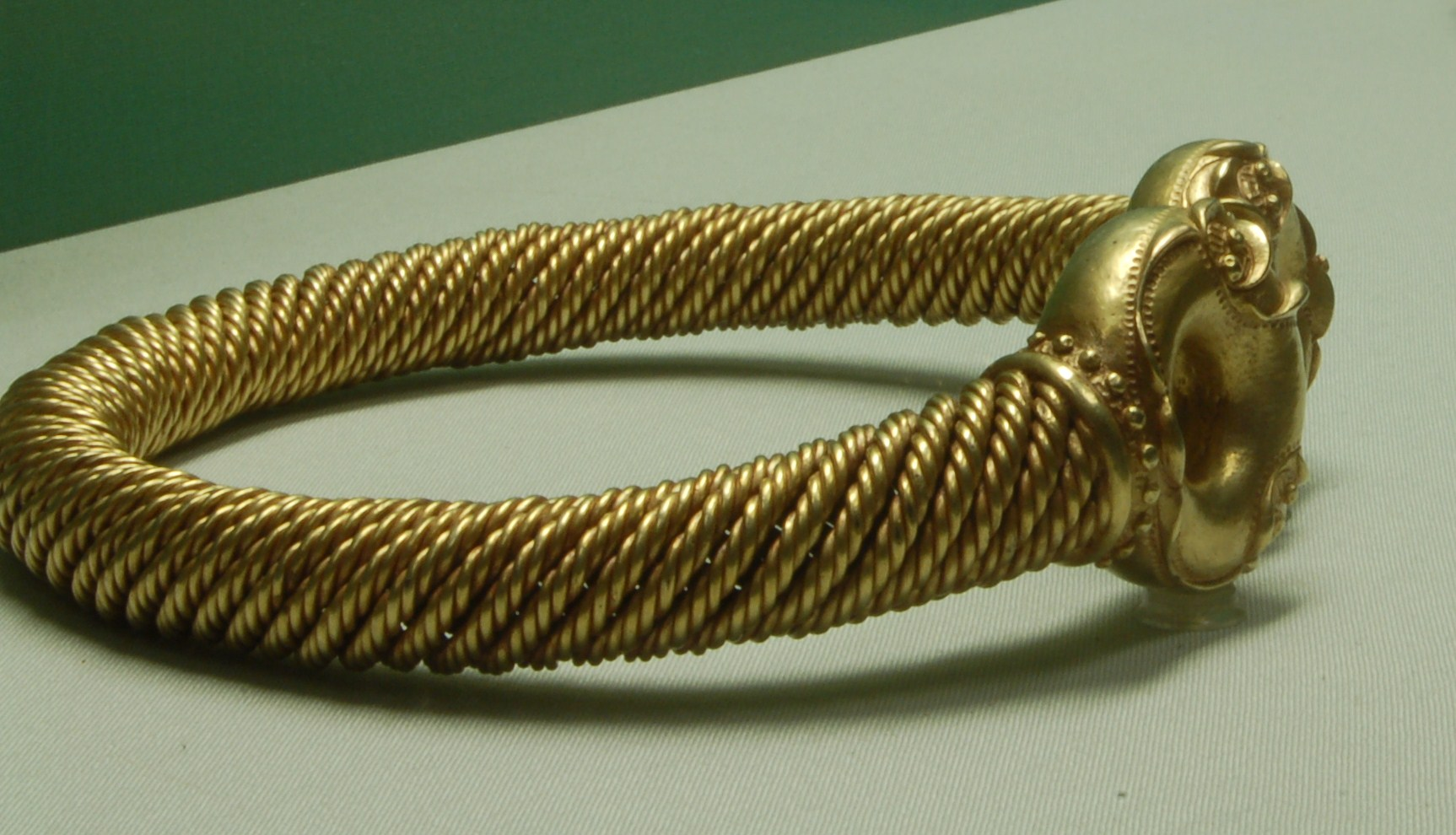
Another view with a sharper photo

The torc has been dated to between 250 and 50 BC, and is thought to have been buried in around 75 BC. The torc was found by Maurice Richardson, a tree surgeon, while he was metal detecting in a field.

The torc was declared treasure trove in 2005 and purchased in 2006 for Newark's Millgate Museum, with significant grant aid from the National Heritage Memorial Fund.

== See also ==
- Snettisham Hoard
- Stirling hoard
- Ipswich Hoard
- Leekfrith torcs
- Lochar Moss Torc
