= Julia Farley =

British archaeologist

Julia Farley FSA

Academic work
- Discipline: Archaeology
- Sub-discipline: Iron Age archaeology Roman archaeology
- Institutions: University of Leicester; British Museum

Julia Farley is a British archaeologist specialising in Iron Age and Roman metalwork. She is the Curator of the European Iron Age & Roman Conquest Period collections at the British Museum.

== Career ==
Farley studied archaeology and anthropology at the University of Cambridge, graduating with a Bachelor of Arts (BA) degree in 2007. She then studied archaeology at Cardiff University, graduating with a Master of Arts (MA) in 2008. She undertook postgraduate research at the University of Leicester, completing her Doctor of Philosophy (PhD) degree in 2012 with a thesis titled "At the Edge of Empire: Iron Age and early Roman metalwork in the East Midlands".

Following her PhD, she worked at the British Museum for a year as curator of European Iron Age collections before returning to the University of Leicester in 2013 for a three-year Leverhulme Early Career Fellowship. She returned to the British Museum in 2016. She has contributed an article to The Conversation news outlet on metal detecting.

Farley was elected as a Fellow of the Society of Antiquaries of London on 12 December 2016.

== Select publications ==
- Farley, J. 2011. "The deposition of miniature weaponry in Iron Age Lincolnshire", Pallas. Revue d'études antiques 86, 97–121. doi:10.4000/pallas.2108
- Farley, J. and Haselgrove, C. 2013. "La conquête romaine et le monnayage en Bretagne insulaire", Dossiers de l'Archéologie 360, 82–5.
- Farley, J. 2014. "Some advice for treasure hunters and culture ministers", The Conversation (17 June 2017)
- Farley, J., Parfitt, K., and Richardson, A. 2014. "A Late Iron Age Helmet Burial from Bridge, near Canterbury, Kent", Proceedings of the Prehistoric Society 80, 379–388.
- Farley, J. and Hunter, F. (eds) 2015. Celts: art and identity. British Museum Press, London. ISBN 9780714128368.
