= Sedgeford =

Village in the English county of Norfolk

Coordinates: 52°54′00″N 0°32′38″E

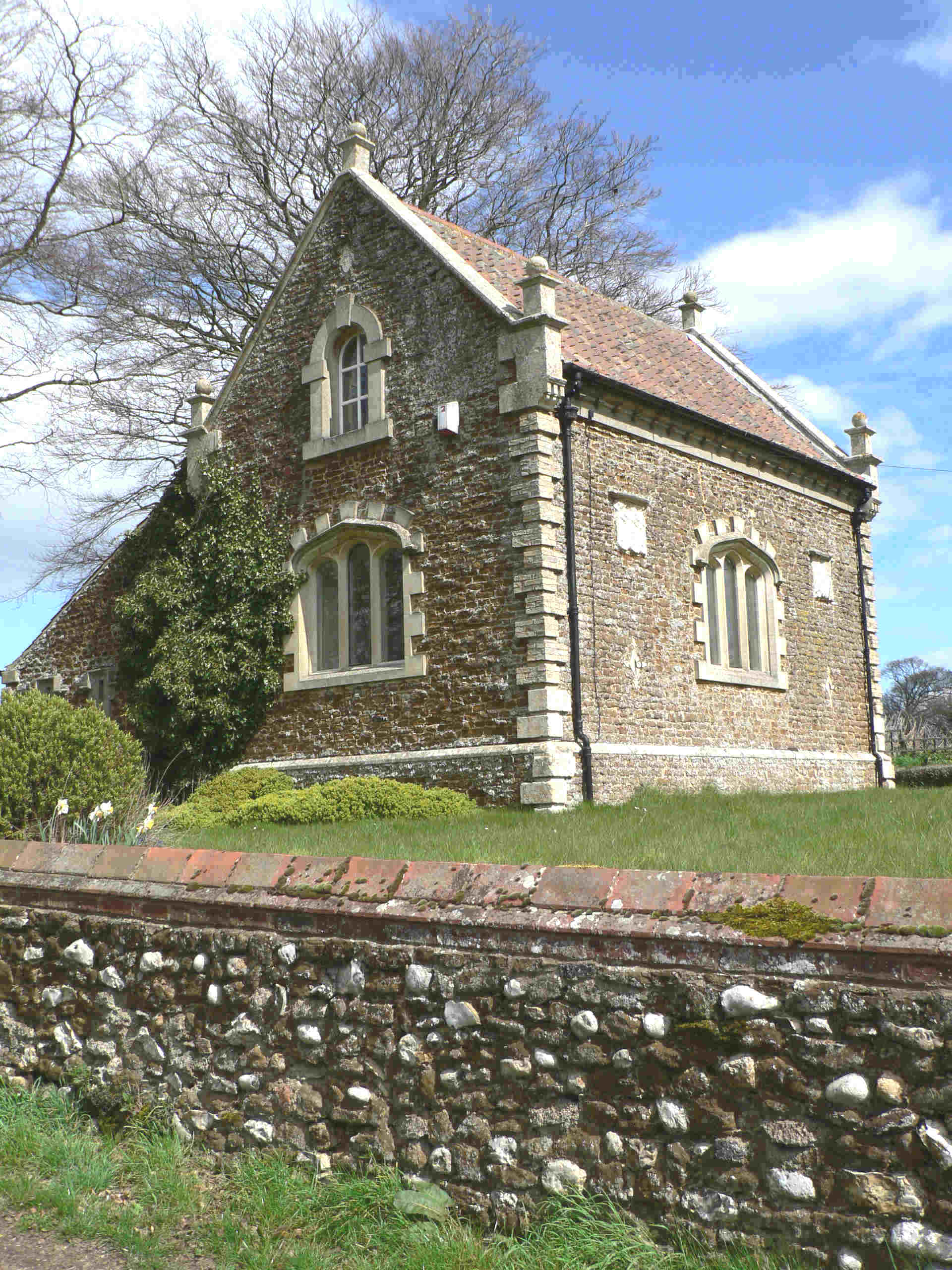
- Magazine, the old gunpowder store at Sedgeford

- Location within Norfolk
- Area: 6.6 sq mi (17 km^{2})
- Population: 613 (2011)
  - Density: 93/sq mi (36/km^{2})
- OS grid reference: TF712366
  - London: 100 mi (160 km)
- Civil parish: Sedgeford
- District: King's Lynn and West Norfolk
- Shire county: Norfolk
- Region: East
- Country: England
- Sovereign state: United Kingdom
- Post town: HUNSTANTON
- Postcode district: PE36
- Police: Norfolk
- Fire: Norfolk
- Ambulance: East of England

Sedgeford is a village and civil parish in the English county of Norfolk, about 5 miles south of the North Sea and 3 miles (4.8 km) east of the Wash. It is 36 miles northwest of Norwich.

Its area of 6.6 square miles (17 km^{2}) had a population, including Fring, of 613 at the 2011 Census. It was estimated to have a population of 601 in 2019. It belongs to the local governance of King's Lynn and West Norfolk district. It lies in a farming valley with main crops of barley, wheat and sugar beet, in a belt of chalk with the small Docking River running through.

== History ==
The village's name is assumed to mean as "Secci's ford" as recorded in the Domesday Book of 1086. One of its features was a church built of flint and stone, is Anglo-Saxon in origin. It has one of the 124 round towers in Norfolk.

There is an archaeological evidence of people living there in ancient times—the remains of Roman villas, pottery, a gold torc from the Iron Age, and Neolithic flint tools found in fields and gardens. Furthermore, it is crossed by two ancient roads, the prehistoric Icknield Way and the Roman-period Peddars Way.

=== Peddars Way ===
Sunset across Sedgeford to the Norfolk coast from Magazine Wood Peddars Way

Peddars Way, an ancient Roman road, runs through the top end of the village and leads directly onto the Norfolk Coast Path. After Fring, the national trail passes through the hamlet of Littleport, a small row of higgledy-piggledy cottages that now forms part of the main village. The route takes walkers past a local landmark now called the Magazine Cottage, built in the 17th century by the Le Strange family during the civil war as a gunpowder magazine. Legend has it that a secret tunnel ran from the old armoury going to the church in the heart of the village. Today, this small part of Peddars Way derives its name from this historical building, with Magazine Wood and Magazine Farm just a few steps away.

All these properties were once owned by William Newcombe-Baker, a local landowner whose estate covered much of the land round the village. He was a founder member of NORMAC, the Norfolk machinery body that brought modern mechanisation to arable farming in the 20th century East Anglia. Magazine Wood was rebuilt in 2000. From a high vantage point on Peddars Way, the sun can be seen setting over the sea to the west of this point – one of the few places this is possible on the eastern side of Great Britain.

Peddars Way passes Magazine Wood and crosses the disused West Norfolk Junction Railway. Sedgeford railway station lay on the line between Wells and King's Lynn, but closed to passengers in 1952 and to goods in 1964.

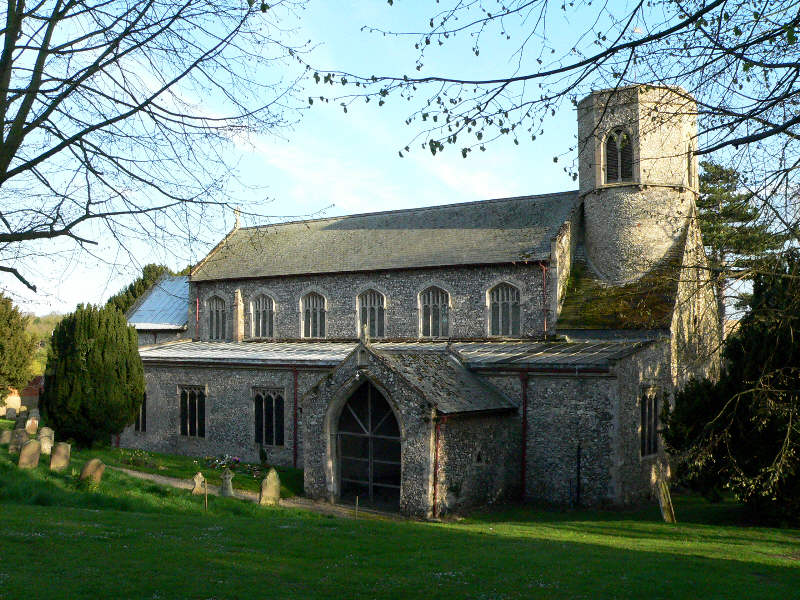
Sedgeford St. Mary

The parish church, Sedgeford St Mary, is one of 124 round-tower churches in Norfolk.

=== Archaeological project ===
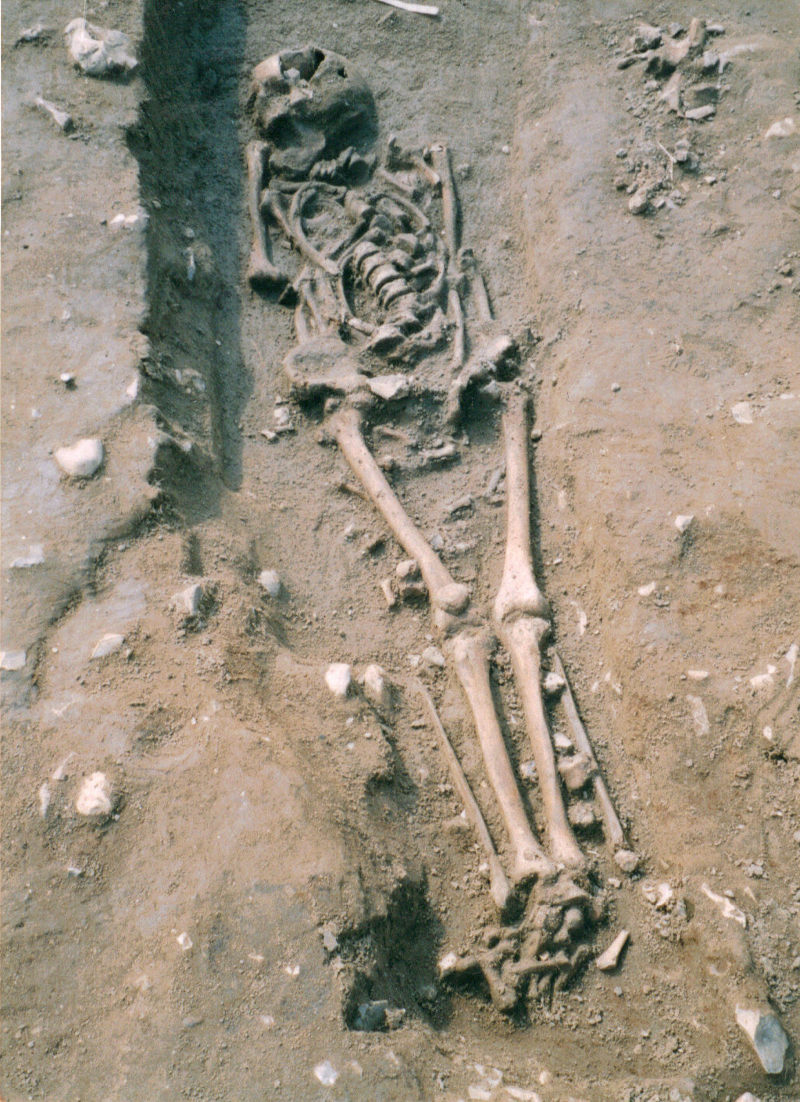
Anglo Saxon era skeleton found at the Sedgeford Digsite in Norfolk, 2005.

The Sedgeford Historical and Archaeological Research Project (SHARP) was established in 1996 to reconstruct the story of human settlement in the parish. Initially, it focused on the Anglo-Saxon cemetery located to the south of the modern village, but it is an ongoing project expanding to many other sites in the parish.

== Sports ==
The village has an associated football team, Sedgeford FC.

== Bibliography ==
- Website 1643 Civil War in Lincolnshire and Sir Hamon LeStrange
- Neil Faulkner et al., eds, 2014, Digging Sedgeford: A People's Archaeology. Poppyland Publishing. ISBN 978-1909796089
- Garry Rossin (2018) Sedgeford Aerodrome and the aerial conflict over North West Norfolk during the First World War. Poppyland Publishing. ISBN 978-1909796423
