= Snettisham Hoard =

Iron Age treasure found in England

Coordinates: 52.881977°N 0.508712°E

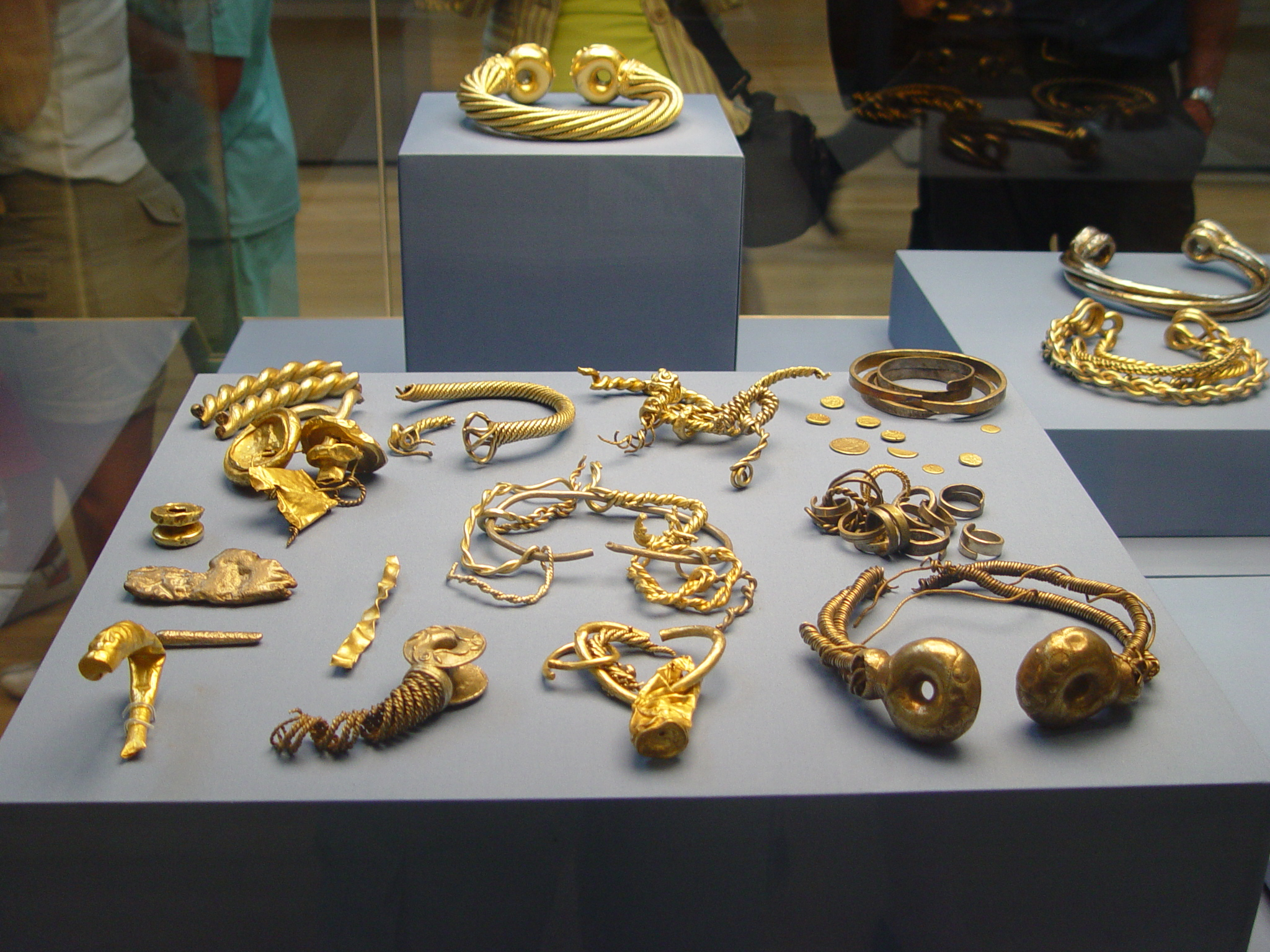
- The Hoard in the British Museum
- Material: Gold
- Created: about 70 BC
- Discovered: Snettisham in 1948–73
- Present location: British Museum; Norwich Castle

The Snettisham Hoard or Snettisham Treasure is a series of discoveries of Iron Age precious metal, found in the Snettisham area of the English county of Norfolk between 1948 and 1992.

== Iron age hoard ==
The hoard consists of metal, jet and more than 150 gold/silver/copper alloy torc fragments, more than 70 of which form complete torcs, dating from about 70 BC. The fairly precise dating comes from French coins discovered with the torcs. Probably the most famous item from the hoard is the Great Torc from Snettisham, which is now held by the British Museum. Though the origins are unknown, it is of a high enough quality to have been royal treasure of the Iceni.

Recent electron microscopy research by the British Museum reveals the wear patterns in the torcs, the chemical composition of the metal and the cut marks that reduced many of the torcs to fragments. One hypothesis suggests the deliberate destruction of valuable items was a form of votive offering.

The finds are deposited in Norwich Castle Museum and the British Museum. The hoard was ranked as number 4 in the list of British archaeological finds selected by experts at the British Museum for the 2003 BBC Television documentary, Our Top Ten Treasures, presented by Adam Hart-Davis.

Similar specimens are the Sedgeford Torc, found in 1965, and the Newark Torc, found in 2005, as well as the six torcs from the Ipswich Hoard found in 1968–69.

== Romano-British hoard ==
In 1985 there was also a find of Romano-British jewellery and raw materials buried in a clay pot in AD 155, the Snettisham Jeweller's Hoard. Though it has no direct connection with the nearby Iron Age finds, it may be evidence of a long tradition of gold- and silver-working in the area.

== See also ==
- List of hoards in Britain
- Iceni
- Celtic Britain
