= Frasne (disambiguation) =

Frasne is a commune in the Doubs department in the Franche-Comté region in eastern France. Frasne may also refer to:

- Frasne-les-Meulières, a commune in the Jura department in Franche-Comté in eastern France
- Frasne-le-Château, a commune in the Haute-Saône department in the region of Franche-Comté in eastern France

See also

- Gare de Frasne, a railway station located in Frasne on the Dijon–Vallorbe railway and Frasne–Les Verrières railway
- Frasnes (disambiguation)
