= Frasnes =

Frasnes is the name of several settlements in south-western Belgium:

- Frasnes-lez-Anvaing, a Walloon municipality located in the province of Hainaut
- Frasnes-lez-Buissenal, a village in Frasnes-lez-Anvaing
- Frasnes-lez-Couvin, a village in Couvin, province of Namur
- Frasnes-lez-Gosselies, a village in Les Bons Villers, a Walloon municipality in the province of Hainaut, site of a conflict in 1815 Waterloo campaign

== See also ==
- Frasnes Hoard, unearthed in 1864 by foresters digging out the roots of a tree near Frasnes-lez-Buissenal
- Frasnian, a faunal stages in the Late Devonian period, named after Frasnes-lez-Couvin
