= Frasnes Hoard =

The Frasnes Hoard was accidentally unearthed in 1864 by foresters digging out the roots of a tree near Frasnes-lez-Buissenal in Hainaut, Belgium. The torcs and some other pieces are now in the Metropolitan Museum of Art in New York.

Along with at least eighty uninscribed coins of types often found in Gaul and Britain and associated with the Belgic tribes of Morini and Nervii, which were dated by John Evans to ca. 80 BC, the hoard discovered at Frasnes also contained two characteristically Gallic Late La Tène style gold torcs, one plain with flattened-ball terminals, the other with repoussé decoration of a frontal bull's head among raised facetted scrolls some of which manifested a design repertory comparable to finds in Britain. The torc was constructed of sheet gold over an iron ring wrapped in a hard cement. There was also a ring "nearly 1 5/8 inches [41 mm] in diameter", too large in diameter to be a finger ring, yet too small to be a bracelet or armband; it had continuous granular ornament of globules of gold soldered together round into outer face.
