= Acropole Tomb =

Achaemenide burial

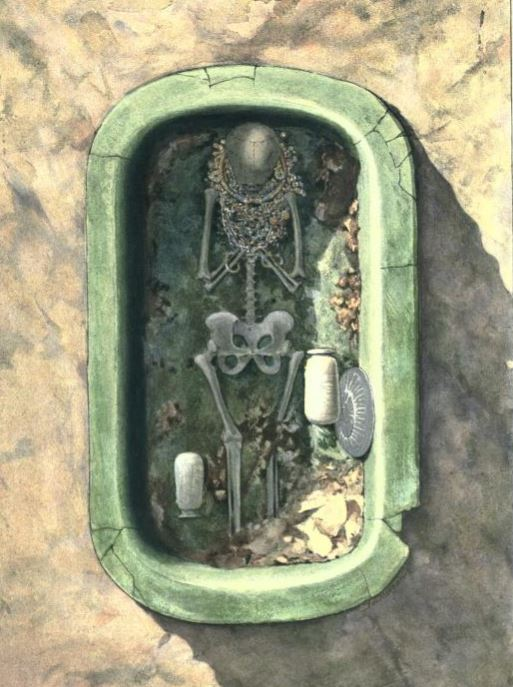
The grave as it appears in the exacvation report

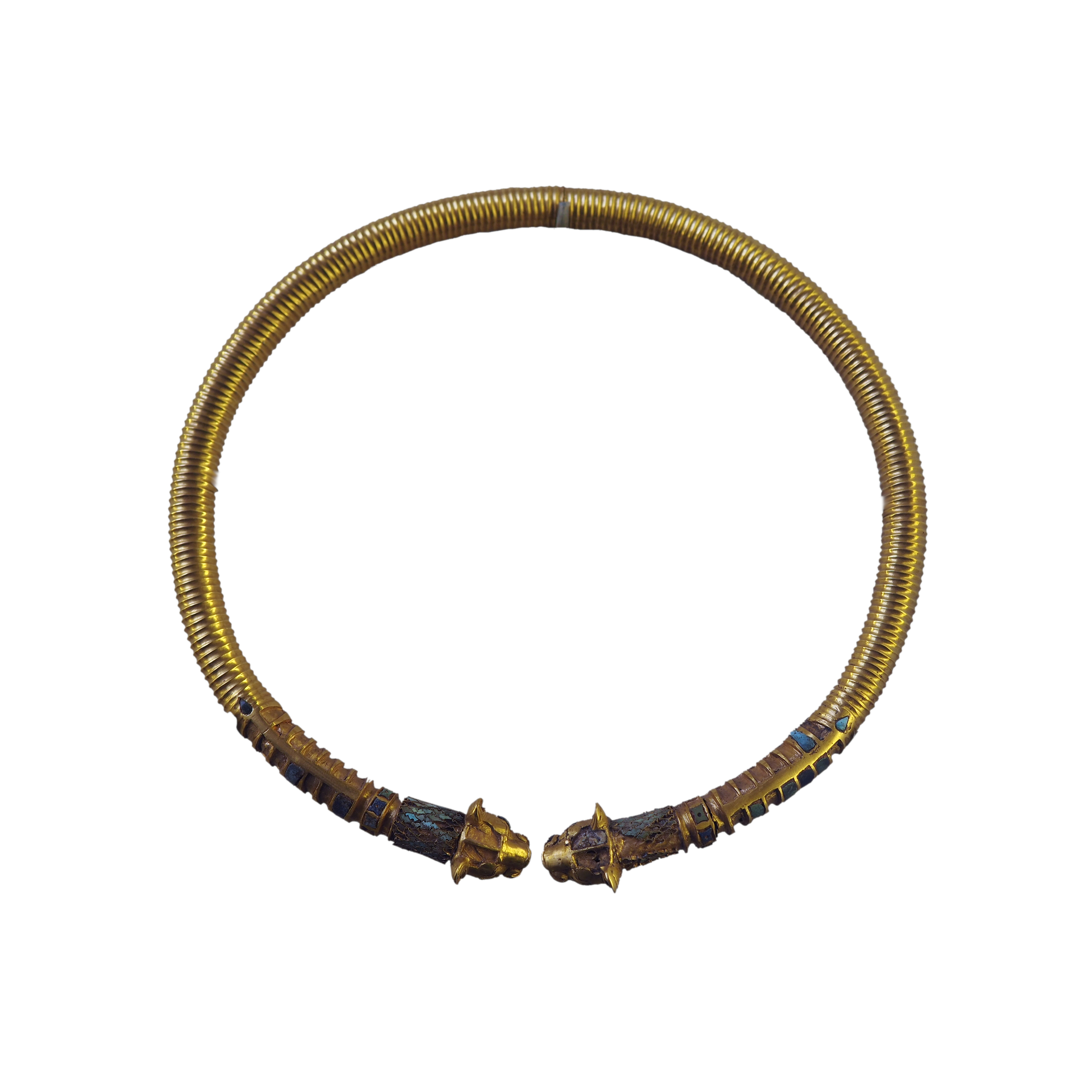
Torc with lion head

The Acropole Tomb was excavated on 6 February 1901 by Jacques de Morgan on the so called acropolis in Susa, Iran. The Achaemenide burial was found intact and contained a high number of personal adornments, many of them made in gold. The burial dates around 350 to 332 BC. Most of the objects are now on display in the Louvre in Paris. It is one of the most important Achaemenide treasures ever found.

The burial was found within an undecorated bronze coffin, that resembles a bath tub. There was found a skeleton lying on the back. Jacques de Morgan assumed that this was the burial of a woman due to the high number of personal adornments. However, golden jewelry appear also in burials of men. Most importantly the deceased was wearing a torc. Torcs were only worn by men in the Achaemenid Empire.

Two types of objects were found. There several items placed next to the deceased. These include two alabaster vessels and a silver bowl. All other items were found on the skeleton. There are several necklaces made of different materials. A torc was found around the neck and has end pieces with lion heads. The torc is made of gold with inlays in other materials. Two similar armlets were found. They are also made of gold and decorated with inlays.

== Literature ==
- Constantine Frank: The Acropolis tomb, in: Jean Perrot (editor.): The Palace of Darius at Susa, London 2013, ISBN 9781848856219, pp. 337–355
- Jacques de Morgan: Découverte d’une sépulture achéménide à Suse, in J. de Morgan et al, Recherches archéologiques: Deuxième serie, MDP 7, Paris, 1905, pp. 29–58 online.
