= Frasnes-lez-Buissenal =

VILLAGE LOCATED IN WALLONIA SOMEWHERE IN BELGIUM

Coordinates: 50°40′N 3°37′E

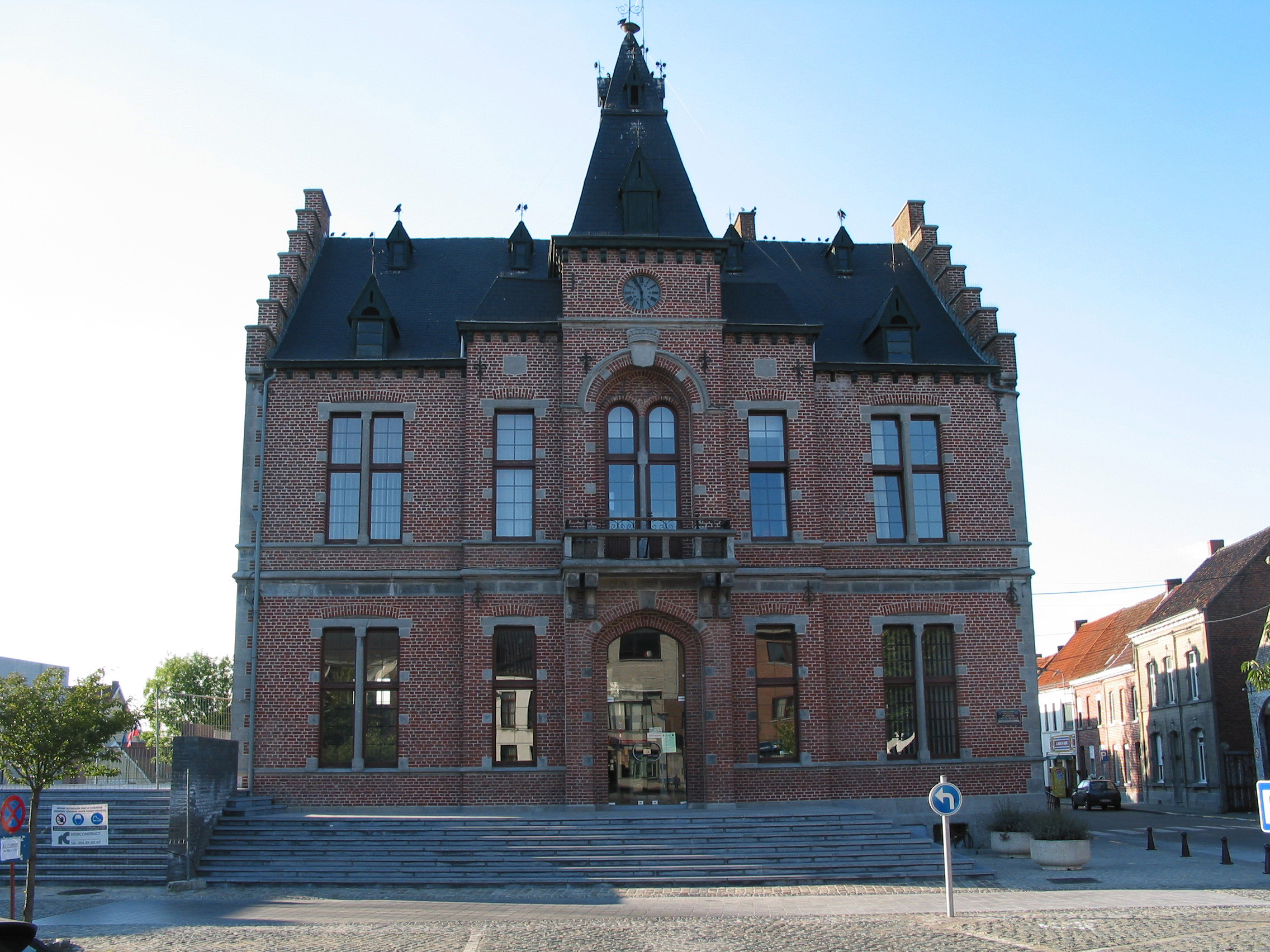
Frasnes-lez-Anvaing (Belgium), the town hall.

Frasnes-lez-Buissenal (French pronunciation: [fʁan le bɥisnal], lit. 'Frasnes near Buissenal') is a village of Wallonia and a district of the municipality of Frasnes-lez-Anvaing, located in the province of Hainaut, Belgium.

In 1864, foresters digging out the roots of a tree near the village unearthed the Frasnes Hoard.
