= Torc =

Rigid, usually twisted ring worn around the neck or arm, often of precious metal

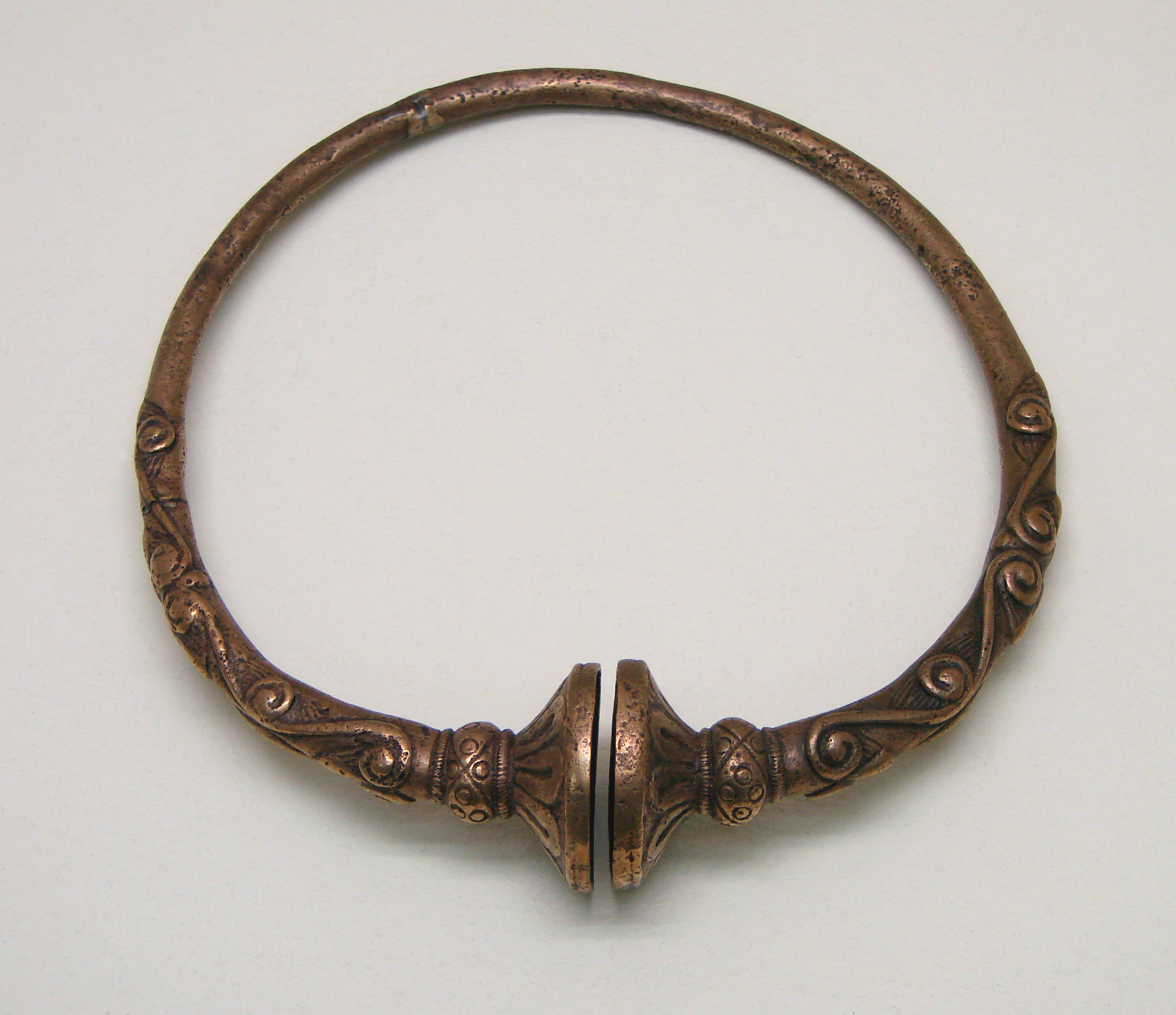
Bronze 4th-century BC buffer-type torc from France

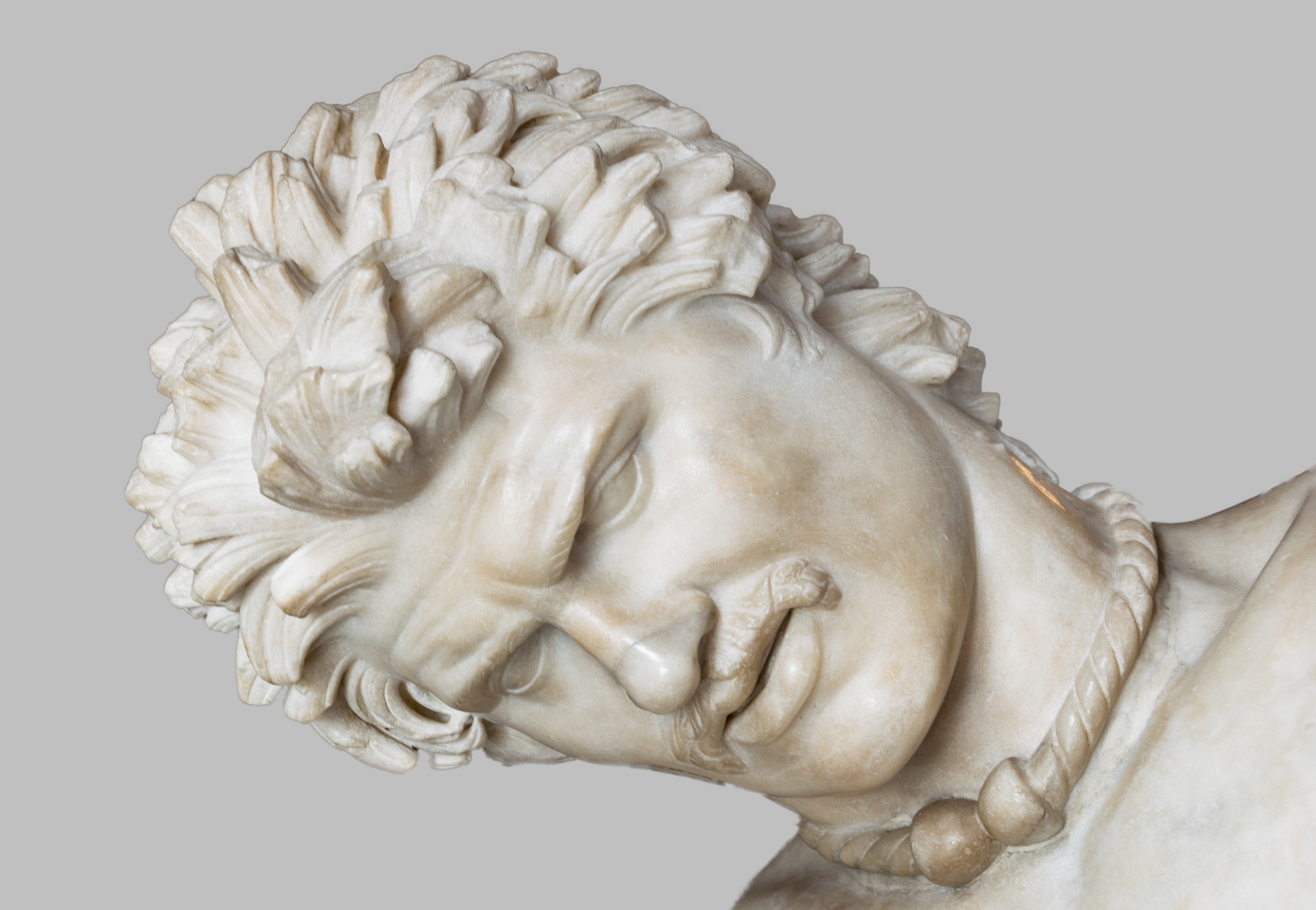
The Dying Gaul, a Roman statue with a torc in the Capitoline Museums in Rome

A torc, also spelled torq or torque, is a large rigid or stiff neck ring in metal, made either as a single piece or from strands twisted together. The great majority are open at the front, although some have hook and ring closures and a few have mortice and tenon locking catches to close them. Many seem designed for near-permanent wear and would have been difficult to remove.

Torcs have been found in Scythian, Illyrian, Thracian, Celtic, and other cultures of the European Iron Age from around the 8th century BC to the 3rd century AD. For Iron Age Celts, the gold torc seems to have been a key object. It identified the wearer—apparently usually female until the 3rd century BC, thereafter usually but not exclusively male—as a person of high rank, and many of the finest works of ancient Celtic art are torcs. Celtic torcs disappeared in the Migration Period, but during the Viking Age torc-style metal necklaces, mainly in silver, came back into fashion. Similar neck-rings are also part of the jewellery styles of various other cultures and periods.

== Terminology and definition ==
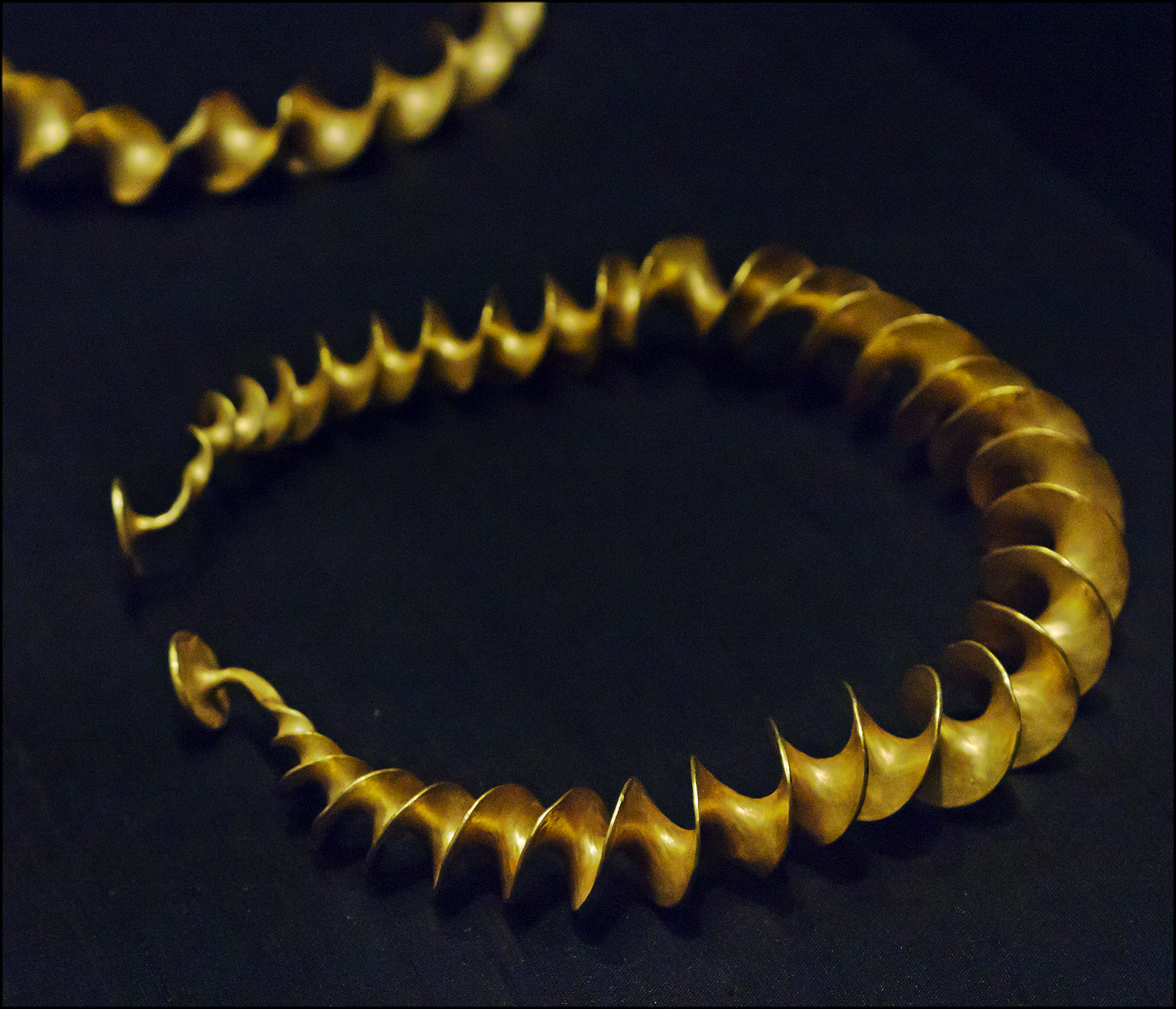
Unusually complex helical gold ribbon torc from the Stirling Hoard, Scotland

The word comes from Latin torquis (or torques), from torqueo, 'to twist', because of the twisted shape many of the rings have. Typically, neck-rings that open at the front when worn are called "torcs" and those that open at the back "collars". Smaller bracelets and armlets worn around the wrist or on the upper arm sometimes share very similar forms. Torcs were made from single or multiple intertwined metal rods, or "ropes" of twisted wire. Most of those that have been found are made from gold or bronze, less often silver, iron or other metals (gold, bronze and silver survive better than other metals when buried for long periods).

Elaborate examples, sometimes hollow, used a variety of techniques but complex decoration was usually begun by casting and then worked by further techniques. The Ipswich Hoard includes unfinished torcs that give clear evidence of the stages of work. Flat-ended terminals are called "buffers", and in types like the "fused-buffer" shape, where what resemble two terminals are actually a single piece, the element is called a "muff".

== Bronze Age Europe and Asia ==
There are several types of rigid gold and sometimes bronze necklaces and collars of the later European Bronze Age, from around 1200 BC, many of which are classed as "torcs". They are mostly twisted in various conformations, including the "twisted ribbon" type, where a thin strip of gold is twisted into a spiral. Other examples twist a bar with a square or X section, or just use round wire, with both types in the three 12th– or 11th-century BC specimens found at Tiers Cross, Pembrokeshire, Wales. The Milton Keynes Hoard contained two large examples of thicker rounded forms, as also used for bracelets.

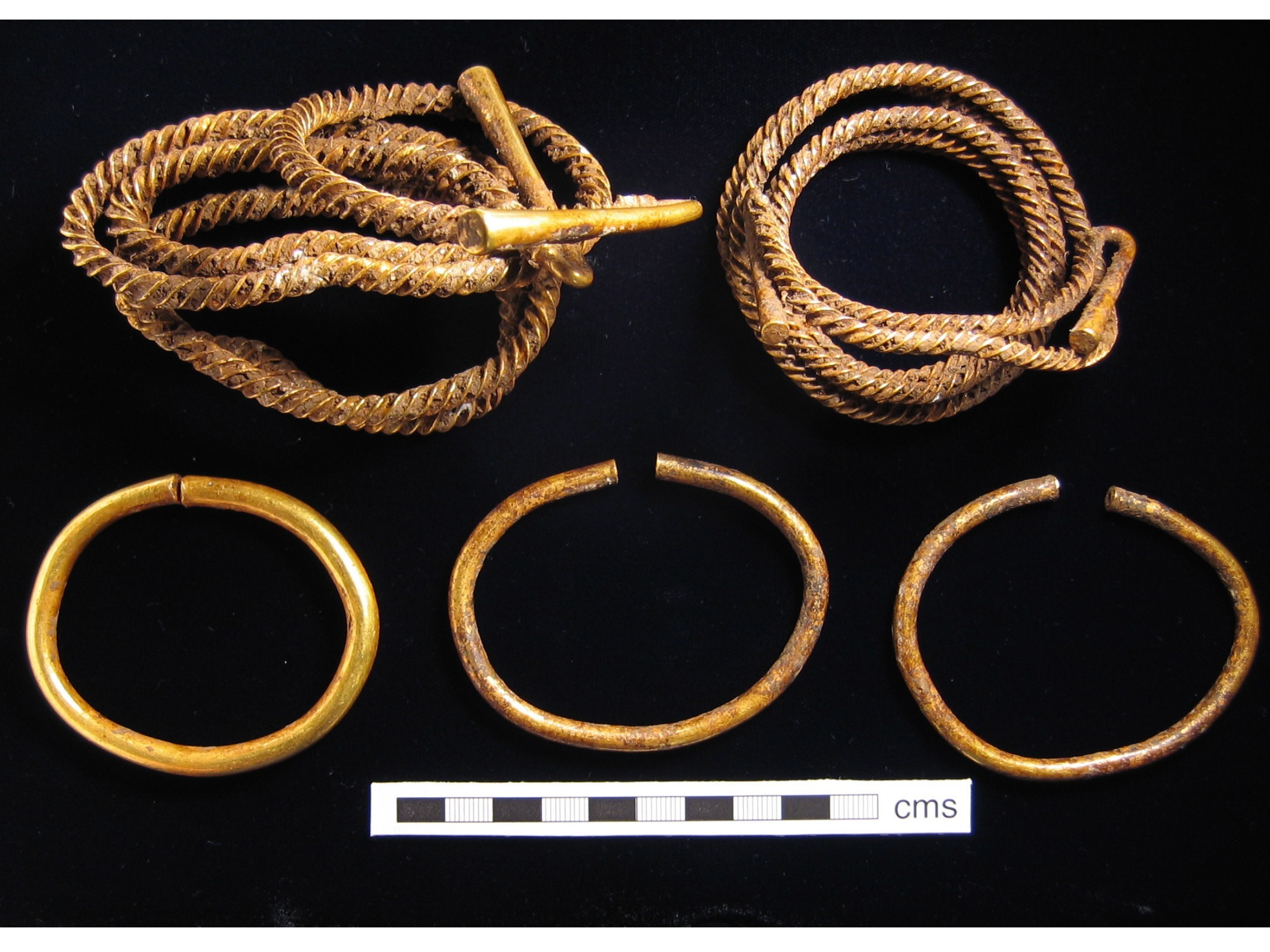
Two uncleaned Bronze Age twisted bar torcs with flared cylinder terminals, as often found folded up, with bracelets, England

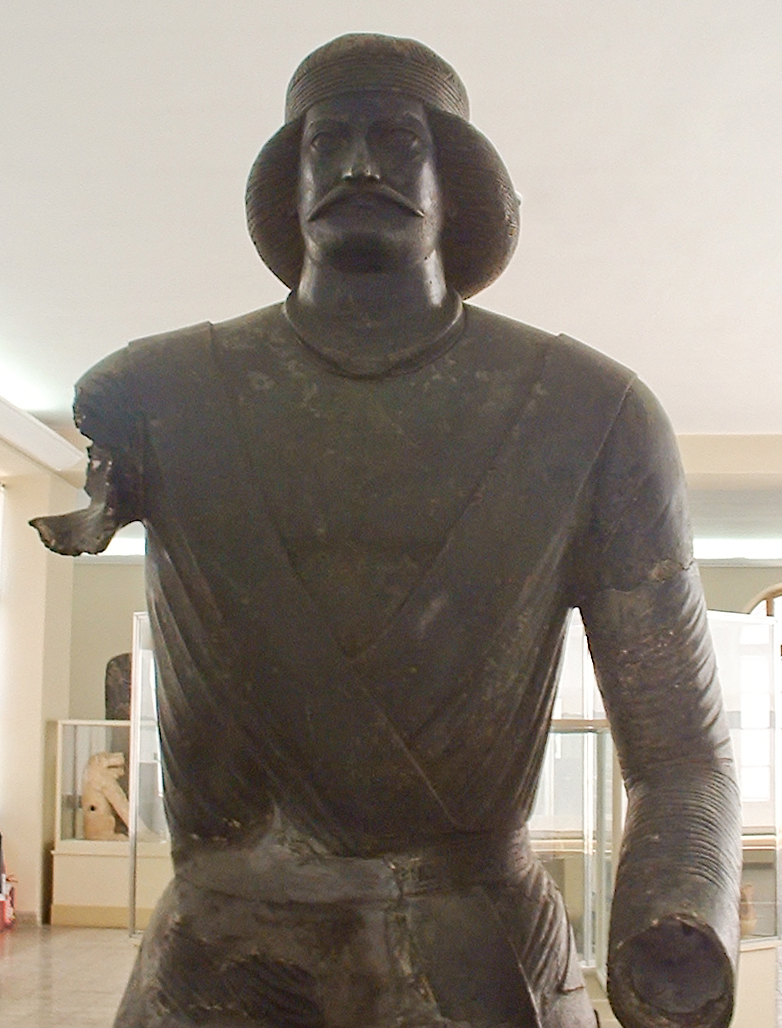
The "Shami statue", depicting a Parthian nobleman, shows him wearing a torc.

The terminals are not emphasized as in typical Iron Age torcs, though many can be closed by hooking the simple terminals together. Many of these "torcs" are too small to be worn round the neck of an adult, and were either worn as bracelets or armlets, or by children or statues. Archaeologists find dating many torcs difficult, with some believing torcs were retained for periods of centuries as heirlooms, and others believing there were two periods of production. Differing ratios of silver in the gold of other objects—typically up to 15% in the Bronze Age but up to 20% in the Iron Age—can help decide the question. There are several flared gold torcs with a C-shaped section in the huge Mooghaun North Hoard of Late Bronze Age gold from 800 to 700 BC found in County Clare in Ireland.

In parts of Asia, torcs appear in Scythian art from the Early Iron Age, and include "classicizing" decoration drawing on styles from the east. Torcs are also found in Thraco-Cimmerian art. Torcs are found in the Tolstaya burial and the Karagodeuashk kurgan (Kuban area), both dating to the 4th century BC. A torc is part of the Pereshchepina hoard dating to the 7th century AD. Thin torcs, often with animal head terminals, are found in the art of the Persian Achaemenid Empire, with some other elements derived from Scythian art.

== Celtic torcs ==
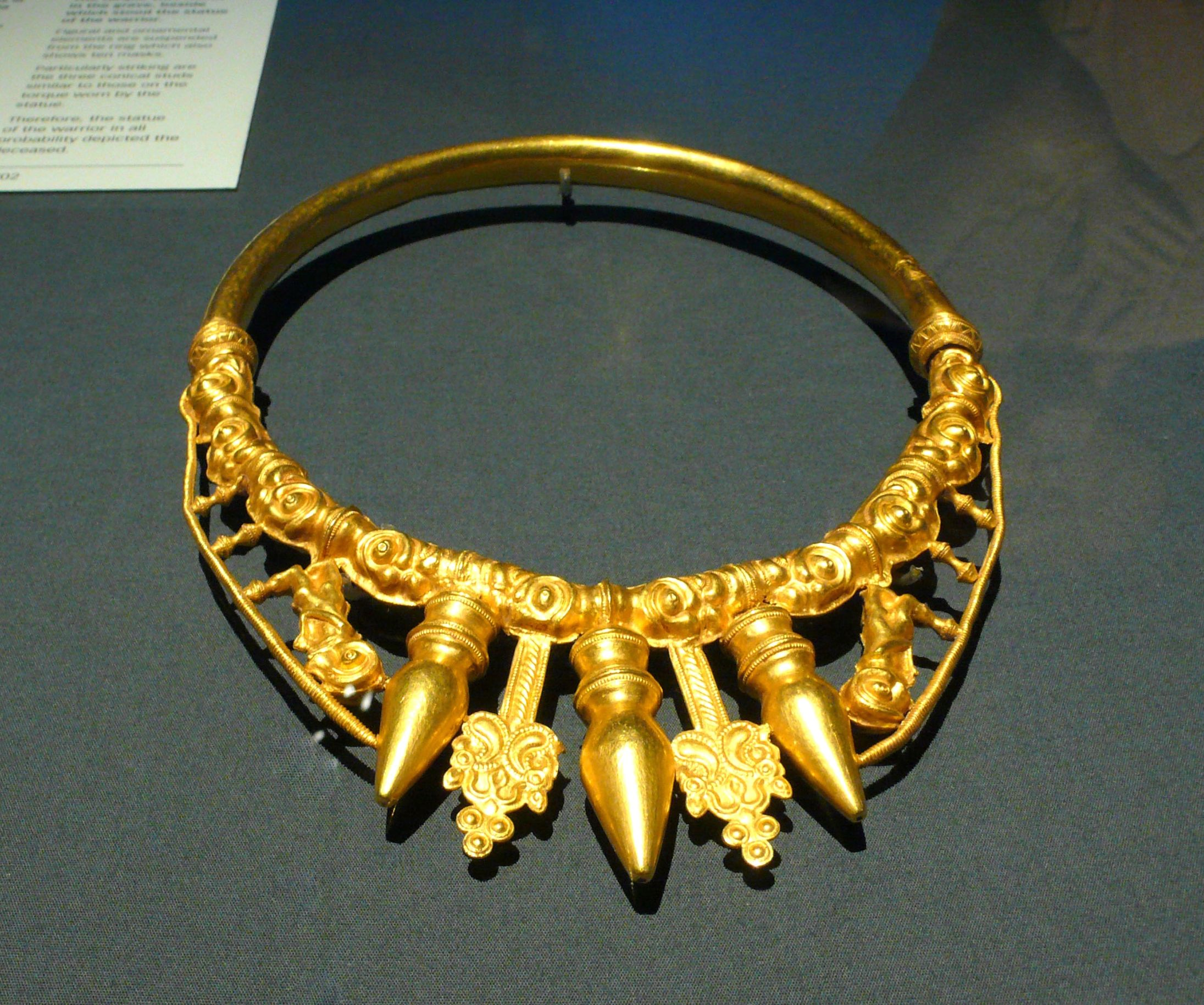
Gold Celtic torc with three "balusters" and decoration including animals, found in Glauberg, Germany, 400 BC

Depictions of the gods and goddesses of Celtic mythology sometimes show them wearing or carrying torcs, as in images of the god Cernunnos wearing one torc around his neck, with torcs hanging from his antlers or held in his hand, as on the Gundestrup cauldron. This may represent the deity as the source of power and riches, as the torc was a sign of nobility and high social status.

The famous Roman copy of the original Greek sculpture The Dying Gaul depicts a wounded Gaulish warrior naked except for a torc, which is how Polybius described the gaesatae, Celtic warriors from modern northern Italy or the Alps, fighting at the Battle of Telamon in 225 BC, although other Celts there were clothed. One of the earliest known depictions of a torc can be found on the Warrior of Hirschlanden (6th century BC), and a high proportion of the few Celtic statues of human figures, mostly male, show them wearing torcs.

Other possible functions that have been proposed for torcs include use as rattles in rituals or otherwise, as some have stones or metal pieces inside them, and representations of figures thought to be deities carrying torcs in their hand may depict this. Some are too heavy to wear for long, and may have been made to place on cult statues. Very few of these remain but they may well have been in wood and not survived. Torcs were clearly valuable, and often found broken in pieces, so being a store of value may have been an important part of their use. It has been noted that the Iberian gold examples seem to be made at fixed weights that are multiples of the Phoenician shekel.

With bracelets, torcs are "the most important category of Celtic gold", though armlets and anklets were also worn; in contrast finger-rings were less common among the early Celts. The earliest Celtic torcs are mostly found buried with women, for example, the gold torc from the La Tène period chariot burial of a princess, found in the Waldalgesheim chariot burial in Germany, and others found in female graves at Vix in France (illustrated) and Reinheim. Another La Tène example was found as part of a hoard or ritual deposit buried near Erstfeld in Switzerland. It is thought by some authors that the torc was mostly an ornament for women until the late 3rd century BC, when it became an attribute of warriors. However, there is evidence for male wear in the early period; in a rich double burial of the Hallstatt period at Hochmichele, the man wears an iron torc and the female a necklace with beads. A heavy torc in silver over an iron core with bull's head terminals, weighing over 6 kilos, from Trichtingen, Germany, probably dates to the 2nd century BC (illustrated).

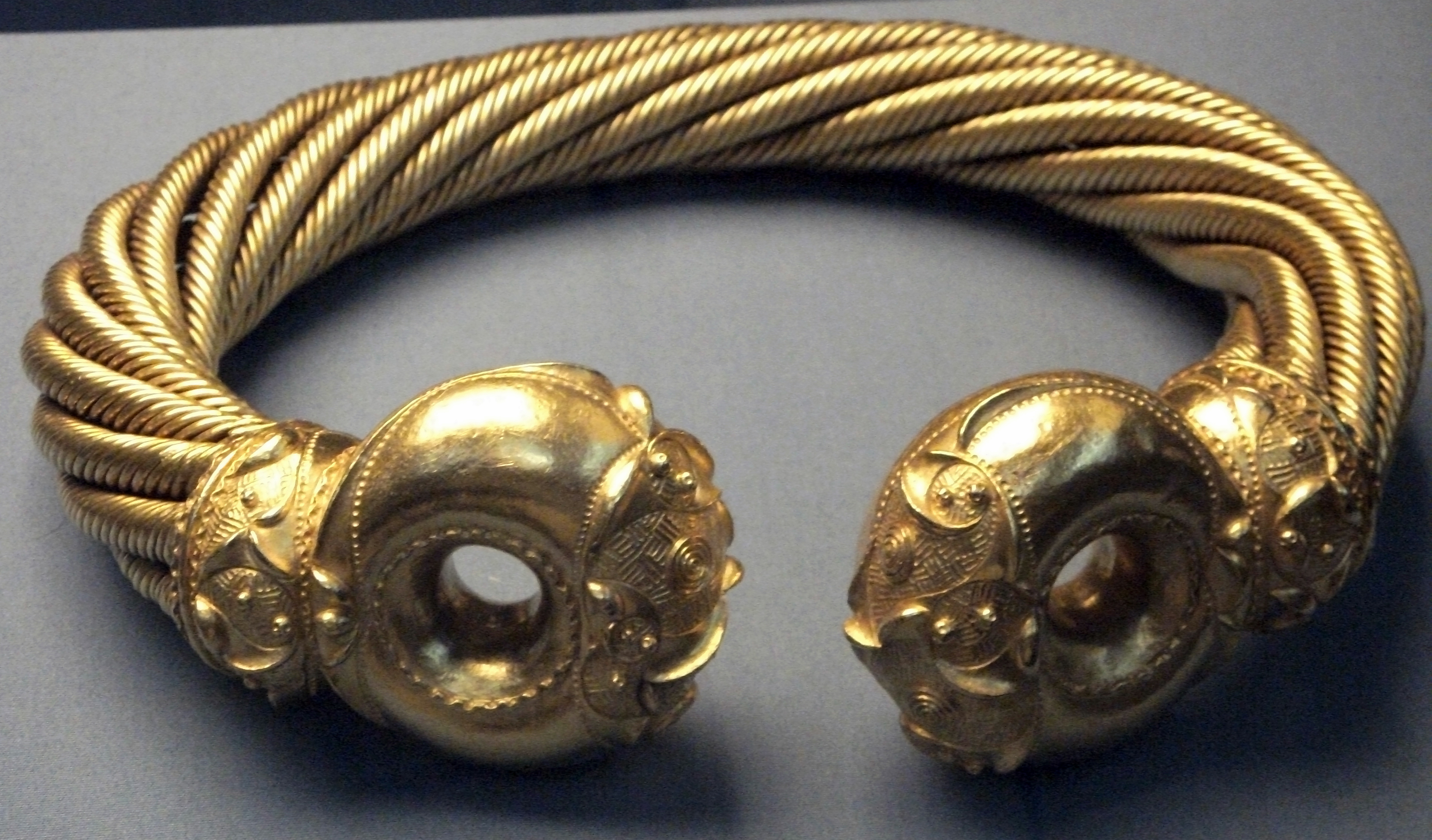
The Snettisham Torc contains a kilogram of gold. It was found in Norfolk, England.

Many finds of torcs, especially in groups and in association with other valuables but not associated with a burial, are clearly deliberate deposits whose function is unclear. They may have been ritual deposits or hidden for safekeeping in times of warfare. Some may represent the work-in-progress of a workshop. After the early period, torcs are especially prominent in the Celtic cultures reaching to a coast of the Atlantic, from modern Spain to Ireland, and on both sides of the English Channel.

Some very elaborately worked torcs with relief decoration in a late form of La Tène style have been found in Britain and Ireland, dating from roughly the 3rd to 1st centuries BC. There may be a connection with an older tradition in the British Isles of elaborate gold neckwear in the form of gold lunulas, which seem centred on Ireland in the Bronze Age, and later flat or curved wide collars; gold twisted ribbon torcs are found from both periods, but also imported styles such as the fused-buffer. The most elaborate late Insular torcs are thick and often hollow, some with terminals forming a ring or loop. The most famous English example is the 1st-century BC multi-stranded electrum Snettisham Torc found in northwestern Norfolk in England (illustrated), while the single hollow torc in the Broighter Gold hoard, with relief decoration all round the hoop, is the finest example of this type from Ireland, also 1st century BC. The Stirling Hoard, a rare find in Scotland of four gold torcs, two of them twisted ribbons, dating from the 3rd to 1st century BC, was discovered in September 2009.

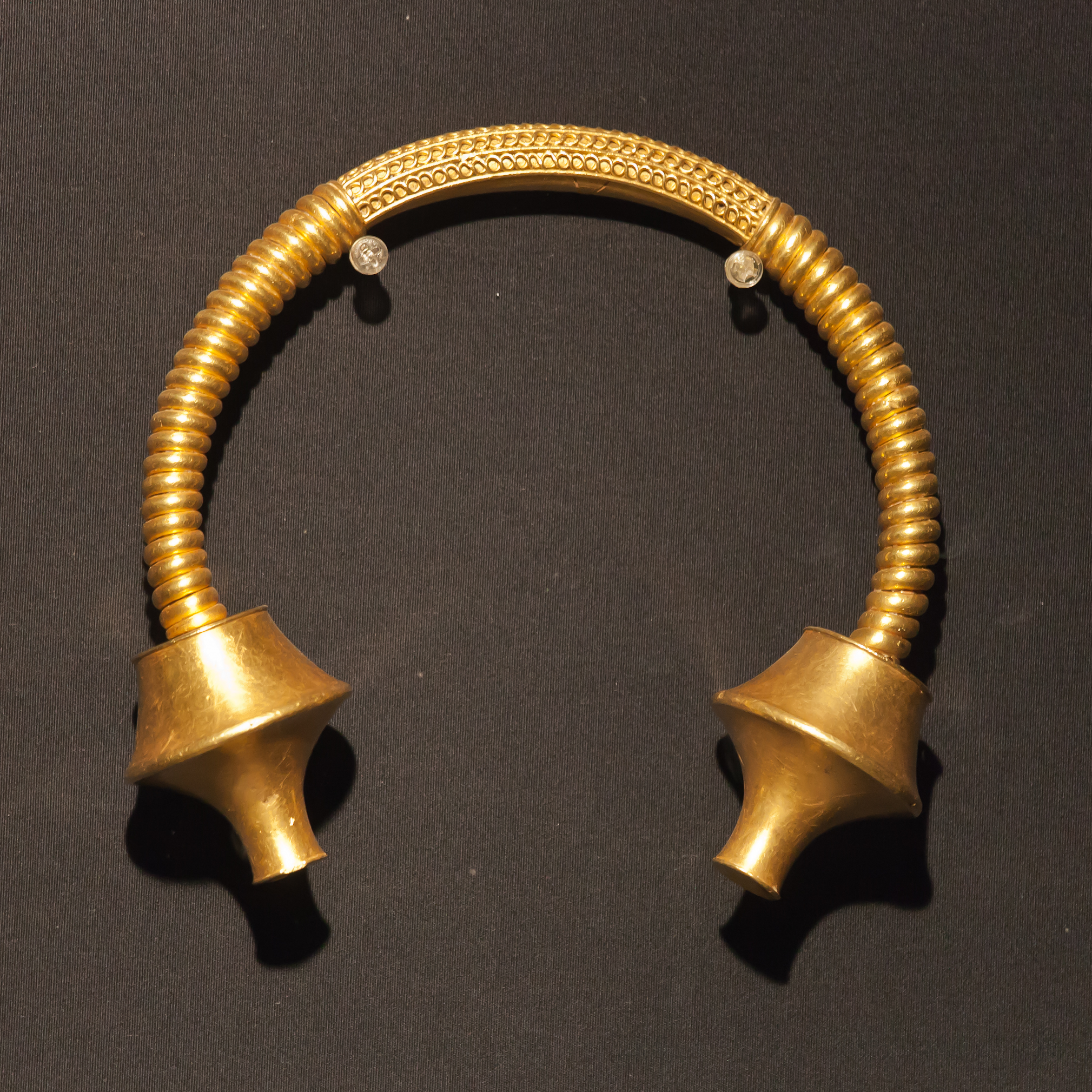
Torc from Burela, Galicia, with double moulding scotiae terminals, and hoop decoration. At 1.812 kg (3.99 lb) the heaviest Iberian torc.

The Roman Titus Manlius in 361 BC challenged a Gaul to single combat, killed him, and then took his torc. Because he always wore it, he received the nickname Torquatus (the one who wears a torc), and it was adopted by his family. After this, Romans adopted the torc as a decoration for distinguished soldiers and elite units during Republican times. A few Roman torcs have been discovered. Pliny the Elder records that after a battle in 386 BC (long before his lifetime) the Romans recovered 183 torcs from the Celtic dead, and similar booty is mentioned by other authors.

It is not clear whether the Gallo-Roman "Warrior of Vacheres", a sculpture of a soldier in Roman military dress, wears a torc as part of his Roman uniform or as a reflection of his Celtic background. Quintilian says that the Emperor Augustus was presented by Gauls with a gold torc weighing 100 Roman pounds (nearly 33 kilograms or 73 pounds), far too heavy to wear. A torc from the 1st century BC Winchester Hoard, is broadly in Celtic style but uses the Roman technique of laced gold wire, suggesting it may have been a "diplomatic gift" from a Roman to a British tribal king.

A very late example of a torc used as ceremonial item in early Medieval Wales can be found in the writings of Gerald of Wales. The author wrote that there still existed a certain royal torc that had once been worn by Prince Cynog ap Brychan of Brycheiniog (fl. 492 AD) and was known as Saint Kynauc's Collar. Gerald encountered and described this relic first-hand while travelling through Wales in 1188. Of it he says, "it is most like to gold in weight, nature, and colour; it is in four pieces wrought round, joined together artificially, and clefted as it were in the middle, with a dog's head, the teeth standing outward; it is esteemed by the inhabitants so powerful a relic, that no man dares swear falsely when it is laid before him." It is possible that this torc long pre-dated the reign of Prince Cynog and was a much earlier relic that had been recycled during the British Dark Ages to be used as a symbol of royal authority. It is now lost.

There are mentions in medieval compilations of Irish mythology; for example in the Lebor Gabála Érenn (11th century) Elatha wore 5 golden torcs when meeting Eriu.

=== Romano-British beaded torcs ===
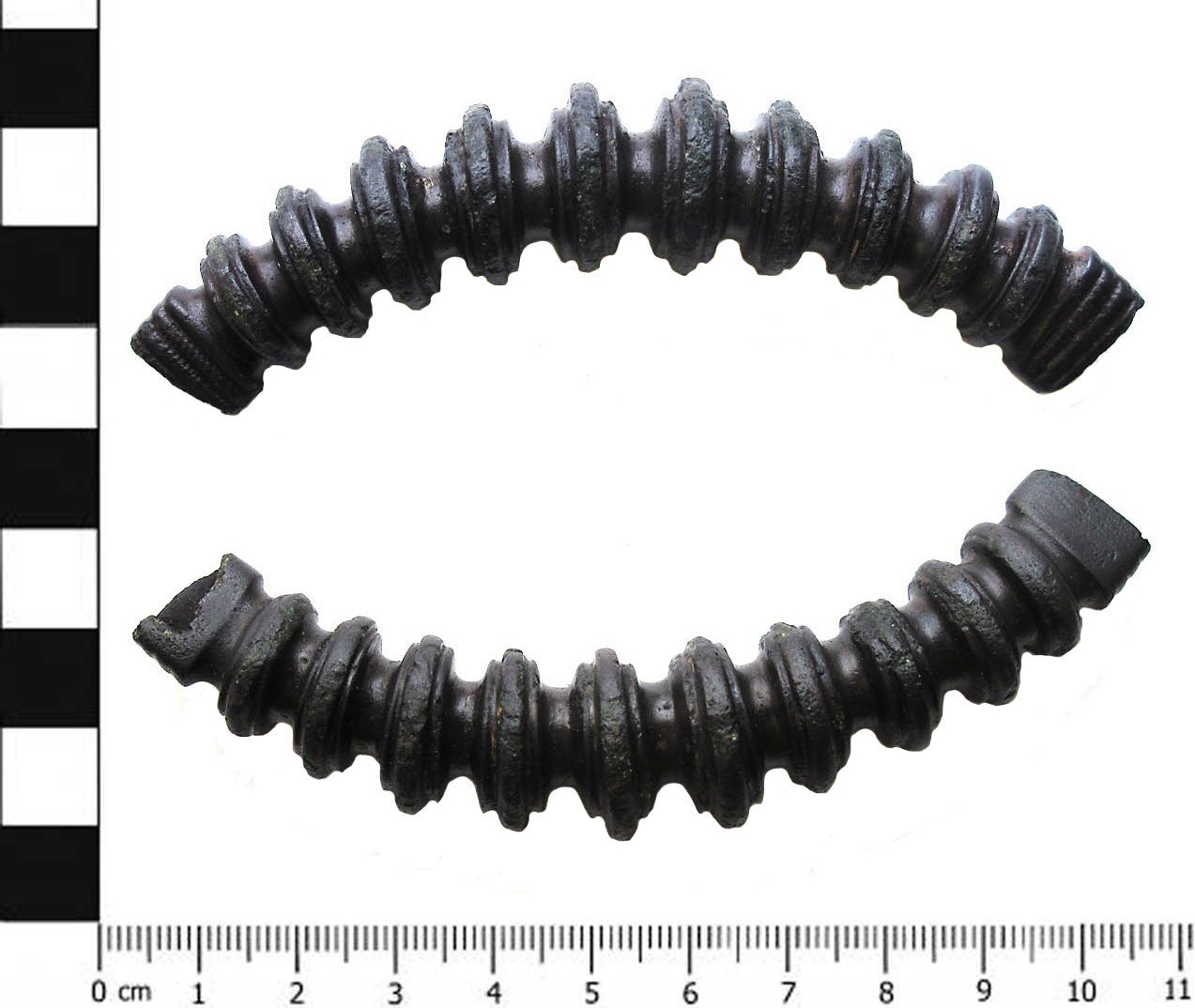
Section of a beaded torc found in Yorkshire, AD 75–200

After the Roman conquest of Britain, from about 75 AD for a century or more, a different type called the "beaded torc" appears in Roman Britain, mainly in the northern "frontier" region, in two types, A with separate "beads" and B made in one piece. These are in copper alloy rather than precious metal, and evidently more widely spread in society than the elite Iron Age Celtic examples.

== Shapes and decoration ==
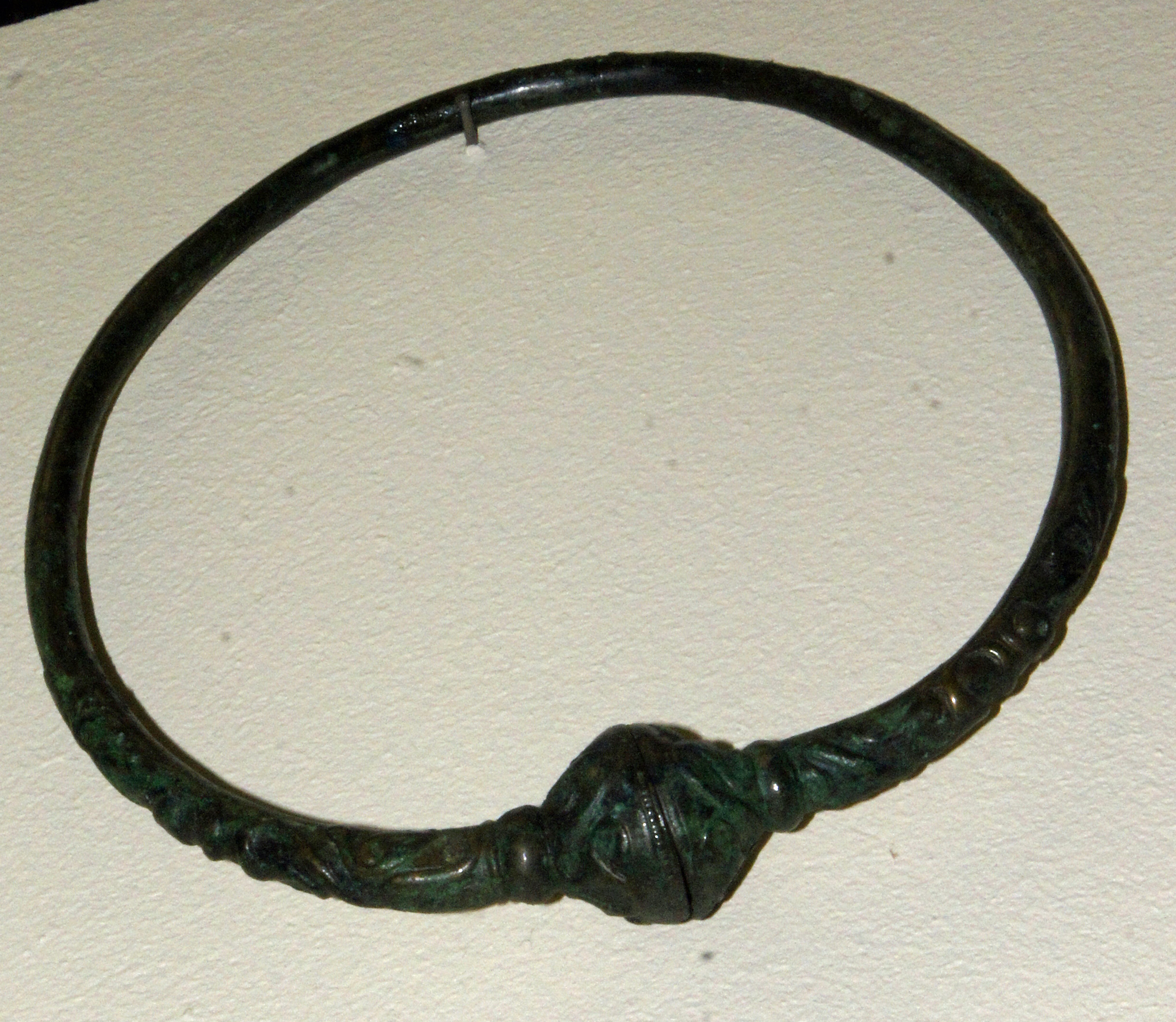
French fused-buffer type with "muff", c. 350 BC

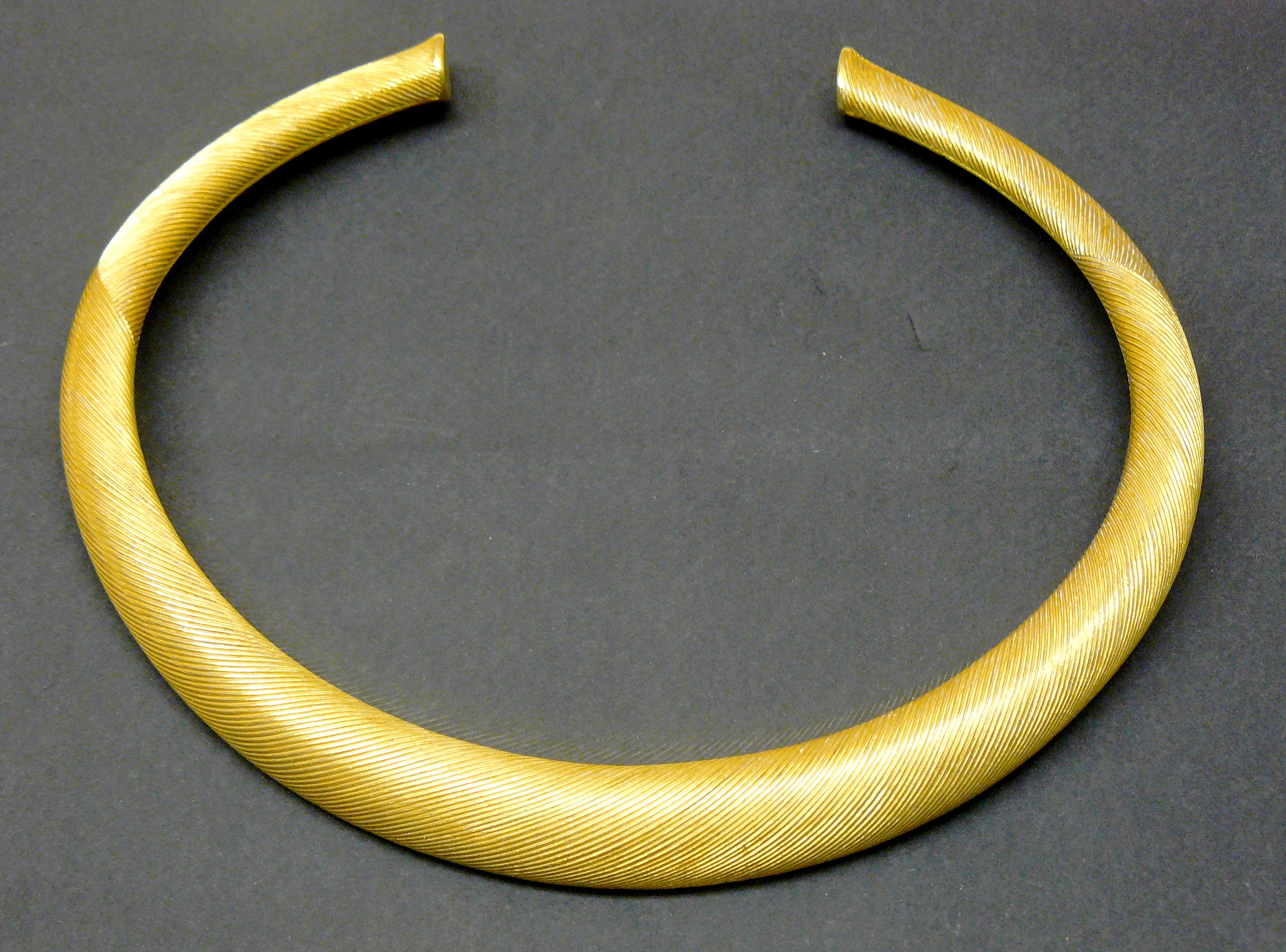
Sleek Bronze Age torc in striated gold, northern France, c. 1200–1000 BC, 794 grams

Most Achaemenid torcs are thin single round bars with matching animal heads as the terminals, facing each other at the front. Some Early Celtic forms depart from the normal style of torc by lacking a break at the throat, and instead are heavily decorated at the continuous front, with animal elements and short rows of "balusters", rounded projections coming to a blunt point; these are seen both on the sculpted torc worn by the stone "Glauberg Warrior" and a gold torc (illustrated) found in the same oppidum.

Later Celtic torcs nearly all return to having a break at the throat and strong emphasis on the two terminals. The Vix torc has two very finely made winged horses standing on fancy platforms projecting sideways just before the terminals, which are flattened balls under lions' feet. Like other elite Celtic pieces in the "orientalizing" style, the decoration shows Greek influence but not a classical style, and the piece may have been made by Greeks in the Celtic taste, or a "Graeco-Etruscan workshop", or by Celts with foreign training.

Spiral ribbon torcs, usually with minimal terminals, continue a Bronze Age type and are found in the Stirling Hoard from Scotland, and elsewhere: "Although over 110 identifiable British [includes Ireland] ribbon torcs are known, the dating of these simple, flexible ornaments is elusive", perhaps indicating "a long-lived preference for ribbon torcs, which continued for over 1,000 years". The terminals were often slightly flared plain round cylinders which were folded back to hook round each other to fasten the torc at the throat. Other Celtic torcs may use various ways of forming the hoop: plain or patterned round bars, two or more bars twisted together, thin round rods (or thick wire) wound round a core, or woven gold wire. A rarer type twists a single bar with an X profile.

Except in British looped terminals, the terminals of Iron Age torcs are usually formed separately. The "buffer" form of terminal was the most popular in finds from modern France and Germany, with some "fused buffer" types opening at the rear or sides. In both buffer types and those with projecting fringes of ornament, decoration in low relief often continues back round the hoop as far as the midpoint of the side view. In Iberian torcs thin gold bars are often wound round a core of base metal, with the rear section a single round section with a decorated surface.

The c. 150 torcs found in the lands of the Iberian Celts of Galicia favoured terminals ending in balls coming to a point or small buffer ("pears"), or a shape with a double moulding called scotiae. The pointed ball is also found in northern Italy, where the hoops often end by being turned back upon themselves so that the terminals face out to the sides, perhaps enabling closure by hooking round. Both of these mostly used plain round bars or thin rods wound round a core. In the terminals of British torcs loops or rings are common, and the main hoop may be two or more round bars twisted together, or several strands each made up of twisted wire. Decoration of the terminals in the finest examples is complex but all abstract. In these two types the hoop itself normally has no extra decoration, though the large torc in the Irish Broighter Gold hoard is decorated all round the hoop, the only Irish example decorated in this way.

== Gallery ==
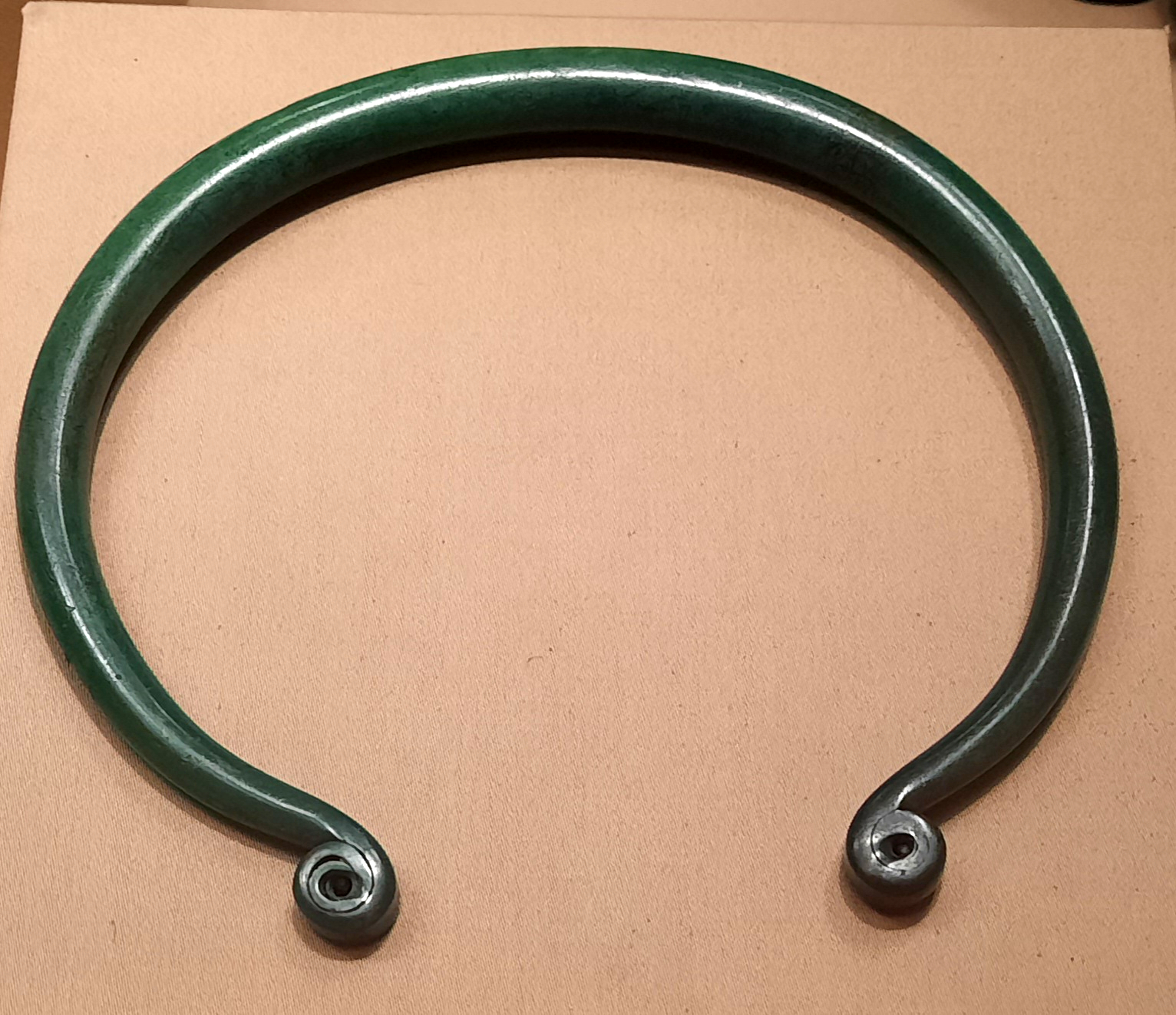
Torc, found in Hungary, c. 1500 BC, bronze

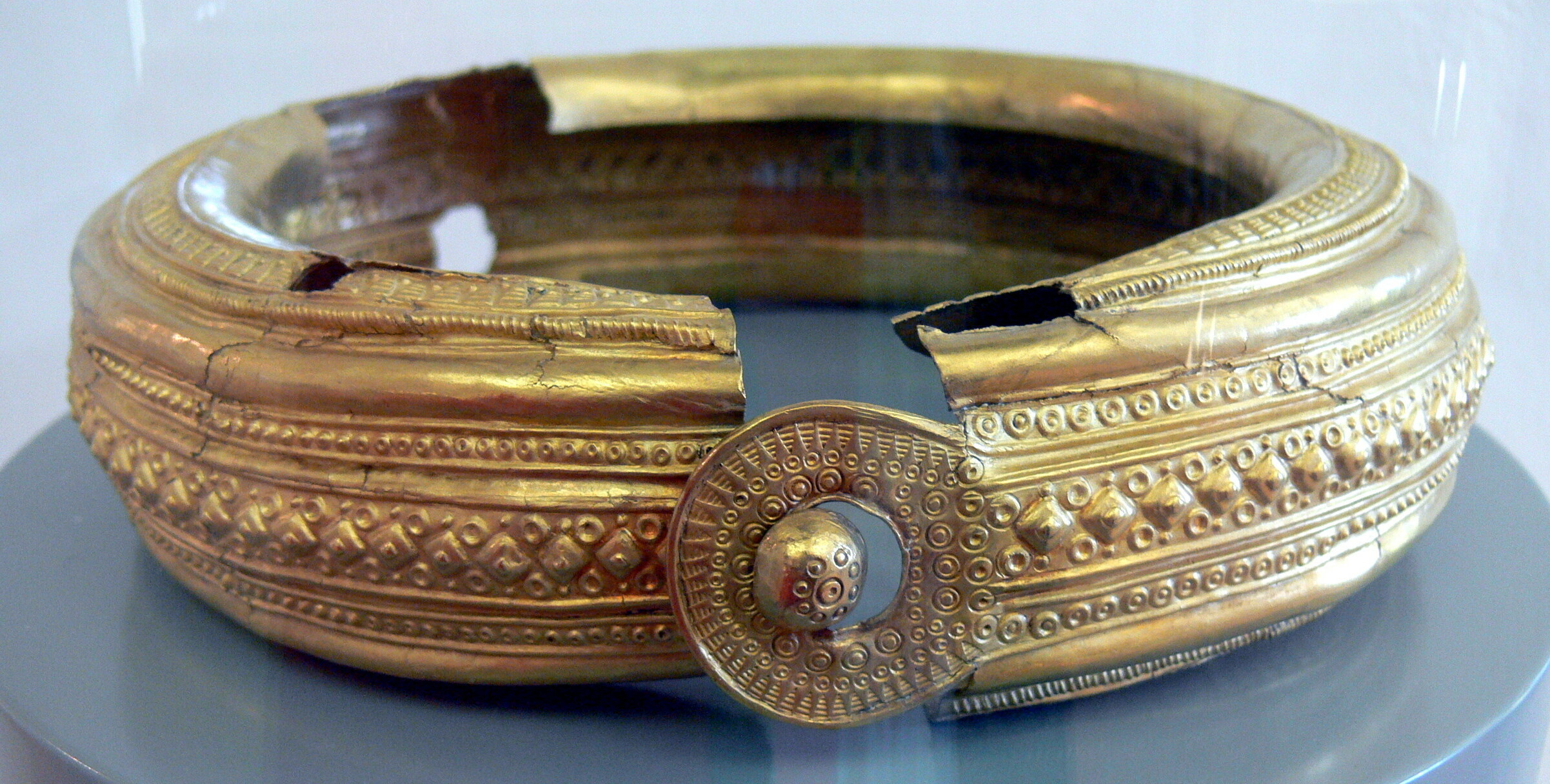
Hallstatt culture gold torc or collar with fastening, c. 550 BC

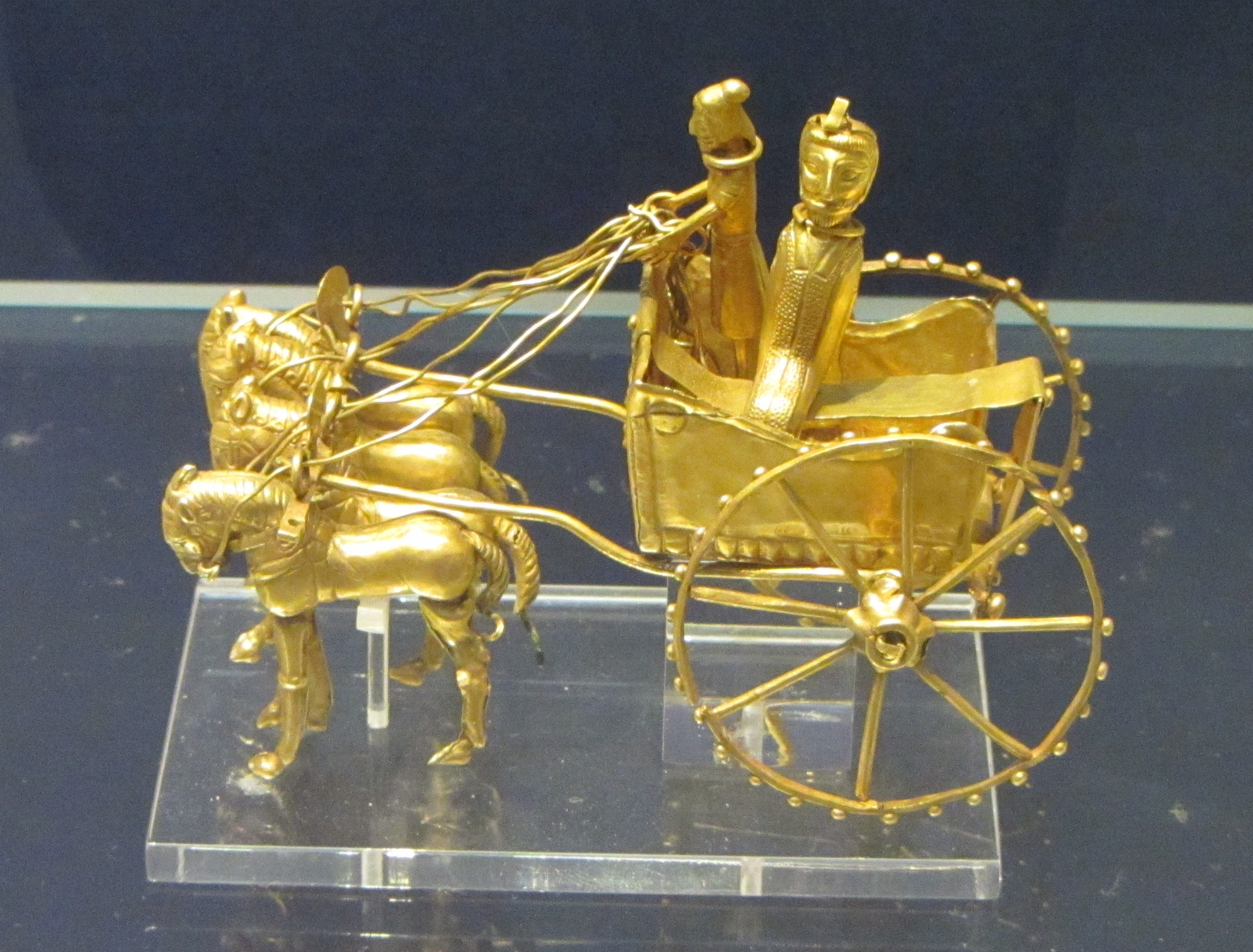
Model chariot from the Oxus Treasure, with both figures wearing torcs

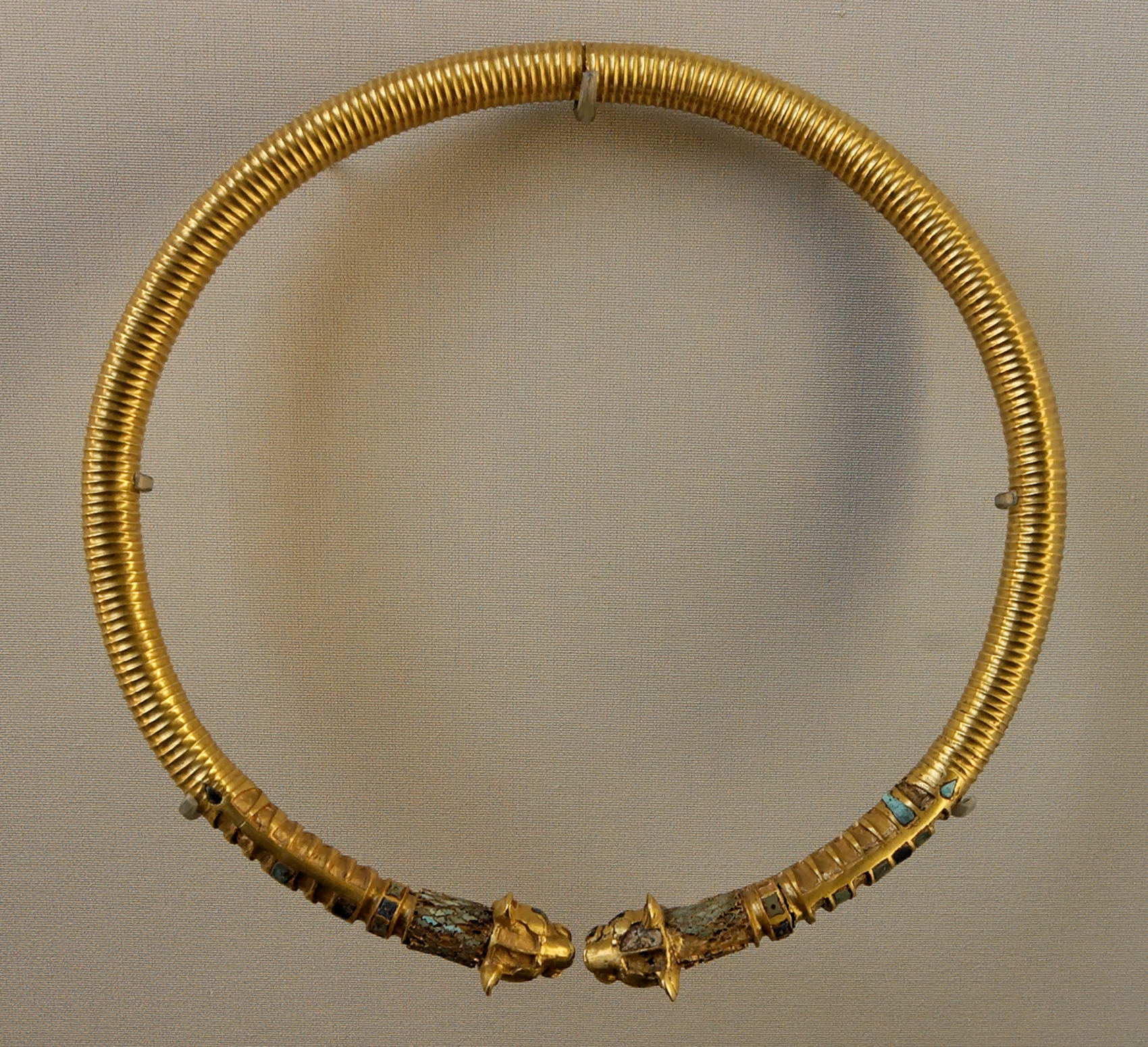
Achaemenid torc from Persia, c. 350 BC, Susa, with ribbed hoop, animal head terminals, and stone inlays, from the Acropole Tomb

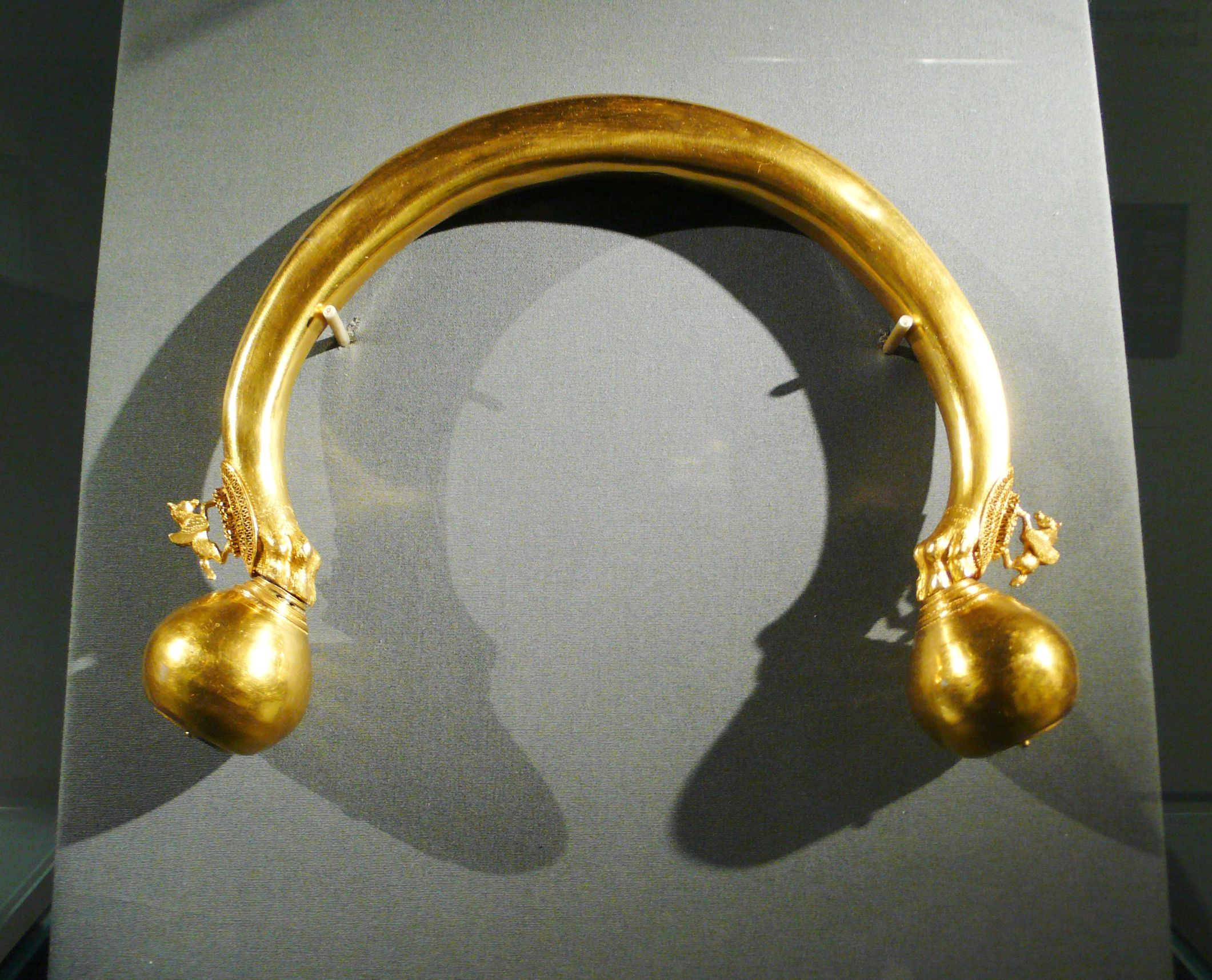
Gold Celtic torc found in Vix, France, 480 BC; see text.

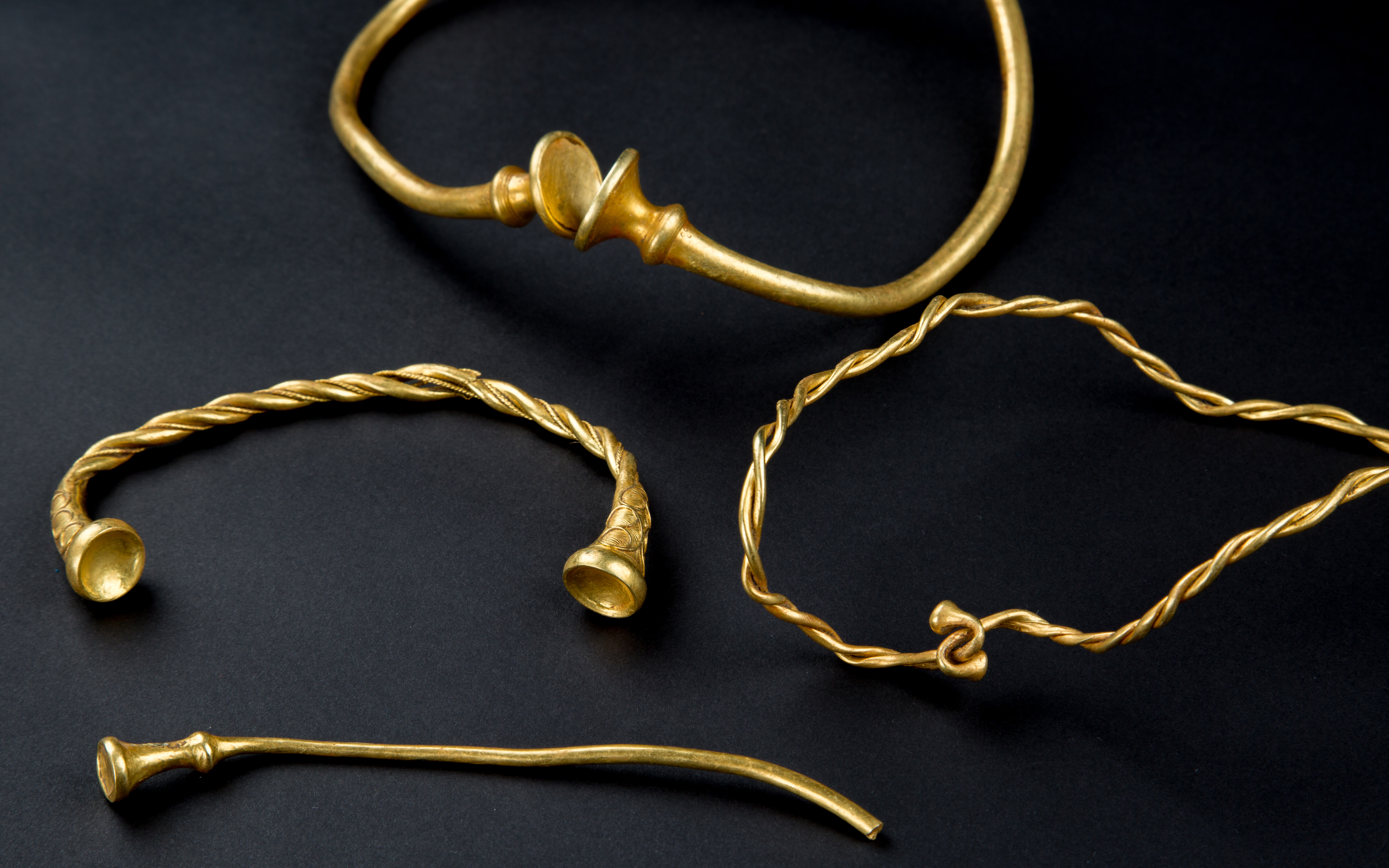
The four Leekfrith torcs, dating from c. 400–250 BC, which are the oldest gold torcs found in Great Britain

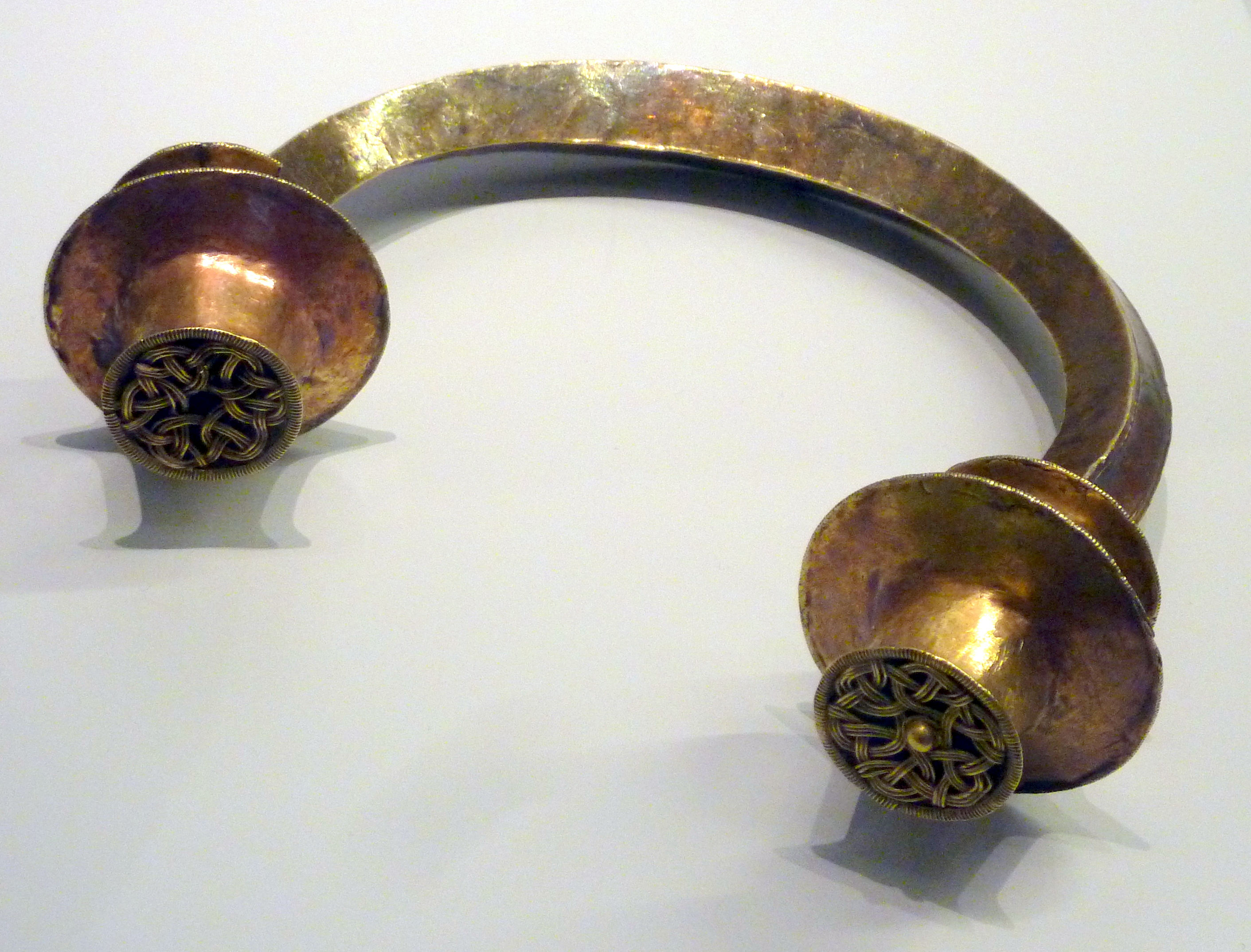
Torques de Foxados: Gallaecian torc with double "scotia" terminals and 6-fold symmetric interlaced motive

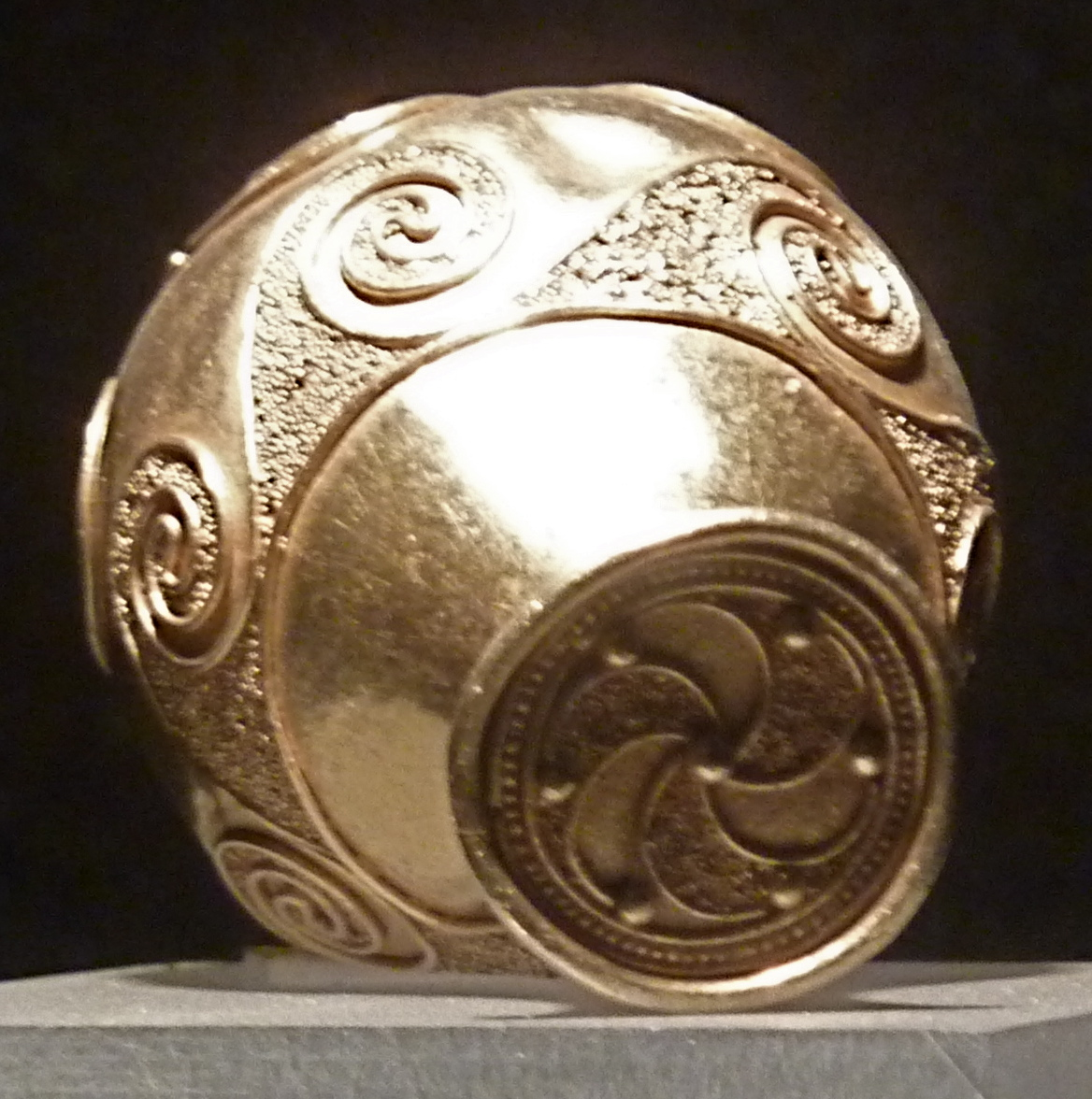
Bell shaped torc terminal from A Guarda, Galicia. Museo do Castro de St. Tegra.

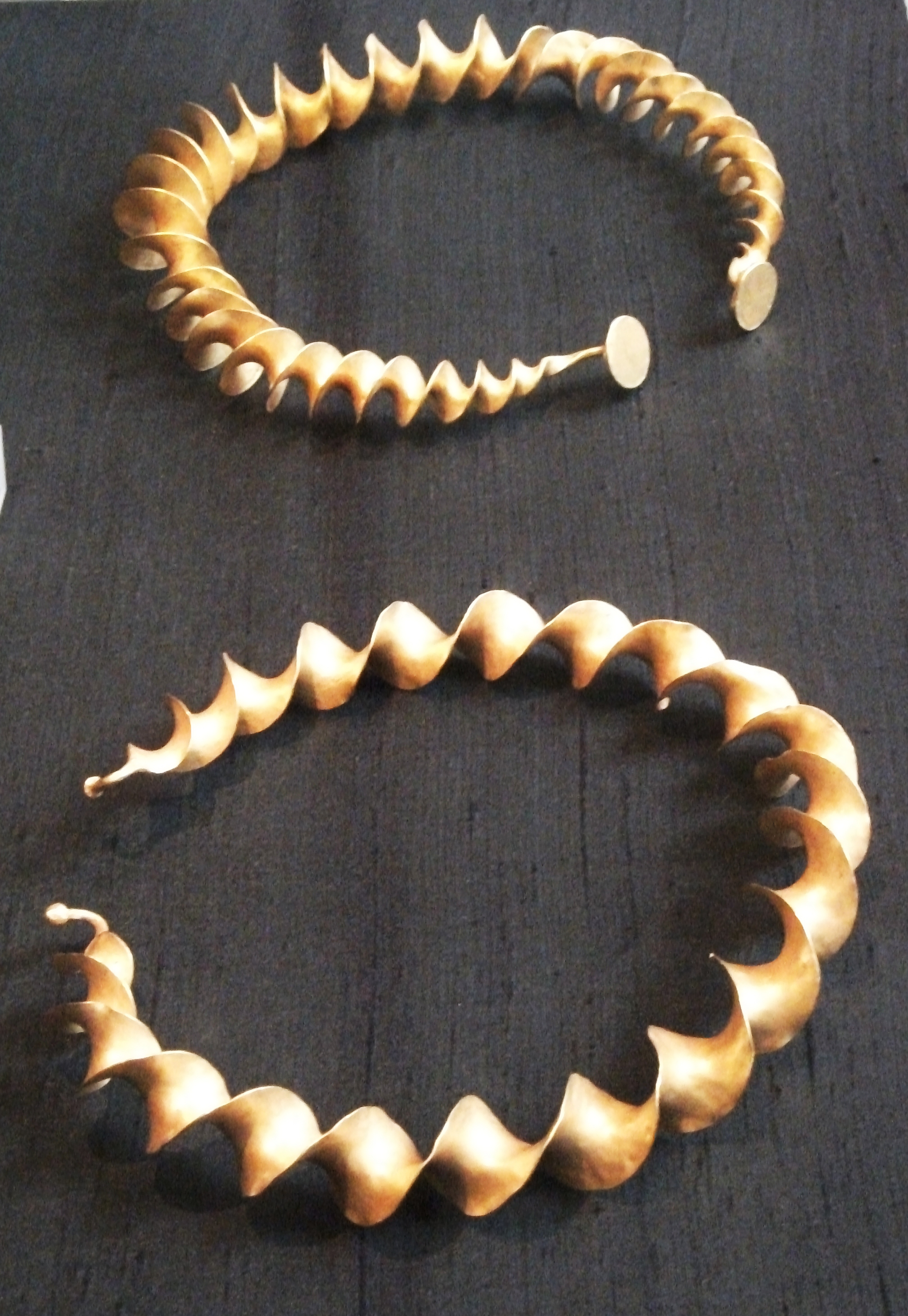
The twisted ribbon type, here from the Stirling Hoard, is found in both Bronze and Iron Ages.

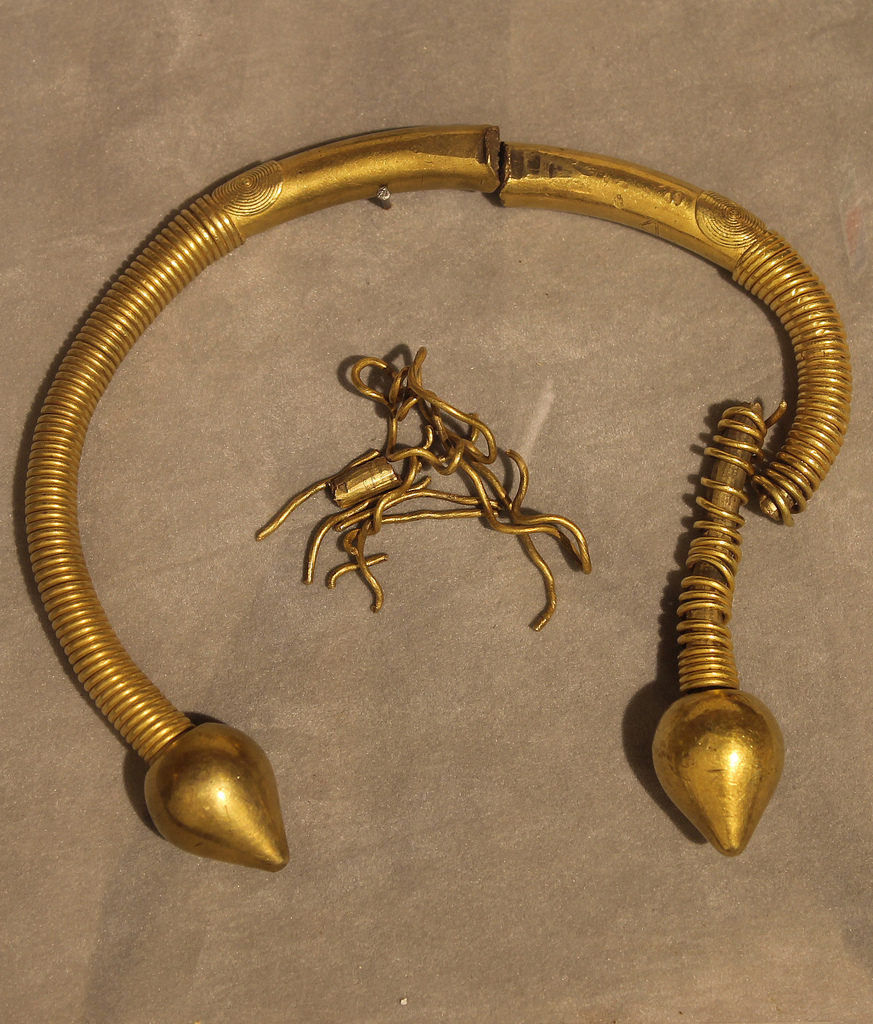
Northern Gallaeci torc (Artabri type with "pear" terminals) Galicia, showing construction, and decoration of the hoop

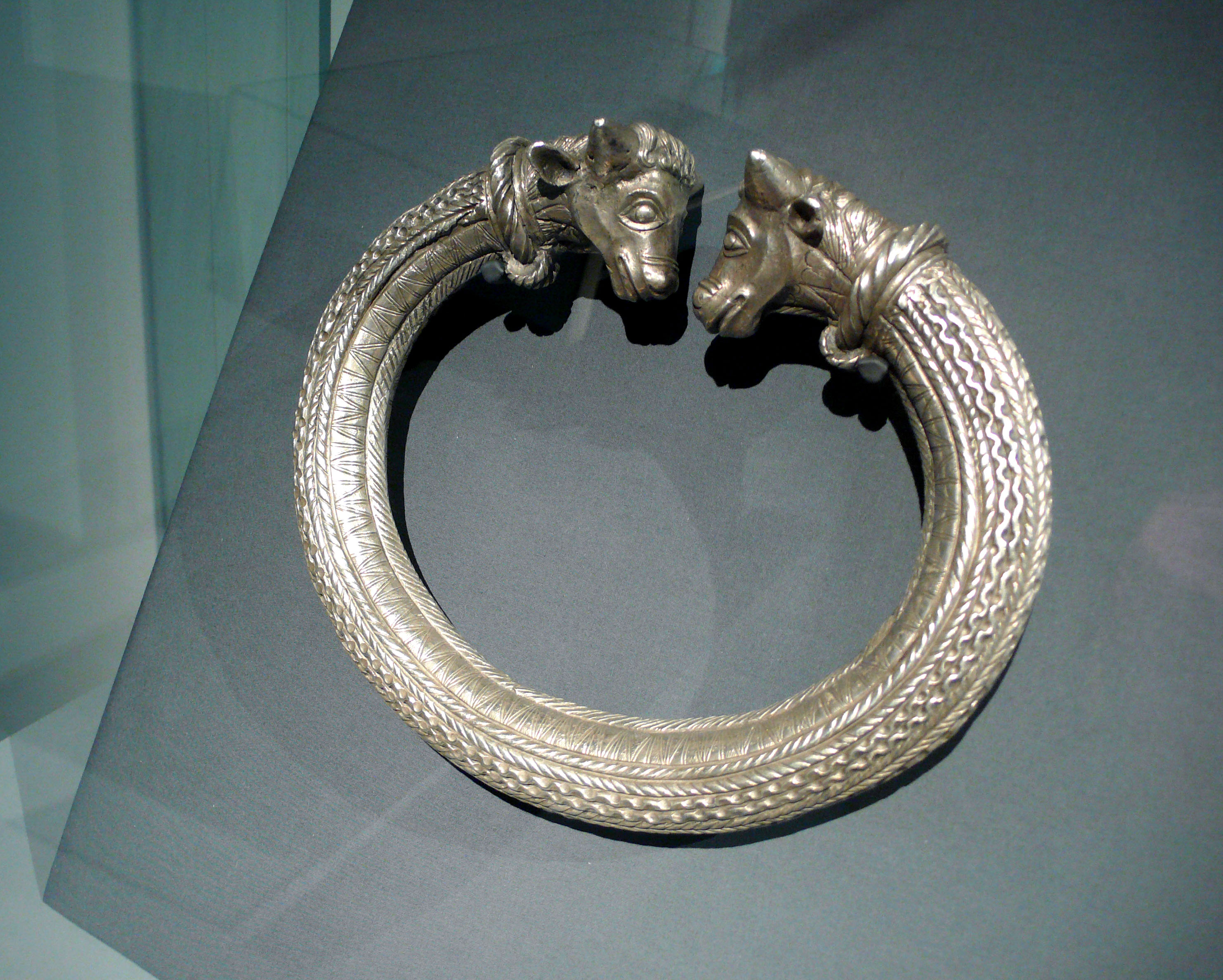
The Trichtingen silver torc with bull heads, perhaps 2nd century BC

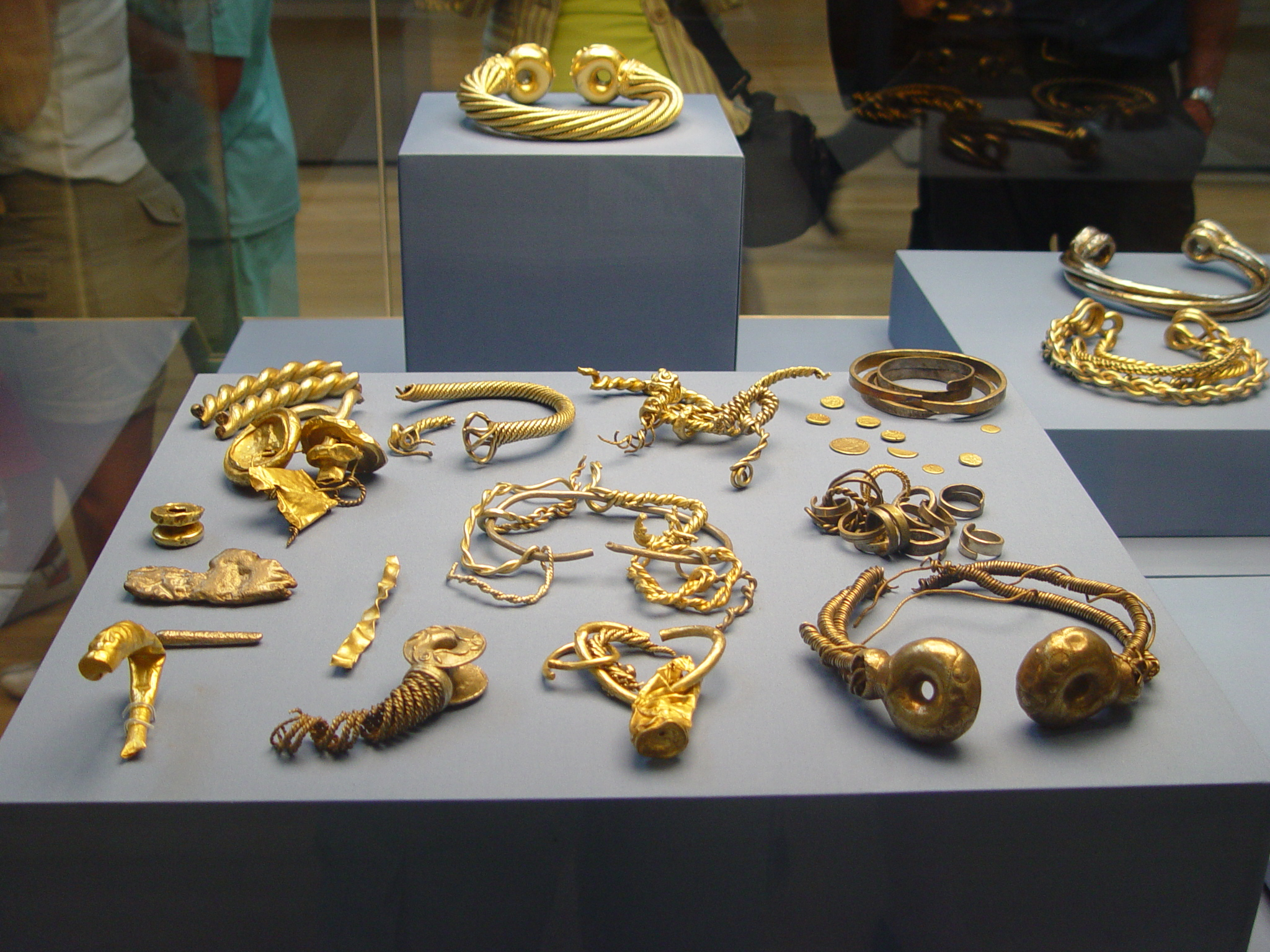
The Snettisham Hoard, perhaps the stock of a goldsmith, showing the variety of British forms, c. 75 BC

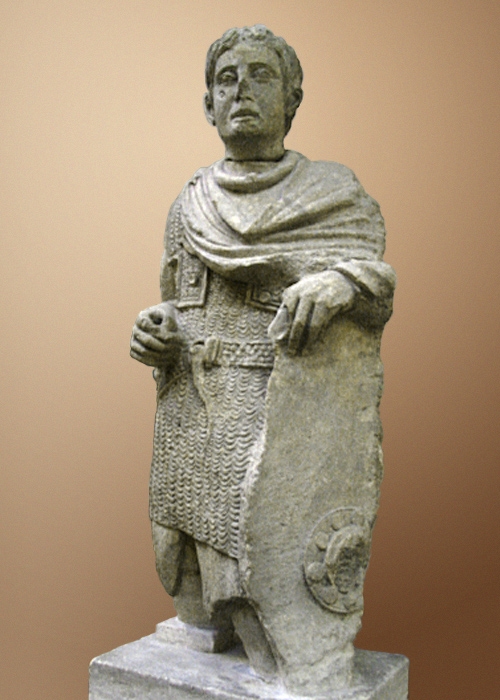
The Gallo-Roman "Warrior of Vacheres"

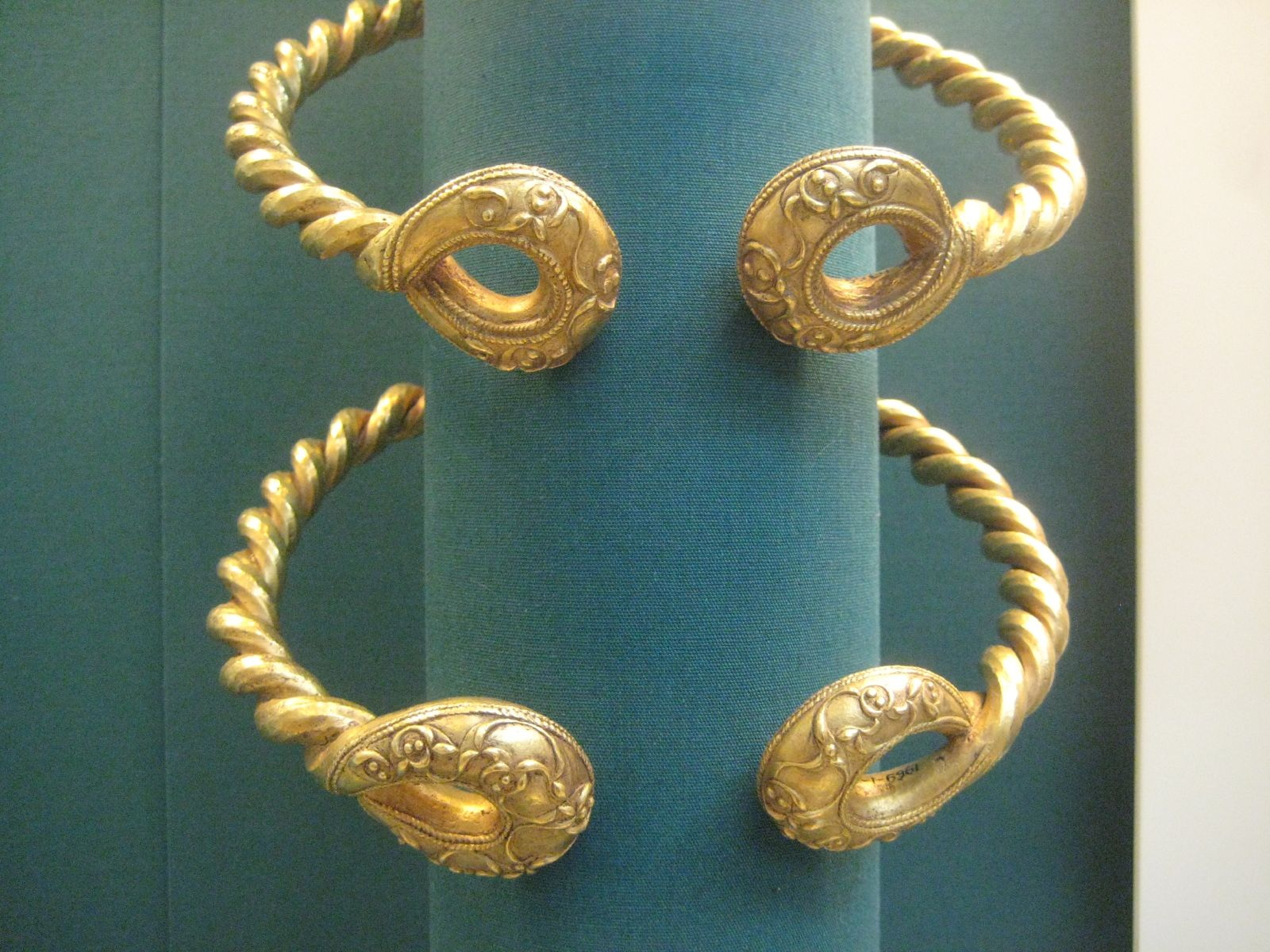
Two East Anglian looped torcs from the Ipswich Hoard

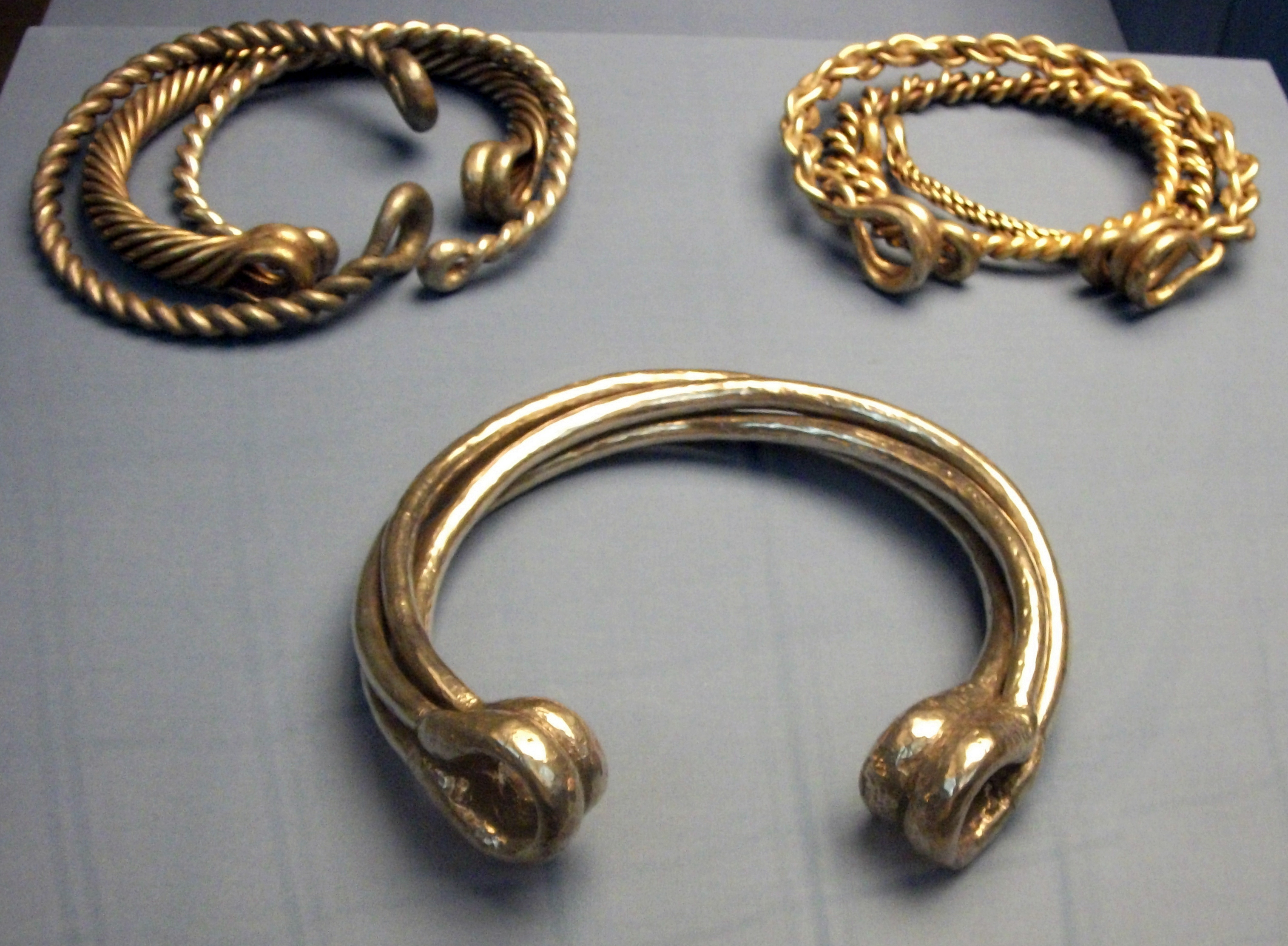
East Anglian looped torcs from the Snettisham Hoard

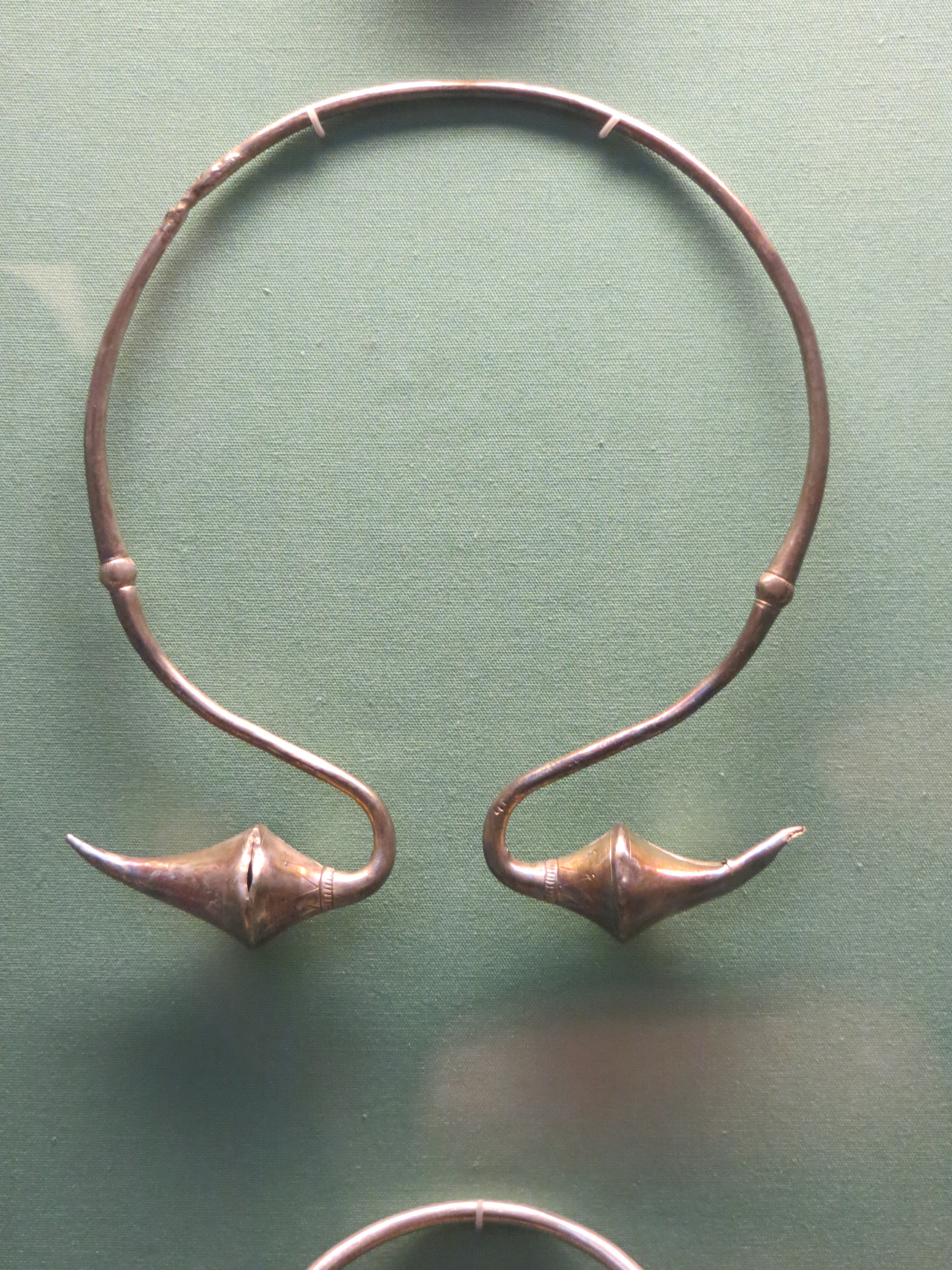
Large silver torc from the Cordoba Treasure in the British Museum

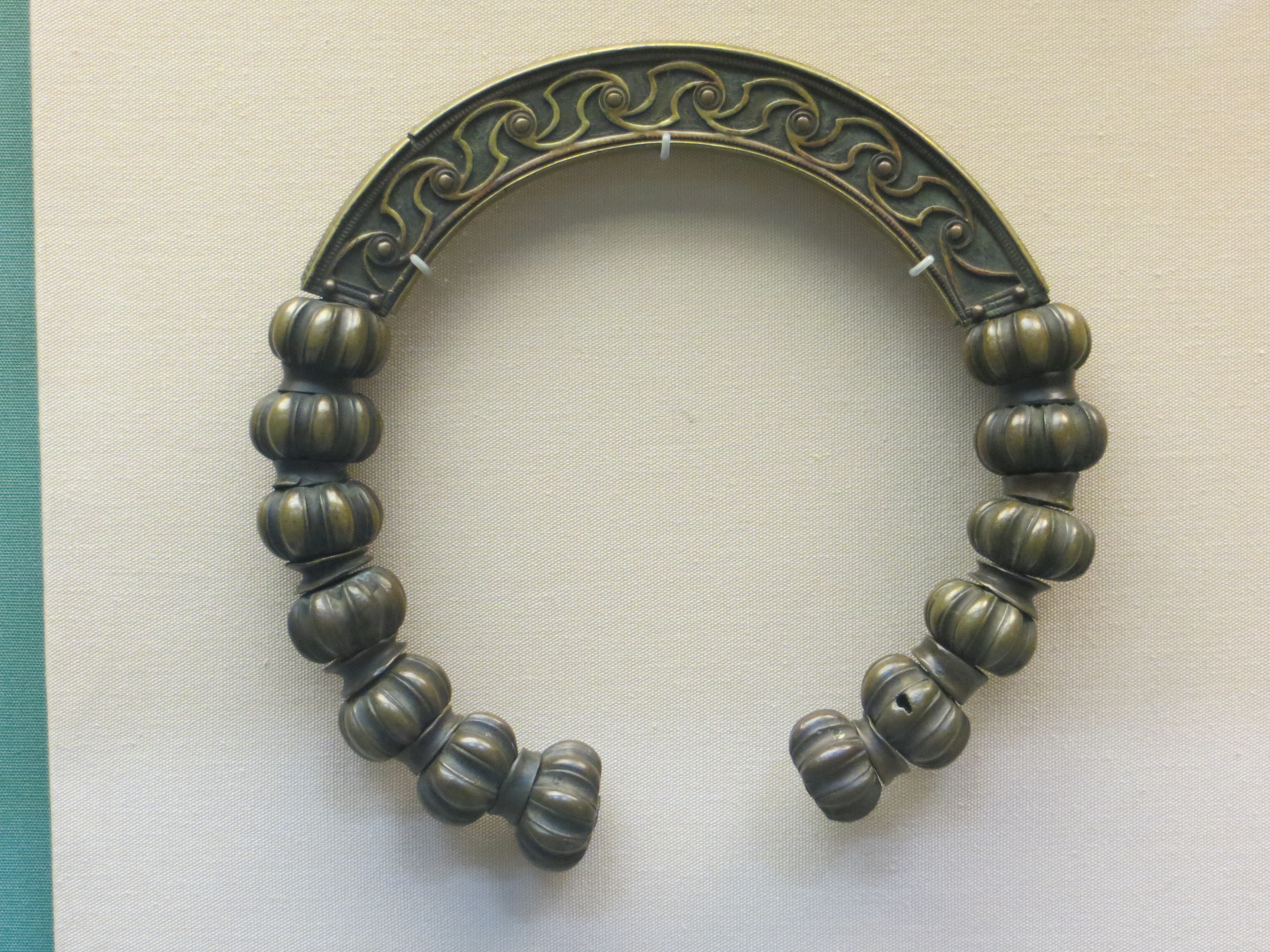
Ornate Iron Age neck collar from Lochar Moss in Dumfriesshire, Scotland (British Museum)

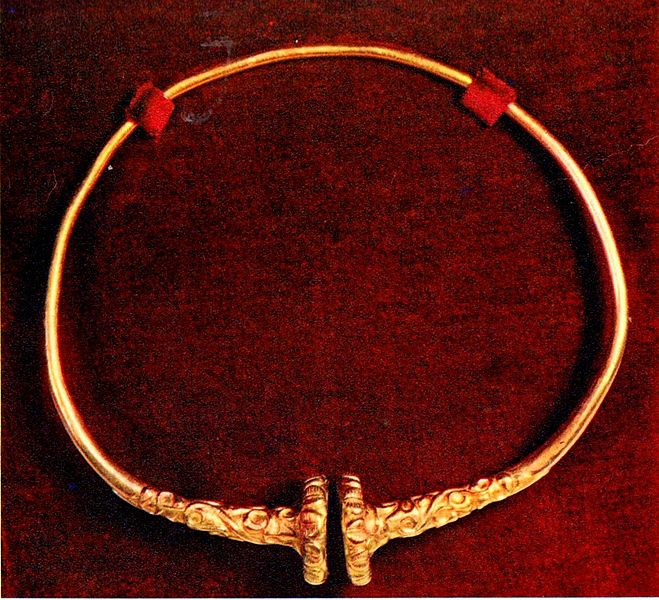
Celtic golden torque found in Marche in a gaulish necropolis, National Archaeological Museum, Ancona

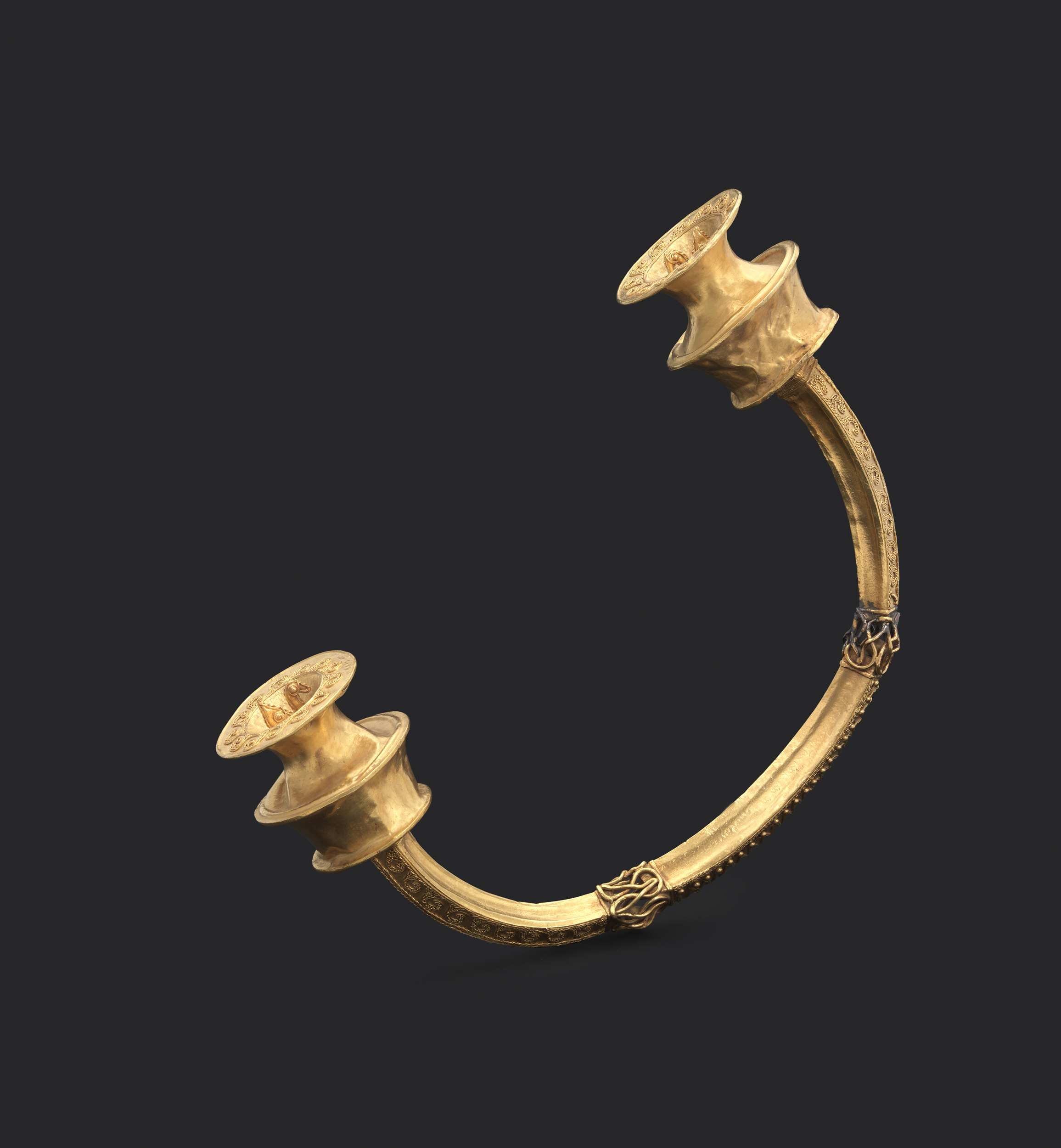
Torc, 2nd Iron Age, Castro Culture, Iberian Peninsula, National Archaeology Museum, Portugal

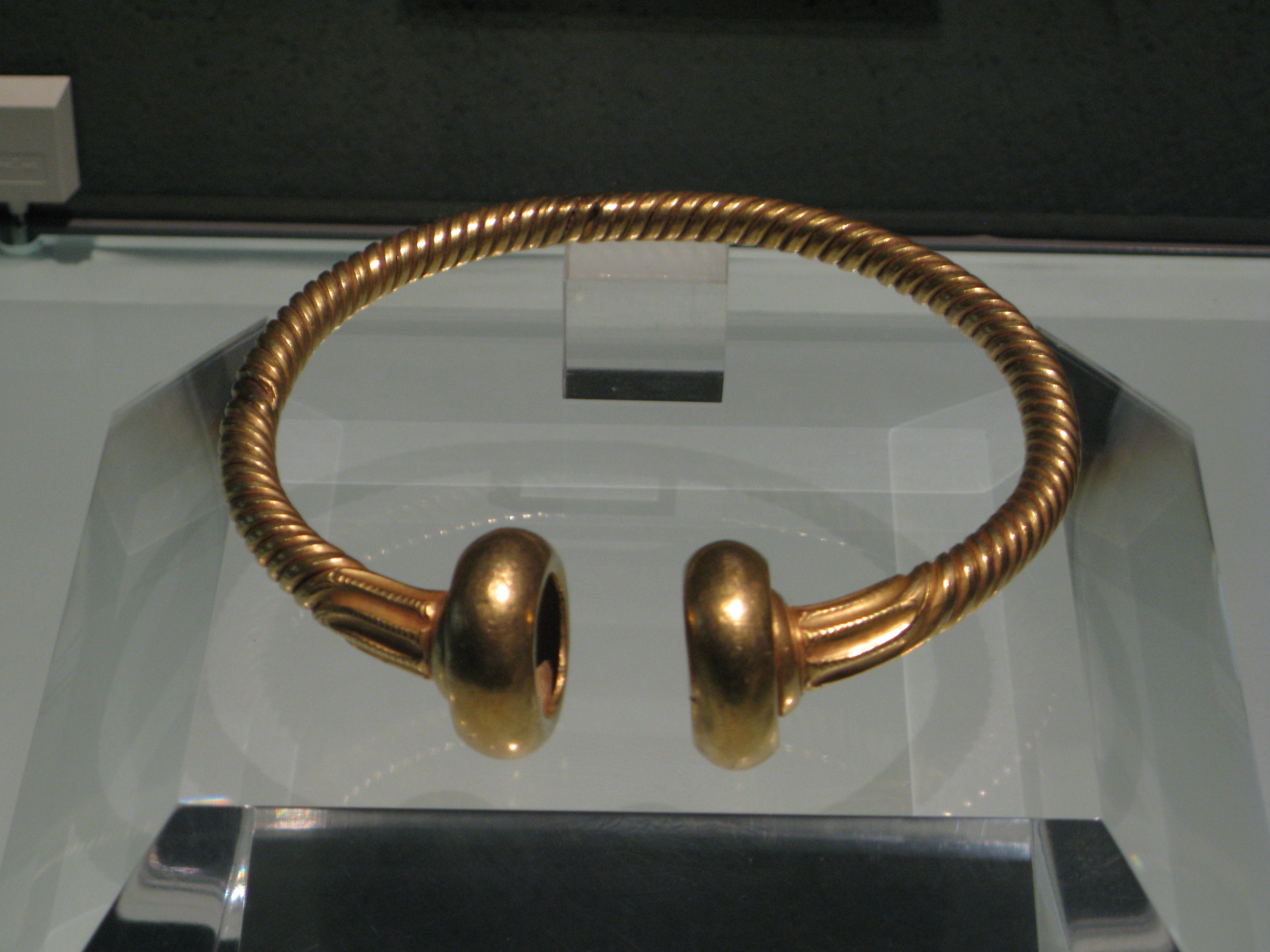
Gallic Gold Torque, Musée d'Aquitaine, Bordeaux

== See also ==
- Sedgeford Torc
- Leekfrith torcs
- Gold working in the Bronze Age British Isles
- List of Bronze Age hoards in Britain
- List of Iron Age hoards in Great Britain
- Manilla (money)
- Kalabubu, a torc of the Nias people made of coconut shell
- Bangle, a similar item but worn about the wrist
- Permanent jewellery
