= List of Bronze Age hoards in Great Britain =

The list of Bronze Age hoards in Britain comprises significant archaeological hoards of jewellery, precious and scrap metal objects and other valuable items discovered in Great Britain (England, Scotland and Wales) that are associated with the British Bronze Age, approximately 2700 BC to 8th century BC. It includes both hoards that were buried with the intention of retrieval at a later date (personal hoards, founder's hoards, merchant's hoards, and hoards of loot), and also hoards of votive offerings which were not intended to be recovered at a later date, but excludes grave goods and single items found in isolation.

== List of hoards ==
Hoard	Image	Date	Place of discovery	Year of discovery	Current Location	Contents
Adabrock Hoard		1000–800BC	Adabroc, Isle of Lewis	1910	National Museum of Scotland, Edinburgh	2 bronze socketed axeheads, 1 spearhead, 1 gouge, 1 hammer, 3 razors, fragments of decorated bronze vessel, two whetstones and beads of glass, amber and gold.
Arreton Down Hoard		1700–1500 BC	Arreton Down, Isle of Wight; 50.68196°N 1.23703°W	1735	British Museum, London	7 bronze spear-heads, 4 axes, 1 dagger, 1 halberd
Auchnacree Hoard		23rd–21st century BC	Auchnacree; Angus; 56.75°N 2.88°W	1921	Museum of Scotland, Edinburgh	2 bronze knives 3 bronze axeheads 1 bronze armlet
Beachy Head Hoard		1400–750 BC	Beachy Head, East Sussex; 50.7436494°N 0.2327261°E	1824	British Museum, London	4 gold penannular bracelets
Beaumaris Hoard		1400–1100 BC	Beaumaris, Anglesey; 53.267093°N 4.093126°W	1849	British Museum, London	2 gold penannular bracelets
Bexley Hoard		1000–750 BC	Bexley, London; 51.45996°N 0.108089°E	1906	British Museum, London	17 gold penannular bracelets (one broken in half)
Boughton Malherbe Hoard		9th century BC	Boughton Malherbe; Kent; 51.21°N 0.69°E	2011	Maidstone Museum & Art Gallery	352 bronze objects of types commonly found in northern France, comprising 75 bronze weapon fragments, 136 bronze tools and tool fragments, 42 bronze ornaments, and about 71 bronze ingots, moulds and miscellaneous objects.
Burnham-on-Crouch Hoard	Selection of bronze axes from the Burnham Hoard	Bronze Age	Burnham-on-Crouch; Essex; 51.628°N 0.815°E	2010	Colchester and Ipswich Museums	pottery vessel filled with bronze axes and other metalwork
Burton Hoard	The Burton Hoard	13th to mid 12th century BC	Burton, Wrexham; Clwyd; 53.105°N 2.965°W	2004	National Museum Cardiff	2 bronze palstaves 1 bronze chisel 1 gold torc 1 gold twisted-wire bracelet 1 gold necklace pendant 4 gold beads 3 gold rings 1 pottery vessel
Chrishall Hoard		1300-800 BC	Chrishall, Essex; 52.032798°N 0.107231°E	c. 1853	British Museum, London	5 bronze axes, 3 swords, 1 ingot, 1 spear-head
Collette Hoard (Note: The Collette Hoard is named after Collette Minns, the eight-year-old daughter of the hoard's finder, John Minns.)		10th to 9th century BC	Berwick upon Tweed; Northumberland; 55.771°N 2.007°W	2005	Great North Museum, Newcastle upon Tyne	6 socketed axes, 6 gold lock rings, and various bracelets, rings and pins
Corbridge Hoard		Middle Bronze Age	Corbridge; Northumberland; 54.962°N 1.996°W	1835	Blackgate Museum; Bailiffgate Museum	fragments of two spearheads pieces of dagger blades a flanged axe
Crundale Hoard		8th to 9th century BC	Crundale; Kent; 51.202°N 0.974°E	2003	Museum of Canterbury	188 fragments (including axe, chisel, palstave, hammer, gouge, knife, sickle, sword, bracelet, ring, and ingots)
Driffield Hoard I	14 bronze axeheads from Driffield Hoard I	Late Bronze Age	Driffield, East Riding of Yorkshire; 54.000°N 0.445°W	2016		14 bronze socketed axes and 13 bronze ingot fragments.
Driffield Hoard II		Late Bronze Age	Driffield, East Riding of Yorkshire; 54.000°N 0.445°W	2016		36 complete and 23 broken or fragmented socketed bronze axes, two nearly complete bun-shaped bronze ingots, and 91 bronze ingot fragments.
Duddingston Loch Hoard		950–750 BC	Duddingston Loch; Edinburgh; 55.94°N 3.15°W	1778	Museum of Scotland, Edinburgh	44 bronze items consisting of the ring of a large cauldron and fragments of spearheads, swords and dagger blades; point of a bronze spearhead; contorted bronze sword, broken in two, with three rivet holes and a slot in the hilt plate; contorted point of a bronze sword; blade of a bronze sword broken off under the hilt and bent back at the point.
Eggleston Hoard		1000-750 BC	Eggleston, County Durham; 54.600°N 2.000°W	2019		Several bronze spearheads and knives, as well as some amber and jet beads
Fittleworth Hoard		1400-1100 BC	Fittleworth, West Sussex; 50.965636°N 0.563789°W	1995	British Museum, London	2 gold penannular bracelets, 35 gold bars, 2 fragments of a torc, 2 rings
Gaerwen Hoard		1000-750 BC	Gaerwen, Anglesey; 53.254243°N 4.302382°W	1852	British Museum, London	2 gold lock rings, 2 gold penannular bracelets
Havering hoard		900-800 BCE	Rainham, London (undisclosed site)	2018	Unknown (exhibited at Museum of London Docklands from 3 April to 25 October 2020 and subsequently at Havering Museum)	Swords, socketed axe heads, spear heads, knives, daggers, woodwork tools, bracelets, ingots, and other items, weighing more than 45 kg in total
Heathery Burn Cave Hoard		1000-750 BC	Heathery Burn Cave, County Durham; 54.765549°N 2.020794°W	1866	British Museum, London, Ashmolean Museum, Oxford, Yorkshire Museum, York	1 gold penannular bracelet, 1 gold lock-ring, 36 bronze awls, 20 pins, 14 axes, 11 rings, 11 cheek-pieces, 10 bracelets, 10 spear-heads, 8 pendants, 7 vessels, 6 wheels, 6 spatulas, 2 toggles, 2 knives, 2 swords, 4 scoops or chisels, 4 phaleras, casting moulds, fittings, a bowl and a bucket plus other miscellaneous items
Heights of Brae Hoard		8th to 7th century BC	Heights of Brae; Dingwall, Highland; 57.616°N 4.476°W	1967 and 1979	Museum of Scotland, Edinburgh	3 gold cup-ended ornaments, 5 gold penannular armlets, and 1 corrugated gold band (a cup-ended ornament, a pennanular armlet and two additional items that are now lost were found during ploughing in 1967; the remaining seven items were found during archaeological investigation in 1979).
Hollingbourne Hoard	Bronze axes from the Hollingbourne Hoard	10th to 9th century BC	Hollingbourne; Kent; 51.267°N 0.641°E	2003	Maidstone Museum & Art Gallery	12 bronze axes and axe fragments 2 bronze sword hilt fragments 6 bronze sword blade fragments 2 bronze spearhead fragments 14 bronze ingots
Hollingbury Hoard		1400-1250 BC	Hollingbury, East Sussex; 50.8589774°N 0.145044°W	1825	British Museum, London	4 bronze armlets, 3 rings, 1 palstave, 1 torc
Horsehope Craig Hoard		7th–6th century BC	near Peebles, Peeblesshire; 55.577200°N 3.261175°W	1865	Tweeddale Museum and Gallery, Peebles and National Museum of Scotland	15 bronze rings, 2 socketed axes, 1 rapier, 28 objects in all, thought to be elements of horse harness and cart mountings
Husband's Bosworth Hoard		Late Bronze Age	Husbands Bosworth; Leicestershire; 52.453°N 1.056°W	1801	unknown	4 looped and socketed celts 2 socketed celts 3 socketed gouges 2 spearheads 1 flat ferrule
Isleham Hoard		8th century BC	Isleham; Cambridgeshire; 52.343°N 0.441°E	1959	West Stow Anglo-Saxon Village; Museum of Archaeology and Anthropology, University of Cambridge	6,500 pieces of worked and unworked bronze
Lambourn Hoard	The Lambourn Hoard	14th to 12th century BC	Lambourn; Berkshire; 51.509°N 1.531°W	2004	West Berkshire Museum	2 gold armlets 3 gold bracelets
Langdon Bay Hoard		13th century BC	In the English Channel at Langdon Bay; Kent; 51.13°N 1.351°E	1974	British Museum, London (Note: The Langdon Bay Hoard is currently on loan to the Dover Museum.)	360 items of scrap metal, including bronze axes of a French type
Langton Matravers Hoard		7th century BC	Langton Matravers, near Swanage; Dorset; 50.609°N 2.006°W	2008	Dorset Museum, Dorchester	276 complete socketed bronze axes, 107 halves of socketed bronze axes and 117 fragments of socketed bronze axes in three adjacent pits and one pit further away
Lewes Hoard	Items from the Lewes Hoard	16th to 12th century BC	near Lewes; East Sussex; 51.06°N 2.08°W	2011		79 objects in a pottery vessel, including 3 bronze palstaves, 5 bronze bracelets, 8 bronze finger rings, 4 bronze tutuli (also known as Monkswood ornaments), 4 gold discs, 1 bronze pin, 19 amber beads and 4 bronze torcs
Llanarmon-yn-Iâl Hoard		16th to mid 8th century BC	Llanarmon-yn-Iâl; Denbighshire; 53.100°N 3.210°W	1982	Amgueddfa Cymru – Museum Wales	1 socketed bronze axe, 2 gold bracelets, a broken gold link, and a gold ingot
Lockington Hoard		21st to 20th century BC	Lockington; Leicestershire; 52.848°N 1.308°W	1994	British Museum, London	fragments of 2 Beaker style pots 1 copper alloy dagger 2 embossed gold-sheet armlets
Manorbier Hoard		10th to 9th century BC	Manorbier; Dyfed; 51.65°N 4.80°W	2010		19 bronze and copper artefacts, including socketed axes, a gouge, a piece of a sword blade, a circular dish-headed pin, ingots and bronze casting bi-products
Marston St. Lawrence Hoard		1300-800 BC	Marston St. Lawrence, Northamptonshire; 52.078284°N 1.220759°W	c.1897	British Museum, London	4 bronze spear-heads, 2 swords, 2 stone whetstones, 1 bracelet, 1 ferrule
Meldreth Hoard		1300-800 BC	Meldreth, Cambridgeshire; 52.101092°N 0.006779°E	1880	British Museum, London	25 bronze axes, 15 ingots, 5 spear-heads, 4 swords, 2 bucket handles, 1 gouge, 1 razor, 1 finger ring, 1 chisel
Mickleham Hoard		10th–11th century BC	Mickleham; Surrey; 51.268°N 0.321°W	2003		2 socketed axes 1 chape
Migdale Hoard		23rd to 20th century BC	Bonar Bridge; Sutherland; 57.904°N 4.327°W	1900	Museum of Scotland, Edinburgh	1 bronze axe head sets of bronze bangles and anklets a set of jet and cannel coal buttons bronze hair ornaments fragments of a bronze headdress
Milton Keynes Hoard	Gold torcs and bracelets from the Milton Keynes Hoard	mid 12th to late 9th century BC	Monkston, Milton Keynes; Buckinghamshire; 52.036°N 0.700°W	2000	British Museum, London	2 gold torcs 3 gold bracelets 1 bronze fragment 1 pottery vessel
Moor Sand Hoard		13th century BC	Off Prawle Point, near Salcombe; Devon; 50.200°N 3.725°W	1977	British Museum, London	six bronze swords or sword fragments and two bronze palstaves
Morvah Hoard		1000–750 BC	Morvah, Cornwall; 50.161148°N 5.638244°W	1884	British Museum, London	6 gold penannular bracelets
New Bradwell (or Wolverton) Hoard		mid 12th to late 9th century BC	New Bradwell, Milton Keynes; Buckinghamshire; 52.065°N 0.798°W	1879	Buckinghamshire County Museum	9 bronze socketed axes 3 broken axes 1 palstave 2 spearheads a leaf-shaped sword (broken into 4 pieces)
Ockham Hoard		Middle Bronze Age	Ockham, Surrey	2013	Guildford Museum	six unlooped palstave axes of which four are ribbed examples, and two plain; two Sussex loop bracelets; and two spiral finger rings
Peebles Hoard (unofficial name as of 10 August 2020)		9th century BC ??	(undisclosed site) near Peebles	2020	National Museums Scotland	bronze horse harness fittings
Plymstock Hoard		2150–1600 BC	Plymstock, Devon; 50.356944°N 4.09°W	1869	British Museum, London	12 bronze axes, 3 daggers, 1 spear-head, 1 chisel
Rossett Hoard	The Rossett Hoard	10th to 9th century BC	Rossett; Wrexham; 53.109°N 2.945°W	2002	National Museum Cardiff	1 faceted axe 1 tanged knife 4 pieces of gold bracelet stored inside the axe
Selborne Hoard		1400-1250 BC	Woolmer Forest near Selborne, Hampshire; 51.083993°N 0.858523°W	1840	British Museum, London	3 bronze armlets, 2 rings, 1 bracelet, 1 spear-head, 1 palstave
St Erth hoards	Bronze axe head from St Erth hoard	8th–9th century BC	St Erth; Cornwall; 50.166°N 5.437°W	2002–2003	Royal Cornwall Museum	2 gold ornament fragments Bronze/copper hoard 1: 5 sword pieces, 3 socketed axe pieces, 1 socketed gouge piece, 1 knife fragment, 1 plate-like fragment, 16 ingot fragments or amorphous lumps Bronze/copper hoard 2: 1 winged axe, 1 plate-like spill, 15 ingot fragments
St Mellons Hoard		Late Bronze Age	St Mellons, Cardiff; Glamorgan; 51.519°N 3.114°W	1983	National Museum Cardiff	25 bronze socketed axes and one casting jet
Stogursey Hoard (1870)		8th century BC	Wick Farm, Stogursey; Somerset; 51.189°N 3.111°W	1870	Museum of Somerset	20 sword fragments 29 socketed axes 37 socketed axe fragments 2 palstaves 2 gouges 2 knives or daggers 1 chape 20 spearheads 34 other bronze fragments
Stonnall Hoard	Some contemporary sketches of the hoard	Bronze Age	Gainsborough Hill Farm, Stonnall; Staffordshire; 52.622°N 1.891°W	1824	Unknown	2 swords 1 spearhead and 2 fragments of same 4 ferrules 2 cylinders 3 rings 2 pommels 3 celts 1 lump of copper 1 lump of lead
Stretham Hoard		1300–1000 BC	Stretham, Cambridgeshire; 52.349933°N 0.220663°E	1850	British Museum, London, Hunt Museum, Limerick	1 gold torc, 1 gold bracelet, 6 ribbed rings, 1 bronze rapier
Tarves Hoard		1000–850 BC	Tarves, Aberdeenshire; 57.3570858°N 2.2234368°W	1858	British Museum, London	3 bronze swords, 1 pommel, 1 chape and 2 pins
Tisbury Hoard	Bronze axe heads from the Tisbury hoard	9th to 8th century BC	Tisbury; Wiltshire; 51.06°N 2.09°W	2011		114 bronze items, including weapons and tools (sword hilts, sword blades, spearheads, axeheads, gouges, chisels, sickles and knives), pieces of jewellery, razors and other miscellaneous items
Tisbury Treasure		1100–750 BC	Tisbury, Wiltshire; 51.06°N 2.09°W	Before 1897	British Museum, London	6 gold penannular bracelets
Towednack Hoard		10th century BC	Towednack; Cornwall; 50.191°N 5.520°W	1931	British Museum, London	2 twisted gold neckrings 4 gold bracelets 3 lengths of gold rod
Urquhart Hoard		1400–1100 BC	Urquhart, Moray; 57.651853°N 3.19608°W	1857	British Museum, London, Marischal Museum, Aberdeen, National Museum of Scotland, Edinburgh	36 or 37 originally, 7 gold ribbon torcs in BM, 3 in NMS and 1 in MM
Walderslade Hoard		1000–750 BC	Walderslade, Kent; 51.33494°N 0.5187°E	1965	British Museum, London	2 gold penannular bracelets
Wanlass Hoard		1100–750 BC	Wanlass, North Yorkshire; 54.300885°N 1.9032°W	1862	British Museum, London	4 gold penannular bracelets
Whalley Hoard		1000–750 BC	Whalley, Lancashire; 53.82454°N 2.403295°W	1966	British Museum, London	1 gold penannular bracelet, 1 gold lock-ring, 2 axes, 1 knife, 1 sword blade, 1 socketed gouge and 1 lead stud

== See also ==
- List of hoards in Britain
- List of Iron Age hoards in Britain
- List of Roman hoards in Britain
