= Woodfield =

Woodfield may refer to:

== Places ==
- Woodfield, South Carolina
- Woodfield Mall, Schaumburg, Illinois
- Woodfield, Victoria, Australia

== People with the surname ==
- Charmian Woodfield (1929–2014), British archaeologist
- Clarrie Woodfield (1901–1968), Australian rules footballer
- David Woodfield (1943–2025), English footballer
- Ern Woodfield (1888–1974), Australian rules footballer
- Les Woodfield (1899–1974), Australian rules footballer
- Philip Woodfield (1923–2000), British civil servant
- Randall Woodfield (born 1950), American convicted murder and possible serial killer
- William Woodfield (1928–2001), American photographer and screenwriter
