= Milton Keynes Hoard =

Bronze Age hoards found in and around Milton Keynes, England

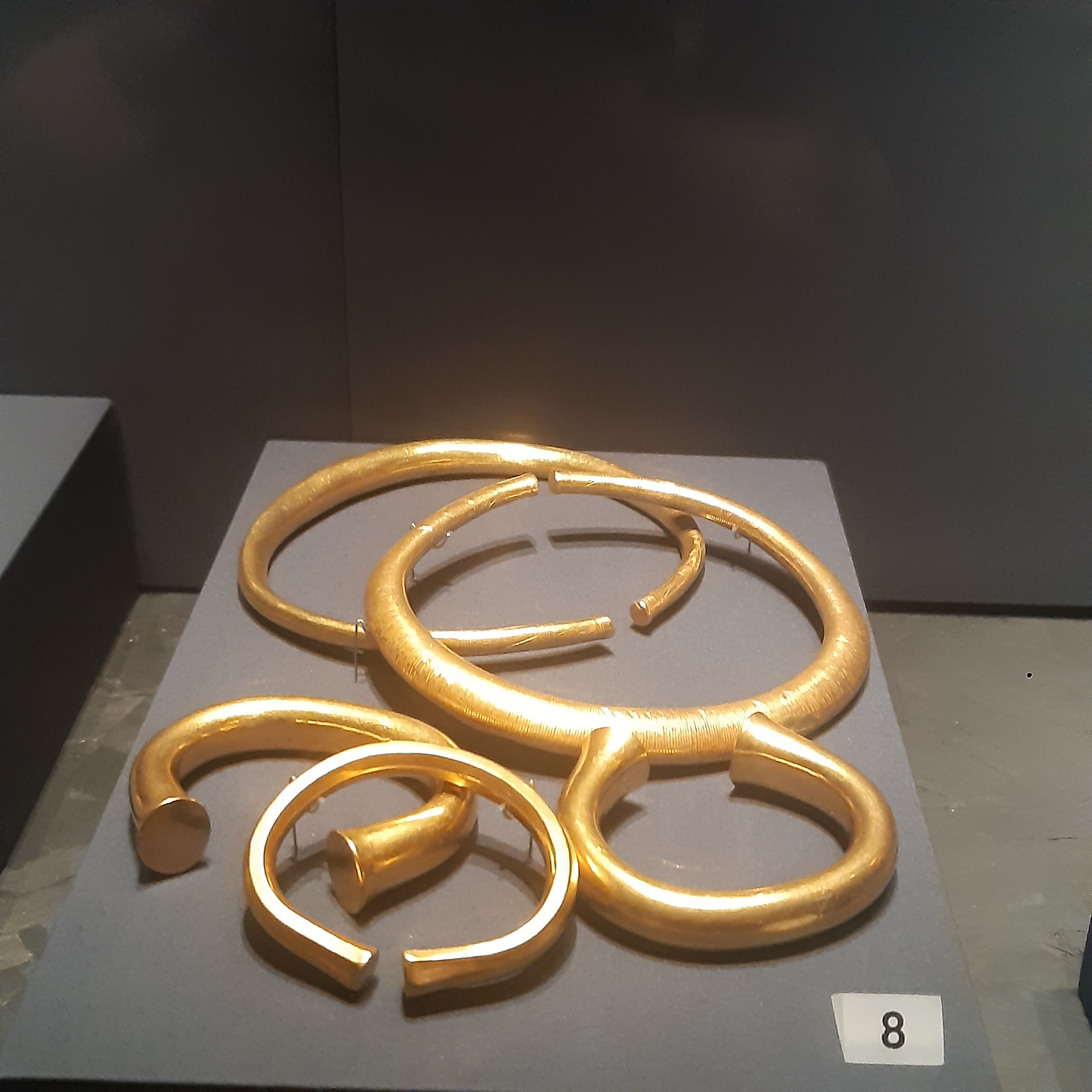
- Milton Keynes Hoard of torcs and bracelets at the British Museum
- Material: Gold, bronze, pottery
- Size: 2 gold torcs, 3 gold bracelets, bronze rod fragment, pottery bowl
- Period/culture: Bronze Age Britain (middle to late)
- Discovered: Monkston Park, Milton Keynes by Gordon Heritage and Michael Rutland in September 2000
- Present location: British Museum, London
- Identification: 2000 (Fig 5); P&EE 2002.7–1.1–7

Location
- Approximate location of find spot

The Milton Keynes Hoard is a hoard of Bronze Age gold found in September 2000 in a field at Monkston Park in Milton Keynes, England. The hoard consisted of two torcs, three bracelets, and a fragment of bronze rod contained in a pottery vessel. The inclusion of pottery in the find enabled it to be dated to around 1150–800 BC.

Weighing in at 2.020 kg (4.45 lb), the hoard was described by the British Museum as "one of the biggest concentrations of Bronze Age gold known from Great Britain" and "important for providing a social and economic picture for the period". The hoard was valued at £290,000 and is now in the British Museum. (Note: About £544,000 today, based on the Retail Price Index only. Inflation in the art and antiquities market may be considerably more.)

Several other antiquities, including Romano-British hoards, have been found within a 10–12 miles (16–19 km) radius of the centre of Milton Keynes.

== Discovery ==
On 7 July 2000, Michael Rutland and Gordon Heritage were metal detecting in a field in what is now Monkston Park in Milton Keynes, at the invitation of local archaeologists who were closing a nearby dig, when they discovered the hoard. They immediately informed the archaeologists (Brian Giggins and Paul and Charmian Woodfield) – an action which was later cited as imperative in preserving the historical context of the find. Hayley Bullock of the British Museum was also praised for acting quickly to preserve the site and expedite excavation. The metal detectorists who found the hoard were rewarded with 60% of the value after the authorities decided that the landowners' claim that the finders had searched without permission was unfounded.

== Significance ==
The hoard in its entirety comprises two large gold torcs, three smaller gold bracelets, a fragment of bronze rod or wire, and an undecorated fineware post-Deverel-Rimbury type bowl with a brown ceramic fabric, standing 100 mm (3.9 in) high.

The heaviest item (see specifications below, item 1) weighed 626.9 g (22.11 oz); the second torc and bracelet (items 2 and 4 respectively), following X-ray fluorescence analysis at the British Museum, contained the largest amount of gold at 85% each.

The total weight is 2.020 kg (4.45 lb), and the British Museum described it as "one of the biggest concentrations of Bronze Age gold known from Britain and seems to flaunt wealth."

The finders' reporting the hoard in good time ensured "certain association between a gold hoard and pottery for the British Middle to Late Bronze Age (about 1500–800 BC)" could be established. However, the inclusion of pottery in the find confirms and maybe refines the hoard dating. Furthermore, the British Museum stated, "The find provides an invaluable link between gold types and the broader social and economic picture for Bronze Age Britain."

== Valuation and disposition ==
A coroner's inquest declared the finds treasure and valued them at £290,000. Heritage and Rutland were entitled to a share of this with the landowners, English Partnerships. However, because the owners of the land disputed the finders' right to search the land the Treasure Valuation Committee increased the finders' share to 60%, after finding this claim to be unwarranted.

The British Museum acquired the hoard, although replicas were made and displayed at the independently run Milton Keynes Museum to commemorate the origin of the find spot.

== Item specifications ==
Item No.	Description	Shape	Cross-section	Diameter	Max bar thickness	Weight	Gold content (approx)
1	Torc 1	Penannular	elliptical	143.5 mm × 135 mm (5.65 in × 5.31 in)	15.1 mm × 11.4 mm (0.59 in × 0.45 in)	626.9 g (22.11 oz)	76%
2	Torc 2	penannular	elliptical	145.9 mm × 134.5 mm (5.74 in × 5.30 in)	12.9 mm × 10 mm (0.51 in × 0.39 in)	441.3 g (15.57 oz)	85%
3	Bracelet 1	C-shaped	elliptical	84.7 mm × 65 mm (3.33 in × 2.56 in)	14.5 mm × 10.8 mm (0.57 in × 0.43 in)	382.6 g (13.50 oz)	84%
4	Bracelet 2	C-shaped	elliptical	81.4 mm × 68.5 mm (3.20 in × 2.70 in)	14.4 mm × 11.2 mm (0.57 in × 0.44 in)	408 g (14.4 oz)	85%
5	Bracelet 3	D-shaped	octagonal	73.6 mm × 62.5 mm (2.90 in × 2.46 in)	9.2 mm × 7 mm (0.36 in × 0.28 in)	162.5 g (5.73 oz)	84%
6	Bronze fragment	rod or wire	n/a	unspecified	unspecified	unspecified	0%
7	Pottery vessel	n/a	n/a	Body: 210 mm (8.3 in); Base: 100 mm (3.9 in); Height: 100 mm (3.9 in)	n/a	unspecified	0%

== Other hoards from Milton Keynes and surrounding area ==
Before the Roman conquest of Britain of 43 the Catuvellauni tribe controlled this area from their hillfort at Danesborough, near Woburn Sands. Under Roman occupation, the area thrived due mainly to the major Roman road, Iter III – later known as Watling Street – which runs through the area, giving rise to an associated Roman town at the Romano-British settlement MAGIOVINIUM – now Fenny Stratford. The history of Milton Keynes shows that settlement can be traced back to 2000 BCE; therefore, it is perhaps unsurprising that many other hoards have been found within a 10–12 miles (16–19 km) radius of its modern centre.

=== Castlethorpe ===
52.093°N 0.840°W
In about 1827, a Romano-British hoard of coins, a pair of silver snakeshead bracelets (both inscribed underneath), silver finger ring with carnelian intaglio. Found within a ceramic jar.

=== Magiovinium (Fenny Stratford) ===
51.9975°N 0.7083°W

Fenny Stratford stater

Possibly the oldest known gold coin in Britain was found in 1849, here near the site of MAGIOVINIUM, a gold stater of the mid-2nd century BC. The British Museum described it as "a superb example of the Iron Age die-engraver's art".

Bletchley hoards

Although known as the "Bletchley" hoards, two coin hoards were also found at or near the site of MAGIOVINIUM, consisting of silver denarii, in 1967 and 1987.

=== Stony Stratford Hoard ===
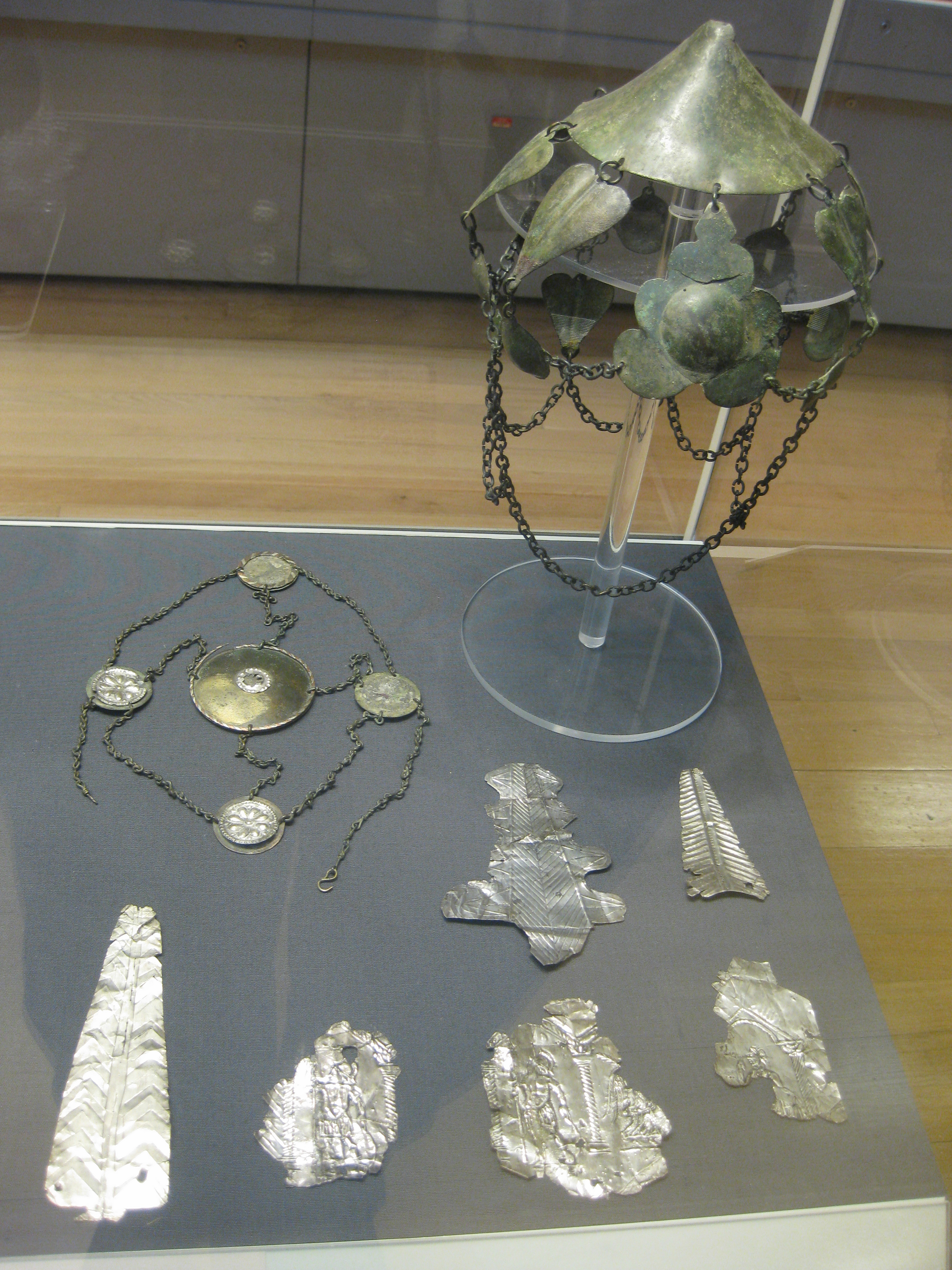
Part of the Stony Stratford Hoard, on display in the British Museum

Passenham 52.0534°N 0.8626°W

In 1789, at "Windmill Field near Stony Stratford", (Note: The precise location is unknown. The "windmill field" is conjectured to have been in nearby Passenham, a village in the parish of Old Stratford, Northamptonshire (just across the river Great Ouse from Stony Stratford). Other Northamptonshire sources concur, but not the British Museum.) an urn was uncovered that contained between 50 and 60 fragments of silver and gilt bronze plaques. "In addition there are two objects sometimes described as ensigns or head-dresses". The fragments include images of the Roman deities Mars, Apollo, and Victoria and inscriptions ascribed to Jupiter and Vulcan, leading to theories that this was a votive hoard at a Roman temple. The hoard is now kept at the British Museum.

=== 1849 find on Whaddon Chase and the Little Horwood Hoard ===
Whaddon: 52.000°N 0.828°W Little Horwood: 51.968°N 0.850°W

In 1849, while ploughing land near Whaddon, farm workers discovered a hoard of Iron Age gold staters. The amount found, depending on reports, varies between 450 to 800 and 2,000, but the lack of precision in quantifying the hoard was because "[t]he discovery attracted many persons to the spot, some of whom contrived to get possession of nearly 100 specimens... About 320 reached the hands of [landowner] Mr Lowndes". It was also poorly recorded in the first instance.

In December 2006, in Little Horwood, three metal detectorists found 73 staters, dated from 60 to 50 BC, of the type that had come to be known as the Whaddon Chase type. Ian Leins, from the British Museum Department of Coins and Medals, stated in the 2005–06 Treasure Annual Report that the proximity to the Whaddon Chase find spot and the type found made it "likely" that this find "represent[s] part of the original hoard that remained undiscovered in 1849." The 2006 staters were valued at a total of £25,000 (Note: About £42,000 today.) and are now in Buckinghamshire County Museum.

The 2006 staters were discovered by Andrew and Edward Clarkson, and Gordon Heritage – coincidentally one of the discoverers of the Monkston Bronze Age gold hoard. In October 2007, the three men found a further two staters in the same area, also deemed to be part of the original 1849 hoard.

The Whaddon Chase hoard remains the largest of its kind, with only the discovery of the Wickham Market Hoard in 2008 – where 840 gold staters were uncovered in Suffolk – coming close thereafter.

=== 1858 coin hoard at Weston Underwood ===
52.160°N 0.755°W

On New Year's Eve, 1858 near Weston Underwood, an earthenware vessel was found in Whites Close. It contained 166 denarii from the 1st and 2nd century AD, 4 legionary coins, 1 brass coin, an Augustus from 42 BC and 4 of Mark Antony from 30 BC. Also found was a complete 2nd century Samian bowl and other pieces of pottery, including many broken sherds, and even human and horse bones. The Samian bowl now resides at Buckinghamshire County Museum.

=== 1879 Bronze Age hoard at New Bradwell ===
52.0646°N 0.7978°W

In 1879, at New Bradwell, a Bronze Age hoard of weapons was found in a "deep cist filled with black earth" where the County Arms Hotel used to stand. The hoard comprised nine socketed axes, three broken axes, one palstave, two Spearheads and a leaf-shaped sword which had broken into four pieces. The collection now resides at Aylesbury Museum.

=== Little Brickhill excavations 1962–1964 ===
51.996°N 0.7102°W

In July 1962, a Romano-British hoard of coins was found in Little Brickhill (just south of Milton Keynes), in very close proximity to Watling Street. It consisted of 251 loose coins and an estimated 400 more which were corroded and had become somewhat amalgamated. The coins, dated 360–365, are now in the possession of the Bletchley Archaeological Society.

Two years later, excavation work nearby uncovered a stone and timber building. The building had been destroyed by fire and 4th century pottery was found on a cobbled floor, along with various sherds from the 4th and 11th to 12th centuries, remnants of a 13th-century jug, glass and jet beads, and around 43 coins from Tetricus I (270–273) to Gratian (375–383). The excavation also revealed the burial place of at least 44 people.

=== More coins at Little Brickhill in 1967 and 1987 ===
51.9923°N 0.7001°W

On 20 May 1967, at a site not far from the 1962–1964 Little Brickhill finds, a mechanical digger uncovered a hoard of 296 denarii from the 1st to 2nd century. Hearth tools, pottery, and a fragment of whetstone were also found. Five of the coins are now at the British Museum and the remainder are at the Buckinghamshire County Museum.

After excavation, more finds included a bronze brooch and terret ring. The wider implications of the excavation were that it was discovered that occupation of the area had passed through five phases from the 1st to 4th century of the Romano-British empire.

627 coins were found in 1987 which were ascertained to be from the same hoard.

=== 1987 Walton hoard ===
52.0198°N 0.7117°W

In 1987, metal detectorists found 97 bronze coins spanning 307–317 at a Walton building site. It was speculated that this was not the entire sum of the hoard.

=== 2014 Lenborough hoard ===
51.977°N 0.981°W

The Lenborough Hoard of 5,251 eleventh century coins was found at Lenborough, near Padbury (13 miles (21 km) west of Milton Keynes) on 21 December 2014. Stored in a lead bucket, the hoard included coins of Æthelred the Unready and Canute

== Maps ==
Locations of hoard-sites in and around Milton Keynes.
Watling Street north of St Albans. The map shows the Roman towns established along Watling Street by the end of the first century AD.

== See also ==
- History of Milton Keynes
- Grade I listed buildings in the City of Milton Keynes
- List of Bronze Age hoards in Great Britain
