= Havering hoard =

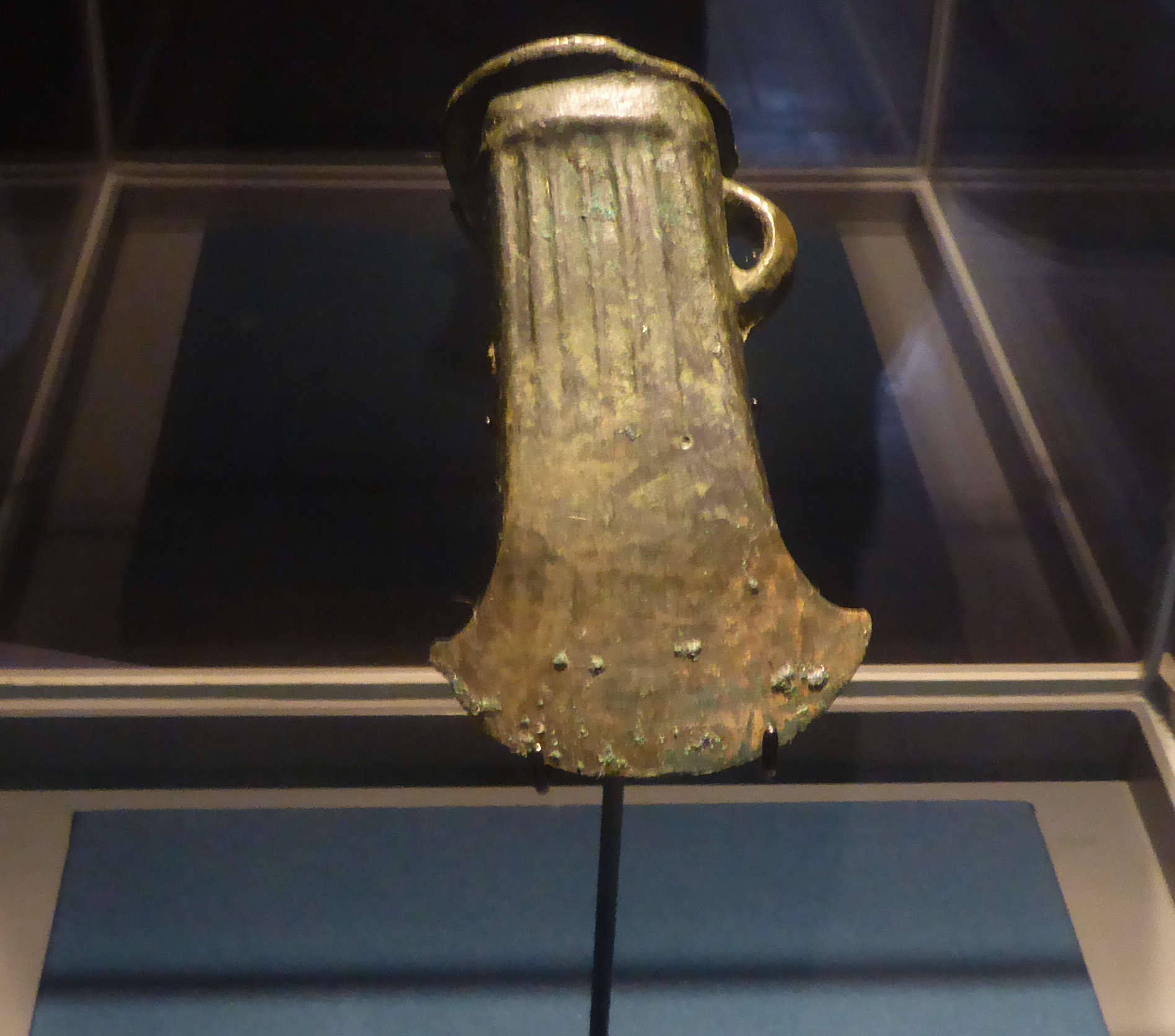
Axe from Havering hoard 1

The Havering hoard is a hoard of 453 late Bronze Age (900 to 800 BC) artefacts found at a site overlooking the River Thames in Rainham, London, in 2018. It is the largest bronze-age hoard to be found in London and the third-largest in the United Kingdom. The discovery was made during an archaeological investigation of the site prior to its use for gravel extraction. The finds included weapons, tools and ingots, but only a small quantity of jewellery. It was unusual in being buried in four separate locations; most bronze-age hoards previously excavated have been concentrated in a single location. Some of the items are from continental Europe, demonstrating links with that region. Several proposals have been put forward for the origin of the hoard, which include a collection of goods for recycling, an attempt by a single individual to control the bronze trade in the area or the large-scale abandonment of bronze goods at the start of the Iron Age. The artefacts are currently on exhibition at the Museum of London Docklands, after which they will be on display at the Havering Museum in Romford.

== Discovery ==
The Havering hoard was found in 2018 during archaeological investigation works at a site north of the River Thames in Rainham, London Borough of Havering, that was to be developed for gravel extraction. The site had been identified as a possible bronze-age enclosure site since the 1960s, when aerial photography revealed crop marks that indicated the presence of earthworks. The surrounding area is known to be rich in bronze-age artefacts. The planning conditions associated with the consent granted by Havering Borough Council to the quarry company included a requirement for an archaeological survey of the site. This requirement had been included at the suggestion of Historic England's Greater London Archaeology Advisory Service, whose initial fieldwork had found the site had high archaeological potential. The quarry company commissioned Archaeological Solutions Ltd to carry out the investigation.

The hoard was discovered on a Friday afternoon as the site was closing for the weekend. The discovery was made by 21-year-old archaeologist Harry Platts, who had started with the company just four weeks before on a temporary 6-week contract. He uncovered an axe head and, after working overtime into the evening, the team located further objects buried together in a pit a couple of metres wide. The discovery was ruled to be treasure by the coroner. After leaving the company Platts went on to study for a master's degree in archaeology at the University of York.

== Contents ==
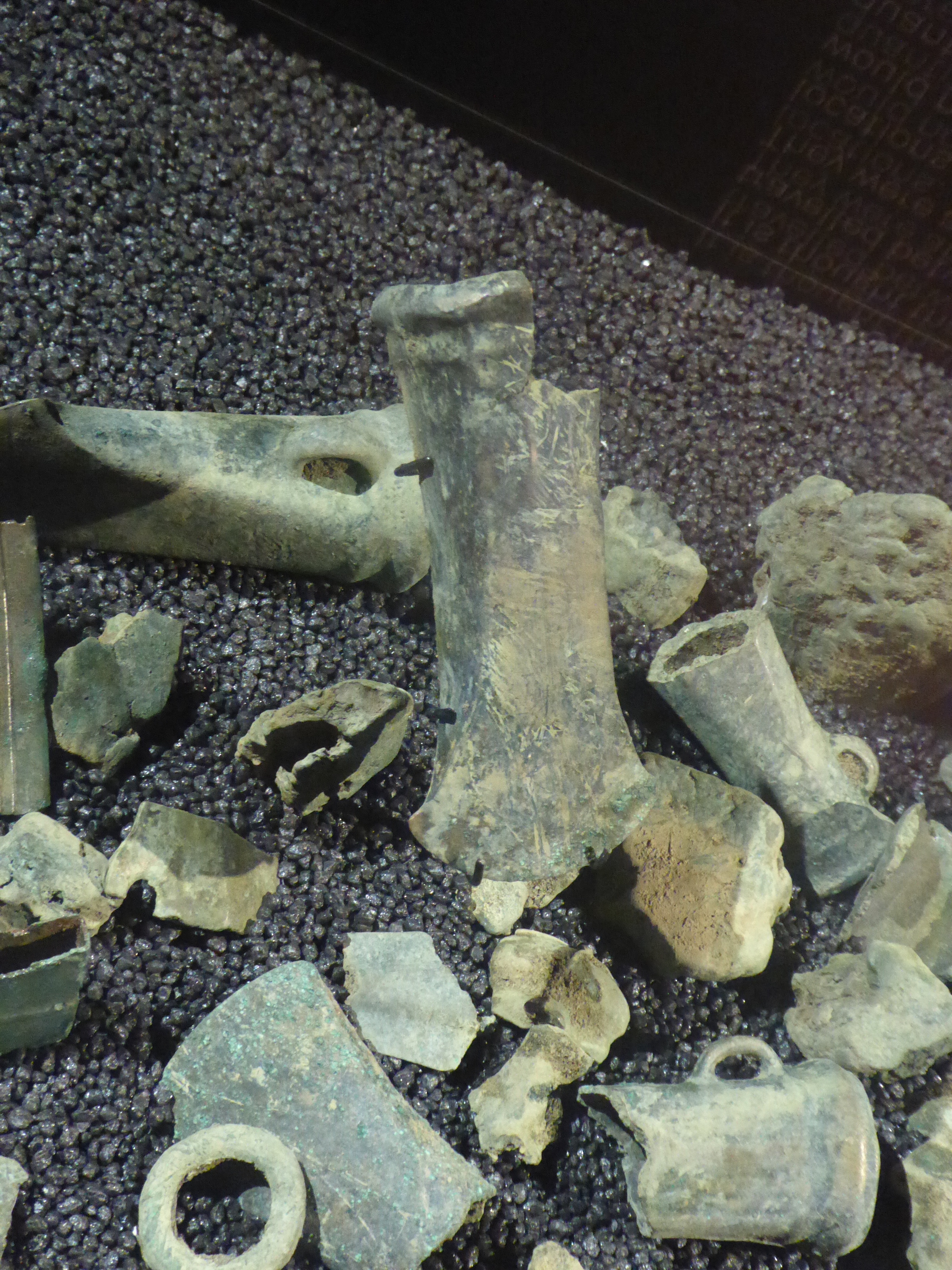
Havering bronze-age hoard 3

The Havering hoard was found at four locations (hoards 1 to 4) within a large enclosure ditch. It is believed that the 453 separate objects in the hoard had been deliberately placed at these locations. The hoard weighed 45 kilograms (99 lb) in total and included swords, socketed axe heads, spear heads, knives, daggers, woodwork tools, metalworking tools, ingots, and other items. There was also a pair of terret rings, used to prevent the reins from tangling on bronze-age carts, which have previously only been found in France. Apart from a small number of bracelets, one of which was determined to have come from north-western France, there was relatively little jewellery. Some of the axes are from continental Europe and the copper ingots are possibly from the Alps. These finds indicate the area had extensive links to the Continent during the Bronze Age.

The hoard proved to be the largest bronze-age hoard to be found in London and the third-largest in the whole of the United Kingdom. The finds were dated from 900 to 800 BCE and almost all of the weapons found had been broken or damaged. Researchers noted that it was unusual to find distinct collections within the same hoard; most hoards are isolated concentrations of finds. Several theories have been proposed as to the origin of the hoard. Some researchers propose that it is a religious offering, others suggest that it was a site where bronze materials were collected for recycling by a metal worker. Another proposal is that it was the temporary stash of a travelling metal worker, who did not wish to carry heavy goods with him. It may also represent a large-scale abandonment of bronze tools at a time when they were being replaced by iron versions or else an attempt by a powerful individual to control the trade in bronze. It is not known why the hoard was not recovered in the Bronze Age.

== Exhibition ==
The finds were due to be exhibited for the first time in April 2020 at the Museum of London Docklands. The COVID-19 pandemic intervened and the museum remained closed from late March until 6 August 2020. Once the exhibition ends the finds will be put on display in the local Havering Museum in Romford.
