= Horsehope Craig Hoard =

Bronze Age hoard found in Scotland 1864

Location of the hoard's discovery

The Horsehope or Horse Hope Craig Hoard is a Bronze Age hoard found in Scotland in 1864.

== Discovery ==
The hoard was discovered in 1864 by a shepherd, under a stone in scree, on Horse Hope Craig, a hill rising to the east of Manor Water, south of Peebles. The local farmer, Mr Linton of Glenrath, investigated the nearby area but found no more objects.

== Artifacts ==
The objects are thought to be fittings from a cart and horse harness, and to date from the 7th and 6th centuries BC. Fifteen bronze rings, a bronze rapier and other bronze objects were given to Peebles Museum, now the Tweeddale Museum and Gallery, and a socketed axe was placed in the then National Museum of Antiquities of Scotland, described as "Socketed axe, smooth, green, trimmed, blade hammered, haft ribs. Length 82 mm [3.2 in], mouth 25 mm × 28 mm [0.98 in × 1.10 in], cutting edge 50 mm [2.0 in], weight 215 g [7.6 oz]".

== Similar hoards ==
When a Bronze Age hoard (working name: Peebles Hoard) was discovered in June 2020 near Peebles, The Scotsman stated that "Only one type of similar hoard is known from Scotland, which was found at Horsehope Craig, Peeblesshire."

== See also ==
- Peebles Hoard
- List of Bronze Age hoards in Great Britain
