= Peebles Hoard =

Bronze Age hoard found in Scotland in 2020

The hoard was found near Peebles, Peeblesshire, Scotland

The Peebles hoard is a Bronze Age hoard which was found near Peebles, Peeblesshire, Scotland in June 2020. It was discovered by Mariusz Stepien, a 44-year-old hobby metal detectorist, and the find was announced on 10 August 2020.

== Discovery ==
The hoard was discovered on 21 June 2020 by Mariusz Stepien, a 44-year-old metal detectorist, originally from Poland but resident in Edinburgh, who had been metal-detecting for nine years. He was detecting with friends in a field near Peebles, Peeblesshire, when he found the first item at around 10am, 60 centimetres (24 in) below ground level. He immediately reported it to the Treasure Trove Unit and National Museums Scotland. The site was covered with a tent until the professionals arrived. There followed 22 days' work on site, during which Stepien and his friends camped in the field to protect the site and to observe the archaeologists' work, and the finds and surrounding soil were taken to the National Museums Collection Centre in Edinburgh. The find was announced on 10 August 2020.

In November 2025, National Museums Scotland announced that their conservation work had revealed some silver-coloured objects among the 500 objects in the hoard. Silver was unknown at this time, and analysis at Edinburgh's National Museums Collection Centre determined that the metallic surface colour was caused by high levels of tin. Experts believe that Bronze Age artisans deliberately applied a complex enrichment process to achieve this effect.

== Description ==
An in-situ Bronze Age hoard:

- Complete harness – with bronze fastenings, and organic traces of leather sufficiently detailed to reveal the tooling
- Rattle pendant
- Sword in scabbard – dated 1000 BC to 900 BC

== Significance ==
Professional archaeologists were contacted before the site had been disturbed, allowing the items to be investigated in context and details of the leatherwork to be recorded. Bronze Age findings are rare in Scotland, and the artefacts establish a linkage between the people living there 3,000 years ago and tribes in Northern Germany.

== See also ==
- Horsehope Craig Hoard, found at Manor Water, south of Peebles in 1864
- Dowris Hoard, found at Dowris, County Offaly, Ireland in 1820s
- Mooghaun North Hoard, found at Mooghaun North, County Clare, Ireland in 1854
