= Charmian Woodfield =

British archaeologist

Charmian Catherine Woodfield FSA
- Born: Charmian Catherine Phillips; 1929; Leicester, England
- Died: 2014 (aged 84–85); Milton Keynes
- Occupation: Archaeologist
- Spouse: Paul Woodfield

Charmian Catherine Woodfield FSA (née Phillips; 1929–2014) was a British archaeologist.

== Career ==
Charmian started worked for the Ministry of Works as a field archaeologist. She excavated many sites, including Verulamium (St Albans) with Sheppard Frere and Whitefriars, Coventry. Her publication record included excavation reports and monographs, specialist pottery reports, and reports of other finds, mainly focused on sites around Northamptonshire, Buckinghamshire, and the Midlands. Following her death, archaeologist David Breeze commented that Charmian had "set a new standard" for the level of reporting and recording of Hadrian's Wall after her 1965 publication of six excavations of Turrets in that region.

Excavations carried out in the 1960s on the site of the Carmelite Friary at Coventry, England, by Charmain, revealed the lost church, of unexpected size and splendour, adjoining the standing cloister E range. It was founded in 1342 by Sir John Poulteney, a pre-eminent merchant and Draper, and Lord Mayor of London. The report by Charmain includes the first detailed examination of the standing E claustral range by the Royal Commission on Historic Monuments, probably the finest medieval friary claustral range to survive in N Europe. This is augmented by historical illustrations, many published for the first time in this report. There is also a study of the exceptionally fine surviving choir stalls, with the arms of several later London mayors, which originally seated up to 90 friars. These were set above acoustic chambers in the choir to amplify their singing. Only three other sets of friary choir stalls are known to exist in Britain. An attempt is made to reconstruct the appearance of the friary in its 10-acre (c.4ha) precinct in the 15th century, including the highly unusual architectural expression of the chapter house, the reredorter and the gate houses. Comparative plans of other Carmelite houses in Britain and Europe are illustrated for comparison, some for the first time.

Woodfield was involved in the discovery and excavation of the Milton Keynes Hoard in 2000.

She was elected as a fellow of the Society of Antiquaries of London on 27 November 1986.

== Personal life ==
Charmian had a twin brother, Nicholas. She first met her husband, the architect Paul Woodfield, during excavations at Verulamium and they worked together on many subsequent projects.

== Selected publications ==
- Woodfield, C. C. (1972). "Six Turrets on Hadrian's Wall". Archaeologia Aeliana. 4th Series. 43: 87–200. doi:10.2307/526026. JSTOR 526026. S2CID 147048379.
- Woodfield, C. 1980. "A Roman military site at Magiovinium?" Records of Buckinghamshire 20, 384–399.
- Woodfield, C. and Woodfield, P. 1981–2. "The Palace of the Bishops of Lincoln at Lyddington", Transactions of the Leicestershire Archaeological and Historical Society 57
- Woodfield, C. 2005. "The Church of Our Lady of Mount Carmel and some conventual buildings at Whitefriars, Coventry". BAR British Series 389
- Woodfield, C. 2006. "Rare tazze, paterae and a broad hint at lararium from Lactodorum (Towcester), Journal of Roman Pottery Studies 12
- Woodfield, C, (July – August 2007). "The White Friars of Coventry". Current Archaeology. 18, No.6 (210): 9–16.
