= Sussex loop =

Bronze archeological objects

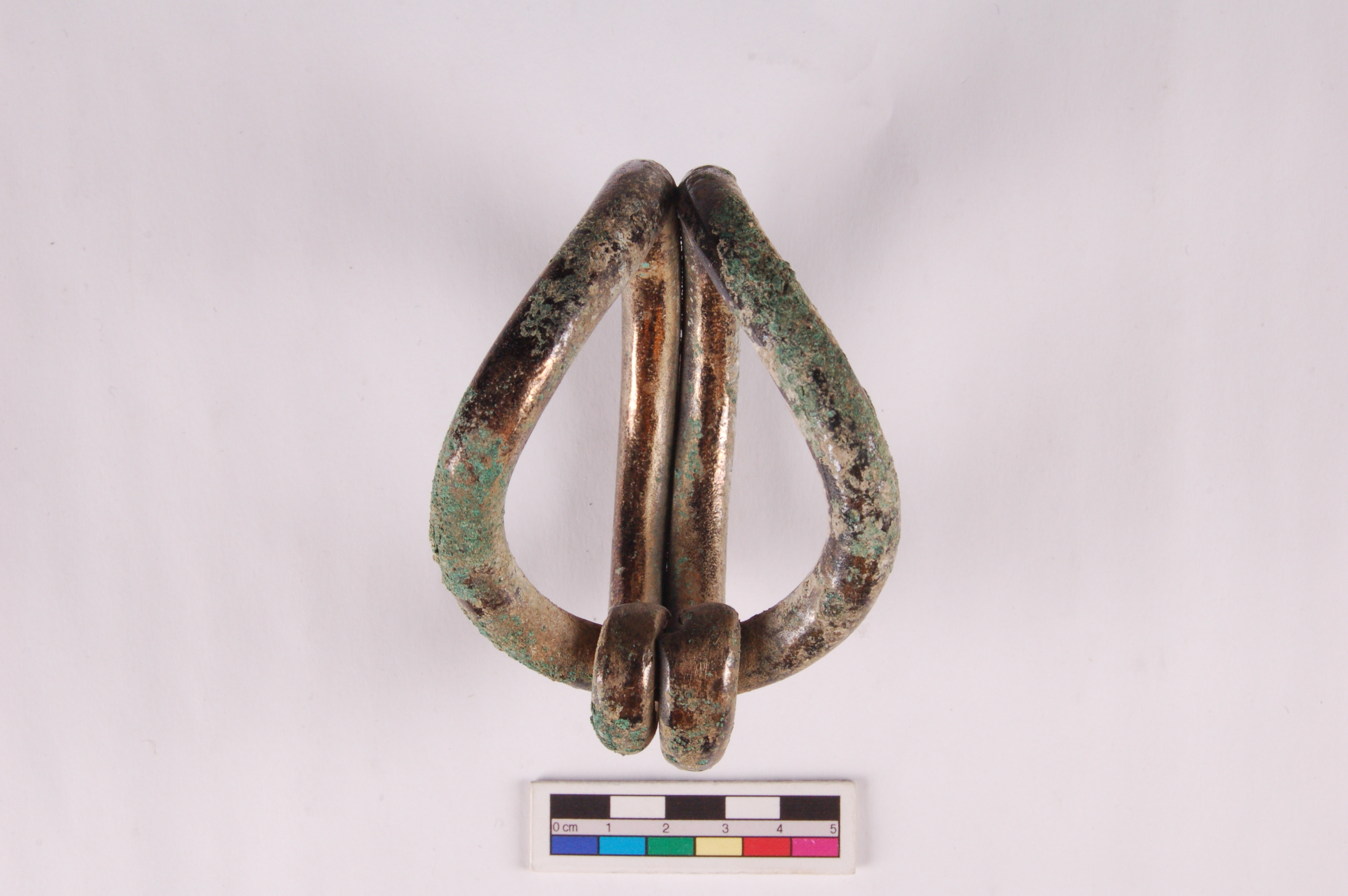
A Sussex loop at The Barbican House Museum

Sussex loop refer to a form of bronze objects found in South Downs/Weald area of England.

== Description ==
The loops are created from a thick rod of bronze that is bent in half to form a loop at one end. The rod is then shaped into a circle, with the ends of the rod curled and hooked back into the loop.

== Origin ==
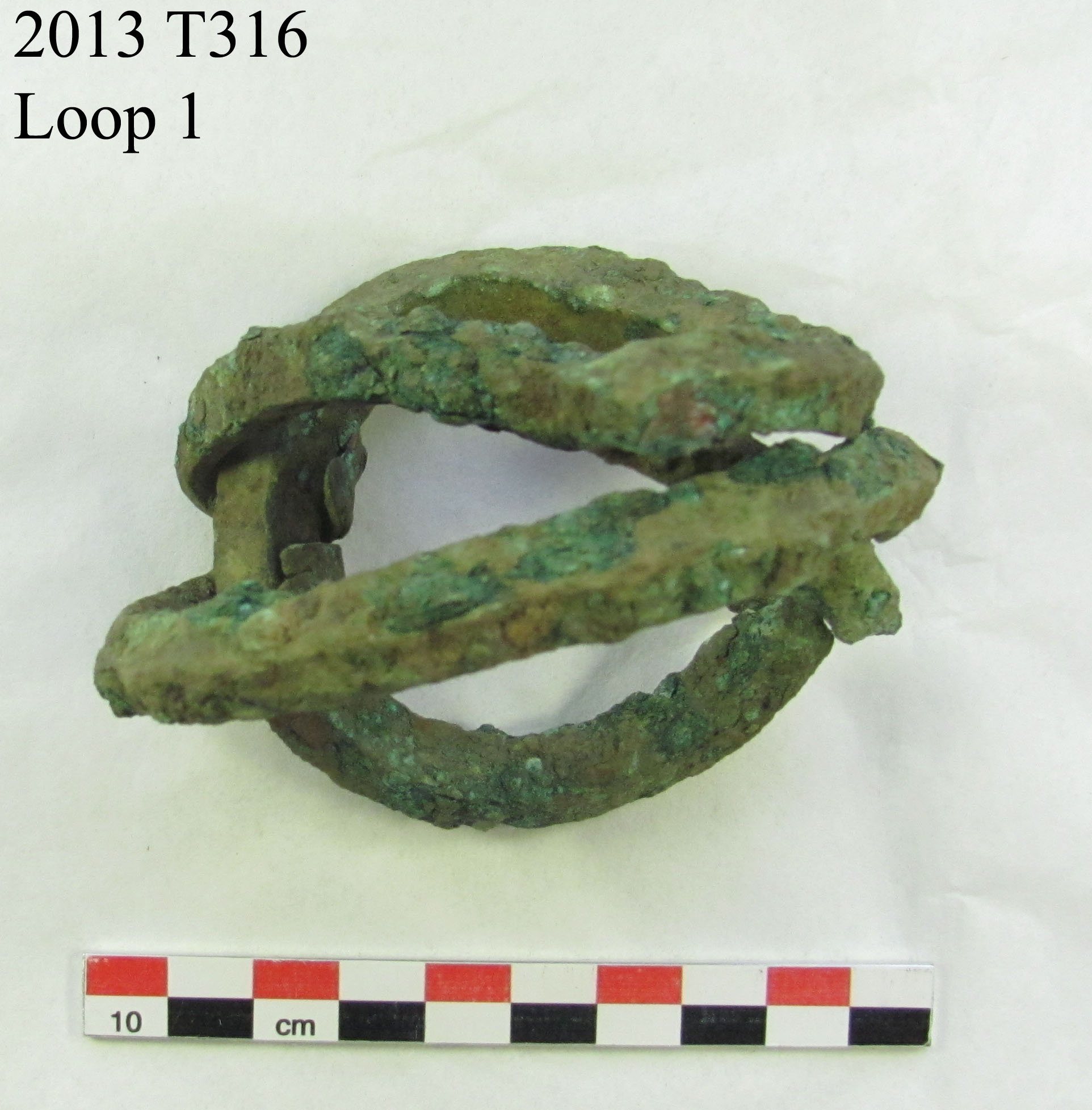
A Middle Bronze Age hoard discovered on the 17th of May 2013 in the course of building work. The find consists of ten copper alloy objects, six palstave axes, two spiral finger rings and two 'Sussex Loop' armlets.

The first four loops were found at Hollingbury Camp (a hill-fort on the northern edge of Brighton, in East Sussex) in 1825. The name of the object is derived from their shape and area of discovery. Five were found in the Near Lewes hoard in 2011. The rest had been discovered within Sussex. In May 2013, two loops were discovered outside Sussex.

== Purpose ==
The purpose of the loops remain unclear to archaeologists. Some suggest it may have been for adornments or for a ritual.
