= Heights of Brae Hoard =

Software engineer

The Heights of Brae hoard is a group of at least eleven Bronze Age gold ornaments, currently held in the National Museum of Scotland. Gold bracelets, 'cup-ended ornaments' and a corrugated gold band were discovered through ploughing, and later excavation, in a field in the Highland region in Scotland. The objects date to the Late Bronze Age in Britain, around 950-750 BC, and represent the largest hoard of Bronze Age gold objects from Scotland.

== Discovery ==
In the 1960s, several gold objects were ploughed up in a field at the Heights of Brae, near Dingwall, Highland. Two of these were reported to the National Museum of Antiquities of Scotland in 1979 and the area was excavated by D.V. Clarke and M.M.B. Kemp. At least two objects are known to have been lost prior to excavation, as they were considered to be horse brasses and were subsequently discard, though nine objects still survive. Excavation revealed no obvious feature from which the hoard was recovered and the excavators concluded that the objects probably originally comprised a hoard of at least eleven objects that was scattered by the plough. The nine surviving objects were reported to the Treasure Trove Unit in Scotland and acquired by the National Museum of Scotland.

== The objects ==
The objects were all produced from gold and the surviving objects include five penannular armrings or bracelets, three 'cup-ended ornaments' or 'dress fasteners', and a corrugated gold band. These objects have been interpreted as ornaments, though the exact function of the cup-ended ornaments (sometimes called 'dress fasteners') is unclear. Several of the objects are unfinished, suggesting they may have been produced locally, or by a travelling metalworker. Similar examples of cup-ended ornaments and bracelets are well-known in Scotland and share parallels in Ireland.

== Modern history ==
The objects are currently on display in the Early People gallery at the National Museum of Scotland on Chambers Street, Edinburgh.

== External links section ==
- Historic Environment Record
- Canmore record
- Heights of Brae hoard - NMS Scan record
