= Havering Museum =

Local museum in Romford, London, England

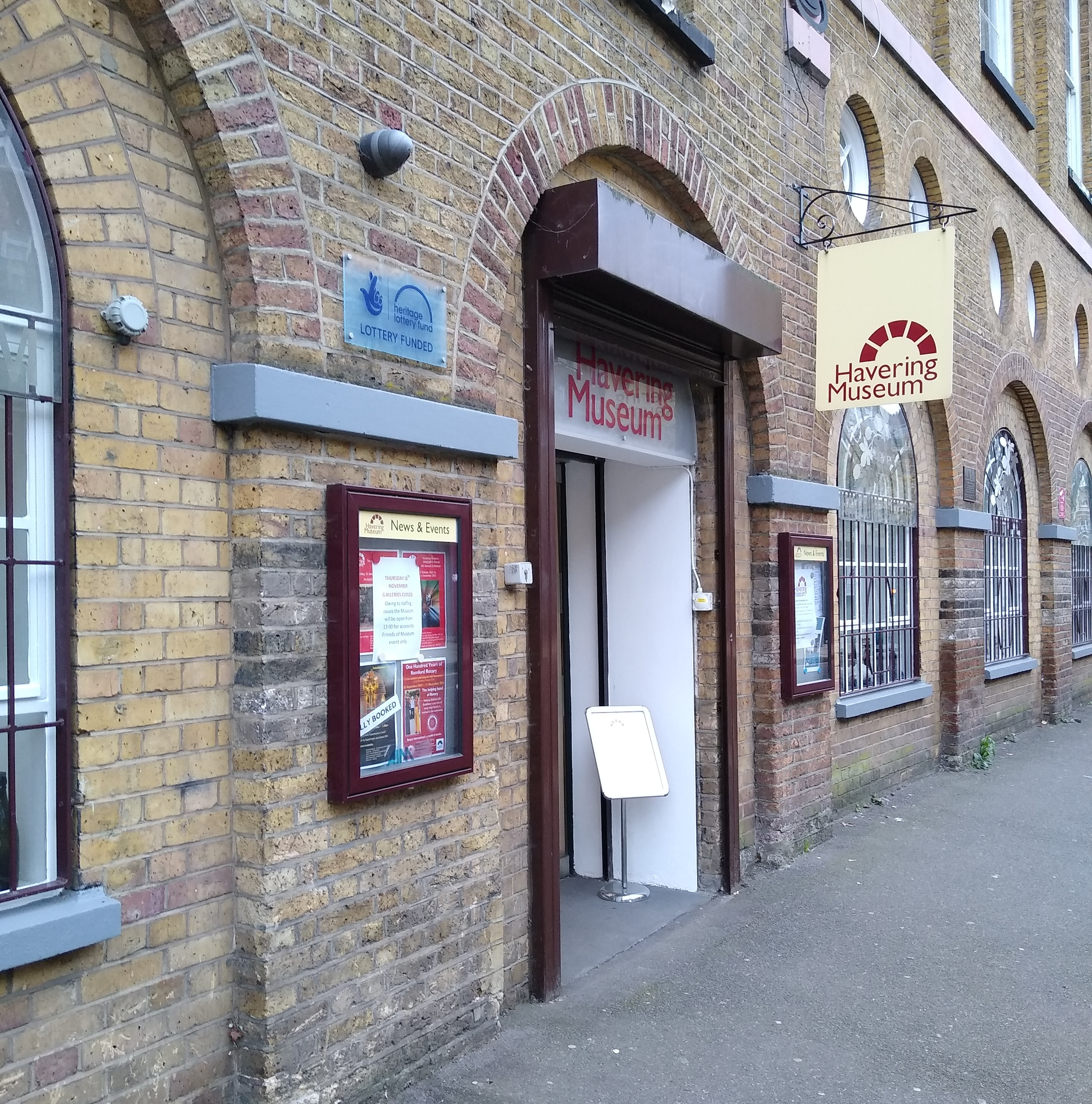

- Exterior Image of Museum built into the facade of the Ind Coope Brewery
- Established: 26 May 2010; 16 years ago
- Location: High Street, Romford
- Coordinates: 51.5776°N 0.1788°E
- Public transit access: Romford
- Website: haveringmuseum.org.uk

Havering Museum is a local museum located in the town of Romford, in the London Borough of Havering. It is primarily focused on the studies and artifacts from the five towns that encompass the borough of Havering. Located in what remains of the old Ind Coope Romford Brewery, it is one of the last reminders of Romford's brewing history. Completely volunteer run, the museum is self-funded.

== History ==
The museum started out as the thought of local historian Ian Wilkes who in 2000 formed Friends Of Havering Museum, the hard work and determination of local people in 2008 grew partnership with the London Borough of Havering the project received a Heritage Lottery Fund grant, opening in May 2010.

There are separate displays for five localities in the borough:

- Havering-atte-Bower
- Hornchurch
- Romford
- Rainham
- Upminster

== Staffing ==
The museum is made up of core team of 30 volunteers who work across a variety of areas including, Collections, Education, Front of House and Administration and interns who help with the day-to-day running of the building and assist with special projects.

== Facilities ==
The museum has two rooms at either end of the building the Learning Zone and The Exhibition Room available for various schools and organisations in the community. Havering Museum also comes with a shop.
