= Palstave =

European Bronze Age axe

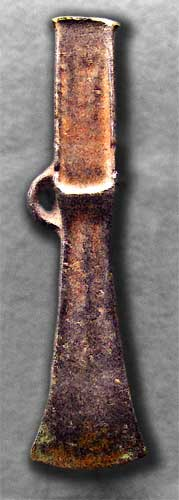
A palstave with an additional loop.

A palstave is a type of early bronze axe. It was common in the middle Bronze Age in northern, western and south-western Europe. In the technical sense, although precise definitions differ, an axe is generally deemed to be a palstave if it is hafted by means of a forked wooden handle kept in place with high, cast flanges and stop bar. The axe should be much thicker on the blade side of the stop bar than the hafting side (Schmidt and Burgess 1981, p. 115). In these respects, it is very close, but distinct from, earlier 'flanged axes'. Palstaves were cast in bivalve moulds made of clay, stone or bronze.

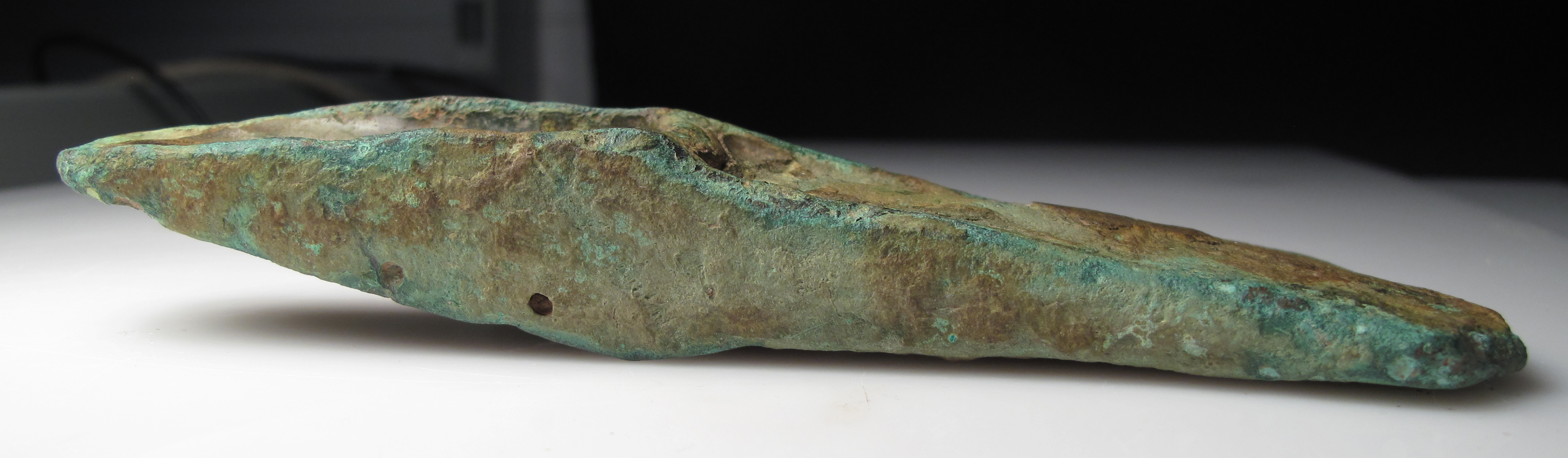
A middle Bronze Age palstave

The archaeologist John Evans (1881, p. 72) popularized the term 'palstave' in English following Danish archaeologists who borrowed the term from Icelandic: paalstab. Confusingly, a paalstab is not an axe, but a digging tool. However, the term had become so common with Scandinavian and German archaeologists that Evans thought it best to follow suit.

== See also ==
- Celt (tool)
