= Empress pepper pot =

Spice container from the Hoxne hoard

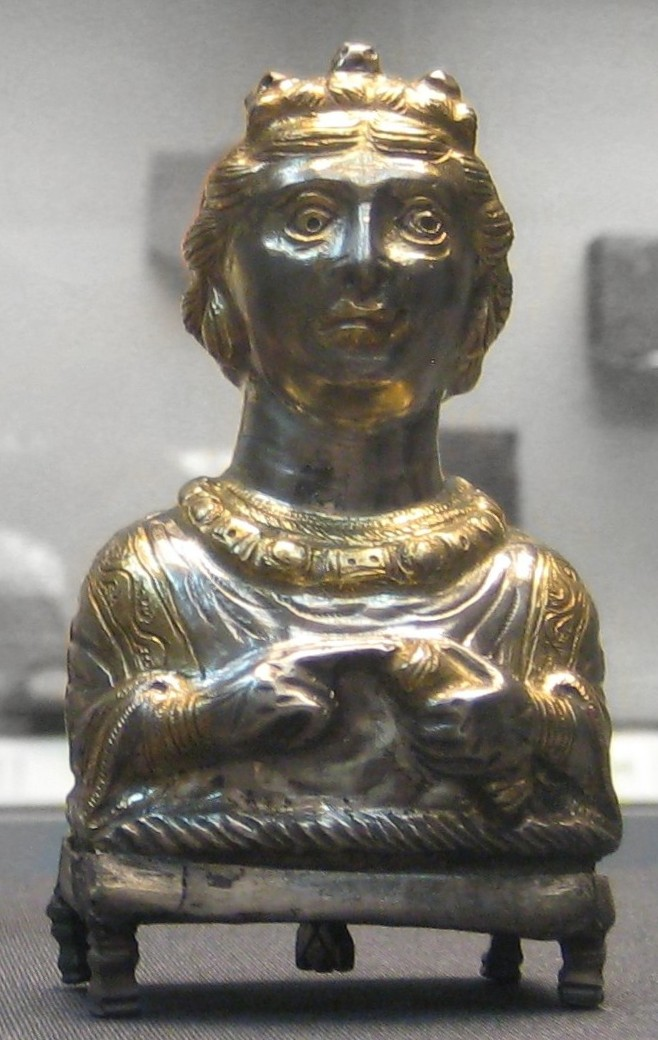
- The "Empress" Pepper Pot from the Hoxne Hoard on display in the British Museum
- Material: Silver (gilt)
- Size: Height:103 mm (4.1 in); Diameter:33 mm (1.3 in); Weight:107.9 g
- Created: 4th Century A.D.
- Period/culture: Roman
- Place: Hoxne, Suffolk
- Present location: Room 49, British Museum, London
- Registration: 1994,4-8 33

The Hoxne hoard pepper pot, commonly known as the Empress pepper pot, although it now seems not to represent an empress, is a silver piperatorium, partially gilded, dating from around 400 AD. It was found as part of the Hoxne Hoard in Hoxne, Suffolk, in November 1992, and is now in the British Museum, where it is normally on display. It is a hollow silver statuette of the top half of a woman's body, with a mechanism to allow ground pepper or spices to be loaded into its base and then shaken out. The mechanism does not grind the pepper and has a rotatable disc with three positions. One position allows filling, another has fine holes to allow ground pepper out and another allows the pot to be closed. The pot was chosen as part of the 2010 BBC Radio 4 series, A History of the World in 100 Objects, as item 40.

== Pepper pots in Roman archaeology ==
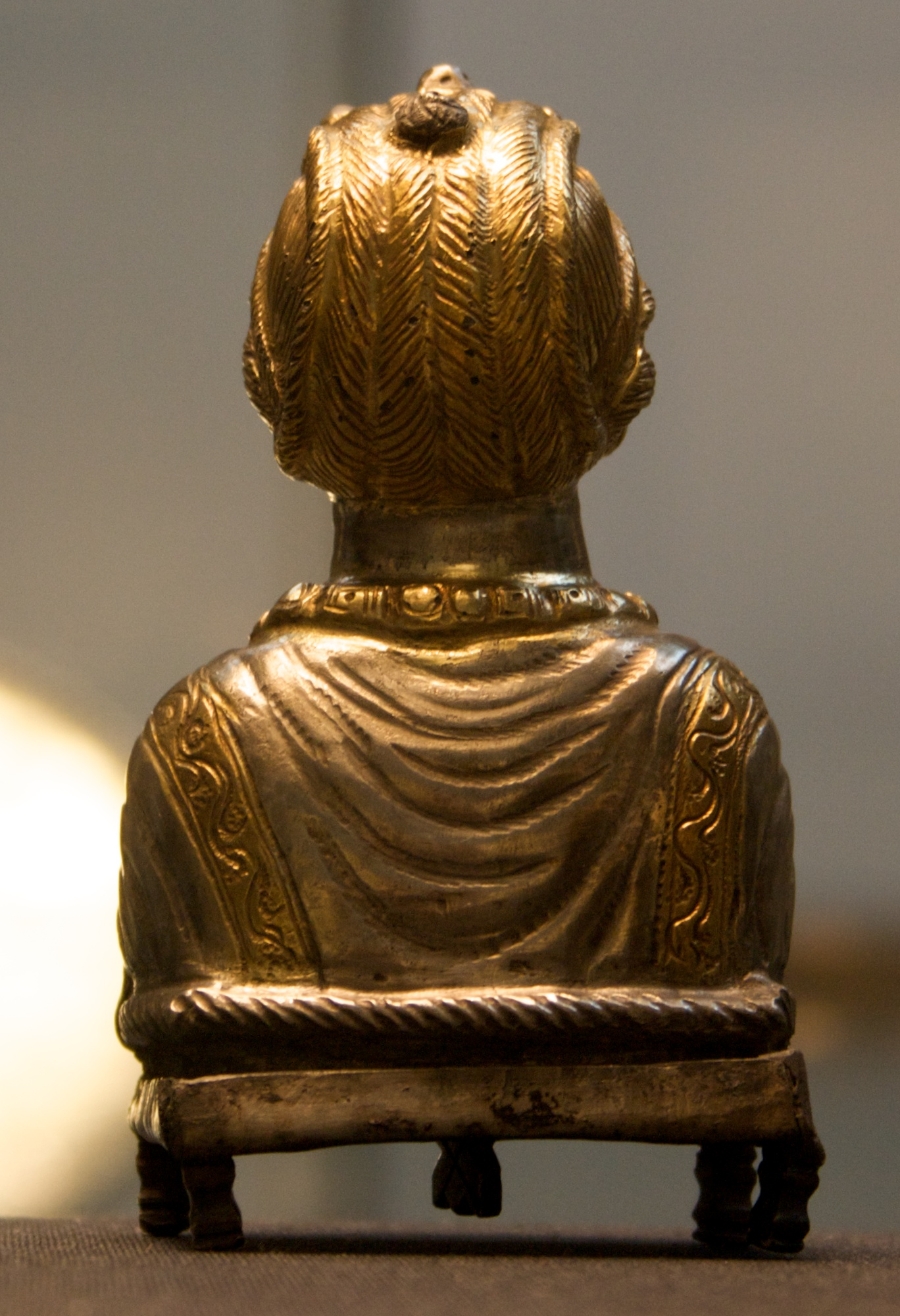
The back view of the pepper pot

Piperatoria are unusual in Roman archaeology. Four, including the Empress, were found in the Hoxne Hoard in England. These pepperpots are thought to have contained pepper or some other expensive spice. The evidence for pepper in particular has been drawn from mineralised black pepper that was found at three sites in the 1990s and from the Vindolanda tablets, which record the purchase of it for two denarii near Hadrian's Wall. Other sites have revealed food flavourings such as coriander, poppyseed, celery, dill, summer savoury, mustard, and fennel. The existence of yet other flavourings are known from translations of surviving recipes.

Two 'pepper casters' were found at the House of Menander in Pompeii but these are ill-suited to setting upon a table, leading to suggestions that they were in fact used to sample wine rather than distribute pepper. The only items which are unquestionably Roman piperatoria are all dated after 250 AD; they have been found at a number of locations: at Place Camille-Jouffres in Vienne, France; among the Chaourse Treasure in the Aisne département, France; at Nicolaevo in Bulgaria; and one of uncertain provenance, thought to be from Sidon.

== Name ==
The pepper pot resembles a design used for some steelyard balance weights from a later period in the Eastern Roman Empire. At the time of the discovery of the Hoxne Hoard these steelyard weights were thought to represent an empress and so the name was also used for the pot. However, subsequent thinking on the bronze weights has moved to the view that the design is not intended to depict an empress, or indeed any of the Roman goddesses. The figures are depicted holding a scroll, signifying education and affluence, but lack the diadems associated with an empress. Detailed work on the pot independently suggests that "lady" would be a more appropriate label. Nevertheless, as the pepper pot had already received widespread publicity by this point, the title is retained, though used advisedly.

Preceded by 39: Admonitions Scroll	A History of the World in 100 Objects; Object 40	Succeeded by 41: Seated Buddha from Gandhara
