= Thetford Hoard =

Hoard of Romano-British metalwork

Coordinates: 52°24′N 0°44′E

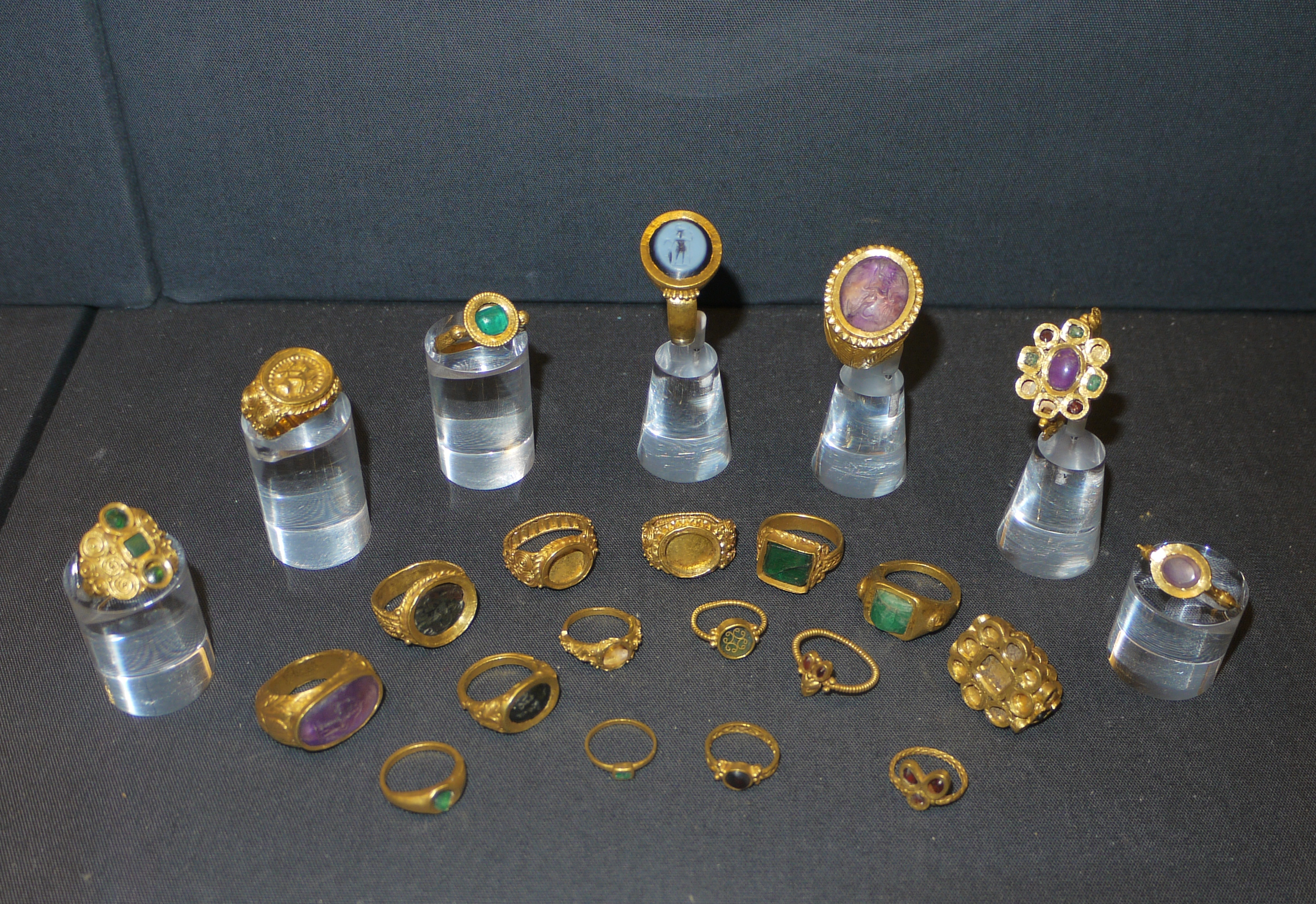
- 22 finger rings from the Thetford Hoard
- Material: gold, silver, gems, shale
- Size: 33 silver spoons 3 silver strainers 22 gold finger rings 4 gold bracelets 4 necklace pendants 5 gold chain necklaces 2 pairs of necklace-clasps 1 gold amulet 1 unmounted engraved gem 1 emerald bead 3 glass beads 1 gold belt-buckle 1 shale cylindrical box
- Period/culture: Romano-British
- Discovered: Gallows Hill, near Thetford, Norfolk, November 1979
- Present location: British Museum
- Identification: P&E 1981 0201 1-83

The Thetford Hoard (also known as the Thetford Treasure) is a hoard of Romano-British metalwork found by Arthur and Greta Brooks at Gallows Hill, near Thetford in Norfolk, England, in November 1979, and now in the British Museum. Dating from the mid- to late-4th century AD, this hoard is a collection of thirty-three silver spoons and three silver strainers, twenty-two gold finger rings, four gold bracelets, four necklace pendants, five gold chain necklaces and two pairs of necklace-clasps, a gold amulet designed as a pendant, an unmounted engraved gem, four beads (one emerald and three of glass), and a gold belt-buckle decorated with a dancing satyr. A small cylindrical lidded box made from shale also belonged to the hoard.

== Discovery ==
The find was made under very unfortunate circumstances. The finder was metal-detecting without the knowledge and permission of the owners of the site, which had recently been cleared for building work, and made his discovery late on a November day, in failing light. He recovered the material in great haste, probably overlooking some small items, and because he knew he had no legal right to search in that area, he did not, as the law requires, report his discovery to the authorities. Instead, he unwisely attempted to sell the objects he had found to private buyers. By the time archaeologists learned of the find several months later, the findspot had been built over, making proper archaeological investigation impossible. It was not even possible to question the finder about the circumstances, because by the time the material arrived at the British Museum for study, he was terminally ill, and he died about a month later, in July 1980. Persistent rumours that the treasure originally included coins have never been confirmed or convincingly rejected, but even if there were no coins, it is quite likely that the group as we see it now is incomplete. The full account of the circumstances of the discovery is related in the standard catalogue. This lack of information makes it particularly difficult to speculate on the nature of the hoard and the purpose of its concealment in antiquity.

== Silver objects ==
The silver tableware in the hoard comprises three strainers and 33 spoons, of two types. Seventeen of the spoons are cochlearia, with long tapered handles, and the other sixteen are the larger ligulae or cigni, with bowls about the size of a modern dessert spoon and short, coiled handles ending in birds' heads. Many of the spoons bear pagan inscriptions to Faunus, a minor Roman god who had many characteristics in common with the Greek Pan. There is no overtly Christian symbolism in the hoard, though one spoon is decorated with the figure of a fish, which can often be an oblique reference to Christianity. Bacchic iconography is obvious in the group, and was traditional in Roman culture, but in the late Roman period, many Bacchic motifs were adopted and given new interpretations by Christians. Nevertheless, at this date, the end of the 4th century AD, there was no obstacle to placing unequivocally Christian symbols and inscriptions on personal possessions, so that their absence here is noteworthy. The openly, and probably exclusively, pagan iconography remains one of the most interesting and unusual aspects of the assemblage.

The dedications, such as DEIFAVNIAVSECI (RIB 2420.21) (literally, 'of the God Faunus Ausecus') are engraved in the bowls of both the cochlearia and cigni. The epithets or by-names applied to Faunus in the inscriptions have been identified as containing Celtic (Gaulish or British) linguistic elements, supporting the supposition that any cult of Faunus which they represent was Romano-British, not one that consisted of devotees from elsewhere in the Roman Empire. The inscriptions were discussed in the published catalogue by the late Kenneth Jackson.

It has been suggested that it is unlikely that these items were intended to be used for ordinary domestic dining, and that their eventual deposition may be interpreted as a ritual act rather than a practical one (See Religion in Ancient Rome). However, since both pagan and Christian inscriptions are regularly found on Roman jewellery and domestic tableware, and as the actual motivation for the concealment of the Thetford material itself is unknown, this view is open to debate. The unusual composition of the group of gold objects is actually somewhat better evidence of a non-domestic background than the decoration and inscriptions of the silver assemblage (see comments on the range of finger-rings in the following section). The suspicion that the hoard is incomplete undermines any detailed analysis of these matters, but if the gold and silver objects were connected in any way with pagan cult practices, which is certainly a possibility, then the anti-pagan Theodosian edicts of the 390s would have provided good practical (rather than ritual) reasons for the concealment of the material from the authorities.

== Gold jewellery ==
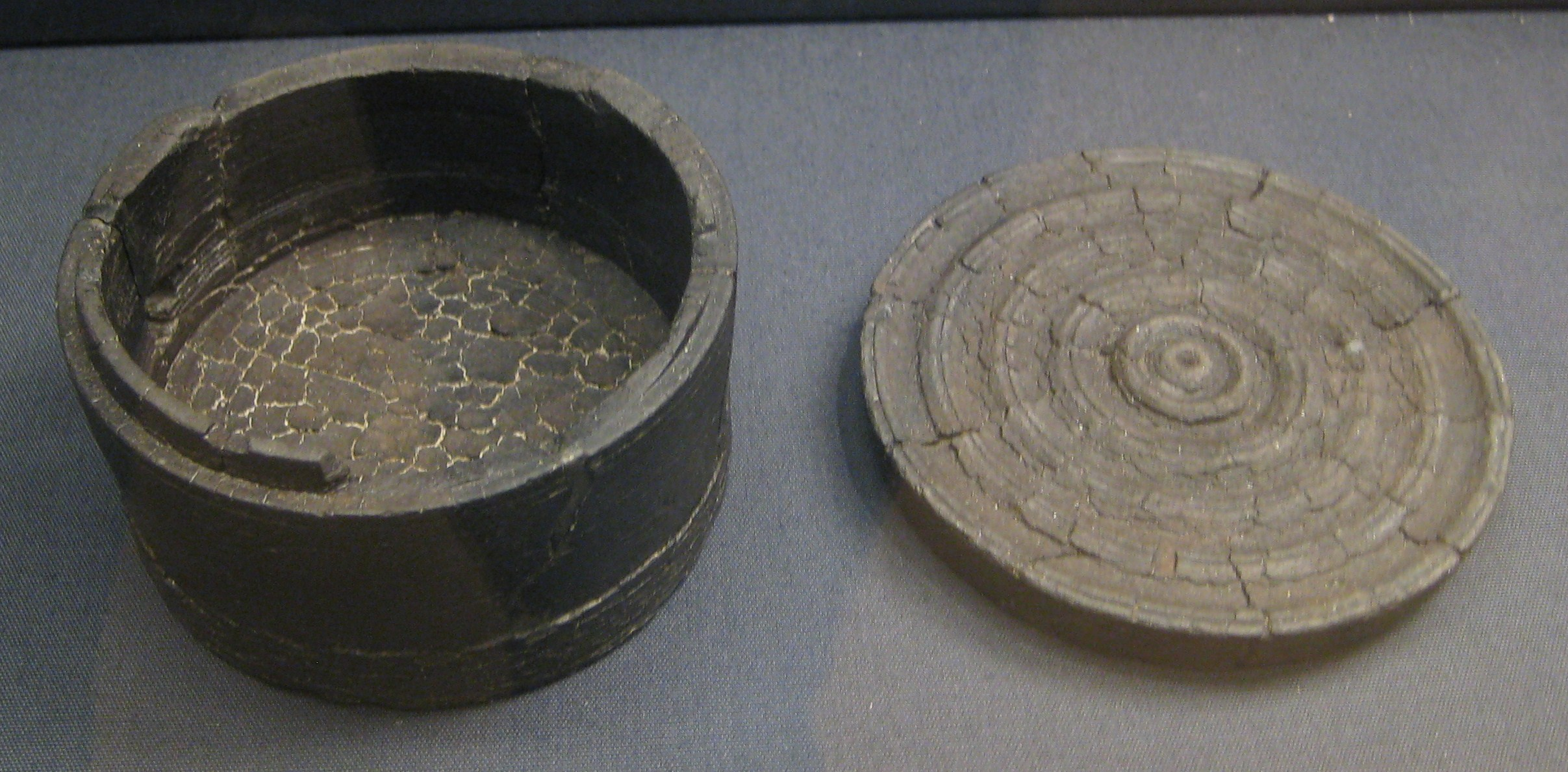
Shale box, part of the hoard, probably containing the smaller items.

The gold belt-buckle is an unusual find, and would have been worn by a man; we know that belts decorated in various forms were important symbols of office or status in late Roman times, though few elements of them have survived. Its decoration, of a satyr carrying a pedum (shepherd's crook) and a bunch of grapes, accords with other hints at Bacchic imagery throughout the assemblage, in both the jewellery and the tableware. For example, the running feline animal on spoon (cochlear) (item 66), originally identified as a panther or leopard, and referred to as the 'panther spoon', is certainly a reference to Bacchus, who was regularly accompanied by a panther or leopard (Panthera pardus), or by a tiger (Panthera tigris). In fact, the animal on Thetford spoon (item 66) is probably a tiger: the rendering of the stripes as very short curved lines, easily mistaken for spots, was common in Roman art.

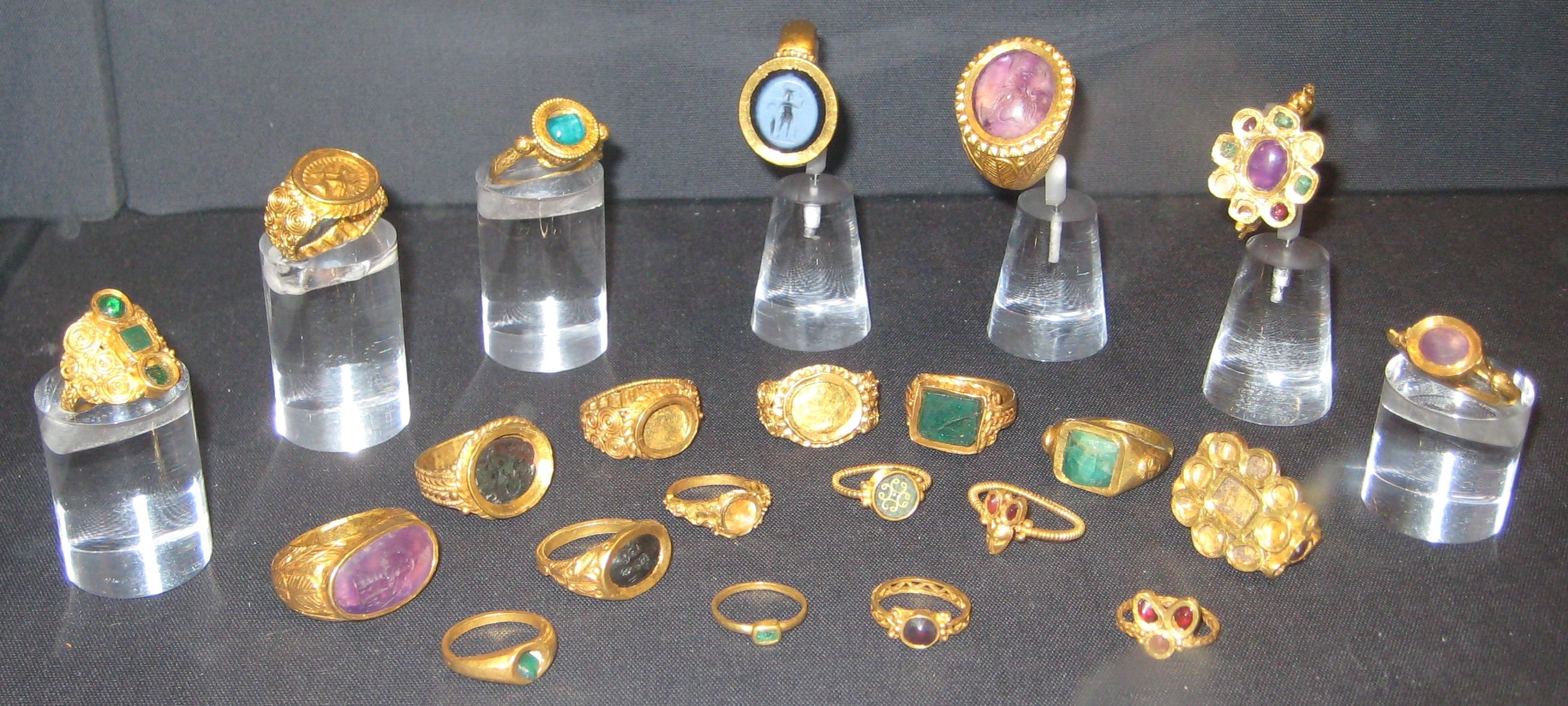
The rings from the hoard

The gold finger-rings could have been worn by either men or women, though the bracelets, and necklaces with pendants were chiefly feminine jewels at this date. Many of the rings display elaborate filigree work, typical of late-Roman taste, and a few are of highly unusual design. The tiny horned, Pan-like head that forms the bezel of ring (item 23) appears to be unparalleled, and may well be intended as a reference to Faunus, while the design of (item 7), two birds flanking a vase, is both a standard Bacchic image, eventually adopted in Christian iconography, and possibly something more specific in this instance. The birds, even though they are at a very small scale, have the appearance of woodpeckers, and picus, the Latin name for birds of this kind, was also the name of the father of Faunus in some sources (Virgil, Aeneid 7, 48).

Much of the jewellery will have been designed and selected for its talismanic, religious or personal significance. A gold amulet pendant, intended for suspension around the neck (and with parallels including one from York), was filled with sulphur, possibly because of its apotropaic qualities. One ring is set with an engraved gem of brown chalcedony 13 × 9.5 mm. Upon it is depicted a cock-headed, snake-legged deity known as an Anguipede, holding a shield which is inscribed in Greek with ΩΑΙ, reversed ΙΑΩ or (iao), a magical word often associated with this deity (see Voces mysticae). Although set in a closed-back setting, this gem was also inscribed on its reverse side with the Greek ΑΒΡΑϹΞϹΑΒΑΩΘ which translates as Abrasax Sabaoth also a word of power and associated name of the deity. It is interesting that a Greek-inscribed charm appears in a hoard primarily associated with an Italian (Latin) minor deity (Faunus), though many other Greek inscriptions are known from Roman Britain, and other examples of late-Antique ‘magical gems’ have also been found in Latin-speaking provinces.

A matching pair of bracelets (items 24 and 25), which at the time of finding and publication could be paralleled only by similar bracelets from the 1841 Lyon jewellery hoard, which is of somewhat earlier date, have now been paralleled by a set of four matching bracelets from the Hoxne hoard found in 1992, the date of which appears to be close to that of the deposition of the Thetford find.

It has been suggested that all the objects "may well have been commissioned by a group of intellectuals who fervently believed in the old values and who interred the objects when serious persecution of non-Christians began in the 390s".

Most of the gold objects appear to be in fresh, apparently unworn condition. Roman gold, which is of high purity (in this case, with a mean gold content of over 94 percent; is soft, and quickly shows signs of use. This pristine condition is one of the unusual features of the Thetford jewellery assemblage. Most of the rings have design and workmanship characteristics in common that suggest they may be the products of a single workshop, while the construction of the matching pair of bracelets is also paralleled in the form of two of the rings (items 10 and 12). It would be somewhat surprising for a single owner, or even a family, to possess such a comparatively large number of rings which seem to have been acquired from a single source at the same time. Personal collections of jewellery usually contain pieces of different ages and conditions.

== Significance ==
The Thetford assemblage, in spite of the sadly inadequate details of its discovery and provenance, remains one of the most intriguing and unusual of the many late-Roman precious-metal hoards from Britain. Although the combination of silver tableware and gold personal ornament (with or without coins) is common enough in precious-metal hoards of this period from Britain, the fact that the inscriptions, supported by the visual imagery, allude to pagan, rather than Christian, belief towards the end of the 4th century, is important. Attempts have been made to interpret the hoard as Christian, but remain somewhat unconvincing when applied to objects current at a period when paganism, rather than Christianity, was out of favour.

== See also ==
- Votive offering
- Hoxne Hoard
- Religion in Ancient Rome
- List of hoards in Britain
