= Hoxne Hoard =

Roman hoard found in England

Coordinates: 52°20′33″N 01°11′15″E

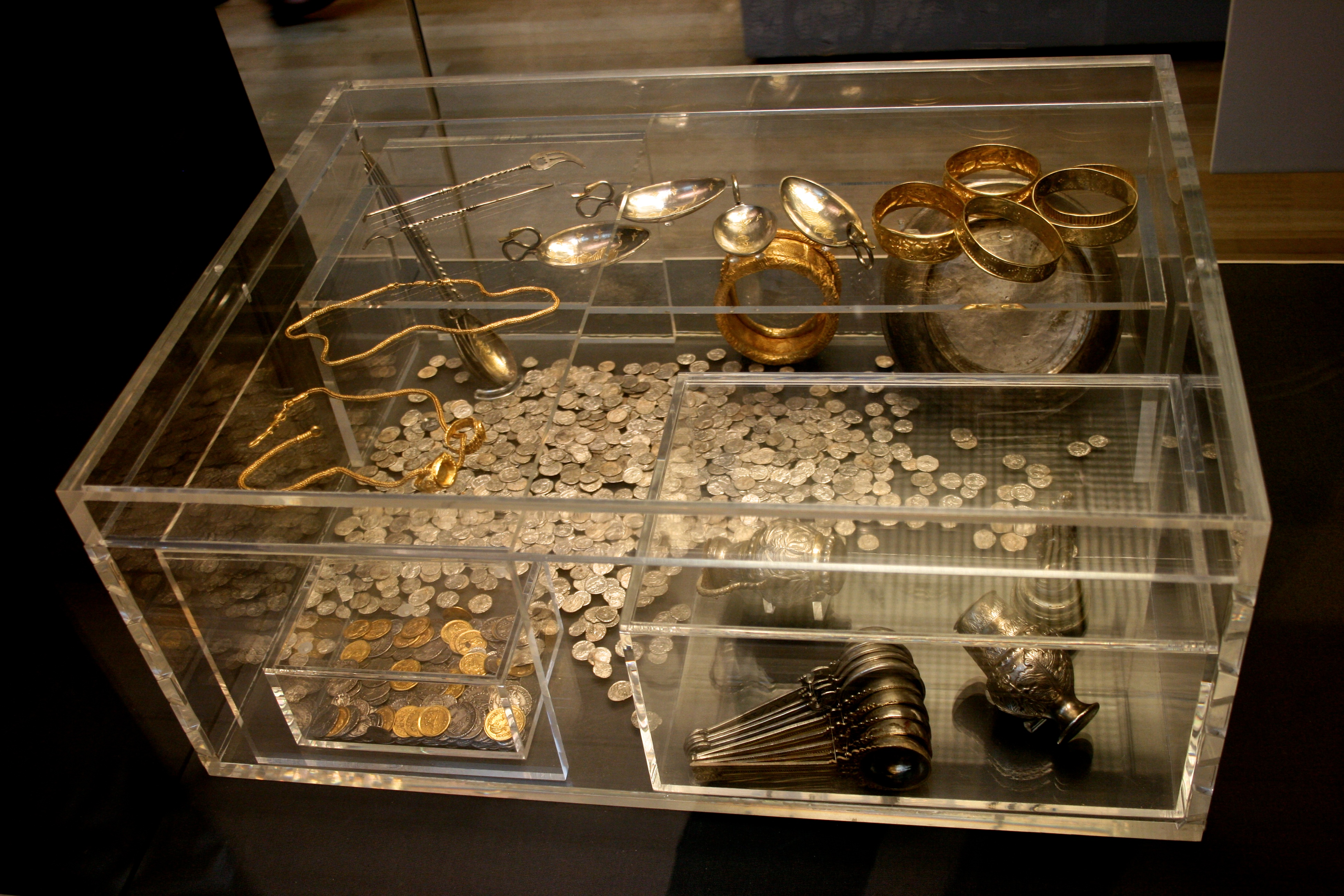
- Display case reconstructing the arrangement of the hoard treasure when excavated.
- Material: Gold, silver, bronze, iron, and organic material
- Created: 4th or 5th century
- Period/culture: Roman Empire
- Discovered: Hoxne, Suffolk, 16 November 1992
- Present location: Room 49, British Museum, London

The Hoxne Hoard (/ˈhɒksən/ HOK-sən) is the largest hoard of late Roman silver and gold discovered in Britain and the largest collection of gold and silver coins of the fourth and fifth centuries found anywhere within the former Roman Empire. It was found by Eric Lawes using a metal detector in the village of Hoxne in Suffolk, England, in 1992. The hoard consists of 14,865 Roman gold, silver, and bronze coins and approximately 200 items of silver tableware and gold jewellery. The objects are now in the British Museum in London, where the most important pieces and a selection of the rest are on permanent display. In 1993, the Treasure Valuation Committee valued the hoard at £1.75 million (about £3.77 million in 2025).

The hoard was buried in an oak box or small chest filled with items in precious metal, sorted mostly by type, with some in smaller wooden boxes and others in bags or wrapped in fabric. Remnants of the chest and fittings, such as hinges and locks, were recovered in the excavation. The coins of the hoard date it after AD 407, which coincides with the end of Britain as a Roman province. The owners and reasons for burial of the hoard are unknown, but it was carefully packed and the contents appear consistent with what a single very wealthy family might have owned. It is likely that the hoard represents only a part of the wealth of its owner, given the lack of large silver serving vessels and some of the most common types of jewellery.

The Hoxne Hoard contains several rare and important objects, such as a gold body-chain and silver-gilt pepper-pots (piperatoria), including the Empress pepper pot. The hoard is also of particular archaeological significance because it was excavated by professional archaeologists with the items largely undisturbed and intact. The find helped to improve the relationship between metal detectorists and archaeologists and influenced a change in English law regarding finds of treasure.

== Archaeological history ==
=== Discovery and initial excavation ===
The village of Hoxne in Suffolk

The hoard was discovered in a farm field southwest of the village of Hoxne in Suffolk on 16 November 1992. Tenant farmer Peter Whatling had lost a hammer and asked his friend Eric Lawes, a retired gardener and amateur metal detectorist, to help look for it. While searching the field with his metal detector, Lawes discovered silver spoons, gold jewelry, and numerous gold and silver coins. After retrieving a few items, he and Whatling notified the landowners (Suffolk County Council) and the police without attempting to dig out any more objects.

The following day, a team of archaeologists from the Suffolk Archaeological Unit carried out an emergency excavation of the site. The entire hoard was excavated in a single day, with the removal of several large blocks of unbroken material for laboratory excavation. The area was searched with metal detectors within a radius of 30 metres (98 ft) from the find spot. Peter Whatling's missing hammer was also recovered and donated to the British Museum.

The hoard was concentrated in a single location, within the completely decayed remains of a wooden chest. The objects had been grouped within the chest; for example, pieces such as ladles and bowls were stacked inside one another, and other items were grouped in a way consistent with being held within an inner box. Some items had been disturbed by burrowing animals and ploughing, but the overall amount of disturbance was low. It was possible to determine the original layout of the artefacts within the container, and the existence of the container itself, due to Lawes' prompt notification of the find, which allowed it to be excavated in situ by professional archaeologists.

The excavated hoard was taken to the British Museum. The discovery was leaked to the press, and the Sun newspaper ran a front-page story on 19 November, alongside a picture of Lawes with his metal detector. The full contents of the hoard and its value were still unknown, yet the newspaper article claimed that it was worth £10 million. In response to the unexpected publicity, the British Museum held a press conference at the museum on 20 November to announce the discovery. Newspapers lost interest in the hoard quickly, allowing British Museum curators to sort, clean, and stabilise it without further disruption from the press. The initial cleaning and basic conservation was completed within a month of its discovery.

=== Inquest and valuation ===
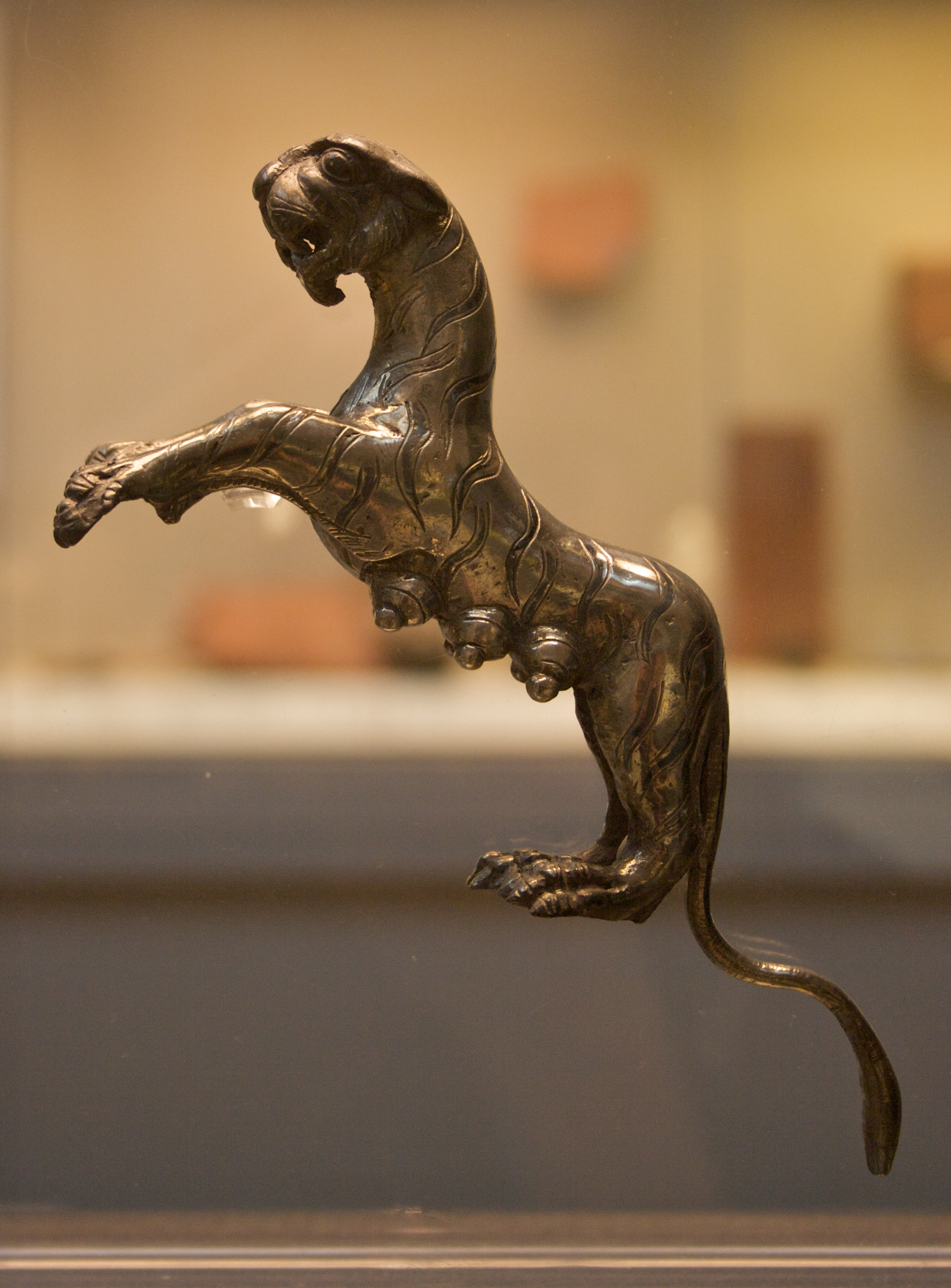
The silver "Hoxne Tigress" – the broken-off handle from an unknown object – is the best known single piece out of some 15,000 in the hoard.

A coroner's inquest was held at Lowestoft on 3 September 1993, and the hoard was declared a treasure trove, meaning that it was deemed to have been hidden with the intention of being recovered at a later date. Under English common law, anything declared as such belongs to the Crown if no one claims title to it. The customary practice at the time was to reward anyone who found and promptly reported a treasure trove with money equivalent to its market value, the money being provided by the national institution that wished to acquire the treasure. In November 1993, the Treasure Trove Reviewing Committee valued the hoard at £1.75 million (about £3.77 million in 2025), which was paid to Lawes as finder of the treasure, and he shared it with farmer Peter Whatling. The Treasure Act 1996 was later enacted, allowing the finder, tenant, and landowner to share in any reward.

=== Subsequent archaeological investigations ===
The Suffolk County Council Archaeological Service surveyed the field in September 1993, after it was ploughed, finding four gold coins and 81 silver coins, all considered part of the same hoard. Both earlier Iron Age and later mediaeval materials were also discovered, but there was no evidence of a Roman settlement in the vicinity.

A follow-up excavation of the field was carried out by the Suffolk County Council Archaeological Service in 1994, in response to illegal metal detecting near the hoard find. The hoard burial hole was re-excavated, and a single post hole was identified at the southwest corner; this may have been the location of a marker post to enable the depositors of the cache to locate and recover it in the future. Soil was removed in 10 cm (3.9 in) spits for analysis in the area 1,000 square metres (11,000 sq ft) around the find spot, and metal detectors were used to locate metal artefacts. This excavation recovered 335 items dating to the Roman period, mostly coins but also some box fittings. A series of late Bronze Age or early Iron Age post holes were found which may have formed a structure. However, no structural features of the Roman period were detected.

The coins discovered during the 1994 investigation were spread out in an ellipse centred on the hoard find spot, running east–west up to a distance of 20 metres (66 ft) on either side. This distribution can be explained by the fact that the farmer carried out deep ploughing in 1990 in an east–west direction on the part of the field where the hoard was found. The farmer had ploughed in a north–south direction since 1967 or 1968, when the land was cleared for agricultural use, but the absence of coins north and south of the find spot suggests that the ploughing before 1990 had not disturbed the hoard.

== Items discovered ==
The hoard is mainly made up of gold and silver coins and jewellery, amounting to a total of 3.5 kilograms (7.7 lb) of gold and 23.75 kilograms (52.4 lb) of silver. It had been placed in a wooden chest, made mostly or entirely of oak, that measured approximately 60×45×30 cm (23.6×17.7×11.8 in). Within the chest, some objects had evidently been placed in smaller boxes made of yew and cherry wood, while others had been packed in with woollen cloth or hay. The chest and the inner boxes had decayed almost completely since the time of burial, but fragments of the chest and its fittings were recovered during the excavation. The main objects found are:

- 569 gold coins (solidi)
- 14,272 silver coins, comprising 60 miliarenses and 14,212 siliquae
- 24 bronze coins (nummi)
- 29 items of jewellery in gold
- 98 silver spoons and ladles
- A silver tigress, made as a handle for a vessel
- 4 silver bowls and a small dish
- 1 silver beaker
- 1 silver vase or juglet
- 4 pepper pots, including the "Empress" pepper pot
- Toiletry items such as toothpicks
- 2 silver locks from the decayed remains of wooden or leather caskets
- Traces of various organic materials, including a small ivory pyxis

=== Coins ===
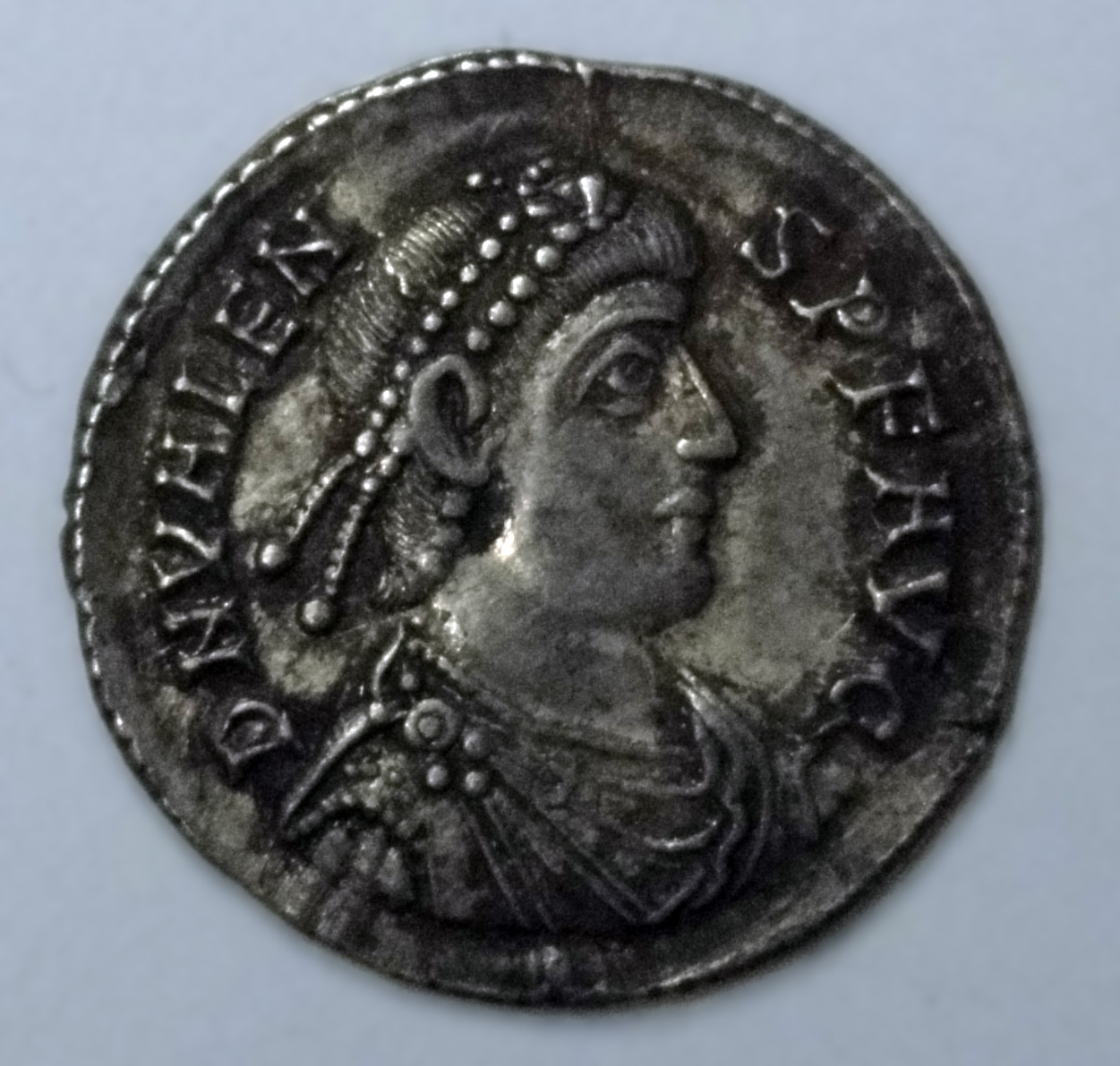
Obverse

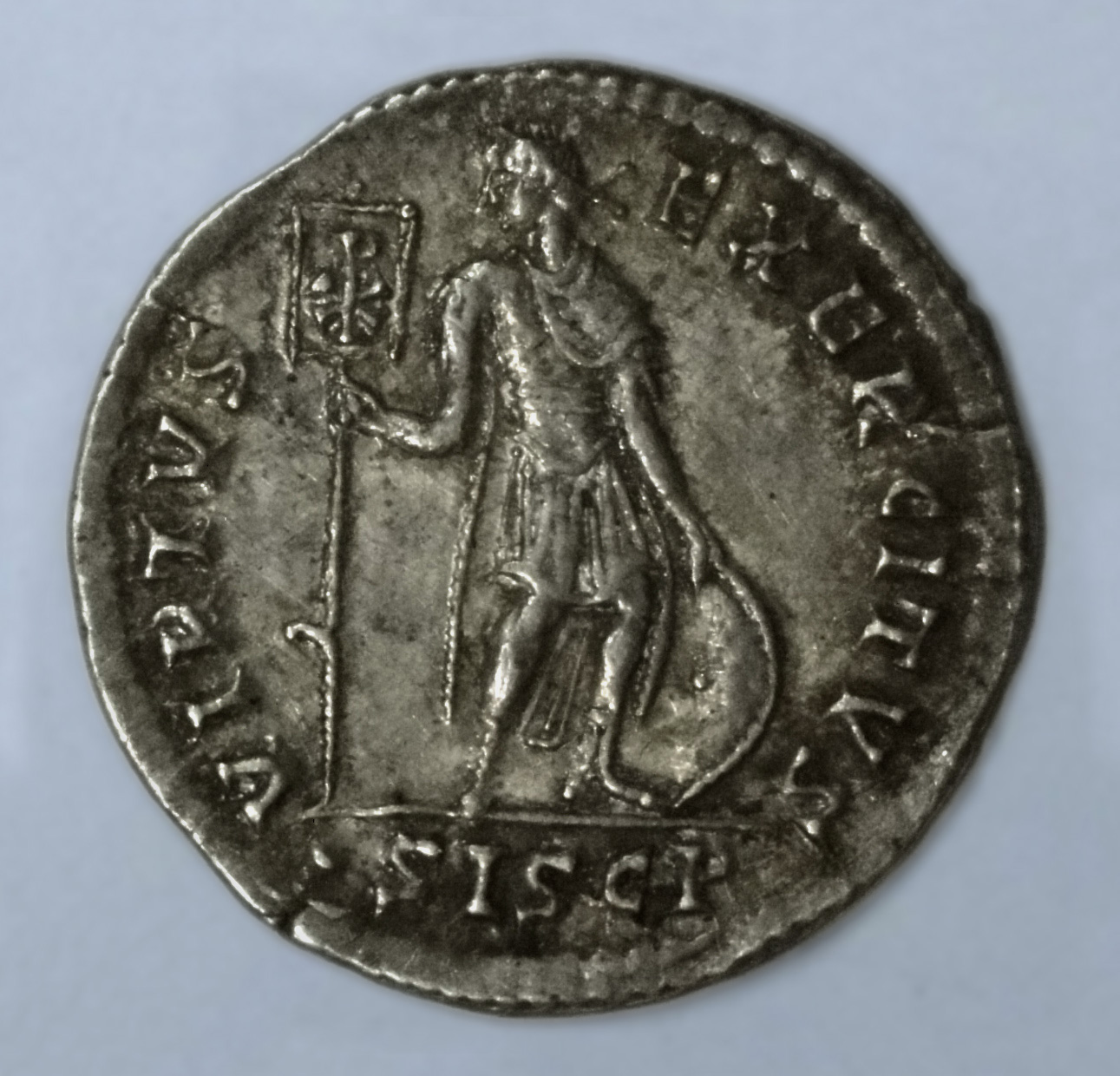
Reverse

Front and back views of a light miliarense coin from the Hoxne Hoard. The reverse side shows the SISCP mint mark (Siscia).

The Hoxne Hoard contains 569 gold solidi, struck between the reigns of Valentinian I (364–75) and Honorius (393–423); 14,272 silver coins, including 60 miliarenses and 14,212 siliquae, struck between the reigns of Constantine II (337–40) and Honorius; and 24 bronze nummi. It is the most significant coin find from the end of Roman Britain and contains all major denominations of coinage from that time, as well as many examples of clipped silver coinage typical of late Roman Britain. The only find from Roman Britain with a larger number of gold coins was the Eye Hoard found in 1780 or 1781, for which there are poor records. The largest single Romano-British hoard was the Cunetio Hoard of 54,951 third-century coins, but these were debased radiates with little precious-metal content. The Frome Hoard was unearthed in Somerset in April 2010 containing 52,503 coins minted between 253 and 305, also mostly debased silver or bronze. Larger hoards of Roman coins have been found at Misrata, Libya and reputedly also at Evreux, France (100,000 coins) and Komin, Croatia (300,000 coins).

The gold solidi are all close to their theoretical weight of 4.48 g (1/72 of a Roman pound). The fineness of a solidus in this period was 99% gold. The total weight of the solidi in the hoard is almost exactly 8 Roman pounds, suggesting that the coins had been measured out by weight rather than number. Analysis of the siliquae suggests a range of fineness of between 95% and 99% silver, with the highest percentage of silver found just after a reform of the coinage in 368. Of the siliquae, 428 are locally produced imitations, generally of high quality and with as much silver as the official siliquae of the period. However, a handful are cliché forgeries where a core of base metal has been wrapped in silver foil.

==== Historical spread and minting ====
Coins from the hoard came from several locations across the Roman Empire (modern-day boundaries shown).

Coins are the only items in the Hoxne Hoard for which a definite date and place of manufacture can be established. All of the gold coins, and many of the silver coins, bear the names and portraits of the emperor in whose reign they were minted. Most also retain the original mint marks that identify where they were minted, illustrating the Roman system of regional mints producing coins to a uniform design. The coins' manufacture has been traced back to a total of 14 sources: Trier, Arles and Lyon (in Gaul), Ravenna, Milan, Aquileia, Rome (in modern Italy); Siscia (modern Croatia), Sirmium (modern Serbia), Thessaloniki (Greece), Constantinople, Cyzicus, Nicomedia, and Antioch (modern Turkey).

The coins were minted under three dynasties of Roman emperors. The earliest are the successors of the Constantinian dynasty, followed by the Valentinianic emperors, and finally the Theodosian emperors. The collegiate system of rule (or Consortium imperii) meant that imperial partners would mint coins in each other's names at the mints under their jurisdiction. The overlapping reigns of Eastern and Western emperors often allow changes of type to be dated to within part of a reign. So the latest coins in the hoard, of Western ruler Honorius (393–423) and his challenger Constantine III (407–11), can be demonstrated to belong to the earlier parts of their reigns as they correspond to the lifetime of the Eastern Emperor Arcadius, who died in 408. Thus, the coins provide a terminus post quem or earliest possible date for the deposition of the hoard of 408.

The siliquae in the Hoard were struck mainly at Western mints in Gaul and Italy. It is unknown whether this is because coins from further East rarely reached Britain through trade, or because the Eastern mints rarely struck siliquae. The production of coins seems to follow the location of the Imperial court at the time; for instance, the concentration of Trier coins is much greater after 367, perhaps associated with Gratian moving his court to Trier.

Table of mints and periods of gold solidi in the Hoxne Hoard
Mint	364–7	367–75	375–8	378–88	388–95	394–402	402–8	Total
Aquileia							2	2
Constantinople				4		1		5
Lyons					5			5
Milan				15	6	367		388
Ravenna							54	54
Rome					1		38	39
Sirmium					8			8
Thessaloniki	1							1
Trier		6	6	8	58			78
Total	1	6	6	27	78	368	94	580

==== Clipping of the silver coins ====
Almost every silver siliqua in the hoard had its edge clipped to some degree. This is typical of Roman silver coin finds of this period in Britain, although clipped coins are very unusual through the rest of the Roman Empire. The clipping process invariably leaves the imperial portrait intact on the front of the coin but often damages the mint mark, inscription, and image on the reverse.

The possible reasons for clipping coins are controversial. Possible explanations include fraud, a deliberate attempt to maintain a stable ratio between gold and silver coins, or an official attempt to provide a new source of silver bullion while maintaining the same number of coins in circulation.

The huge number of clipped coins in the Hoxne Hoard has made it possible for archaeologists to observe the process of coin-clipping in detail. The coins were evidently cut face-up to avoid damaging the portrait. The average level of clipping is roughly the same for coins dating from 350 onwards.

Comparison of unclipped and clipped siliquae
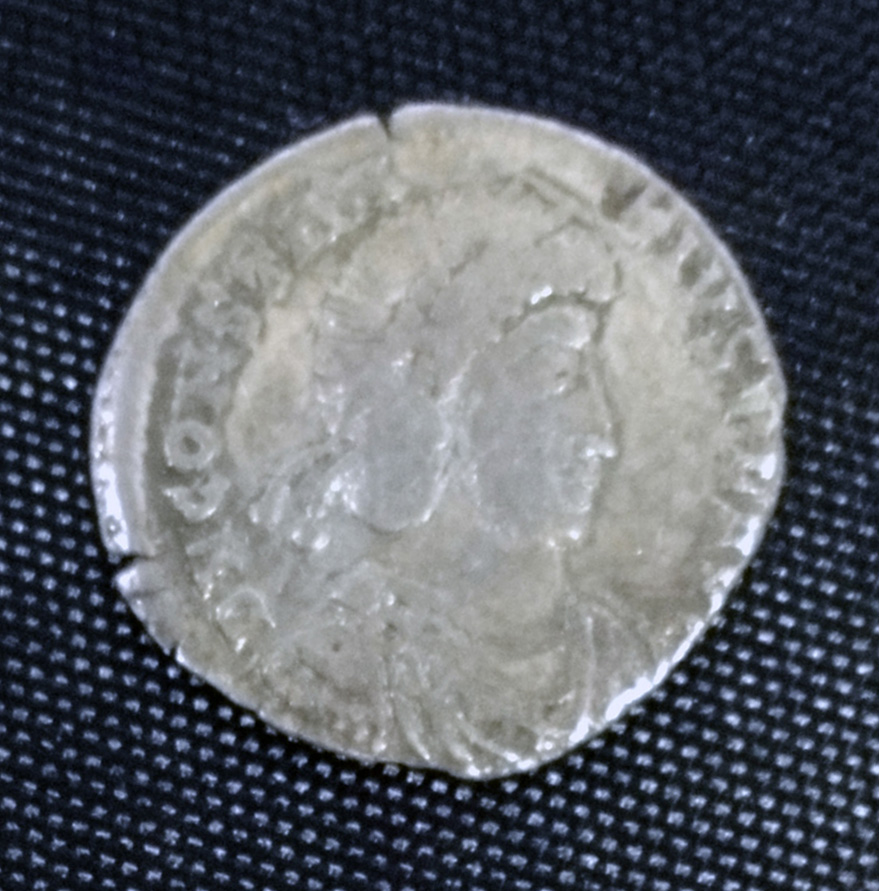
An unclipped siliqua

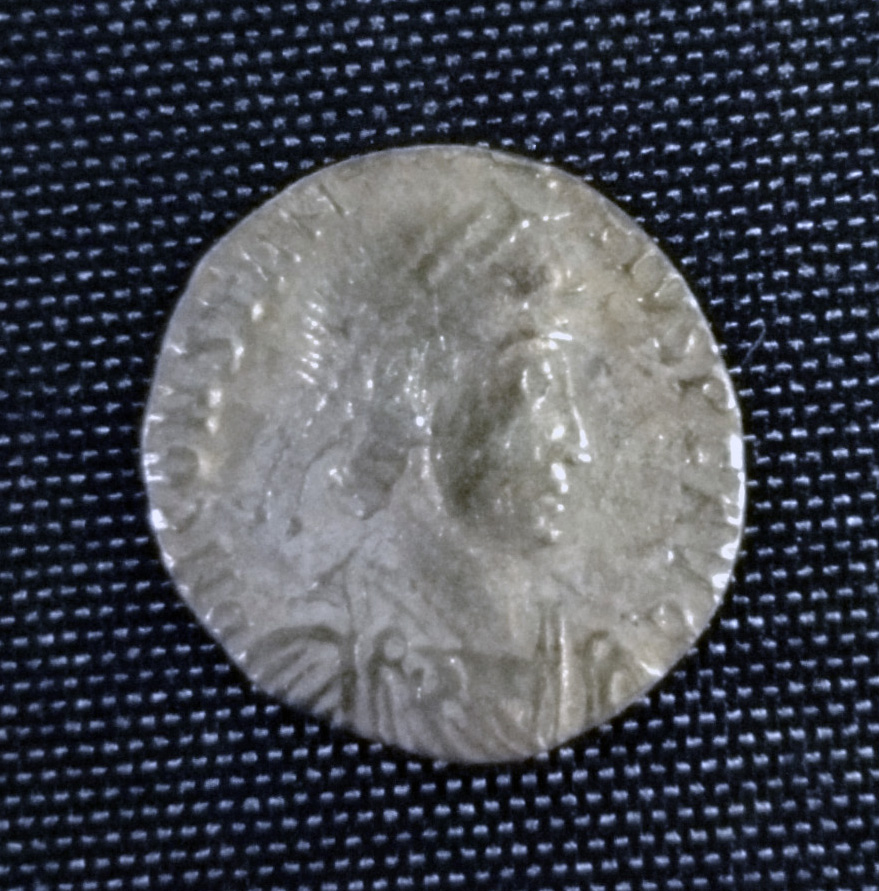
Partially clipped siliqua

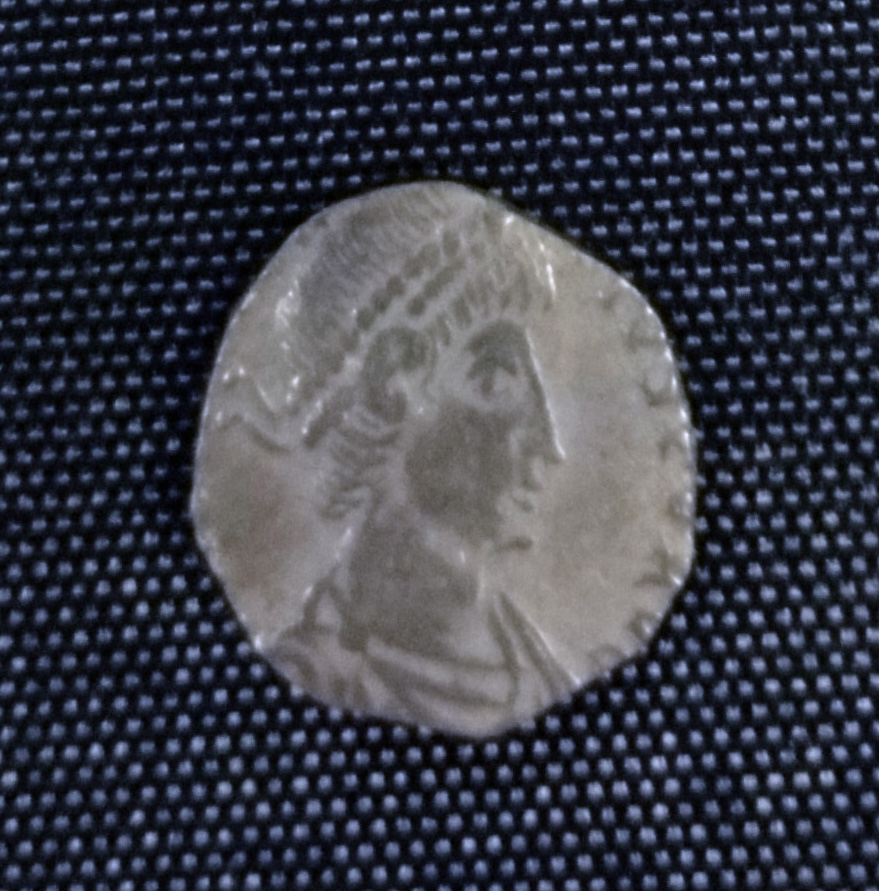
A heavily clipped siliqua

=== Gold jewellery ===
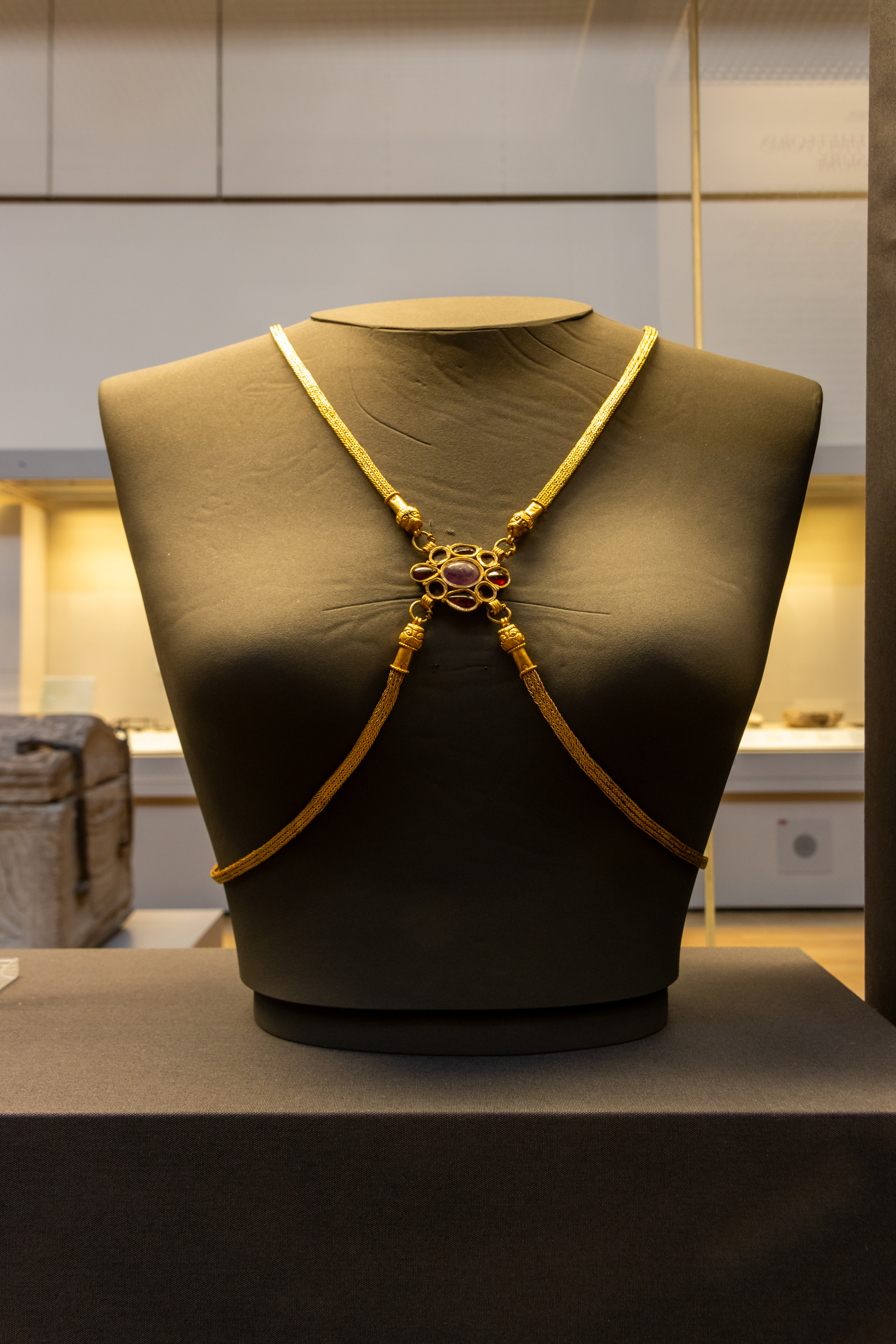
Front view of the gold body chain from the Hoxne Hoard. Visible are an amethyst and four garnets; four other gems are missing, thought to have been pearls.

All the jewellery in the hoard is gold, and all gold items in the hoard are jewellery, other than the coins. None of the jewellery is unequivocally masculine, although several pieces might have been worn by either sex, such as the rings. There are one body chain, six necklaces, three rings, and nineteen bracelets. The total weight of the gold jewellery is about 1 kilogram (2.2 lb), and the average metal content of the jewellery pieces is 91.5% gold (about 22 carat), with small proportions of silver and copper in the metal.

The most important gold item in the hoard is the body chain, which consists of four finely looped gold chains, made using the "loop-in-loop" method called "fox tail" in modern jewellery, and attached at front and back to plaques. At the front, the chains have terminals in the shape of lions' heads and the plaque has jewels mounted in gold cells, with a large amethyst surrounded by four smaller garnets alternating with four empty cells which probably held pearls that have decayed. At the back, the chains meet at a mount centred on a gold solidus of Gratian (r. 375–383) which has been converted from an earlier use, probably as a pendant, and which may have been a family heirloom. Body chains of this type appear in Roman art, sometimes on the goddess Venus or on nymphs; some examples have erotic contexts, but they are also worn by respectable high-ranking ladies. They may have been regarded as a suitable gift for a bride. The Hoxne body chain, worn tightly, would fit a woman with a bust-size of 76–81 cm (30–32 in). Few body chains have survived; one of the most complete is from the early Byzantine era, found in Egypt, and it also is in the British Museum.

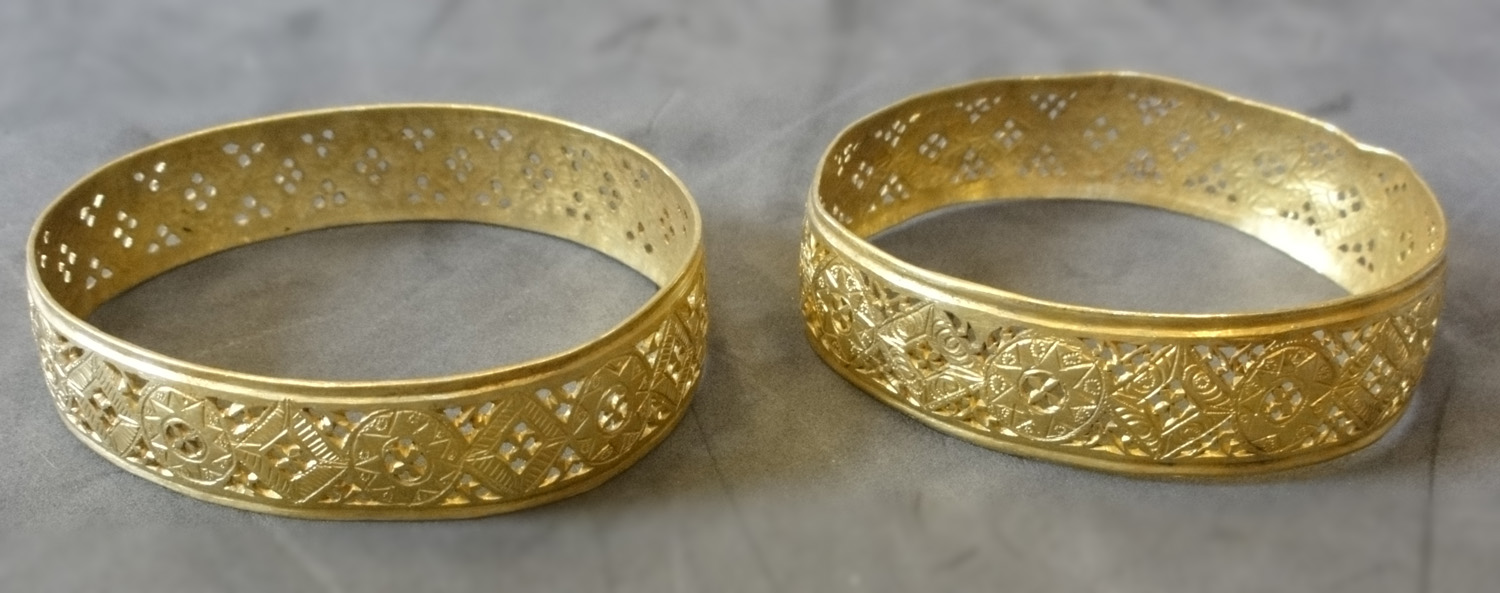
Two pierced-work gold bracelets

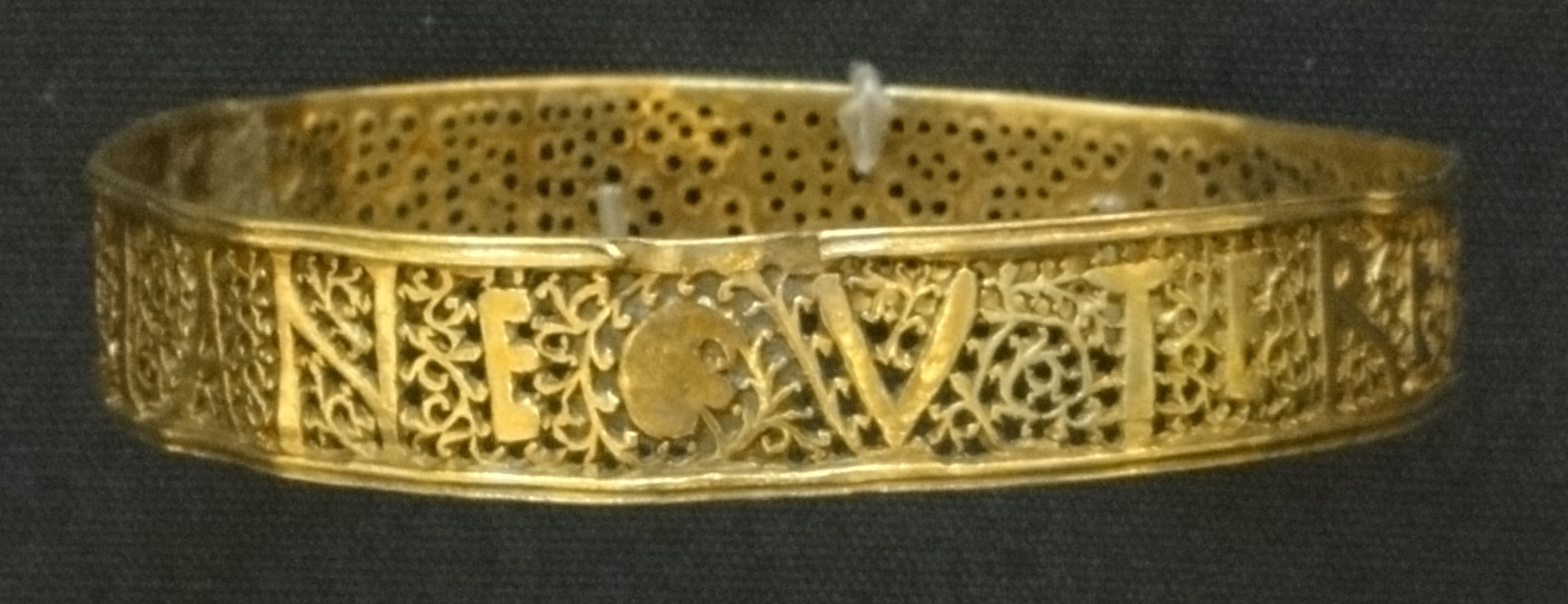
"Juliane" inscribed bracelet

One of the necklaces features lion-headed terminals, and another includes stylised dolphins. The other four are relatively plain loop-in-loop chains, although one has a Chi-Rho symbol (☧) on the clasp, the only Christian element in the jewellery. Necklaces of similar lengths would normally be worn in the Roman period with a pendant, but no pendants were found in the hoard. The three rings were originally set with gems, which might have been natural gemstones or pieces of coloured glass; however, these were taken from the rings before they were buried, perhaps for re-use. The rings are of similar design, one with an oval bezel, one with a circular bezel, and one with a large oblong bezel. There were 19 bracelets buried in the hoard, including three matching sets of four made of gold. Many similar bracelets have survived, but sets of four are most unusual; they may have been worn two on each arm, or possibly were shared by two related women. One set has been decorated by corrugating the gold with lateral and transverse grooves; the other two sets bear pierced-work geometric designs. Another five bracelets bear hunting scenes, common in Late Roman decorative art. Three have the designs executed in pierced-work, whereas two others are in repoussé. One bracelet is the sole gold item in the hoard to carry an inscription; it reads: "VTERE FELIX DOMINA IVLIANE" in Latin, meaning "Use [this] happily, Lady Juliane". The expression utere felix (or sometimes uti felix) is the second most common inscriptional formula on items from Roman Britain and is used to wish good luck, well-being, and joy. The formula is not specifically Christian, but it sometimes occurs in an explicitly Christian context, for example, together with a Chi-Rho symbol.

The jewellery may have represented the "reserve" items rarely or never used from the collection of a wealthy woman or family. Some of the most common types of jewellery are absent, such as brooches, pendants, and earrings. Items set with gems are notably missing, although they were very much in the taste of the day. Catherine Johns, former Senior Curator for Roman Britain at the British Museum, speculates that the current or favourite jewellery of the owner was not included in the hoard.

=== Silver items ===
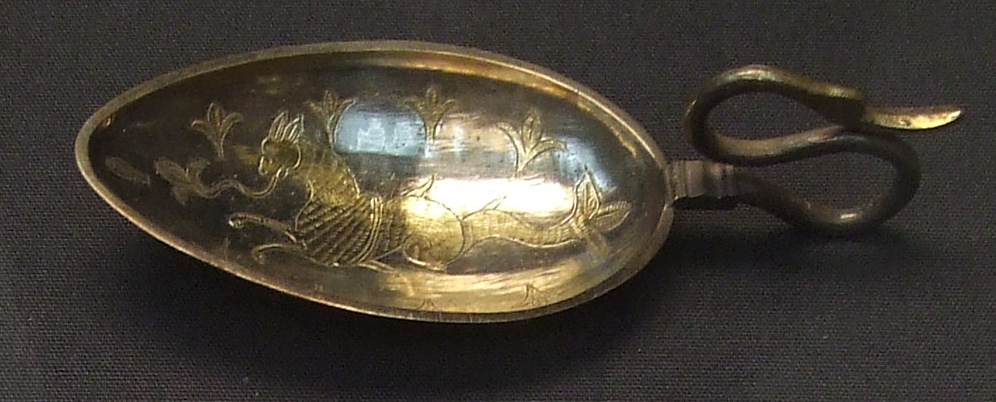
Silver-gilt cignus spoon decorated with a mythical marine creature

The hoard contains about 100 silver and silver-gilt items; the number is imprecise because there are unmatched broken parts. They include a statuette of a leaping tigress, made as a handle for an object such as a jug or lamp; four pepper-pots (piperatoria); a beaker; a vase or juglet (a small jug); four bowls; a small dish; and 98 silver spoons and ladles. The beaker and juglet are decorated with similar leaf and stem patterns, and the juglet has three gilded bands. In contrast, the small bowls and dish are plain, and it is presumed that the owners of the Hoard had many more such items, probably including the large decorated dishes found in other hoards. Many pieces are gilded in parts to accentuate the decoration. The technique of fire-gilding with mercury was used, as was typical at the time.

==== Piperatoria ====
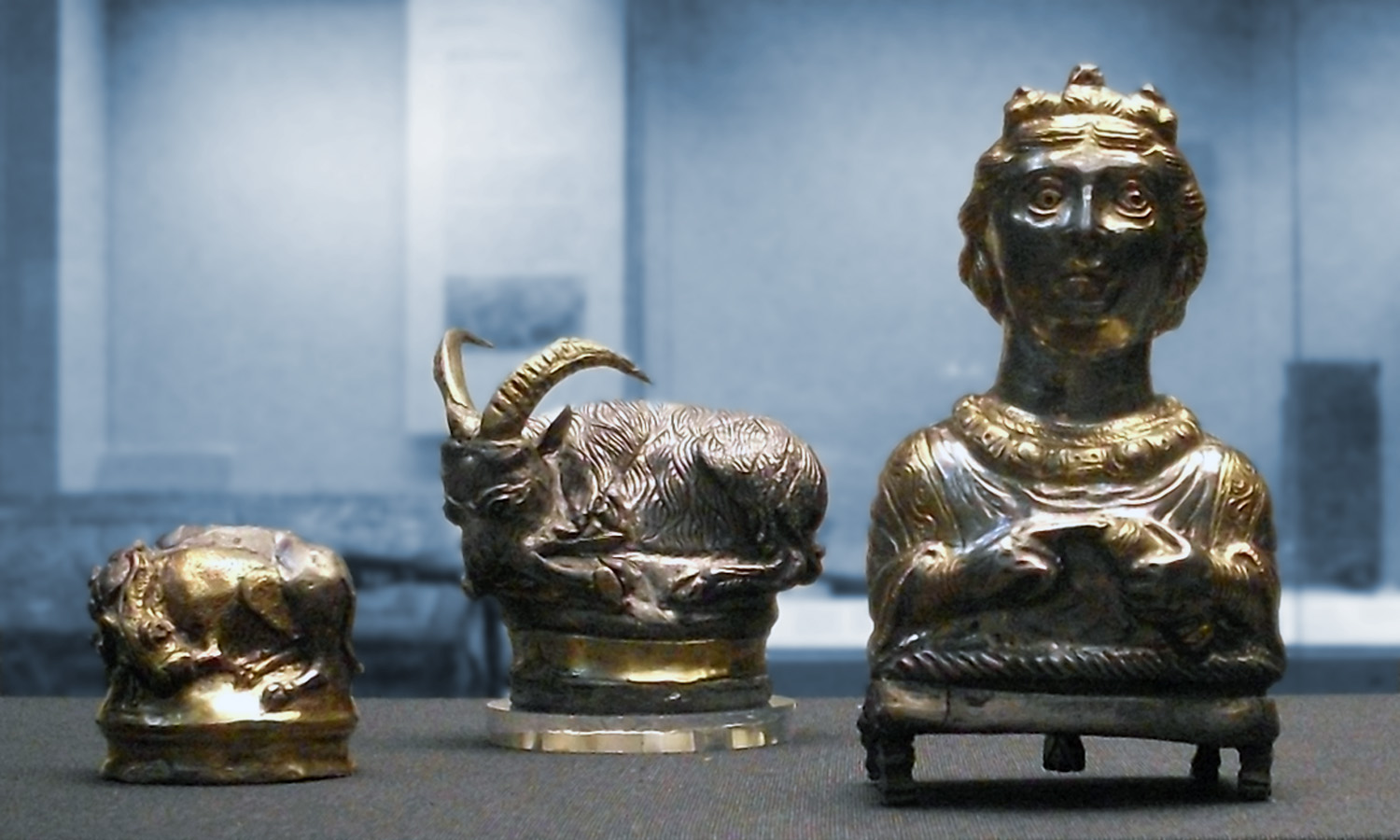
Piperatoria – display of a selection of spice dispensers from the hoard, the pepper-pot on the right depicts an elegant and learned lady

The pepper-pots include one vessel, finely modelled after a wealthy or imperial lady, which soon became known as the "Empress" pepper-pot. (Note: At the time of excavation iconographically similar images of an imperial lady were known on the Late Antique bronze weights used on the portable balances known as steelyards. Initially, these mistakenly were thought to be of an empress. In recent years, the term "empress" has been discarded as incorrect as a term to describe the figures on steelyard weights. Although the pepper pot now would be more correctly described as a "lady", the term "empress" continues in common use, even though the image is no longer thought to have been intended to depict an empress.) The woman's hair, jewellery, and clothing are carefully represented, and gilding is used to emphasise many details. She is holding a scroll in her left hand, giving the impression of education as well as wealth. Other pepper-pots in the hoard are modelled into a statue of Hercules and Antaeus, an ibex, and a hare and hound together. Not all such spice dispensers held pepper — they were used to dispense other spices as well — but are grouped in discussions as pepper-pots. Each of those found in this hoard has a mechanism in the base to rotate an internal disc, which controls the aperture of two holes in the base. When fully open, the containers could have been filled using a funnel; when part-open they could have been shaken over food or drink to add the spices.

Piperatorium is generally translated as pepper-pot, and black pepper is considered the most likely condiment these were used for. Pepper is only one of a number of expensive, high-status spices which these vessels might have dispensed, however. The piperatoria are rare examples of this type of Roman silverware, and according to Johns the Hoxne finds have "significantly expanded the date range, the typology and the iconographic scope of the type". The trade and use of pepper in this period has been supported with evidence of mineralized black pepper at three Northern Province sites recovered in the 1990s, (Note: Catherine Johns lists three comparative statue-shaped pepper pots, one from Chaourse in Gaul, one from Nicolaevo and another possibly from Lebanon.) and from the Vindolanda tablets which record the purchase of an unspecified quantity of pepper for two denarii. Archaeological sites with contemporary finds have revealed spices, including coriander, poppy, celery, dill, summer savory, mustard, and fennel. (Note: Evidence of the trade in other flavourings comes from recipes and legal texts published in Roman times, the Edict on Maximum Prices of 301 includes saffron, ginger, cardamom, and pepper. The Prices Edict (ch 34.67) sets a maximum price for (long) pepper at 800 denarii per pound (gold has a maximum value of 72,000 denarii/lb in the same text). Comparison with earlier sources such as Pliny's Natural History (bk 12.28–29) in 77–79 AD where values were given for long pepper at 15 denarii/lb, 7 denarii/lb for white, and 4 denarii/lb for black are problematic due to inflation in the intervening decades.)

They just couldn't get enough of it, wars were fought over it. And if you look at Roman recipes, every one starts with: 'Take pepper and mix with ...' (Christine McFadden, food writer)

When the Romans came to Britain they brought a lot of material culture and a lot of habits with them that made the people of Britain feel Roman; they identified with the Roman culture. Wine was one of these – olive oil was another – and pepper would have been a more valuable one in this same sort of 'set' of Romanitas. (Roberta Tomber, British Museum Visiting Fellow)

So regularly filling a large silver pepper pot like ours would have taken its toll on the grocery bills. And the household that owned our pepper pot had another three silver pots, for pepper or other spice – one shaped as Hercules in action, and two in the shape of animals. This is dizzying extravagance, the stuff of bankers' bonuses. But the pepper pots are just a tiny part of the great hoard of buried treasure. (Neil MacGregor, British Museum Director)

— A History of the World in 100 Objects (Note: These quotes are from the transcript of the BBC radio broadcast. McFadden has written on the subject of the history of pepper and cooking, and Tomber is a historian who has published and researched in the subject of the spice trade during the Roman period.), BBC Radio 4, June 2010

==== Other silver pieces ====
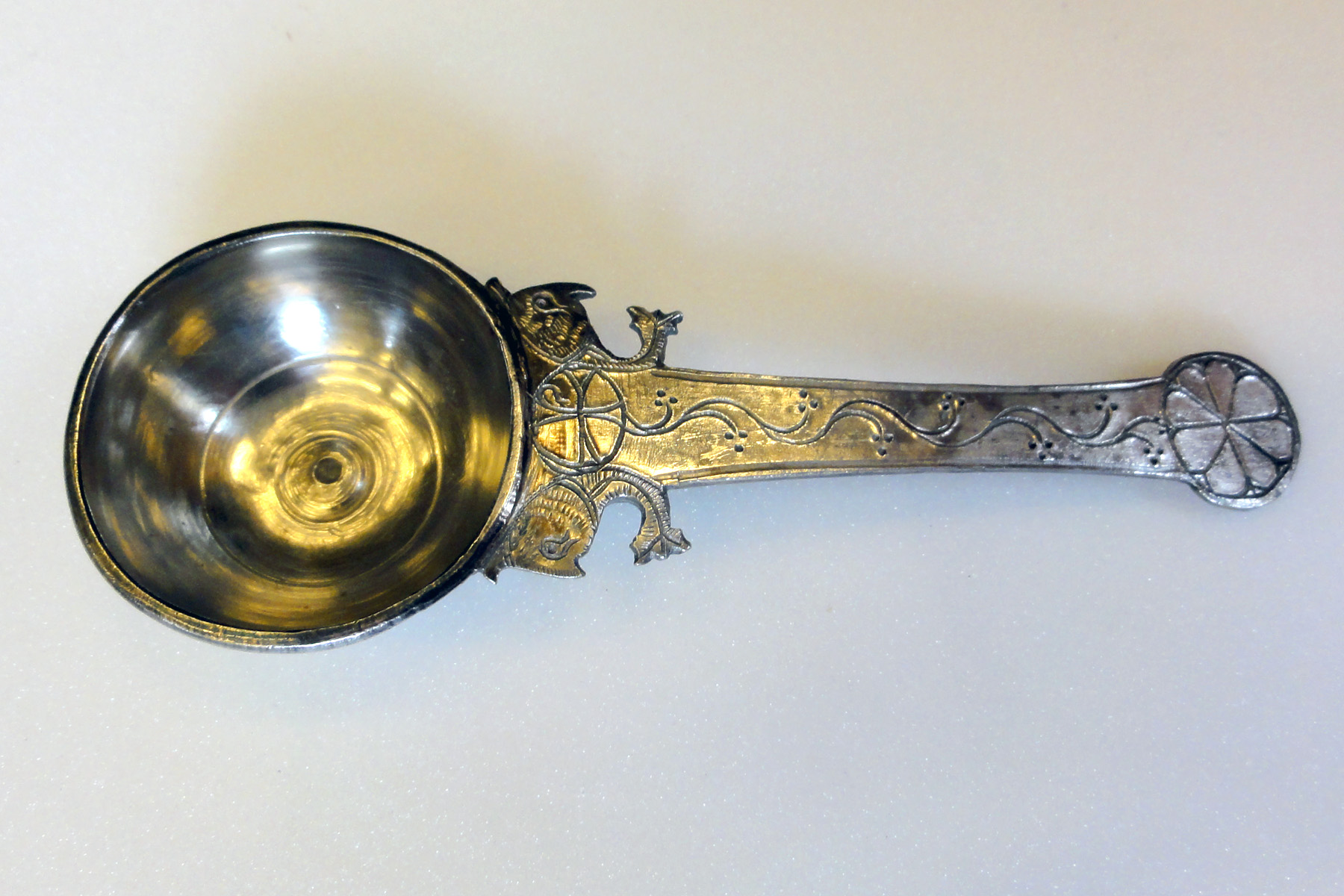
A 13 cm (5.1 in) long "ladle" from the hoard, with decoration including a Chi-Rho and sea-creatures

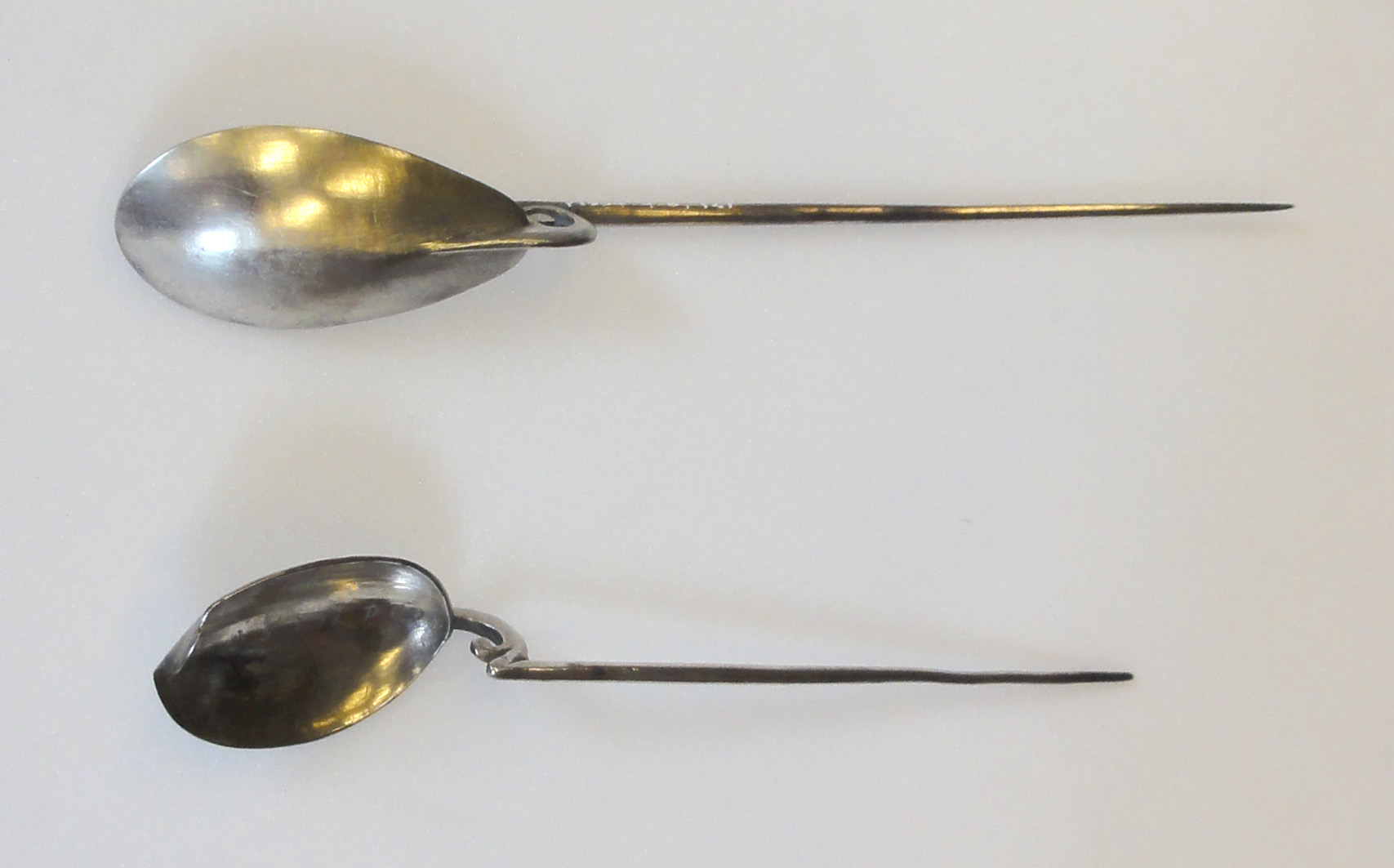
Two cochlearia from the hoard

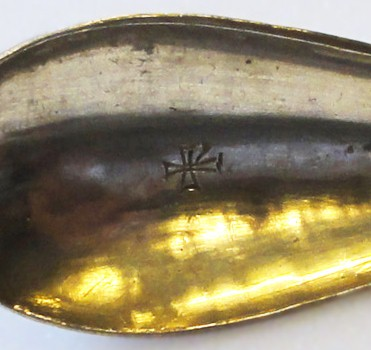
Cochlearium detail showing inscribed Christian monogram cross in the base of the bowl

The tigress is a solid-cast statuette weighing 480 grams (17 oz) and measuring 15.9 cm (6.3 in) from head to tail. It was designed to be soldered onto some other object as its handle; traces of tin were found beneath its rear paws, which have a "smoothly concave curve". It looks most aesthetically pleasing when the serpentine curves of its head, back, rump, and tail form a line at an angle of about 45°, when the rear paws are flat, allowing for their curve. Its gender is obvious as there are six engorged teats under its belly. It is carefully decorated on its back, but its underside is "quite perfunctorily finished". Its stripes are represented by two engraved lines, with a black niello inlay between them, in most places not meeting the engraved lines. Neither its elongated body, nor the distribution of the stripes are accurate for the species; it has a long dorsal stripe running from the skull along the spine to the start of the tail, which is typical of tabby cats rather than tigers. The figure has no stripes around its tail, which thickens at the end, suggesting a thick fur tip as in a lion's tail, which tigers do not have, although Roman art usually gives them one.

The large collection of spoons includes 51 cochlearia, which are small spoons with shallow bowls and long, tapering handles with a pointed end which was used to pierce eggs and spear small pieces of food—as the Romans did not use forks at the table. There are 23 cigni, which are much rarer, having large rather shallow spoons with shorter, bird-headed handles; and about 20 deep round spoons or small ladles and strainer-spoons. Many are decorated with abstract motifs and some with dolphins or fanciful marine creatures. Many of the spoons are decorated with a Christian monogram cross or Chi-Rho symbol, and sometimes, also with the Greek letters alpha and omega (an appellation for Jesus, who is described as the alpha and omega in the Book of Revelation). Three sets of ten spoons, and several other spoons, are decorated with such Christian symbols. As is often the case with Roman silver spoons, many also have a Latin inscription on them, either simply naming their owner or wishing their owner long life. In total, eight different people are named; seven on the spoons, and one on the single beaker in the hoard: Aurelius Ursicinus, Datianus, Euherius, Faustinus, Peregrinus, Quintus, Sanctus, and Silvicola. The most common name is "Aurelius Ursicinus", which occurs on a set of five cochlearia and five ladles. It is unknown whether any of the people named in these inscriptions would have been involved in hiding the hoard or were even alive at the time it was buried.

Although only one of these inscriptions is explicitly Christian (vivas in deo), inscriptions on silver spoons comprising a name followed by vivas or vivat usually can be identified as Christian in other late Roman hoards; for example the Mildenhall Treasure has five spoons, three with Chi-Rho monograms, and two with vivas inscriptions (PASCENTIA VIVAS and PAPITTEDO VIVAS). The formula vir bone vivas also occurs on a spoon from the Thetford Hoard, but whereas the Thetford Hoard spoons have mostly pagan inscriptions (e.g. Dei Fau[ni] Medugeni "of the god Faunus Medugenus [the Mead begotten]"), the Hoxne Hoard does not have any inscriptions of a specifically pagan nature, and the hoard may be considered to have come from a Christian household (or households). It often is assumed that Roman spoons with Chi-Rho monograms or the vivas in deo formula are either christening spoons (perhaps presented at adult baptism) or were used in the Eucharist ceremony, but that is not certain.

Table of inscriptions on silver tableware (Note: For an analysis of inscriptions by Roger Tomlin, and a summary list of the inscriptions, see Johns 2010, pp. 165–173, 263–264.)
Reference number	Inscription	Transcription	Translation	Notes
1994,0408.31	EVHERIVIVAS	Euheri vivas	"Euherius, may you live"	Beaker. The name may also have been Eucherius or Eutherius.
1994,0408.81–83	AVRVRSICINI	Aur[elius] Ursicini	"(property of) Aurelius Ursicinus"	Three spoons (ligula or cignus)
1994,0408.84–85	AVRVRSICINVS	Aur[elius] Ursicinus	"Aurelius Ursicinus"	Two spoons (ligula or cignus)
1994,0408.86–88	AVRVRSICINI	Aur[elius] Ursicini	"(property of) Aurelius Ursicinus"	Three spoons (cochlearia)
1994,0408.89–90	AVRVRSICINI	Aur[elius] Ursicini	"(property of) Aurelius Ursicinus"	Two spoons (cochlearia), also inscribed with the Chi-Rho monogram and alpha and omega
1994,0408.101–102	PEREGRINVS VIVAT	Peregrinus vivat	"Peregrinus, may he live"	Two spoons (ligula or cignus)
1994,0408.103–105	QVISSVNTVIVAT	Quintus vivat	"Quintus, may he live"	Three spoons (ligula or cignus). Inscription is an error for QVINTVSVIVAT
1994,0408.106	PEREGRINI	Peregrini	"(property of) Peregrinus"	Spoon (cochlearium)
1994,0408.107–110	SILVICOLAVIVAS	Silvicola vivas	"Silvicola, may you live"	Set of four cochlearia
1994,0408.115	PER PR	Per[egrinus] Pr[imus] ?	"Peregrinus Primus"	Scratched graffiti on a spoon (ligula or cignus)
1994,0408.116	FAVSTINEVIVAS	Faustine vivas	"Faustinus, may you live"	Spoon (ligula or cignus)
1994,0408.117	VIRBONEVIVAS	Vir bone vivas	"Good man, may you live"	Spoon (ligula or cignus)
1994,0408.122	[V]IVASINDEO	Vivas in deo	"May you live in god"	Spoon (cochlearium)
1994,0408.129	SANC	Sanc[tus]	"Sanctus"	Spoon (cochlearium)
1994,0408.133	DATIANIAEVIVAS	Datiane vivas	"Datianus, may you live"	Spoon (cochlearium). Inscription is an error for DATIANEVIVAS

Table of monograms and symbols on tableware with no text
Reference number	Monogram or symbol	Notes
1994,0408.52–61	Chi-rho monogram	Ladle
1994,0408.91–100	Monogram cross	Spoon
1994,0408.118–119	Chi-Rho, alpha and omega	Spoon (ligula or cignus)
1994,0408.135	Chi-rho monogram	Spoon

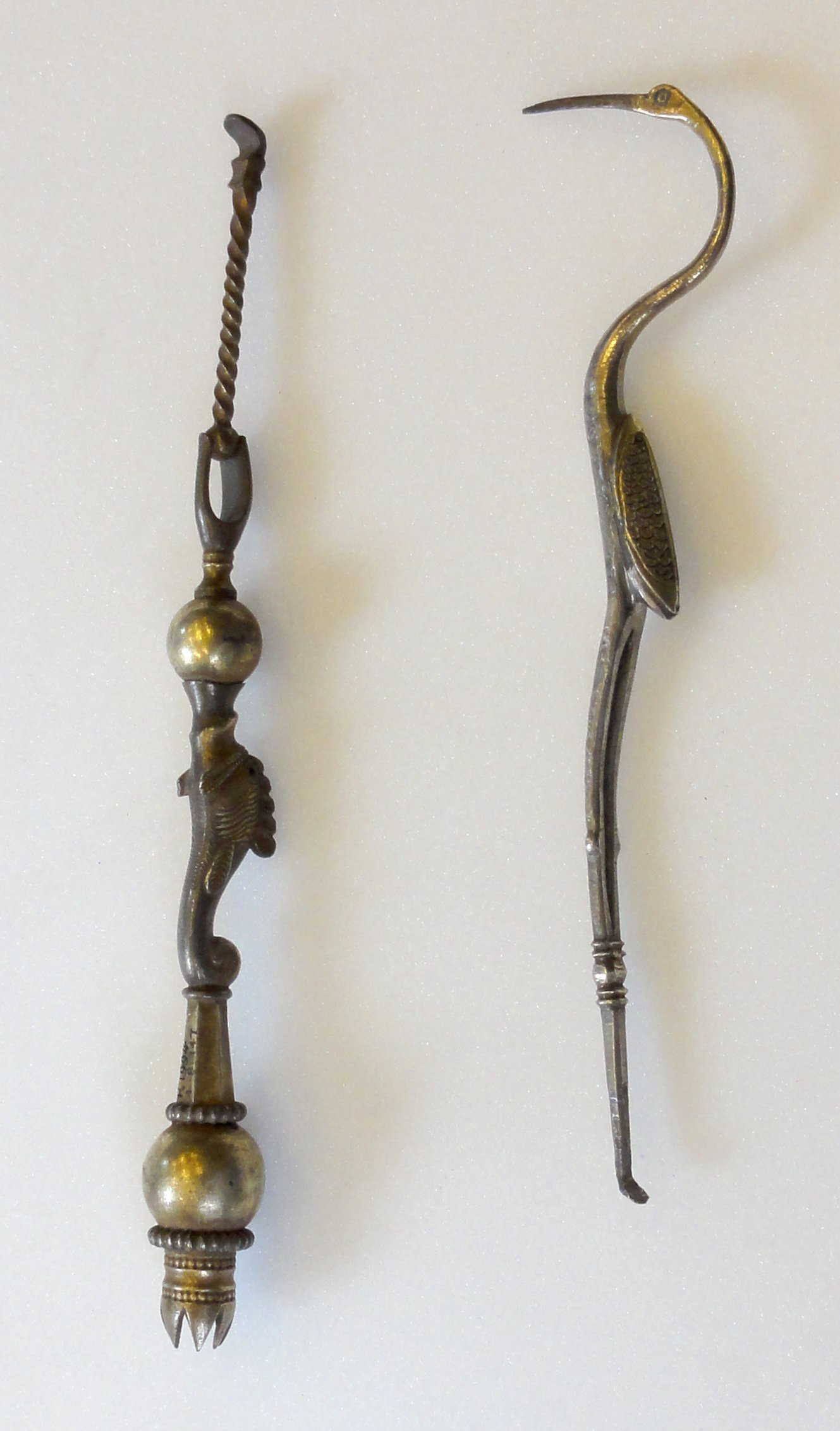
Two toiletry items: one in the shape of a crane-like bird; the other with an empty socket, probably for bristles for a makeup brush

There are also a number of small items of uncertain function, described as toiletry pieces. Some are picks, others perhaps scrapers, and three have empty sockets at one end, which probably contained organic material such as bristle, to make a brush. The size of these would be appropriate for cleaning the teeth or applying cosmetics, among other possibilities.

The average purity of the silver items is 96%. The remainder of the metal is made up of copper and a small amount of zinc, with trace amounts of lead, gold, and bismuth present. The zinc is likely to have been present in a copper brass used to alloy the silver when the objects were made, and the lead, gold, and bismuth probably were present in the unrefined silver ore.

=== Iron and organic materials ===
The iron objects found in the hoard are probably the remains of the outer wooden chest. These consist of large iron rings, double-spiked loops and hinges, strap hinges, probable components of locks, angle brackets, wide and narrow iron strips, and nails.

Organic finds are rarely well documented with hoards because most coin and treasure finds are removed hastily by the finder or have previously been disrupted by farm work rather than excavated. The Hoxne organic finds included bone, wood, other plant material, and leather. Small fragments were found from a decorated ivory pyxis (a cylindrical lidded box), along with more than 150 tiny shaped pieces of bone inlay or veneer, probably from a wooden box or boxes that have decayed. Minuscule fragments of wood adhering to metal objects were identified as belonging to nine species of timber, all native to Britain; wood traces associated with the iron fittings of the outer chest established that it was made of oak. Silver locks and hinges were from two small wooden boxes or caskets, one made of decorative cherry wood and one made of yew. Some wheat straw survived from padding between the plain silver bowls, which also bore faint traces of linen cloth. Leather fragments were too degraded for identification.

== Scientific analysis of finds ==
The initial metallurgical analysis of the hoard was carried out in late 1992 and early 1993 by Cowell and Hook for the procedural purposes of the coroner's inquest. This analysis used X-ray fluorescence, a technique that was applied again later to cleaned surfaces on specimens.

All 29 items of gold jewellery were analysed, with silver and copper found to be present. Results were typical for Roman silver in hoards of the period, in terms of the presence of copper alloyed with the silver to harden it, and trace elements. One repaired bowl showed a mercury-based solder.

The large armlet of pierced gold (opus interrasile) showed traces of hematite on the reverse side, which probably would have been used as a type of jeweller's rouge. This is the earliest known and documented use of this technique on Roman jewellery. Gilt items showed the presence of mercury, indicating the mercury gilding technique. The black inlay on the cast silver tigress shows the niello technique, but with silver sulphide rather than lead sulphide. The settings of stones where garnet and amethyst remain, in the body chain, have vacant places presumed to be where pearls were set, and show elemental sulphur as adhesive or filler.

== Burial and historical background ==
The Hoxne Hoard was buried during a period of great upheaval in Britain, marked by the collapse of Roman authority in the province, the departure of the majority of the Roman army, and the first of a wave of attacks by the Anglo-Saxons. Attacks on Italy by the Visigoths around the turn of the fifth century caused the general Stilicho to recall some Roman army units from Rhaetia, Gaul, and Britannia. While Stilicho held off the Visigoth attack, the Western provinces were left defenceless against Suebi, Alans, and Vandals who crossed the frozen Rhine in 406 and overran Gaul. The remaining Roman troops in Britain, fearing that the invaders would cross the Channel, elected a series of emperors of their own to lead the defence.

The first two such emperors were put to death by the dissatisfied soldiery in a matter of months, but the third, who would declare himself Constantine III, led a British force across the English Channel to Gaul in his bid to become Roman Emperor. After scoring victories against the "barbarians" in Gaul, Constantine was defeated by an army loyal to Honorius and beheaded in 411. Meanwhile, Constantine's departure had left Britain vulnerable to attacks from Saxon and Irish raiders.

After 410, Roman histories give little information about events in Britain. Writing in the next decade, Saint Jerome described Britain after 410 as a "province fertile of tyrants", suggesting the collapse of central authority and the rise of local leaders in response to repeated raids by Saxons and others. By 452, a Gaulish chronicler was able to state that some ten years previously "the Britons, which to this time had suffered from various disasters and misfortunes, are reduced by the power of the Saxons".

=== Burial ===
Exactly who owned the Hoxne Hoard, and their reasons for burying it, are not known, and probably never will be. However, the hoard itself and its context provide some important clues. The hoard evidently was buried carefully, some distance from any buildings. The hoard very likely represents only a portion of the precious-metal wealth of the person, or people, who owned it; many common types of jewellery are missing, as are large tableware items such as those found in the Mildenhall Treasure. It is unlikely that anyone would have possessed the rich gold and silver items found in the Hoxne Hoard without owning items in those other categories. Whoever owned the hoard also would have had wealth in the form of land, livestock, buildings, furniture, and clothing. At most, the Hoxne Hoard represents a moderate portion of the wealth of someone rich; conversely, it may represent a minuscule fraction of the wealth of a family that was incredibly wealthy.

The appearance of the names "Aurelius Ursicinus" and "Juliane" on items in the Hoxne Hoard need not imply that people by those names owned the rest of the hoard, either at the time of its burial or previously. There are no historical references to an "Aurelius Ursicinus" in Britain in this period. While a "Marcus Aurelius Ursicinus" is recorded in the Praetorian Guard in Rome in the period 222–235, a soldier or official of the late fourth or early fifth century would be more likely to take the imperial nomen Flavius, rather than Aurelius. This leads Tomlin to speculate "The name "Aurelius Ursicinus" might sound old-fashioned; it would certainly have been more appropriate to a provincial landowner than an army officer or government official".

There are a number of theories about why the hoard was buried. One is that the hoard represented a deliberate attempt to keep wealth safe, perhaps in response to one of the many upheavals facing Roman Britain in the early fifth century. This is not the only hypothesis, however. Archaeologist Peter Guest argues that the hoard was buried because the items in it were used as part of a system of gift-exchange, and as Britain separated from the Roman Empire, they were no longer required. A third hypothesis is that the Hoxne Hoard represents the proceeds of a robbery, buried to avoid detection.

=== Late Roman hoards ===
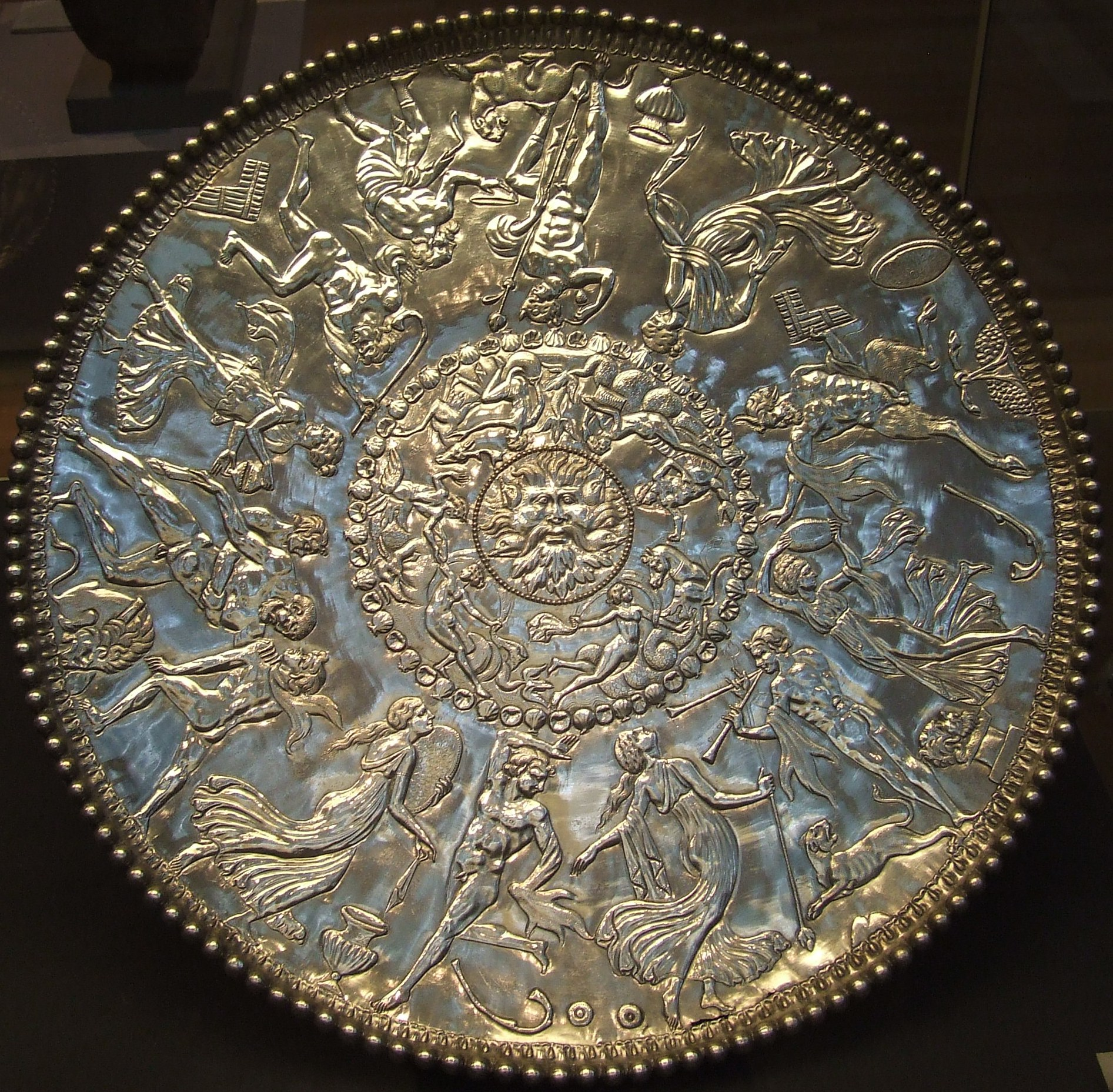
The fourth century "Great Dish" from the Mildenhall Treasure is a fine example of large silver tableware of the sort missing at Hoxne, (Note: "They call it 'the most beautiful object to survive from Roman Britain', although it had been imported. It was perhaps deposited around 360.") although it is believed the owners also would have possessed such pieces.

The Hoxne Hoard comes from the later part of a century (c. 350–450) from which an unusually large number of hoards have been discovered, mostly from the fringes of the Empire. Such hoards vary in character, but many include the large pieces of silver tableware lacking in the Hoxne Hoard: dishes, jugs and ewers, bowls and cups, some plain, but many highly decorated. Two other major hoards discovered in modern East Anglia in the last century are from the fourth century; both are now in the British Museum. The Mildenhall Treasure from Suffolk consists of thirty items of silver tableware deposited in the late fourth century, many large and elaborately decorated, such as the "Great Dish". The Water Newton Treasure from Cambridgeshire is smaller, but is the earliest hoard to have a clearly Christian character, apparently belonging to a church or chapel; the assorted collection probably includes items made in Britain. The Kaiseraugst Treasure from the site at Augusta Raurica in modern Switzerland (now in Basel) contained 257 items, including a banqueting service with sophisticated decoration. The Esquiline Treasure, found in Rome, evidently came from a wealthy Roman family of the late fourth century, and includes several large items, including the "Casket of Projecta". Most of the Esquiline Treasure is in the British Museum, as are bowls and dishes from the Carthage Treasure which belonged to a known family in Roman Africa around 400.

The Mildenhall, Kaiseraugst, and Esquiline treasures contain large items of tableware. Other hoards, such as those found at Thetford and Beaurains, consist mostly of coins, jewellery, and small tableware items; these two hoards probably are pagan votive offerings. A hoard from Traprain Law in Scotland contains decorated Roman silver pieces cut up and folded, showing regard for the value of their metal alone, and may represent loot from a raid.

=== Local context ===
Hoxne, where the hoard was discovered, is located in Suffolk in modern-day East Anglia. Although no large, aristocratic villa has been located in the Hoxne area, there was a Roman settlement nearby from the first through fourth centuries at Scole, about 3.2 km (2.0 mi) north–west of Hoxne, at the intersection of two Roman roads. One of these, Pye Road, (today's A140), linked Venta Icenorum (Caistor St Edmund) to Camulodunum (Colchester) and Londinium (London).

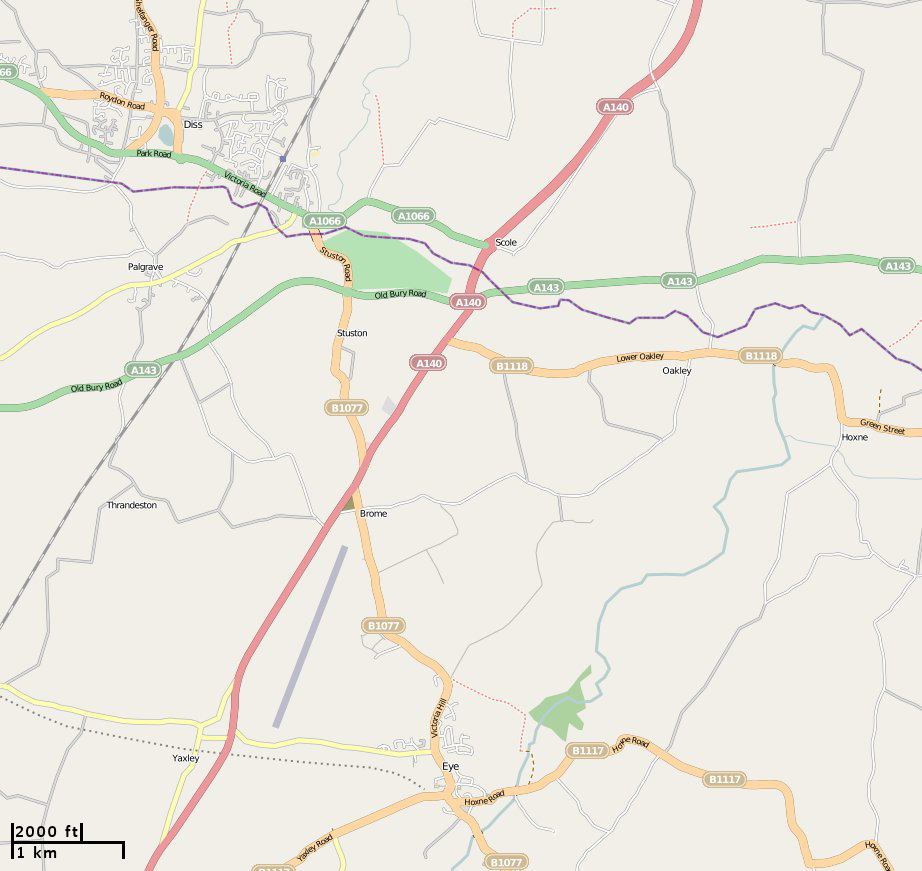
Near to the hoard are a Roman settlement at Scole and an earlier hoard at Eye; the major road in red follows the route of an older Roman Road (Pye Road).

The field in which the hoard was discovered was shown by the 1994 excavation to probably have been cleared by the early Bronze Age, when it began to be used for agriculture and settlement. Some settlement activity occurred near the hoard findspot by the first half of the first millennium BC, but there is no evidence of Roman buildings in the immediate vicinity. The field where the hoard was deposited may have been in cultivation during the early phase of the Roman period but the apparent absence of fourth-century coins suggests that it may have been converted to pasture or else had reverted to woodland by that time.

The Hoxne Hoard is not the only cache of Roman treasure to have been discovered in the area. In 1781 labourers unearthed a lead box by the river at Clint Farm in Eye, 4.8 km (3.0 mi) south of Scole and 3.2 km (2.0 mi) south–west of Hoxne. The box contained about 600 Roman gold coins dating to the reigns of Valens and Valentinian I (reigned 364–375), Gratian (375–383), Theodosius I (378–395), Arcadius (395–408), and Honorius (393–423). At that time this was the largest hoard of Roman gold coins ever discovered in Britain, but the coins were dispersed during the 18th and 19th centuries and cannot now easily be identified in coin collections. As a result, the relationship (if any) between the Eye hoard and that in Hoxne cannot be determined, even if the proximity suggests they may have been related.

Soon after the Hoxne Hoard was discovered there was speculation, based on the name "Faustinus" engraved on one of the spoons, that it may have come from the "Villa Faustini" that is recorded in Itinerary V of the Antonine Itinerary. The exact location of Villa Faustini is unknown, but as it was the first station after Colchester, it is believed to have been somewhere on the Pye Road (modern A140) and one of the possible locations for it is the modern village of Scole, only a couple of miles from Hoxne. This early theory has since been rejected, however, because "Faustinus" was historically a common name, and it only occurs on a single spoon in the hoard. Furthermore, the logic of using inscriptions on individual items in the hoard to determine ownership of the hoard as a whole is considered flawed. Based on the dating of the coins in the hoard, the majority of which belong to the period 394–405, it also has been speculated that the contents of the hoard originally belonged to a military family that accompanied Count Theodosius to Britain in 368–369, and which may have left with Constantine III in 407.

== Acquisition, display, and impact ==
The hoard was acquired by the British Museum in April 1994. As the Museum's entire purchase fund amounted to only £1.4 million at the time, the hoard had to be purchased with the assistance of donors that included the National Heritage Memorial Fund, the National Art Collections Fund (now the Art Fund), and the J. Paul Getty Trust. The grants from these and other benefactors enabled the museum to raise the £1.75 million needed for the acquisition.

Items from the hoard have been on display almost continuously since the treasure was received at the British Museum. Some items were displayed at the Museum as early as September 1993 in response to public interest. Much of the hoard was exhibited at Ipswich Museum in 1994–1995. From 1997, the most important items went on permanent display at the British Museum in a new and enlarged Roman Britain gallery (Room 49), alongside the roughly contemporary Thetford Hoard, and adjacent to the Mildenhall Treasure, which contains large silver vessels of types that are absent from the Hoxne Hoard. Some items from the Hoxne Hoard were included in Treasure: Finding Our Past, a touring exhibition that was shown in five cities in England and Wales in 2003. A perspex reconstruction of the chest and inner boxes in which it was deposited was created for this tour, showing the arrangement of the different types of items with sample items inside. It is now part of the permanent display in London, along with other items laid out more traditionally.

The first comprehensive research on the Hoard was published in the full catalogue of the coins by Peter Guest in 2005, and the catalogue of the other objects by Catherine Johns in 2010. The hoard was third in the list of British archaeological finds selected by experts at the British Museum for the 2003 BBC Television documentary Our Top Ten Treasures, which included archive footage of its finder, Eric Lawes, and the "Empress" pepper-pot was selected as item 40 in the 2010 BBC Radio 4 series A History of the World in 100 Objects.

The discovery and excavation of the Hoxne Hoard improved the relationship between the archaeological profession and the community of metal detectorists. Archaeologists were pleased that Lawes reported the find promptly and largely undisturbed, allowing a professional excavation. Metal detectorists noted that Lawes' efforts were appreciated by the archaeological profession. The Treasure Act 1996 is thought to have contributed to more hoards being made available to archaeologists. The act changed the law so that the owner of the land and the person who finds the hoard have a strong stake in the value of the discovery. The manner of the finding of the Hoxne Hoard by metal detector, and its widespread publicity, contributed to changing the previous system of common law for dealing with treasure trove into a statutory legal framework that takes into account technology such as metal detectors, provides incentives for treasure hunters to report finds, and considers the interests of museums and scholars.

== See also ==
- Romano-British culture
- Lava Treasure
- Trier Gold Hoard

== Notes ==
Preceded by 39: Admonitions Scroll	A History of the World in 100 Objects; Object 40	Succeeded by 41: Seated Buddha from Gandhara
