= Apostle spoon =

Spoon with an image of an apostle or other saint as the termination of the handle

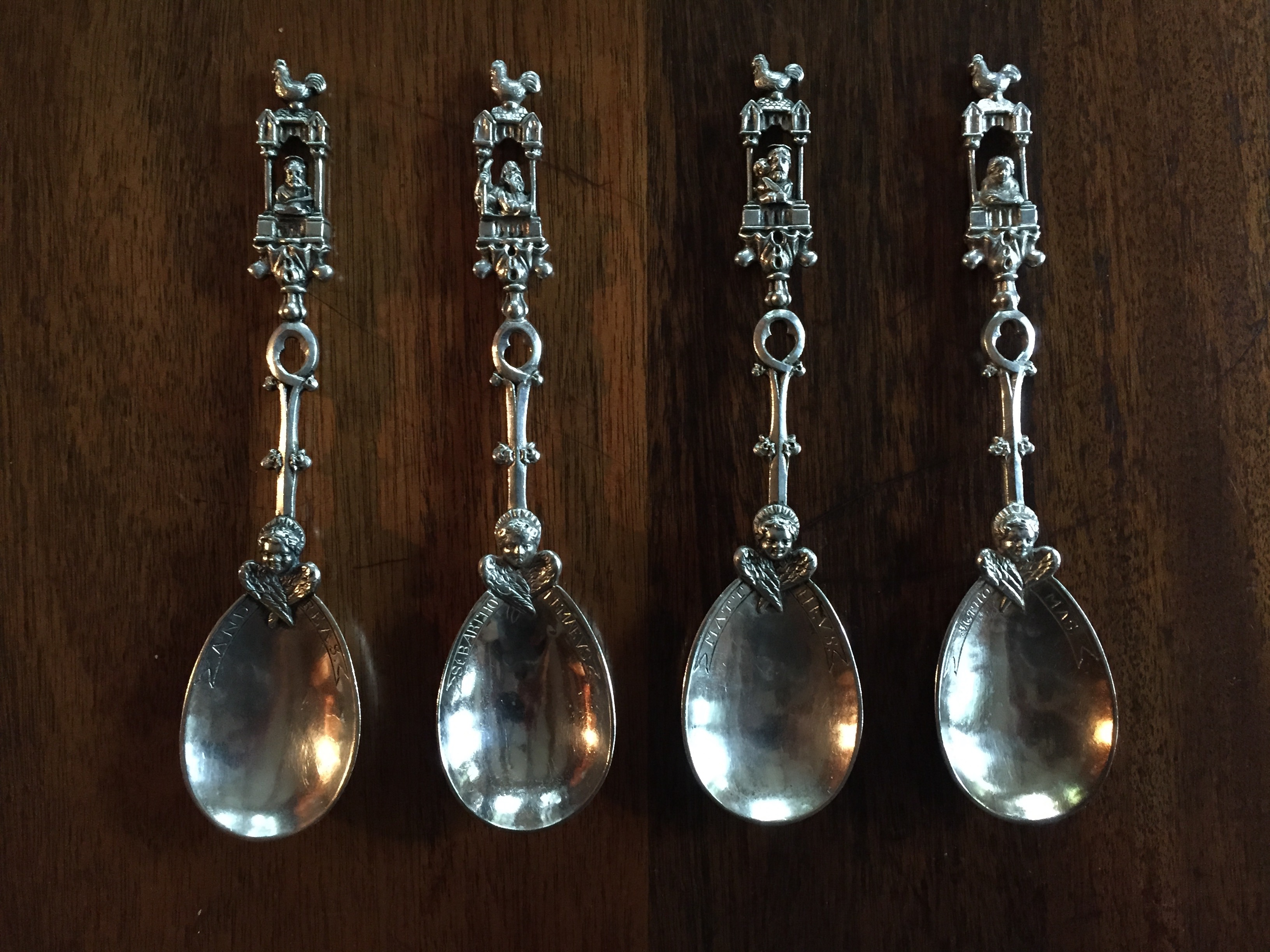
Apostle Spoons - L to R - Andrew, Bartholomew, Matthew, Thomas

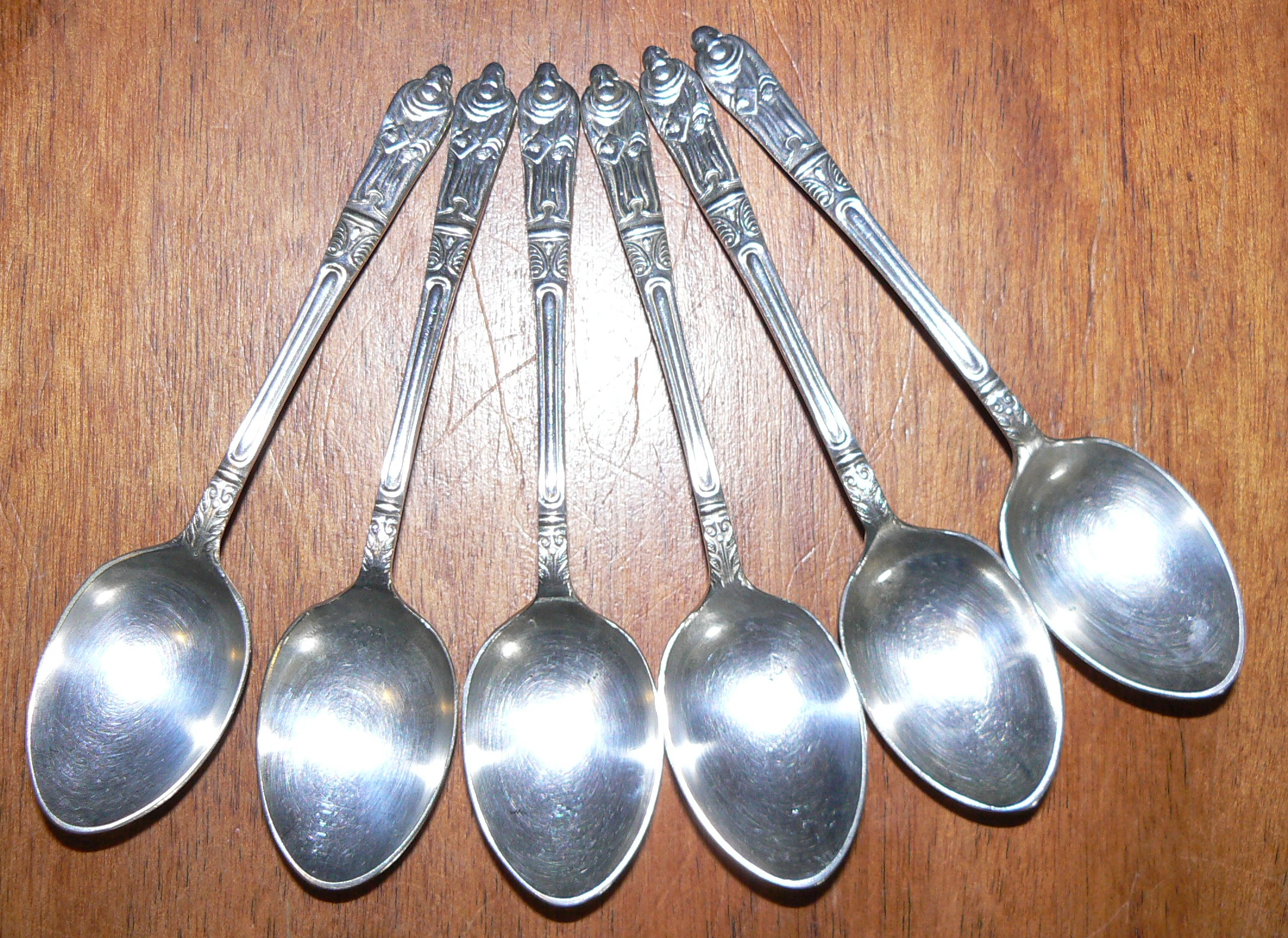
A set of Apostle spoons

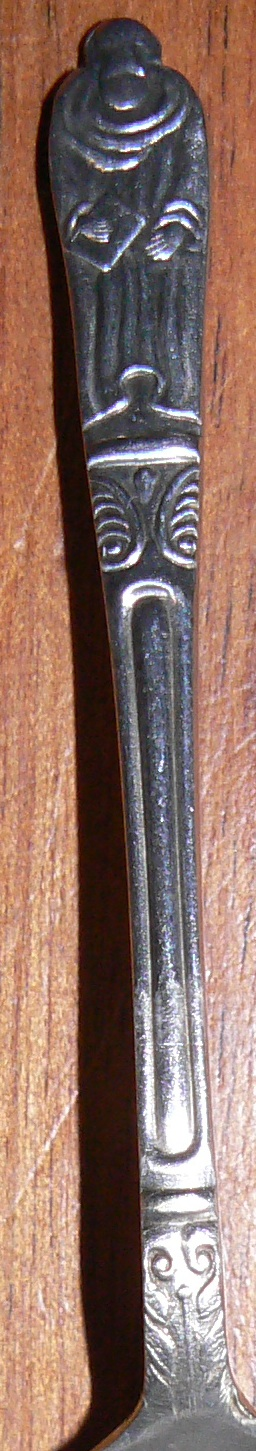
The handle of an Apostle spoon

An apostle spoon is a spoon (usually silver or silver-plated, but sometimes of other metals, such as pewter) with an image of an apostle or other saint as the terminal of the handle, each bearing his distinctive emblem. Apostle spoons were particularly popular prior to the Reformation. They symbolize the Last Supper of Christ in the company of the Apostles. Apostle spoons were especially popular in England, but were also found in large numbers in Germany.

== Origins ==
Originating in early-fifteenth century in Europe as spoons used at table (often produced in sets of thirteen, the thirteenth, showing Jesus, usually being referred to as the 'Saviour' or 'Master' spoon). The British Museum in London has a set from England dating from 1536–7 which has a figure of the Virgin Mary on the thirteenth spoon. By the sixteenth century they had become popular as baptismal presents for godchildren, but were dying out by the 1660s. In some communities this tradition continued until at least the mid-twentieth century.

They first appeared as a bequest in the will of one Amy Brent who, in 1516, bequeathed "XIII sylver spones of J' hu and the XII Apostells." They are alluded to by the dramatists Ben Jonson, Thomas Middleton, Francis Beaumont, and John Fletcher. Shakespeare refers to it in Henry VIII, Act 5, Scene 3, where Cranmer declines to be sponsor for the infant Elizabeth because of his lack of money. King Henry banters him with "Come, come, my lord, you'ld spare your spoons."

Sets of the twelve apostles are not common, and complete sets of thirteen, with the figure of Jesus on a larger spoon, are still rarer.

The spoon shown opposite is typical of single spoons not part of a set. In this case the apostle is simply holding what appears to be a book. Such examples would typically be in electroplated nickel silver and marked on the rear face with "EPNS."

Typically, the bowls were hammered, stem forged onto the bowl, figurines cast and soldered onto the stem.

== Baptismal gift ==
Possession of a silver spoon in the 16th century was a sign of prosperity. Holinshed remarked that in the "spacious times of great Elizabeth", farmers were exchanging "woode spoons into silver". It became customary in England for a godparent to gift a silver baptismal spoon to the child at their baptism, giving the rise to the "Apostle" spoons. The Continental Europe had similar customs, yet usually with simpler spoons. Veitch speculated that a well-to-do participant was expected to provide a set of baptismal spoons, based on Shakespeare's "Come, come, my lord, you'd spare your spoons" ("Henry VIII", where Henry is inviting Thomas Cranmer to baptize princess Elizabeth). The spoons were marketed and gifted as individual items, very few full sets (of 13 spoons) are known. In addition to hallmarks on the stem, the bowl was frequently marked by name (or initials) and date (commonly "pricked" using the dots made with a sharp needle).

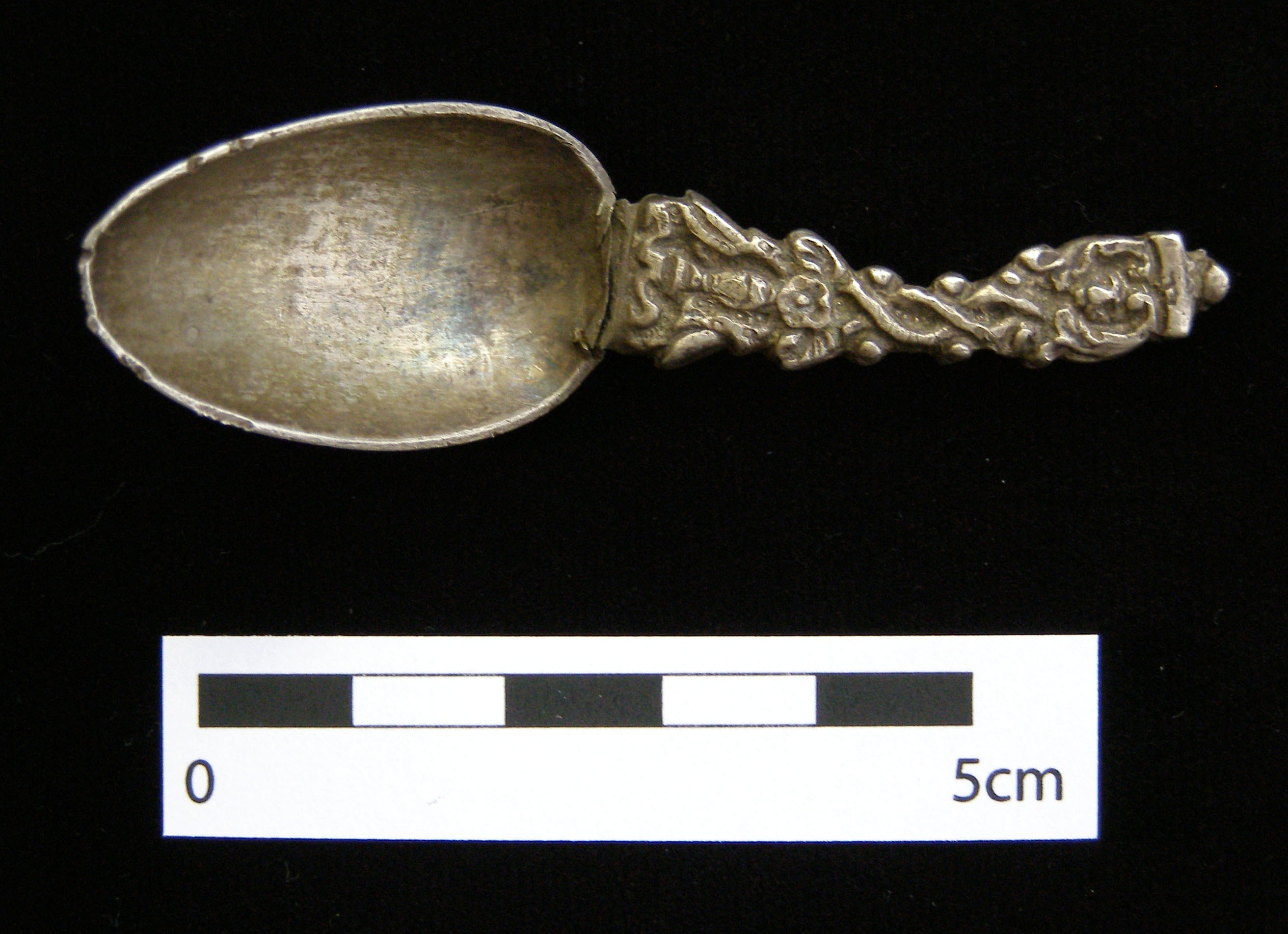
Christening spoon (17th-18th centuries)

The tradition of giving an engraved silver spoon as a christening spoon originated in old rural societies, with families quickly investing saved money into silver items, a spoon being the preferred choice that had a dual advantage: the silver held lasting monetary value, and the item could be proudly displayed to family, friends, and neighbors as a symbol of status. Historically, these christening gifts were presented to the family by godparents and the extended family during a special feast held in connection with the baptism (cf. Swedish: barnsöl, "child beer"). Today, the financial equivalent of gifting a silver spoon is opening a savings account for the newborn, yet old traditions persist, and a baptismal spoon is sometimes gifted alongside a modern bank deposit.

The phrase "born with a silver spoon in his mouth" (i.e., into a rich family) most likely alludes to the baptismal spoon.

== Attributes ==
The identity of the Apostle can be known by the attribute mentioned in the following list:

- 1 the Master: cross and orb
- 2 Saint Peter: a sword or a key, sometimes a fish
- 3 Saint Andrew: a cross
- 4 Saint James the Greater: a pilgrim's staff
- 5 St. John: the cup of sorrow
- 6 Saint Philip: a staff
- 7 Saint Bartholomew: a knife
- 8 Saint Thomas: a spar
- 9 Saint Matthew: an axe or halberd
- 10 Saint James the Lesser: a fuller's bat
- 11 Saint Jude: a carpenter's set square
- 12 Saint Simon Zealotes: a long saw
- 13 Judas Iscariot: a bag of money. Saint Paul, sometimes used as a substitute for Judas: a sword.

== References and sources ==
Sources:

- Burgess, F.W. (1921). Silver: Pewter: Sheffield Plate. Home connoisseur series. G. Routledge.
- Martenius, Ingela (December 1, 2007). "Birth, baptism and churching". Swedish American Genealogist. 27 (4): 14–17.
- Smith, Chrysti Mueller (2015-09-12). "Born with a Silver Spoon". Verbivore's Feast: Second Course: More Word & Phrase Origins. Farcountry Press. ISBN 978-1-56037-530-2.
- Veitch, Henry Newton (December 1911). "English Domestic Spoons-I". The Burlington Magazine for Connoisseurs. 20 (105). Burlington Magazine: 153–157, 161. JSTOR 858794.
