= Silver spoon =

Idiom

The English language expression silver spoon is synonymous with wealth, especially inherited wealth; someone born into a wealthy family is said to have "been born with a silver spoon in their mouth". As an adjective, "silver spoon" describes someone who has a prosperous background or is of a well-to-do family environment, often with the connotation that the person does not fully realize or appreciate the value of their advantage, its having been inherited rather than earned, hence the Australian (esp. SA) term spooner for a young person so advantaged.

== History ==
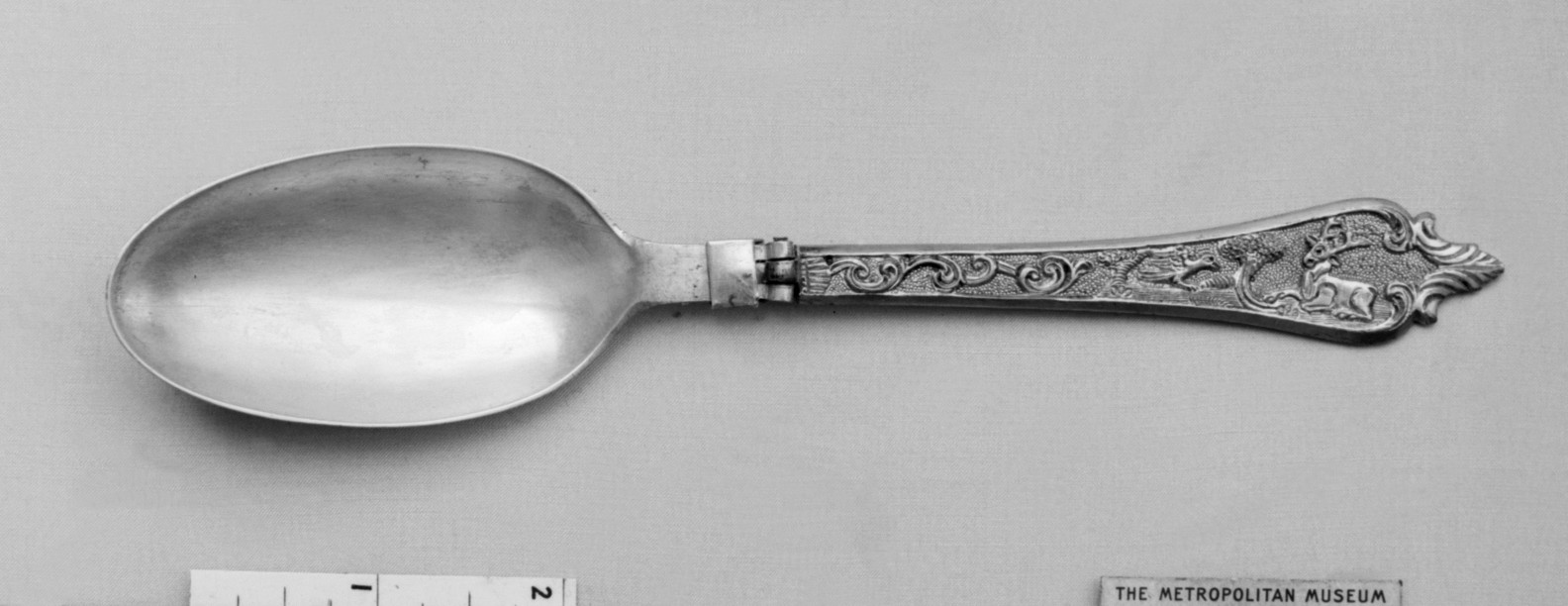
Folding silver spoon, 18th century

In the 16th century, possession of a silver spoon was a sign of relative prosperity. Holinshed remarked that in the "spacious times of great Elizabeth", farmers were exchanging "woode spoons into silver". It became customary in England for a godparent to gift a silver baptismal spoon to the child at their baptism.

The phrase "born with a silver spoon in his mouth" appeared in print in English as early as 1712, in Peter Anthony Motteux's translation of the novel Don Quixote: "Mum, Teresa, quoth Sancho, 'tis not all Gold that glisters [sic], and every Man was not born with a Silver Spoon in his Mouth." Because the phrase is used as a translation of a Spanish proverb with a different literal meaning (Spanish: muchas veces donde hay estacas no hay tocinos, literally: "often where there are hooks [for hanging hams] there are no hams"), it seems that the phrase was already considered proverbial in English at the time.

The phrase next appears in a book of Scottish proverbs published in 1721, in the form "Every Man is not born with a Silver Spoon in his Mouth."

An earlier English version from 1639 used a "penny" in the mouth instead of a spoon.

== Variants ==
There are similar expressions in other languages. For example, in Portuguese and Spanish, an expression translated as "born in a gold cradle" is equivalent to the English, "born with a silver spoon".

The term gold spoon is much less commonly used, but finds occasional use, such as the 1840 American Gold Spoon Oration criticizing then-president Martin Van Buren for his supposedly luxurious lifestyle. In some languages, like Swedish and Finnish, the common expression is gold spoon rather than silver spoon, although both can be used.

"Silver fork novels" are described by English professor Paola Brunetti to her husband Guido, in Donna Leon's fourth Commissario Guido Brunetti novel Death and Judgment aka A Venetian Reckoning (1995), chapter 22, as "books written in the eighteenth century, when all that money poured into England from the colonies, and the fat wives of Yorkshire weavers had to be taught which fork to use".

== See also ==
- Apostle spoon
- Born in the purple
- Cignus
- Cochlearium
- Silver lining (idiom)
- Silver tongue
- Spoon class theory

== Sources ==
- Smith, Chrysti Mueller (2015-09-12). "Born with a Silver Spoon". Verbivore's Feast: Second Course: More Word & Phrase Origins. Farcountry Press. ISBN 978-1-56037-530-2.
- Veitch, Henry Newton (December 1911). "English Domestic Spoons-I". The Burlington Magazine for Connoisseurs. 20 (105). Burlington Magazine: 153–157, 161. JSTOR 858794.
