= Cochlearium =

Roman spoon

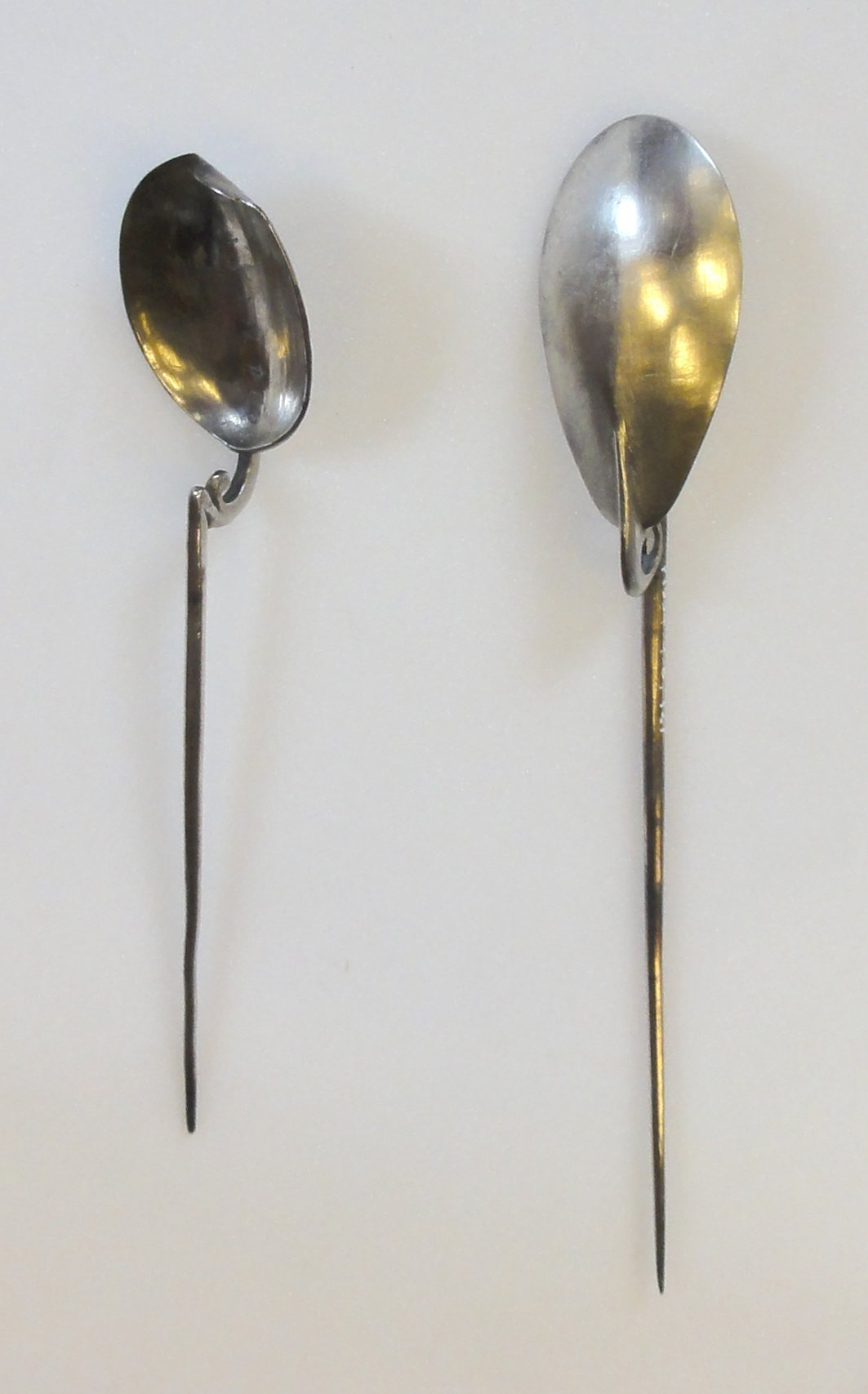
Two silver cochlearia from the Hoxne Hoard

A cochlearium (plural cochlearia) was a small Roman spoon with a long tapering handle.

== History ==
Cochlearia have been found in a number of Roman sites from the 4th and 5th centuries CE, including the Thetford and Hoxne Hoards.

The word cochlea literally means spiral or snail shell, leading many to conclude that the spoon was designed so that the handle could be used to extract snails or cockles out of the shell.

The Roman terms cochlearium, cochlear, and cochleare denote a liquid measure of a spoonful. A cochlearium was also a place where snails could be bred for eating.

In modern times, the cochlearium is used by boat bearers in the Latin Rite of the Catholic Church to transfer incense from the "boat" (navicula in Latin) to the thurible.

== See also ==
- Cignus
- Silver spoon
- Cochlea, the spiral-shaped part of the human inner ear
