= Cignus =

Type of Roman Empire metal spoon

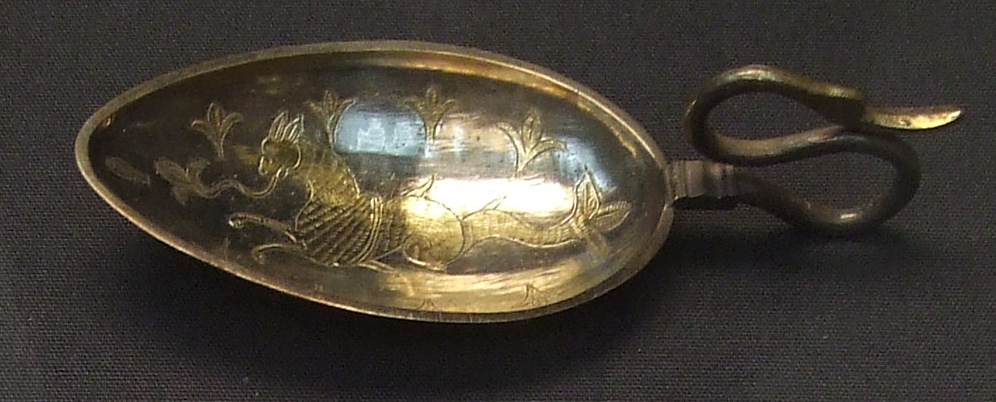
Silver-gilt cignus spoon with a bird-headed handle and bowl decorated with a mythical marine creature. 4th century CE from the Hoxne Hoard

Cignus (Latin: cygnus, meaning 'swan'; pl. cigni) is a name used by archaeologists for a type of large Roman metal spoon with a short, curved, handle often formed as the neck and head of a swan. Cigni have been found in a number of Roman sites from the 4th and 5th centuries CE, including the Thetford and Hoxne Hoards in England. It is not known for certain what the Romans called these utensils, but there are references to cigni in Roman sources in appropriate contexts.

== See also ==
- Cochlearium
- Silver spoon
