= List of Roman hoards in Great Britain =

The list of Roman hoards in Britain comprises significant archaeological hoards of coins, jewellery, precious and scrap metal objects and other valuable items discovered in Great Britain (England, Scotland and Wales) that are associated with period of Romano-British culture when Southern Britain was under the control of the Roman Empire, from AD 43 until about 410, as well as the subsequent Sub-Roman period up to the establishment of Anglo-Saxon kingdoms. It includes both hoards that were buried with the intention of retrieval at a later date (personal hoards, founder's hoards, merchant's hoards, and hoards of loot), and also hoards of votive offerings which were not intended to be recovered at a later date, but excludes grave goods and single items found in isolation.

Most Roman hoards are composed largely or entirely of coins, and are relatively common in Britain, with over 1,200 known examples. A smaller number of hoards, such as the Mildenhall Treasure and the Hoxne Hoard, include items of silver or gold tableware such as dishes, bowls, jugs and spoons, or items of silver or gold jewellery.

== List of hoards ==
Hoard	Image	Date	Place of discovery	Year of discovery	Current location	Contents
Acton Hoard	The Acton votive hoard	late 2nd century	Acton; Cheshire; 53.073°N 2.548°W	2014	Nantwich Museum	Votive hoard of five silver denarii of the emperor Septimius Severus (AD 193–211) in a lead alloy conical container with a lead alloy disc stopper.
Agden Hoard		late 3rd century	Woolstencroft Farm, Agden; Cheshire; 53.381°N 2.420°W	1957	Grosvenor Museum, Chester	About 2,500 antoniniani and the lower half of jar
Aldbury Hoard		late 3rd century	near Aldbury; Hertfordshire; 51.808°N 0.594°W	1870		116 brass coins fragments of brass plate half a brass ring silver wire ring 2 brooches
Alton Barnes Hoard		late 3rd century	Alton Barnes; Wiltshire; 51.359°N 1.846°W	2005	Wiltshire Museum, Devizes	3,854 silver and bronze Roman coins
Appleford Hoard		late 4th/early 5th century	Appleford-on-Thames; Oxfordshire; 51.6382°N 1.2529°W	1968	Ashmolean Museum, Oxford	24 pewter vessels, together with iron objects and tools
Appleshaw Hoard		4th century	Appleshaw; Hampshire; 51.227°N 1.5692°W	1897	British Museum, London	32 pewter vessels, some marked with Christian symbols
Backworth Hoard		late 2nd century	Backworth; Tyne and Wear; 55.037°N 1.524°W	1811	British Museum, London	Silver skillet covered by silver mirror, 5 gold rings, silver serpent ring, 2 gold chains with wheel and crescent pendants, silver-gilt brooches, 1 gold bracelet, silver spoons, 280 denarii, brass coins, silver dish
Baldock Hoard	Votive plaques from the Baldock Hoard	3rd to 4th century	near Baldock; Hertfordshire; 51.990°N 0.189°W	2002	British Museum, London	26 gold and silver objects including gold jewellery, 7 gold votive plaques, 12 silver votive plaques, two silver model arms, and a silver figurine
Barkway Hoard	Votive plaques from the Barkway Hoard	early 3rd century	near Barkway; Hertfordshire; 52.004°N 0.001°E	1743	British Museum, London	5 silver and bronze objects, including one silver-gilt votive plaque dedicated to Mars, and two silver votive plaques dedicated to Vulcan
Barlaston Hoard		276 AD	Barlaston	2015		2015 Roman coins and other objects
Beau Street Hoard		second half of 3rd century	Bath; Somerset; 51.3804°N 2.3604°W	2008	Roman Baths Museum, Bath	30,000 silver Roman coins
Beckfoot Hoard		Unknown	Beckfoot, near Silloth; Cumbria; 54.820°N 3.410°W	2010		308 Roman coins in a pot
Beech Bottom Dyke Hoard		early 2nd century	Beech Bottom Dyke, St Albans; Hertfordshire; 51.769°N 0.326°W	1932	Dispersed	About 100 silver denarii
Binnington Carr Hoard	Binnington Carr Hoard	AD74-75	Binnington Carr near Willerby, North Yorkshire; 54.1981°N 0.44659°W	c. 1876	Yorkshire Museum	12 silver denarii
Bishopswood Hoard		mid-4th century	Bishopswood, near Walford, Ross-on-Wye; Herefordshire; 51.870°N 2.585°W	1895	Hereford Museum and Art Gallery	17,548 coins
Blake Street Hoard		late-1st-century	York; North Yorkshire; 53.961°N 1.084°W	1975	Yorkshire Museum; British Museum	35 silver denarii, the latest of Vespasian.
Boldre Hoard		late 3rd century	Boldre; Hampshire; 50.7821°N 1.5533°W	2014	St Barbe Museum & Art Gallery, Lymington	1,608 base silver radiates
Boothstown Hoard		late 3rd century	Boothstown; Greater Manchester; 53.502°N 2.420°W	1947	British Museum, London; Manchester Museum	550 bronze coins dated between 259 and 278 AD found in two pottery urns
Boston Spa hoard	The grey ware vessel from the hoard	mid 2nd century	Boston Spa; West Yorkshire; 53.900°N 1.334°W	1848	Yorkshire Museum	172 silver denarii in a grey ware vessel
Bottesford hoard		2nd century	Bottesford, Lincolnshire	–	North Lincolnshire Museum	165 silver denarii and greyware vessel
Braithwell Hoard		late 3rd century	Braithwell; South Yorkshire; 53.444°N 1.203°W	2002	British Museum (4); Doncaster Museum (1)	1,331 base silver radiates 1 base metal denarius 13 sherds of greyware jar
Breamore hoards		late 3rd century	Breamore; Hampshire; 50.96°N 1.77°W	1998 (B)	Returned to finder (B)	Hoard A: 1,782 base silver radiates Hoard B:398 base silver radiates and pot
Bredon Hill Hoard	Roman coins from the Bredon Hill Hoard	mid-4th century	Bredon Hill; Worcestershire; 52.060°N 2.063°W	2011	Worcestershire County Museum, Hartlebury Castle	3,784 debased silver coins in a clay pot
Burgh Castle Hoard		3rd century	Burgh Castle; Norfolk; 52.5826°N 1.6515°E	1958–1961		Glass vessels and a copper alloy bell placed in a bronze bowl, all within an iron-bound bucket.
Canterbury Treasure	Items from the Canterbury Treasure on display in the local Roman Museum	early 5th century	Canterbury; Kent; 51.278°N 1.094°E	1962	Roman Museum, Canterbury	12 silver spoons, 3 ingots, 1 tooth pick and jewellery
Capheaton Treasure	Silver vessel handle from the Capheaton Treasure	2nd or 3rd century	Capheaton; Northumberland; 55.124°N 1.947°W	1747	British Museum, London	5 silver vessel handles, and 1 fragment of a silver trulla base
Castlethorpe Hoard		mid-2nd century	Castlethorpe; Buckinghamshire; 52.093°N 0.840°E	c. 1827	British Museum, London	Coins, a pair of silver snakeshead bracelets (both inscribed undearneath), silver finger ring with carnelian intaglio. Found within a ceramic jar.
Chaddesley Corbett Hoard		early 4th century	Chaddesley Corbett; Worcestershire; 52.360°N 2.159°W	1999 and 2003	Worcestershire County Museum, Hartlebury Castle	434 base silver nummi 38 sherds of pottery
Chalgrove hoards	The Chalgrove II hoard	late 3rd century	Chalgrove; Oxfordshire; 51.664°N 1.083°W	1989 (I); 2003 (II)	Ashmolean Museum, Oxford (2003)	I: 4,145 coins II: 4,957 base silver coins
Charnwood Forest Hoard	1852 etching of the Charnwood Forest Hoard by George Cruikshank	mid-3rd century	Mount St Bernard Abbey, Charnwood Forest; Leicestershire; 52.740°N 1.310°W	1840		Large number of bronze coins, some dating between 254 and 268, in an urn
Chells Manor Hoard		late 3rd century	Chells Manor Estate, Stevenage; Hertfordshire; 51.918°N 0.160°W	1986		2,579 coins
Chilbolton Down Hoard	Coins and pot of the Chilbolton Down Hoard	early 4th century	Chilbolton Down; Hampshire; 51.130°N 1.415°W	c. 1952	Winchester City Museum	Bronze and silver coins dated 306–337 in a pot
Chilfrome Hoard		ca. 47 AD	Chilfrome, Dorset 50.7878°N 2.5862°W	2021		97 denarii
Chorleywood Hoard		mid-4th century	Chorleywood; Hertfordshire; 51.645°N 0.518°W	1977	British Museum (244); Verulamium Museum, St Albans (446)	4,358 coins
Clapton Hoard		late 3rd century	Clapton in Gordano; Somerset; 51.460°N 2.765°W	1922–1924	Museum of Somerset, Taunton (59) and Nicholson Museum, Sydney, Australia (over 3400)	3500 Roman bronze coins, (mainly Gallienus to Claudius II)
Cookley Hoard		mid 1st century	Cookley; Suffolk; 52.325°N 1.445°E	2018		58 silver denarii and two silver-plated fake denarii, dating between 153 BC and AD 61
Corbridge Hoard (1911)	Corbridge hoard on display at the British Museum	150	Corbridge; Northumberland; 54.978°N 2.033°W	1911	British Museum	160 gold aureus coins in a bronze jug, with two bronze coins in the neck of the jug to disguise the worth of contents.
Corbridge Hoard (1964)		150	Corbridge; Northumberland; 54.978°N 2.033°W	1964	Corbridge Roman Site Museum; Great North Museum, Newcastle upon Tyne	Various finished and unfinished iron products, including pieces of armour, a sword scabbard, javelinheads, spearheads, arrowheads, artillery bolts, and various knives, nails, spikes and cramps
Corbridge Treasure	The Corbridge lanx	300	Corbridge; Northumberland; 54.971°N 2.016°W	1731–1760	British Museum, London	5 pieces of silverware, including a lanx (serving platter), a bowl and a vase
Cridling Stubbs Hoard (also known as Womersley I)		346	Cridling Stubbs; North Yorkshire; 53.683°N 1.213°W	1967	Leeds City Museum (447 coins)	More than 3,300 bronze nummi coins in a grey-ware jar with a makeshift lid
Cunetio Hoard		275	Cunetio Roman town, Mildenhall; Wiltshire; 51.423°N 1.690°W	1978	British Museum, London	54,951 coins
Curridge Hoard		209	Curridge; Berkshire; 51.444°N 1.292°W	1998–1999	West Berkshire Heritage	425 bronze sestertius or dupondii/asses
Dairsie Hoard		290	Dairsie; Fife; 56.345°N 2.945°W	2014	National Museum of Scotland, Edinburgh	More than 300 pieces of hacksilver from at least four silver Roman vessels
Deepdale Hoard		390	Deepdale, Lincolnshire	1979	North Lincolnshire Museum	260 silver siliquae
Didcot Hoard		late 2nd century	Didcot; Oxfordshire; 51.606°N 1.240°W	1995	British Museum, London	126 gold coins
Drapers' Gardens Hoard		Late fourth or early fifth century	Drapers' Gardens, City of London	2007	Museum of London, London	15 copper-alloy vessels, 3 lead/tin alloy vessels, 2 iron vessels, a broken copper-alloy bracelet, 2 nummi and an iron bucket binding, along with the remains of a juvenile deer. Found in a well.
Edge Hill Hoard		mid-1st century	Edge Hill; Warwickshire; 52.120°N 1.475°W	2008	Market Hall Museum, Warwick	1,146 silver denarii in a small pot, coins dating between 190 BC and AD 63–64
Ethy Hoard		late 3rd century	Ethy, near Lerryn; Cornwall; 50.385°N 4.627°W	2000	Royal Cornwall Museum, Truro	1,095 base silver radiates coarseware jar
Esclusham Hoard		late 1st century	Esclusham; Wrexham; 53.034°N 3.067°W	2016		82 silver denarii dating to the reigns of Augustus, Nero, Galba, Vitellius and Vespasian in a red pot
Eye Hoard		late 4th century	Near Eye, Suffolk; Suffolk; 52.299°N 1.140°E	1781		600 gold coins
Felmingham Hall Hoard		2nd to 3rd centuries	near Felmingham; Norfolk; 52.814648°N 1.339601°E	1845	British Museum, London	Romano-British temple treasure consisting of a pottery bowl, a buckle, a rattle, heads of Jupiter and Minerva, a mask of Sol with sun rays, a lar or household god, a wheel associated with the Celtic god Taranis, two statuettes of birds
Fenwick Hoard		61AD	Colchester; Essex	2014	Colchester Castle	2 pairs of gold earrings, 1 gold bracelet, 2 gold armlets, 5 gold finger-rings, 1 silver chain and loop, 1 copper-alloy bulla, 1 silver armlet, 2 silver cuff bracelets, 1 glass intaglio, Roman republican coins, remains of a silver pyxis (jewellery box).
Frampton Hoard		late 3rd century	Frampton; Dorset; 50.754°N 2.532°W	1998	Returned to finder	511 base silver radiates and pot
Fremington Hagg Hoard	One of the harness fittings from the Fremington Hagg hoard	late 1st century	Fremington Hagg, Reeth; North Yorkshire	pre-1833	British Museum and Yorkshire Museum	Several hundred pieces of horse-gear, including mounts and strap fittings.
Frome Hoard	Pile of coins from the Frome Hoard	early 4th century	Near Frome; Somerset; 51.228°N 2.280°W	2010	Museum of Somerset, Taunton	52,503 coins (5 silver, the rest debased silver and bronze)
Gloucester Hoard		early 1st century	Gloucester; Gloucestershire; 51.875°N 2.285°W	2017		8 silver denarii dated 134BC – AD37
Grassmoor Hoard		4th century	Grassmoor; Derbyshire; 53.201°N 1.397°W	2001	Chesterfield Museum and British Museum, London	1,421 silver coins
Hayle Hoard (1825)		late 3rd century	Hayle; Cornwall; 50.1824°N 5.4297°W	1825	Royal Cornwall Museum, Truro	Several thousand radiates in a copper bowl
Hayle Hoard (2017)		late 3rd century	Hayle; Cornwall; 50.180°N 5.415°W	2017		1,965 base silver radiates with the remains of a tin container and a lead stopper, found in a stone-lined pit
Heslington Hoard		4th century	Heslington; North Yorkshire; 53.949°N 1.050°W	1966	Yorkshire Museum	2,800 coins
Helmingham Hall Hoard		circa 47 AD	Helmingham Hall Suffolk	2019-2021		748 coins (14 Celtic gold staters, 3 quarter staters, 1 Aureus, the rest denarii)
Hickleton Hoard		late 2nd century	Hickleton; South Yorkshire; 53.533°N 1.283°W	2001	Doncaster Museum	350 silver coins 36 copper-alloy coins
High Green Hoard		late 3rd century	High Green; South Yorkshire; 53.473°N 1.494°W	2001		738 base silver radiates
High Weald Hoard		3rd century	Burwash; West Sussex	2006	Brighton Museum & Art Gallery	2894 silver coins
Hockwold Hoard (1962)	Silver cups from the Hockwold Hoard	late 1st century	Hockwold cum Wilton; Norfolk; 52.465°N 0.542°E	1962	British Museum, London	4 silver cups 4 silver handles 1 silver pedestal
Hockwold Hoard (1999)		mid-4th century	Hockwold cum Wilton; Norfolk; 52.465°N 0.542°E	1999	British Museum, London	816 copper alloy coins
Howe Hoard		late 1st century	Howe; Norfolk; 52.551°N 1.356°E	1981–2002	British Museum, London	15 gold aurei 131 silver denarii
Hoxne Hoard	Reconstruction of the chest containing the Hoxne Hoard	early 5th century	Hoxne; Suffolk; 52.330°N 1.183°E	1992	British Museum, London	14,865 coins (569 gold, 14,272 silver, 24 bronze); 29 items of gold jewellery 98 silver spoons and ladles 1 silver tigress 4 silver bowls 1 small dish 1 silver beaker 1 silver vase or juglet 4 pepper pots
Huntingdon Muddy Hoard		274 AD	Huntingdon, Cambridgeshire	2018	British Museum; Norris Museum, St Ives, Cambridgeshire	Pottery shards, (one pot in another) 9724 coins (3 silver denarii, several radiates and antonianianii)
Hyderabad and Meeanee Barracks Hoard		271 AD	Hyderabad and Meeanee Barracks, Colchester; Essex; 51.883°N 0.904°E	2011	Colchester Museum	Two pots, one empty and one containing 1,247 coins
Ibberton Hoard		333 AD	Ibberton	2019	British Museum; rest dispersed in a March 2023 auction by Noonan's	393 nummi and fragments
Inchtuthil Hoard	Eight nails from the Inchtuthil Hoard	late 1st century	Inchtuthil; Perth and Kinross; 56.541°N 3.424°E	1960	Dispersed across various museums and private collections	875,400 iron nails
Itteringham Hoard		late 2nd century	Itteringham; Norfolk; 52.831°N 1.183°E	2000	British Museum, London	3 silver finger rings 2 copper-alloy cosmetic sets 1 bronze key 62 silver denarii 42 copper-alloy coins pot fragments
Killingholme Hoard		first half of 4th century	South Killingholme; Lincolnshire; 53.600°N 0.275°W	1993	Mostly dispersed; 86 in British Museum, London.	3,800 bronze coins dating to reign of Constantine the Great in a pot
Kingston Deverill Hoard	The Kingston Deverill vessels during excavation	late 1st century	Kingston Deverill; Wiltshire; 51.133°N 2.220°W	2005	Salisbury Museum	3 bronze trullei or patera (shallow handled bowls); 2 bronze wine strainers
Kirkham Hoard		mid 3rd century	Kirkham; Lancashire; 53.782°N 2.873°W	1853	Harris Museum, Preston, Lancashire	35 silver denarii and one bronze semis in a Samian ware pot.
Kirton in Lindsey hoards		274	Kirton in Lindsey; Lincolnshire; 53.476°N 0.589°W	1999 (1); 2001, 2004 (2)	6 coins at British Museum, London	Hoard 1: 875 base silver radiates Hoard 2: 111 base silver radiates (2001); 85 base silver radiates (2004)
Knaresborough Hoard		300	Knaresborough; North Yorkshire	1860	Yorkshire Museum	Mixed metalwork. Copper alloy vessels: a large fluted bowl, six hemispherical 'Irchester' type bowls, four strainers with handles, a strainer bowl, a handled pan, two plates, a scale pan, and a large jar in the shape of a pottery vessel. Iron objects in the hoard include two iron axes, an adze, and a smith's cross. Objects accidentally melted down in the 19th century include several other large copper alloy plates, flat plates with handles, other dishes and bowls, a "great quantity" of iron nails, and a fire grate.
Knutsford Hoard	Silver-gilt trumpet brooches from the Knutsford Hoard	late 2nd century	Knutsford; Cheshire53.300°N 2.370°W	2012	Liverpool Museum, Congleton Museum	3 silver-gilt trumpet brooches, 2 silver finger rings, and more than 100 coins which were issued between 32BC to the late 2nd century AD
Langley with Hardley Hoard		late 3rd century	Langley with Hardley; Norfolk; 52.562°N 1.485°E	1997, 1999, 2001, 2004	Returned to finder	2,044 base silver radiates
Langtoft hoards		early 4th century	Langtoft; East Yorkshire; 54.087°N 0.457°W	2000	Yorkshire Museum, York; British Museum, London	Hoard A: 976 base silver coins and 21 sherds of a jar Hoard B: 924 base silver nummi and 9 sherds of a pot
Leominster Hoard (2013)	Radiate of Maximian 1 from the Leominster Hoard	290	Leominster, Herefordshire; 52.230°N 2.740°W	2013	Returned to landowner	518 Roman radiates, originally contained within leather bags.
Lightwood Hoard		278	Lightwood Road, Longton, Stoke-on-Trent; Staffordshire; 52.988°N 2.133°W	1960	Potteries Museum & Art Gallery, Stoke-on-Trent	2,461 coins and two silver bracelets in an earthenware pot
Little Brickhill hoards (1962–1964)		4th century	Little Brickhill, Milton Keynes (borough); Buckinghamshire; 51.996°N 0.710°W	1962–1964	Bletchley Archaeological Society, Bletchley	1962; 251 loose coins About 400 corroded mass of coins 1964; 4th-century pottery and sherds 13th-century jug (part); 11th to 12th-century sherds 2nd-century Samian ware fragments glass and jet beads 43 coins
Little Brickhill hoards (1967 & 1987)		late 2nd century	Little Brickhill, Milton Keynes (borough); Buckinghamshire; 51.992°N 0.700°W	1967; 1987	British Museum, London; Buckinghamshire County Museum, Aylesbury	1967; 296 silver denarii hearth tools pottery bronze brooch and terret ring 3rd- to 4th-century sherds 1987; 627 silver denarii
Little Orme Hoard (1981)		late 3rd or early 4th century	Little Orme, near Llandudno; Conwy; 53.324°N 3.778°W	1981	National Museum Cardiff	5 ox-head bucket-mounts 1 razor handle 1 knife or chisel handle 2 brooches 1 harness ring 68 coins
Llanvaches Hoard	Coins from the Llanvaches Hoard	mid-2nd century	Llanvaches; Monmouthshire; 51.617°N 2.817°W	2006	National Roman Legion Museum, Caerleon	599 silver denarii
Londonthorpe I Hoard		late 2nd century	Londonthorpe; Lincolnshire; 52.922°N 0.603°W	1976	British Museum (part); Lincoln Museum (part); Belton House (part); rest returned to finder	420 silver denarii (Mark Antony – Antoninus Pius) together with fragments of the base of a small grey flagon which judging from its size and the marks of corrosion on the inside had originally contained the whole hoard.
Londonthorpe II Hoard (also known as the Ropsley Hoard)		late 2nd century	Londonthorpe; Lincolnshire; 52.922°N 0.603°W	2018	Returned to landowner	522 silver denarii (Mark Antony – Antoninus Pius) reportedly found in a possible crude cist inside a Roman greyware vessel (complete but broken, with interior staining from coins).
M1 Motorway Hoard		late 3rd century	M1 motorway Leicestershire (see note)	1980 (see note)		207 silver denarii 228 base-silver radiates 2 grey ware pottery fragments (Note: The hoard was reported by a widow whose husband had been a digger driver working on the motorway. The exact location and date of the find was not known.)
Malmesbury Hoard		late 3rd century	Malmesbury; Wiltshire	2012	Athelstan Museum, Malmesbury	1266 coins (3 radiates, 1263 nummi) dating to the late 3rd-early 4th century AD within a ceramic vessel.
Malpas Hoard		50 AD	Malpas, Cheshire	2014	Liverpool Museum, Congleton Museum	7 Iron Age British coins made between AD20 and AD50. The 28 Roman coins are early examples, before the conquest of Britain, of the type that would have been in circulation when Roman soldiers arrived in Britain in AD43
Maundown Hoard		late 3rd century	Maundown, near Wiveliscombe; Somerset; 51.054°N 3.336°W	2006	Museum of Somerset, Taunton	2,118 bronze coins
Mildenhall Treasure	The great dish from the Mildenhall Treasure	mid-4th century	Mildenhall; Suffolk; 52.367°N 0.434°E	1942	British Museum, London	34 items of silver tableware
Monknash Hoard		mid-2nd century	Monknash; South Glamorgan; 51.425°N 3.552°W	2000	National Museum Wales, Cardiff	103 silver denarii grey ware pot
Nether Compton Hoard		mid-4th century	Nether Compton; Dorset; 50.954°N 2.574°W	1989		22,670 coins
Newport Pagnell Hoard		mid-4th century	near Newport Pagnell; Buckinghamshire; 52.087°N 0.722°W	2006		More than 1,400 bronze coins pottery
Osgodby Hoard		2nd century	Osgodby; Lincolnshire; 53.417°N 0.383°W	1999	British Museum, London	44 silver denarii finger ring bronze brooch coarseware pottery vessel
Otterbourne Hoard I	Coins and pot of the Otterbourne Hoard I	early 5th century	Otterbourne; Hampshire; 51.007°N 1.342°W	1978	Winchester City Museum	Nearly 550 silver siliquae and other coins dated 364–423 in a pot
Otterbourne Hoard II	Coins from the Otterbourne Hoard II	early 5th century	Otterbourne; Hampshire; 51.007°N 1.342°W	1978	Winchester City Museum	Silver siliquae
Overton Hoard	Coins from the Overton Hoard	205 AD	Overton; North Yorkshire; 53.994°N 1.156°W	2016	Yorkshire Museum, York	37 silver coins and pottery fragments.
Patching Hoard		mid-5th century	Patching; West Sussex; 50.847°N 0.457°W	1997	Worthing Museum and Art Gallery	13 Roman and 10 Visigothic gold solidi 21 Roman, 3 Visigothic, and 3 unidentified silver coins 2 gold rings 54 pieces of scrap silver, including a scabbard fitting
Piddletrenthide Hoard	Piddletrenthide hoard in situ	late 3rd century	Piddletrenthide, Dorset; 50.800°N 2.425°W	2016		2,114 Roman radiate coins in an incomplete pottery vessel.
Pot Shaft Hoard		4th century	Alderley Edge Mines; Cheshire; 53.296°N 2.212°W	1995	Manchester Museum	564 Roman coins dating from AD 317–336, mainly Constantine and house of Constantine pieces
Preshaw Park Hoard	Coins from the Preshaw Park Hoard	early 4th century	Preshaw Park, Exton; Hampshire; 51.016°N 1.188°W	1855	Winchester City Museum	280 uncirculated bronze coins dated 280–309 in a narrow-necked pot
Prestwood hoards		early 3rd to early 4th century	Prestwood; Buckinghamshire; 51.693°N 0.732°W	1999 and 2005	Buckinghamshire County Museum, Aylesbury	Hoard A: 112 silver denarii and 1 radiate Hoard B: 735 base silver nummi and pot fragment
Reading Hoard		Unknown	The Ridgeway School, Reading; Berkshire; 51.428°N 0.952°W	2015	Reading Museum, Reading	About 300 coins in a pottery vessel
Rhayader Treasure		2nd to 3rd century	Rhayader; Powys; 52.29°N 3.50°W	1899	British Museum, London	1 gold ring with onyx stone; 11 pieces of gold necklet with 8 stones, 1 piece of scroll and a small embossed section; 4 pieces of gold armlet
Ribchester Hoard	The Ribchester Helmet	late 1st to early 2nd century	Ribchester; Lancashire; 53.81°N 2.53°W	1796	British Museum, London	A bronze cavalry helmet, a number of patera, pieces of a vase, a bust of Minerva, fragments of two basins, and several plates.
Rogiet Hoard		late 3rd century	Rogiet; Monmouthshire; 51.58°N 2.79°W	1998	National Museum of Wales, Cardiff	3,778 silver coins
Ryedale Hoard		late 2nd century	Ryedale; North Yorkshire	2020	Yorkshire Museum, York	Four copper alloy objects: A bust of Marcus Aurelius (probably from a sceptre), a horse-and-rider figurine, a zoomorphic key handle, and a plumb bob.
Seaton Down Hoard	Coins from the Sarum Road Hoard	early 4th century	Seaton Down; Devon	2013	Royal Albert Memorial Museum, Exeter	22,888 copper alloy coins
Sarum Road Hoard	Coins from the Sarum Road Hoard	early 1st century	Sarum Road, Winchester; Hampshire; 51.060°N 1.365°W	1996	Winchester City Museum	8 silver denarii dated 78BC – AD37
Shapwick hoards (1936–1938)		early 4th to mid-5th century	Shapwick; Somerset; 51.14°N 2.83°W	1936–1938	Museum of Somerset, Taunton; British Museum, London	Pewter cup, saucer, platter, jug, canister, bowl with pedestal pottery beaker 245 silver siliquae 1,170 bronze coins bronze cased wooden stave tankard bronze bowl
Shapwick Hoard (1978)		4th century	Shapwick; Somerset; 51.14°N 2.83°W	1978	Glastonbury Museum	More than 1,000 copper coins pewter vessel
Shapwick Hoard (1998)		mid-3rd century	Shapwick; Somerset; 51.14°N 2.83°W	1998	Somerset County Museum, Taunton	9,262 coins
Shillington Hoard		late 1st century	Shillington; Bedfordshire; 51.970°N 0.363°W	1998–1999	Wardown Park Museum, Luton	Hoard A: 127 gold aurei Hoard B: 18 silver denarii
Shiptonthorpe Hoard		early 4th century	Shiptonthorpe; East Yorkshire; 53.879°N 0.705°W	2000	Hull and East Riding Museum, Kingston upon Hull	503 base silver coins pot fragments
Shoreham Hoard		late 3rd century	Shoreham-by-Sea; West Sussex; 50.833°N 0.268°W	1999		4,105 base silver denarii and radiates pottery vessel
Shrewsbury Hoard	The Shrewsbury Hoard	mid-4th century	near Shrewsbury; Shropshire; 52.71°N 2.75°W	2009	Shrewsbury Museum and Art Gallery	9,315 bronze coins
Silchester Hoard (1894)	Part of the Silchester Hoard (1894) on display at Reading Museum	late 2nd century	Silchester; Hampshire; 51.35°N 1.09°W	1894	Reading Museum; British Museum, London	258 silver denarii
Silchester Hoard (1985–1987)		early 5th century	Silchester; Hampshire; 51.35°N 1.09°W	1985–1987	Reading Museum	About 39 silver and bronze coins 3 gold rings
Snettisham Jeweller's Hoard	Selection of items from the Snettisham Jeweller's Hoard	mid-2nd century	Snettisham; Norfolk; 52.876°N 0.497°E	1985	British Museum, London	83 silver coins, 27 bronze coins, and quantities of gems, jewellery and scrap metal
Snodland Hoard	The Snodland Hoard in situ during excavation	mid-4th century	Snodland; Kent; 51.328°N 0.447°E	2006		More than 3,600 bronze coins
South Petherton Hoard		274 AD	South Petherton	2013	Sestertius of Marcus Aurelius in Museum of Somerset, majority returned to the finder	7,563 coins dating from 161 to 274 AD mainly debased Antoninianii of the Gallic Empire
St Albans Hoard		late 4th century	St Albans; Hertfordshire	2012	Verulamium Museum, St Albans	159 gold solidi
Stanchester Hoard		early 5th century	Wilcot; Wiltshire; 51.35°N 1.79°W	2000	Wiltshire Museum, Devizes	1,166 coins (3 gold, 1,162 silver, 1 bronze)
Stogursey Hoard (1999)		late 3rd century	Stogursey; Somerset; 51.18°N 3.14°W	1999 and 2002	3 coins at British Museum some others at Somerset	1,097 base silver radiates pottery vessel remains (Note: There was also a Bronze Age gold ornament found at the same time, but it is not considered to be part of this hoard.); 50 copper alloy coins
Stoke-on-Trent Hoard A		late 2nd century	Stoke-on-Trent; Staffordshire; 53.0°N 2.2°W	2012	Potteries Museum & Art Gallery, Hanley	258 silver denarii dating between 31 BC and AD 176
Stony Stratford Hoard	Stony Stratford Hoard on display in the British Museum	3rd century	Old Stratford; Northamptonshire; 52.056°N 0.865°W	1789	British Museum, London	2 chain headresses, 3 fibulae, various fragments of silver plaques with figures of, or inscriptions to, Roman gods, in an urn
Sully Hoard (1899)		late 3rd century	Sully, Vale of Glamorgan; South Glamorgan; 51.41°N 3.21°W	1899	British Museum, London	322 coins (7 gold, some silver, and rest bronze); 4 gold rings
Sully Hoard (2008)	Coins in the Sully Hoard	mid-4th century	Sully, Vale of Glamorgan; South Glamorgan; 51.41°N 3.21°W	2008	National Museum Wales	2,366 bronze coins in one pot 3,547 bronze coins in another pot
Thetford Hoard	22 finger rings from the Thetford Hoard	mid-4th century	near Thetford; Norfolk; 52.41°N 0.74°E	1979	British Museum, London	33 silver spoons 22 gold finger rings 4 pendants several necklaces a gold buckle
Thornbury Hoard	Coins from the Thornbury Hoard	mid-4th century	Thornbury; Gloucestershire; 51.609°N 2.520°W	2004	Bristol City Museum and Art Gallery	11,460 coins
Tinwell Hoard		late 3rd century	Tinwell; Rutland; 52.662°N 0.533°W	1999	Rutland County Museum, Oakham	2,831 base-silver coins
Traprain Treasure	Silver fragments from the hoard	early 5th century	Traprain Law, near Haddington; East Lothian; 55.960°N 2.674°W	1919	Museum of Scotland, Edinburgh	53 pounds of sliced up silver tableware some Christian items a Roman officer's uniform 4 coins
Upchurch Hoard	Pot and selection of coins from the Upchurch Hoard	early 4th century	Upchurch; Kent; 51.385°N 0.663°E	1950	Private collection	37 bronze coins
Vale of Pewsey hoard (2020)		340 – 402	Vale of Pewsey; Wiltshire	2020		160 silver coins and 1 copper coin
Walton (Milton Keynes) Hoard		early 4th century	Walton, Milton Keynes; Buckinghamshire; 52.020°N 0.712°W	1987		97 bronze coins
Water Newton Treasure	Gold plaque from the Water Newton Treasure	4th century	Water Newton; Cambridgeshire; 52.55°N 0.34°W	1975	British Museum, London	27 silver items, including jugs, hanging-bowls, bowls and votive plaques 1 gold votive plaque
Welbourn Hoard		mid-4th century	Welbourn; Lincolnshire; 53.06°N 0.55°W	1998	8 coins at British Museum, London	436 base silver nummi Shelly Ware container
Wem Hoard		late 5th century	Wem; Shropshire; 52.85°N 2.750°W	2018		336 items of Roman hacksilver, including 37 Roman coins
West Bagborough Hoard		mid-4th century	West Bagborough; Somerset; 51.09°N 3.18°W	2001	Somerset County Museum, Taunton	669 Roman coins and 64 pieces of hacksilver
Westhall Hoard		mid-2nd century (Note: The Roman coins in the Westhall Hoard indicate a burial later than 138 AD, but the terrets date to the Iron Age, circa 1–70 AD, probably before the Roman Conquest.)	Westhall; Suffolk; 52.410°N 1.546°E	1855	British Museum, London; Norwich Castle Museum	9 bronze terrets and some Roman coins in a bronze bowl
Weston Underwood Hoard		1st and 2nd century	Weston Underwood, Milton Keynes (borough); Buckinghamshire; 52.160°N 0.755°W	1858	Buckinghamshire County Museum	166 silver denarii 10 other coins earthenware vessel Samian bowl various sherds and other pottery
Whorlton Hoard		late 4th century	Whorlton; North Yorkshire; 54.417°N 1.238°E	1810		Leather bag containing mixed coinage and metalwork hoard. Up to 7000 objects.
Wickham Market Hoard		late 3rd century	Wickham Market; Suffolk; 52.158°N 1.363°E	1984		Pot containing 1,587 coins
Wold Newton Hoard	Wold Newton Hoard as it was found	307 AD	Wold Newton; East Yorkshire; 54.140°N 0.400°W	2014	Yorkshire Museum, York	1,857 copper coins in ceramic pot
Worcestershire Conquest Hoard		55 AD	Leigh, Worcestershire or Bransford, Worcestershire	2023	Worcester Art Museum	1,367 Roman coins, 1 Celtic Stater in shattered ceramic pot
Womersley II		354 AD	Wold Newton; East Yorkshire; 53.6906°N 1.22106°W	2011	Wakefield Museum	445 nummi in and associated metalwork. Note that the Cridling Stubbs Hoard is also known as Womersley I
Yeovil Hoard		270 AD	Yeovil; Somerset	2013	Museum of Somerset	3335 coins, including 165 denarii, originally contained in a cloth bags
York Hoard (1840)		3rd century AD	York; North Yorkshire	1840	Yorkshire Museum	Approximately 200 denarii.
Yorkley Hoard		mid-4th century	Yorkley; Gloucestershire; 51.760°N 2.530°W	2012	Dean Heritage Centre, Gloucestershire	500 bronze coins, probably originally contained in a cloth bag

== See also ==
- List of hoards in Britain
- List of Bronze Age hoards in Britain
- List of Iron Age hoards in Britain
