= Bennington (disambiguation) =

Bennington, Vermont is a town in the United States.

Bennington may also refer to:

== Places ==
=== Canada ===
- Bennington, Ontario, a community in the township of Zorra

=== United States ===
- Bennington, Idaho
- Bennington, Illinois
- Bennington, Indiana
- Bennington, Kansas
- Bennington, Nebraska
- Bennington, New Hampshire, a New England town
  - Bennington (CDP), New Hampshire, the main village in the town
- Bennington, New York
- Bennington, Oklahoma
- Bennington (CDP), Vermont, an urbanized area within the town of Bennington
- Bennington County, Vermont

== Other uses ==
- Bennington (surname)
- Battle of Bennington, near Bennington, Vermont
- Bennington College, located in the town of Bennington, Vermont
- Bennington Triangle, an alleged paranormal zone in Vermont
- USS Bennington, two ships
- Bennington, a type of salt-glazed fired clay toy marble
- Bennington (radio show), a radio show on SiriusXM
- The Bennington flag, a version of the American flag associated with the American Revolution Battle of Bennington

== See also ==
- Bennington Township (disambiguation)
- Benington (disambiguation)
- Binnington (disambiguation)
- North Bennington, Vermont
- Old Bennington, Vermont
- Long Bennington, Lincolnshire, England
- Pennington (disambiguation)
