= Binnington =

Binnington may refer to:

== People ==
- Jordan Binnington (born 1993), Canadian professional ice hockey goaltender
- Max Binnington (born 1949), Australian sprinter
- William Binnington Boyce (1804–1889), English philologist

== Places ==
- Binnington, North Yorkshire, a village in England
  - Binnington Carr Hoard

== See also ==
- Benington (disambiguation)
- Bennington (disambiguation)
- Pinnington, a surname
