= Shapwick =

Shapwick may refer to:

- Shapwick, Dorset, England
- Shapwick, Somerset, England
- The Shapwick Hoard, a Roman coin discovery in Shapwick, Somerset
