= Vale of Pewsey hoards =

Roman hoards found in Wiltshire, England

A number of Roman hoards have been discovered near Pewsey and Wilcot in the Vale of Pewsey, Wiltshire, England.

== 2000 ==
On 25 July 2000, John and David Philpott discovered a hoard of 1,166 coins (mostly silver siliquae) near Wilcot. The Stanchester Hoard, as it is now known, is in the Wiltshire Museum.

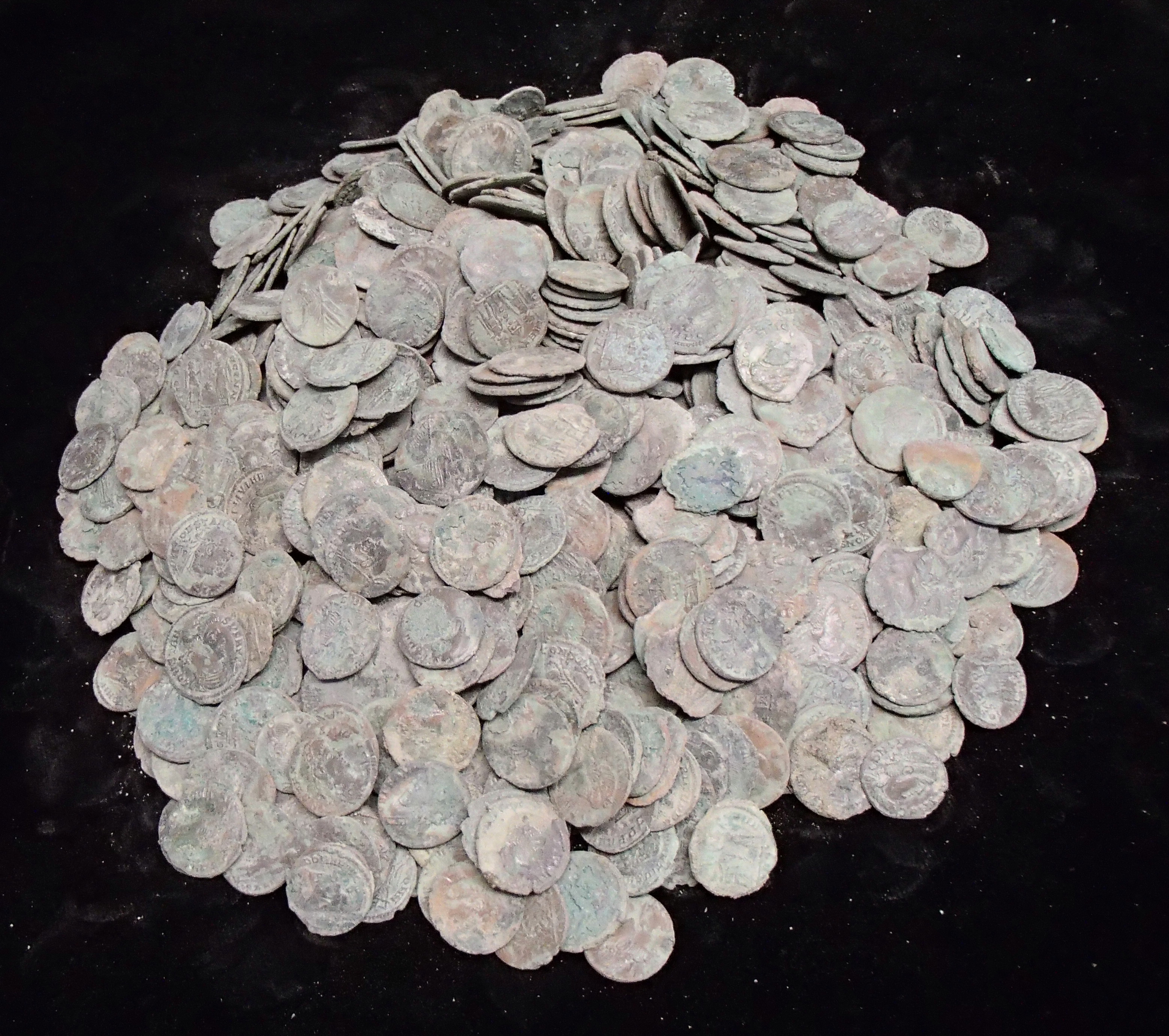
The coin hoard discovered in May 2014

== April 2014 ==
From January to April 2014, Nick Barrett discovered 42 clipped silver siliquae. The find has been designated by the Portable Antiquities Scheme as WILT-B53A45.

== May 2014 ==
In May 2014, Russell Garman discovered a coin hoard of 2,384 coins, mostly nummi. It has been designated by the Portable Antiquities Scheme as BERK-637CB6.

== October 2014 ==
On 26 October 2014, Rob Abbot, Dave Allen, and Mick Rae discovered a hoard of eight Roman copper-alloy vessels packed inside an iron-rimmed cauldron. This has been designated by the Portable Antiquities Scheme as WILT-0F898C. The vessels are now in the Salisbury Museum.

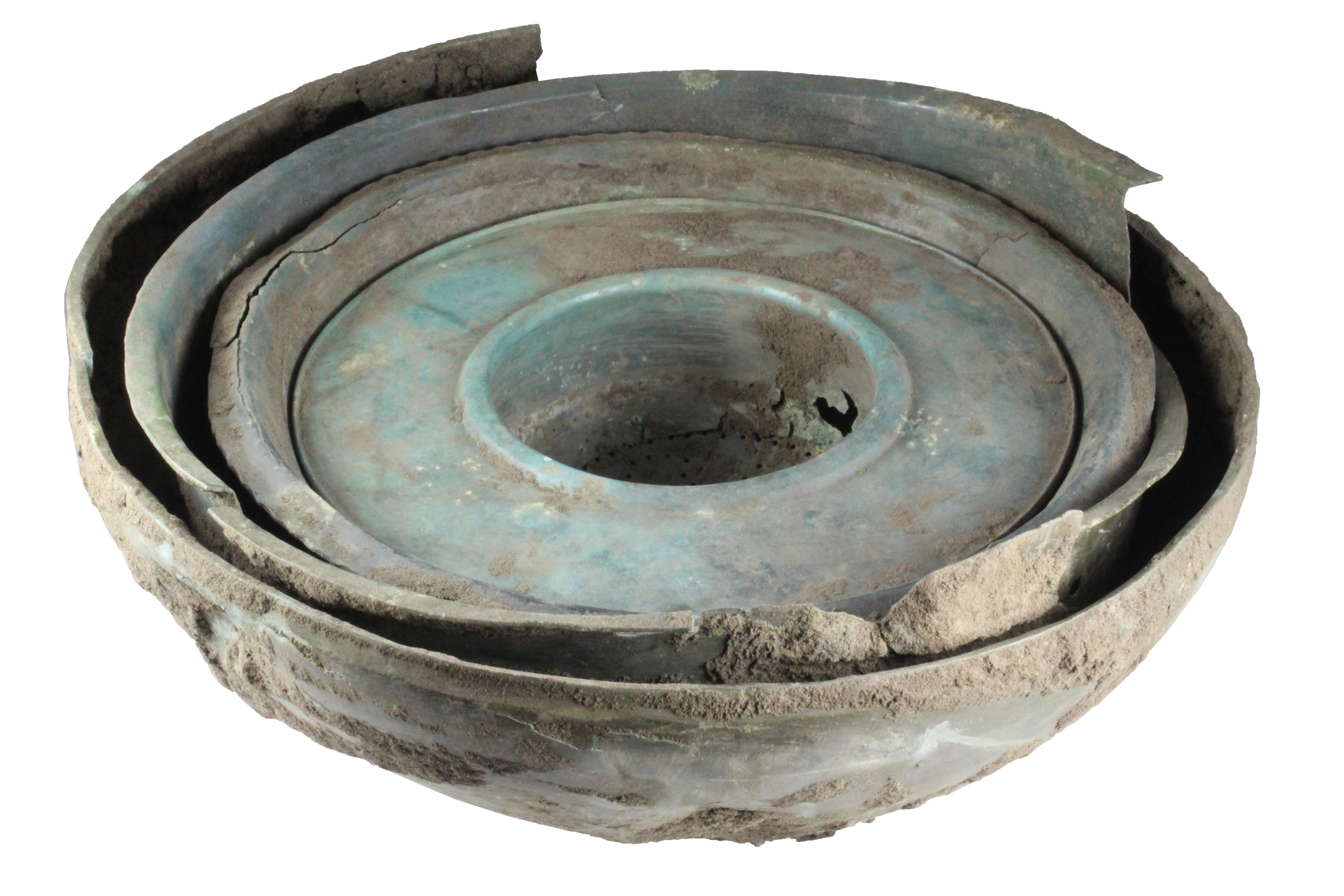
The hoard of vessels discovered in 2017

== 2017 ==
A hoard consisting of a bowl strainer, two basins and a bowl was found at Wilcot in 2017. It has been designated by the Portable Antiquities Scheme as WILT-047110.

== 2020 ==
On 12 and 13 September 2020, Rob Abbot, Dave Allen and Mick Rae (who had made a discovery in 2014) found a total of 160 silver (and one copper) coins: 23 miliarenses and 137 siliquae, from Constans to Honorius. It was designated by the Portable Antiquities Scheme as BM-7D34D9. Two of the coins went to the British Museum, and most of the rest were auctioned by Noonans Mayfair: they were expected to fetch £40,000 but ended up making £81,160.

== See also ==
- List of Roman hoards in Great Britain
