= Follis =

Roman and Byzantine bronze coins

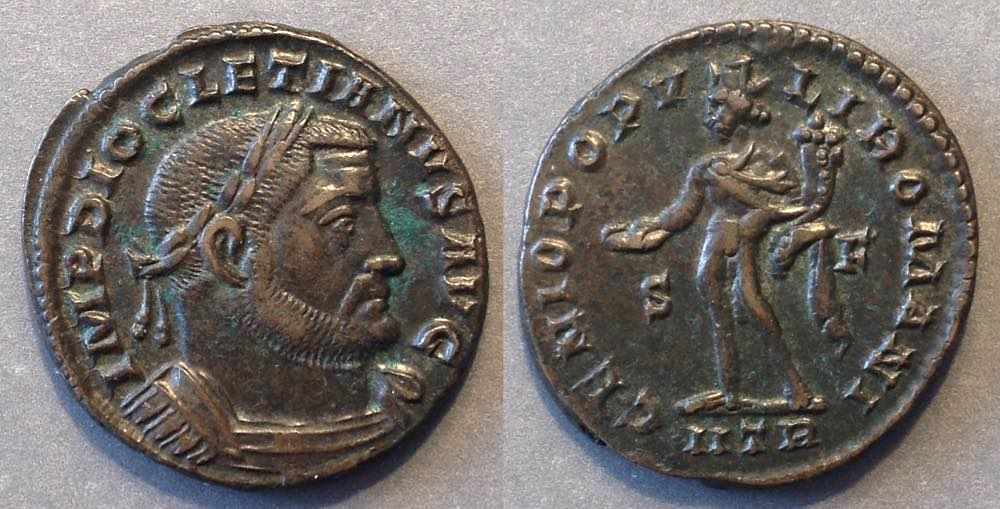
An AE1 follis of Diocletian, 27 mm

The follis (plural folles; Italian: follaro, Arabic: فلس, romanized: fals) is both a general term for specific types of bronze coinage that circulated during the Late Roman Empire and for bronze coinage of the Byzantine Empire worth 40 nummi.

== Roman coin ==
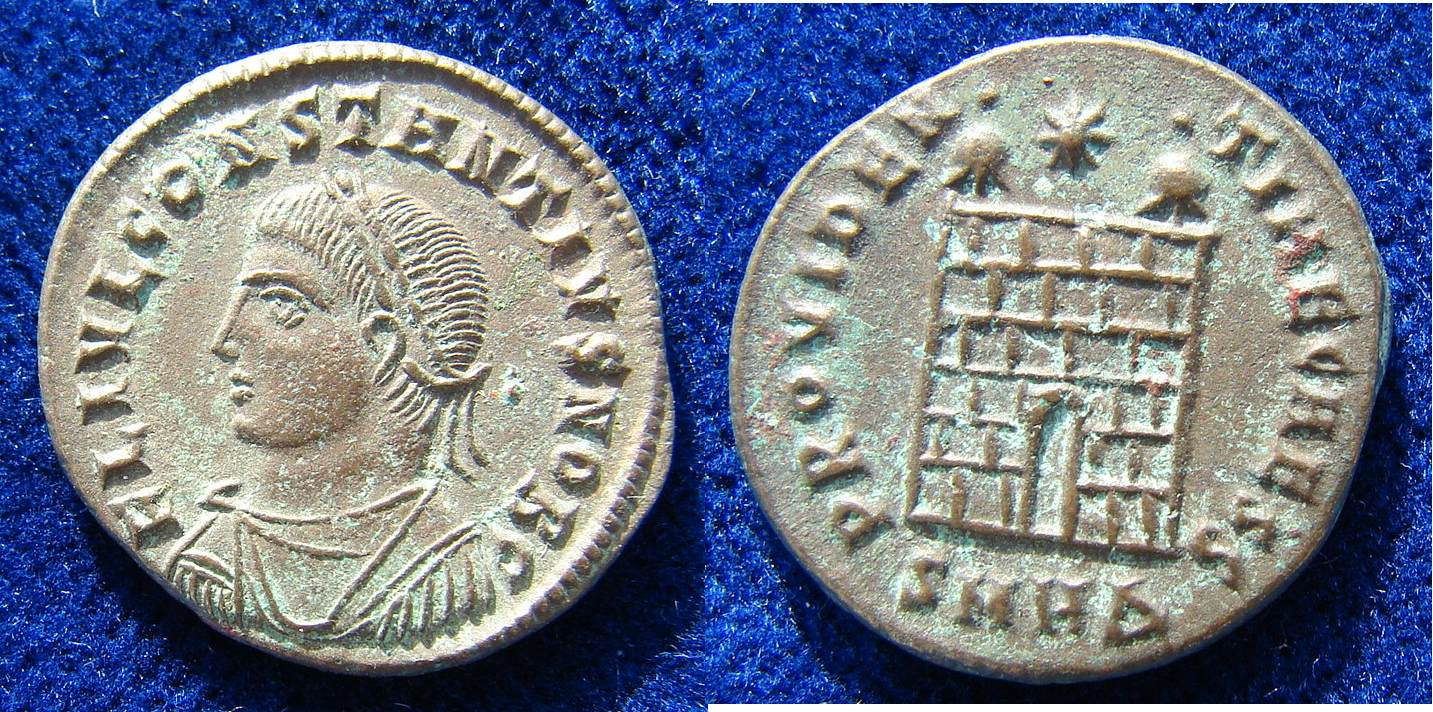
Constantius II as Caesar on an AE3 follis, 18 mm, minted in Heraclea in 325 AD.

The term follis is used for a large bronze Roman coin denomination introduced by Diocletian in about 294 AD. The term nummus is now thought to be the actual ancient term, but usage of the word nummus has not caught on. At first the follis weighed about 10 grams and had a silver content of about 4%, with a thin layer of silver on the surface. Over the next decades it declined both in size and in silver content.

The word follis means "bag" (which is usually made of leather) in Latin, and there is evidence that this term was used in antiquity for a sealed bag containing a specific amount of coins. It has also been suggested that the coin was named follis because of the ancient Greek word "φολίς," meaning "a thin layer of metal" (cf. Latin folium, "leaf") which covers the surface of various objects, since the coin originally had a thin layer of silver. The follis of Diocletian, despite efforts to enforce prices with the Edict on Maximum Prices in 301 AD, was revalued and reduced as time passed. By the time of Constantine the Great, it was smaller and barely contained any silver. A series of Constantinian bronzes was introduced in the mid-4th century, although the specific denominations are unclear and debated by historians and numismatists. They are referred to as AE1, AE2, AE3 and AE4, with the first being the largest (near 27 mm) and the last the smallest (averaging 15 mm) in diameter. Namely:

| AE1 | AE2 | AE3 | AE4 |
|---|---|---|---|
| over 25 mm | 21 – 25 mm | 17 – 21 mm | under 17 mm |

=== Discoveries ===
Large hoards of folles have been discovered all across the Roman empire. For example, in Seaton Down, Devon, England, near the site of a second- to third-century Roman villa and fortifications, 22,888 folles were found in 2013. Fourth century folles represent the largest category of coin finds in the United Kingdom. Between 30,000 and 50,000 exceptionally well-preserved folles from the first half of the fourth century were discovered in the sea near the north-east shore of Sardinia in 2023.

== Byzantine coin ==
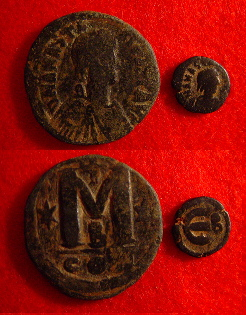
Reverses of a follis (or 40 nummi, marked by "M" for "40" in Greek numerals) next to a pentanummium (or 5 nummi, marked by "Є" for "5" in Greek numerals), both of Anastasius.

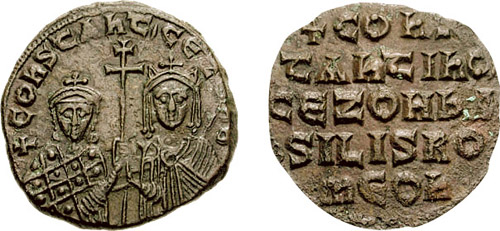
A Byzantine follis of Constantine VII and Zoe, minted in 914-919 AD. 26 mm.

The term is also used for the large bronze coin denomination of 40 nummi introduced in 498 AD with the coinage reform of Anastasius, which included a series of bronze denominations with their values marked in Greek numerals.

The fals (the name derived from follis) was a bronze coin issued by the Umayyad and Abbasid caliphates beginning in the late 8th century, initially as imitations of the Byzantine follis.

== See also ==
- Trifollaro, a medieval coin worth 3 folles
- Falus, former Moroccan coin
- Fils, modern subdivision of certain Arab currencies

== Sources ==
- Grierson, Philip (1999), Byzantine coinage (PDF), Dumbarton Oaks, ISBN 978-0-88402-274-9, archived from the original (PDF) on 13 June 2010
- Hendy, Michael F. (1985), Studies in the Byzantine Monetary Economy c.300–1450, Cambridge University Press, ISBN 0-521-24715-2
- Kazhdan, Alexander, ed. (1991). The Oxford Dictionary of Byzantium. Oxford and New York: Oxford University Press. ISBN 0-19-504652-8.
