= Deepdale Hoard =

Coordinates: 53.65696°N 0.41265°W

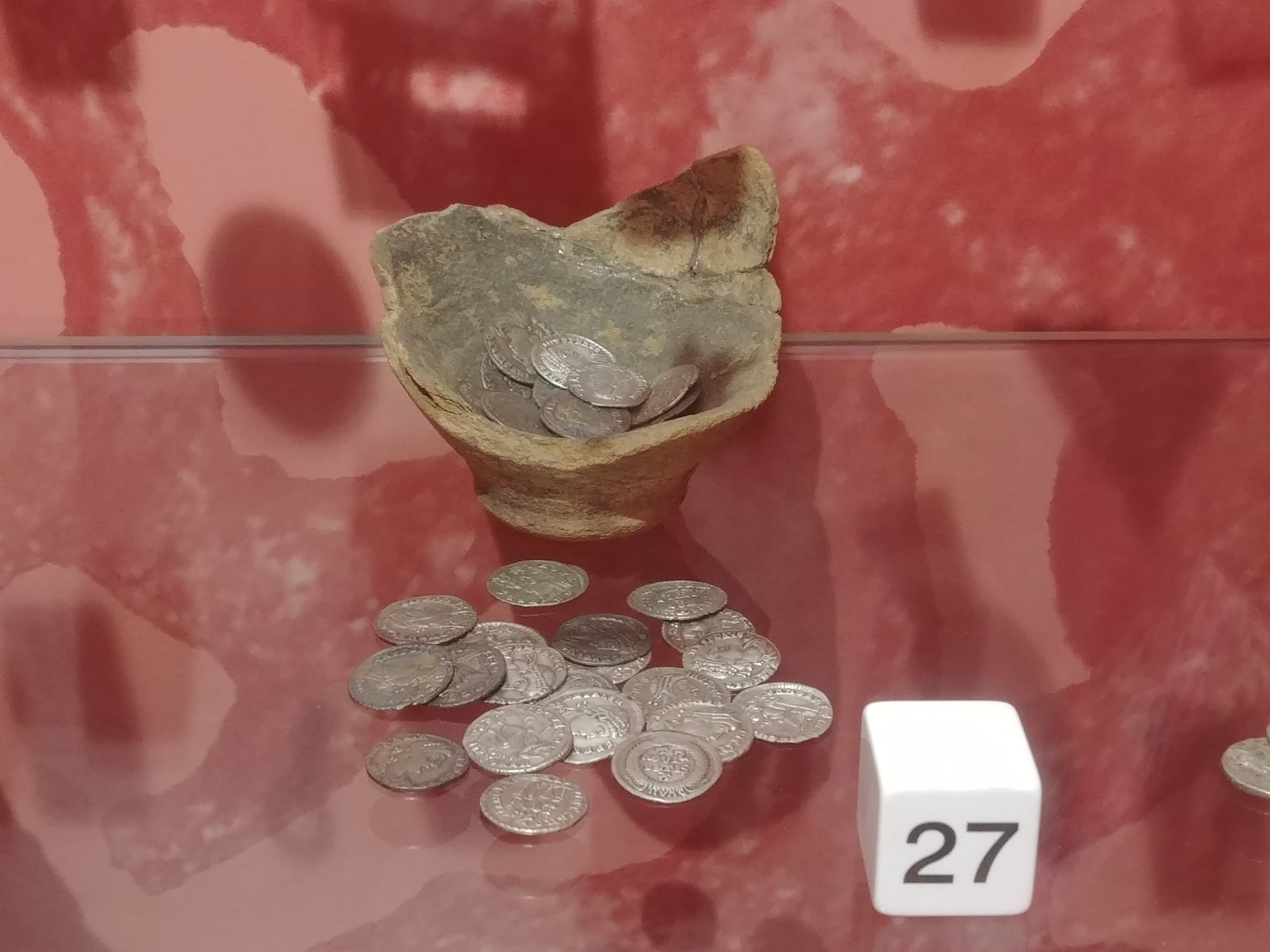
A portion of the Deepdale Hoard on display in the North Lincolnshire Museum.

The Deepdale Hoard is a Roman coin hoard found in Deepdale (near Barton-upon-Humber) in North Lincolnshire in 1979. It consisted of 260 silver siliquae and one gold solidus.

The initial discovery of the hoard was on 11 May 1979, with further coins found over the next two years. The majority of the coins were found in a pot (2/3 of which survived) while others were found scattered nearby. The coins were from the reigns of Constantius II to Honorius.

The hoard has been split between a number of museums, including the British Museum, the North Lincolnshire Museum, and the East Riding of Yorkshire Council Museum Service.

== See also ==
- List of Roman hoards in Great Britain
