= Stanchester Hoard =

Coordinates: 51.35°N 1.79°W

- Material: Coins
- Size: 1,166 coins
- Period/culture: Romano-British
- Discovered: Wilcot, Vale of Pewsey, Wiltshire, by John and David Philpott on 25 July 2000
- Present location: Wiltshire Museum, Devizes
- Identification: 2000 Fig 268

The Stanchester Hoard is a hoard of 1,166 Roman coins dating from the fourth to early fifth century found in 2000 at Wilcot, in the Vale of Pewsey, Wiltshire, England. The find was considered important because of the large quantity of unclipped silver coins contained within. It was also the latest dated example of Roman coins found in Wiltshire.

== Discovery ==
The hoard was discovered in a field on 25 July 2000 by John and David Philpotts, using metal detectors. It had been buried in a flagon made from pottery of the Alice Holt type. The hoard was named after the former Stanchester villa, a nearby Roman villa with which the hoard was likely to have been associated, along with the Wansdyke earthwork. Excavations of the villa in 1931 and 1969 revealed a wall and evidence for a Roman central heating system. Roof and flue tiles and pottery shards were dated by associated coins, which were from the 2nd to the 4th centuries.

The Wiltshire Museum in Devizes acquired the hoard for £50,000 following a coroner's inquest which declared it treasure trove.

== Items discovered ==
Coins from the hoard came from a number of locations across Europe.

The Stanchester Hoard contains three gold solidi, 33 silver miliarenses—many described as in "mint condition", 1129 silver siliquae and one copper-alloy nummus, as well as a fragment of a bronze ring. The earliest coin was struck in the reign of Constantine I starting in 307; the latest coin was struck in 406 during the joint reign of Arcadius and Honorius. The silver coins were not clipped, suggesting that they had never been circulated. Within a year of the latest minting, Constantine III, declared emperor by his troops, crossed to Gaul with an army and was defeated by Honorius; it is unclear how many Roman troops remained or ever returned, or whether a commander-in-chief in Britain was ever reappointed.

Reign	Date	? of coins	Empire
Constantinian	307–363	99	Western
Valentinian	364–392	863	Western
Magnus Maximus	383–388	197	Western
Arcadius/Honorius	383–423	3	E / W
Uncertain	–	4	–

The coins came from a number of mints across the Roman Empire, at Siscia, Sirmium, Constantinople, Trier, Aquileia, Lyons, Rome, Thessaloniki, Milan and Antioch.

== Other Stanchester finds ==
In 1865, Roman tesserae, coins, pieces of bronze, shale whorls, pottery and a flint knife were found in an area known as Stanchester in Curry Rivel, Somerset.

Other Roman places in England named Stanchester include the site of another villa in Pitchford, Shropshire.

== See also ==
- List of hoards in Britain
- Vale of Pewsey hoards
