= Seaton Down Hoard =

Roman hoard from Devon

Seaton Down hoard
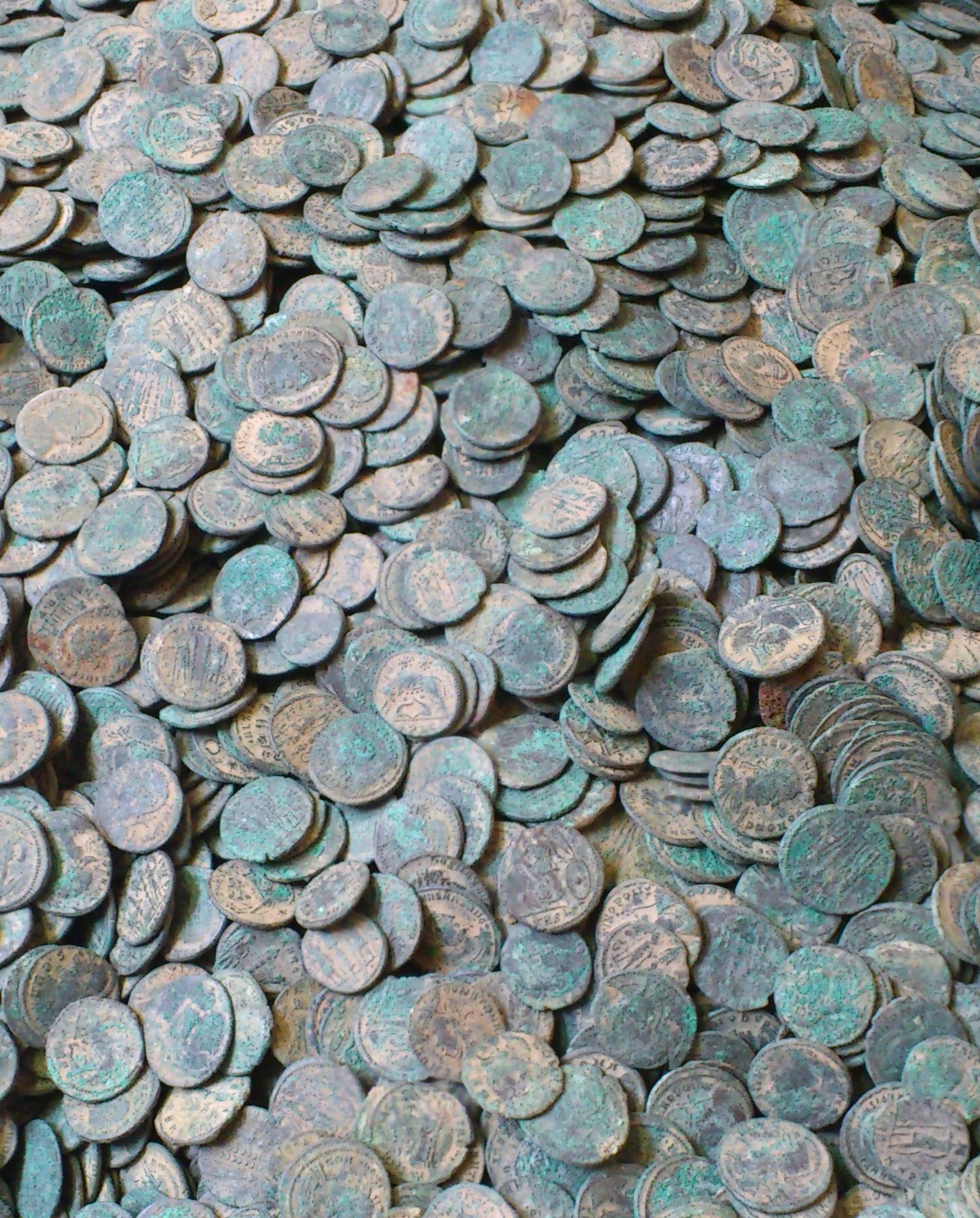
- Material: 22,888 Roman coins
- Discovered: Laurence Egerton
- Present location: near Seaton Down in Devon, England

The Seaton Down Hoard is a hoard of 22,888 Roman coins found in November 2013 by metal detectorist Laurence Egerton near Seaton Down in Devon, England.

== History ==
The coins were found near the site of a Roman fort and possible villa in Honeyditches which was built in the second to third century. The coins date from AD 260 to 348. The coins are made from copper-alloy. The hoard is one of the largest ever found of 4th-century coins in the former Roman empire and consists of coins from the reign of Roman emperor Constantine I and his family in AD 306 and the joint reign of Constantius II and his younger brother Constans, from AD 337 to 340. The Royal Albert Memorial Museum in Exeter acquired the coins in July 2016.

Coins from the hoard were displayed at the British Museum on 25 September 2014. In the Portable Antiquities Scheme Annual Report 2013, the hoard was named as the one millionth find to be recorded by the Portable Antiquities Scheme.

== See also ==
- List of Roman hoards in Great Britain
- Roman currency
