= Noonans Mayfair =

British auction house

Coordinates: 51.5073°N 0.1445°W

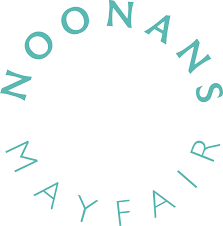
- Formerly: Dix Noonan Webb
- Type: Private company
- Industry: Auctioneering
- Founded: 1990; 36 years ago
- Headquarters: 16 Bolton Street, London, United Kingdom
- Key people: Pierce Noonan (CEO)
- Services: Auctioneer for coins, medals, jewellery and paper money
- Website: www.noonans.co.uk

Noonans Mayfair, formerly Dix Noonan Webb, is an auction house based in London. It specialises in coins, medals, jewellery and paper money. Since being established, the firm has sold over 400,000 lots.

It holds regular traditional auctions throughout the year. As of March 2022, the executives are CEO and chairman Pierce Noonan, deputy chairman and managing director Nimrod Dix, and director of numismatics Christopher Webb. Frances Noble heads the jewellery department.

== History ==
Noonans was established in 1990 as Buckland Dix and Wood. The name was changed to Dix Noonan Webb in 1996 and to its present name in 2022.

Matthew Richardson, curator of social history at Manx National Heritage, suggests that Noonans Mayfair are "Britain's foremost auctioneers of military medals". In 2010, The Independent called the firm "a prominent London auction house, specialising in militaria". Noonans is the largest numismatics auctioneer in London; it had £11.7m of total hammer sales in 2018.

In September 2019, it increased its buyer's premium to 24%, becoming the first UK numismatics auctioneer to go above 20%. During the 2020 COVID-19 lockdown, the company donated 5% of all buyer's premiums to the NHS Charities Together Covid-19 Appeal for a total of £24,879. The firm experienced a record level of website traffic during the COVID lockdown; according to the CEO, "people were stuck at home with little else to spend their money on."

Noonans Mayfair is mentioned in Jeffrey Archer's 2019 novel Nothing Ventured, in which a character is encouraged to visit the firm because they are specialists in Spanish cob coins.

=== SAS medal controversy ===
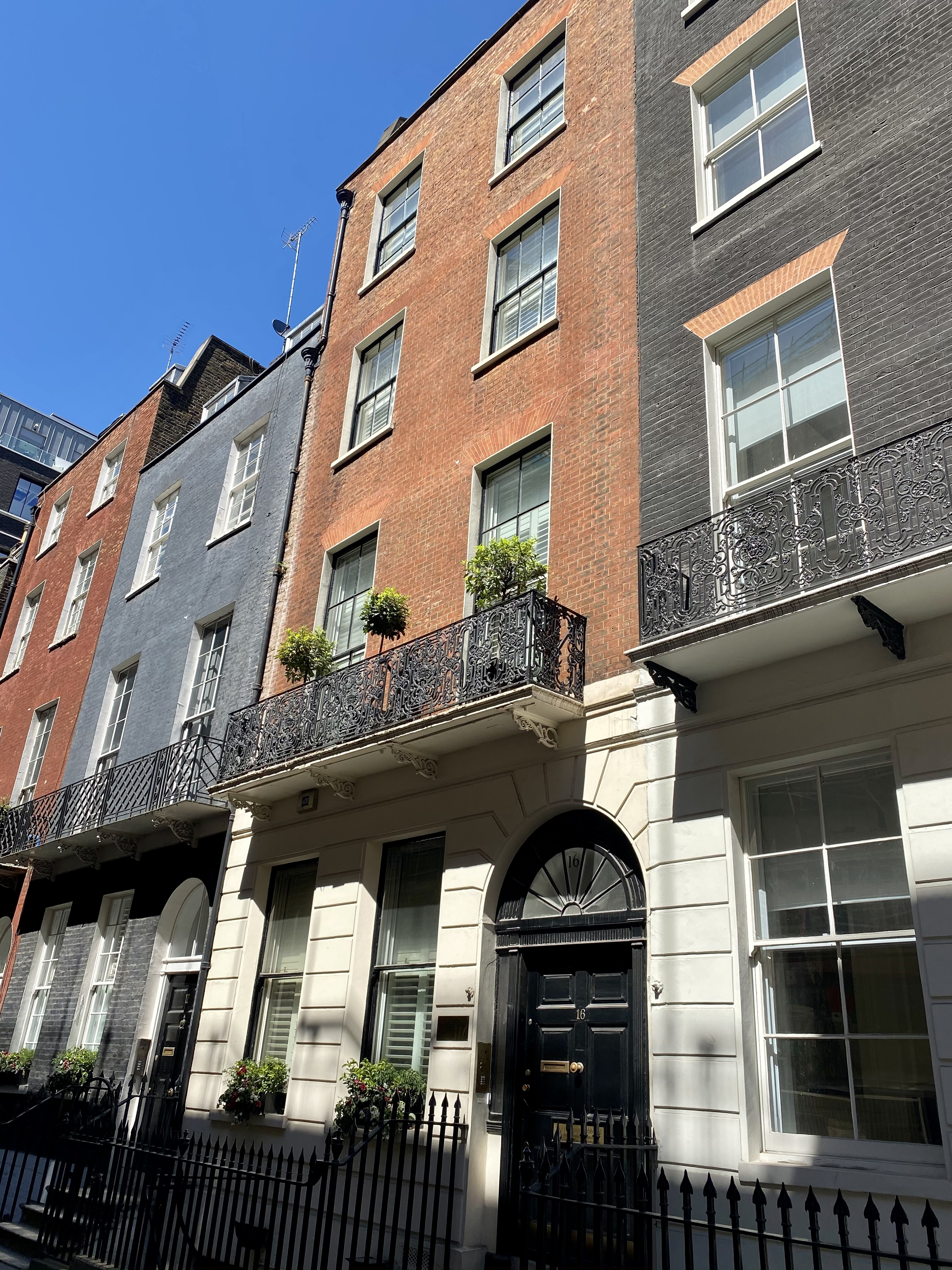
Noonans' office on Bolton Street

In March 1997, the firm auctioned nearly 50 lots of Special Air Service medals and related memorabilia, raising more than £63,000. Pierce Noonan told the Birmingham Post, "Never before have so many awards to members of the SAS been offered to the public at once". But four medals were withdrawn when police said the wife of former sergeant major Mel "Taff" Townsend got a court injunction to halt the auction, identifying the medals as having been stolen in the 1988 burglary of their family home in Kent.

An investigation revealed the medals had been sold multiple times by other reputable dealers before finally coming into the possession of the collector, and were held by the auction house pending the determination of the rightful owner. In June 1998, after a 14-month legal battle, Townsend recovered his medals, which Dix Noonan Webb had estimated would have sold for £20,000 at auction. Townsend later sold his medals in 2009, through Spink & Son.

=== Herefordshire hoard controversy ===
In June 2015, two metal detectorists George Powell and Layton Davies discovered a hoard of 300 Viking era coins and jewellery known as the Herefordshire hoard. Under the stipulations of the Treasure Act 1996, they should have reported the find within 14 days of discovery. They failed to do so, instead electing to sell them illicitly on the black market. One such beneficiary of this practice was Simon Wicks, an antiquities and coin dealer in Sussex. At a hastily arranged meeting at Cobham Services on the M25, Powell met Wicks hoping to sell him a gold ring, an orb and a bracelet now identified as from the trove.

Wicks attests that no coins were produced or bought at this meeting, but one week later he visited Noonans with a parcel of seven coins supposedly acquired by him from a West Country collector in the 1990s, but never photographed or documented. Later, Wicks produced another nine coins at Noonans, supposedly also from his collection with a letter purporting to confirm their ownership by Powell's family before he acquired them. Noonans valued these sixteen coins at £400,000, and arranged for their safe storage. Wicks later told The Sunday Times, "If I knew them coins were stolen, why the hell would I take them to the likes of Noonans...the most reputable coins dealer in the UK?". The coins were confiscated by West Mercia Police, and used in the 2019 trial of the three men. Powell was sentenced to 10 years imprisonment, Davies 8.5 years and Wicks 5 years for assisting in the concealment of the find. The finders were later subject to a further confiscation order of over £600,000 each.

== Recent auction highlights ==
Among the items that Noonans have recently sold at auction are:

- September 2021: A diamond and pearl bracelet once owned by Princess Margaret for £396,800.
- September 2021: A triple unite of Charles I for £54,560.
- December 2021: A set of military decorations, including a Conspicuous Gallantry Cross, for £150,000.
- January 2022: Peter Parrott's decorations, including a Distinguished Flying Cross and an Air Force Cross, for £200,000.
- February 2022: A £100 banknote from the Irish Free State for £39,680.
- March 2022: A 1344 gold half florin for £140,000.
- May 2022: A hoard of 142 Roman silver coins discovered in the Vale of Pewsey for £81,160.
- September 2022: A Victoria Cross belonging to Thomas Henry Kavanagh for £750,000, a new world record for a Victoria Cross at auction.
- October 2022: A Dickin Medal belonging to Rob the Dog for £140,000.
