= Thomas Henry Kavanagh =

Recipient of Victoria Cross (1821–1882)

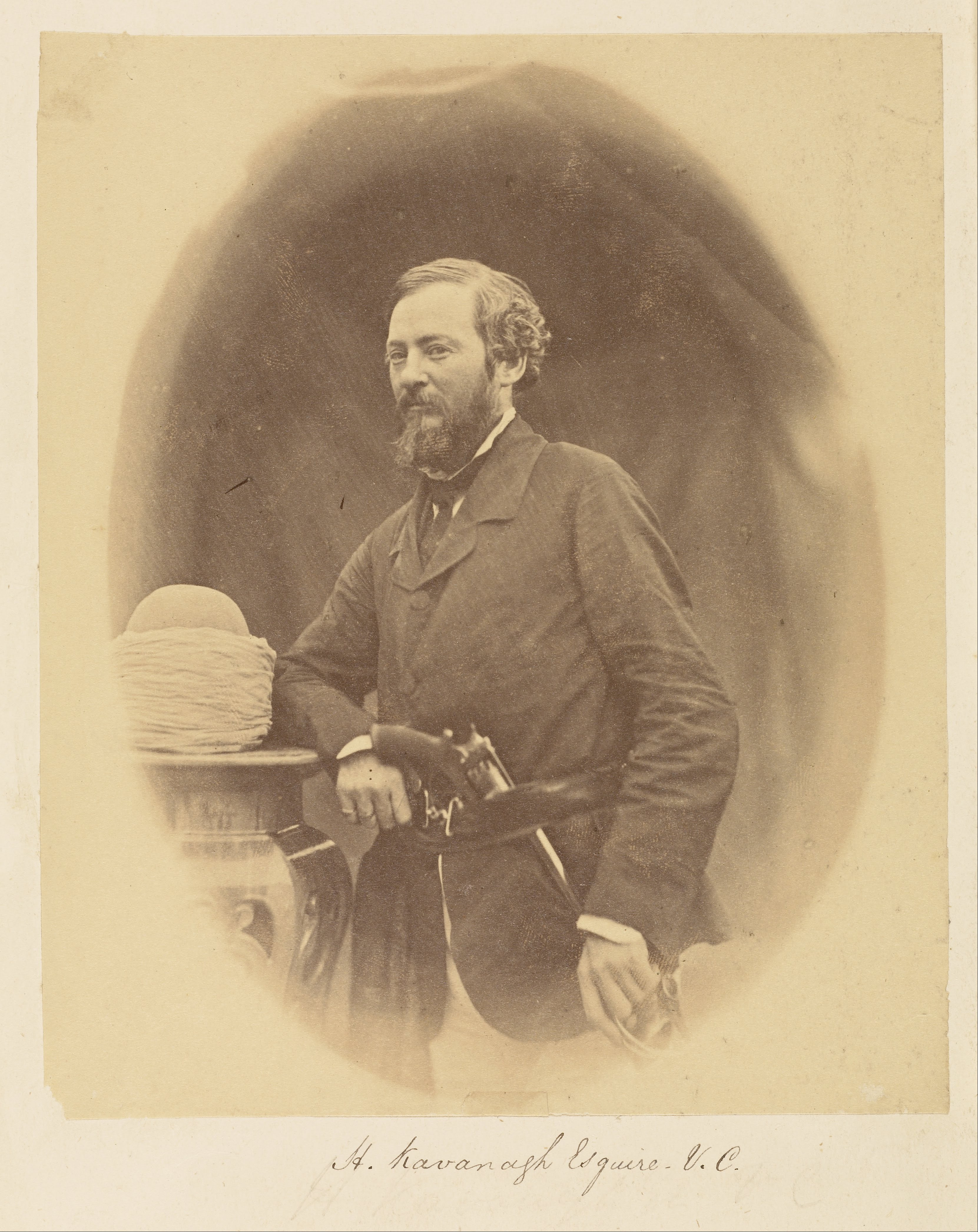
- Born: 15 July 1821; Mullingar, County Westmeath
- Died: 13 November 1882 (aged 61); Gibraltar
- Burial place: North Front Cemetery, Gibraltar
- Military career
- Allegiance: United Kingdom of Great Britain and Ireland
- Conflicts: Indian Mutiny
- Awards: Victoria Cross

Thomas Henry Kavanagh VC (15 July 1821 – 13 November 1882) was a member of the Bengal Civil Service and Irish recipient of the Victoria Cross, the highest and most prestigious award for gallantry which can be awarded to British and Commonwealth forces.

He is one of only five civilians to have ever been awarded the VC.

== Early life ==
Thomas Henry Kavanagh was born in 1821 in Mullingar.

== Indian Mutiny ==
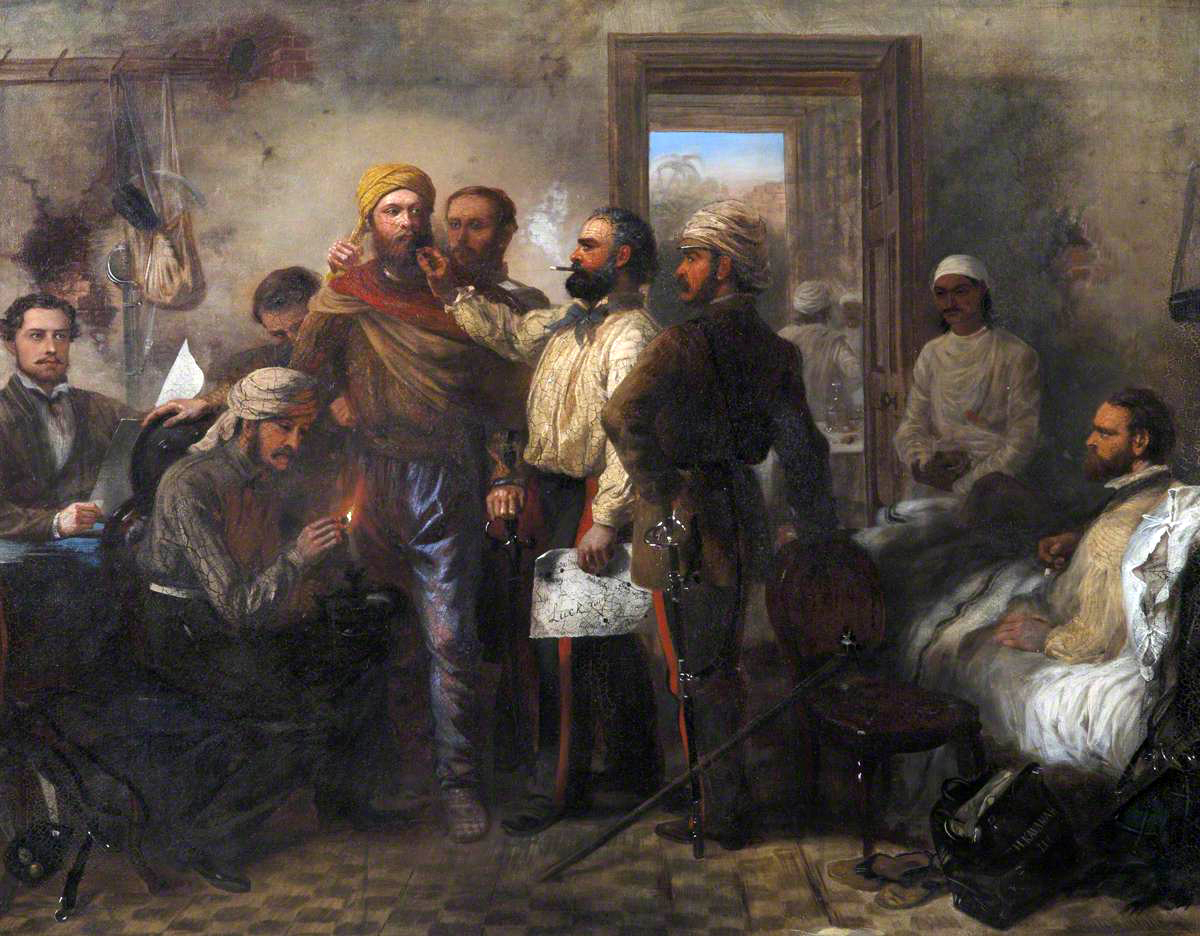
Kavanagh being disguised as a sepoy during the Siege of Lucknow

Kavanagh was a 36-year-old civilian in the Bengal Civil Service, an assistant commissioner in Oudh during the Indian Mutiny, when the following deed took place on 9 November 1857 at the Siege of Lucknow, India for which he was awarded the Victoria Cross:

Mr. Thomas Henry Kavanagh, Assistant Commissioner in Oude On 8 November 1857. Mr. Kavanagh, then serving under the orders of Lieutenant-General Sir James Outram, in Lucknow, volunteered on the dangerous duty of proceeding through the City to the Camp of the Commander-in-Chief, for the purpose of guiding the relieving Force to the beleaguered Garrison in the Residency, a task which he performed with chivalrous gallantry and devotion.

An erratum appeared in a later edition of the London Gazette stating that the deed was actually performed on 9 November as follows:

The Act of Bravery for which Mr Thomas Henry Kavanagh has been awarded the Victoria Cross, was performed on 9 November 1857, instead of 8 November, as stated in the London Gazette of 8 July 1859.

He was nicknamed by the British press as Lucknow Kavanagh.

Kavanagh was photographed with Montague Hall by Felice Beato.

He was an active freemason, and member of Morning Star No. 552 E.C.

== Later life ==
In addition to the Victoria Cross, Kavanagh was promoted to be an assistant commissioner in Oudh, and helped in the suppression of scattered mutineers.

Kavanagh died in Gibraltar on 13 November 1882, and is buried at North Front Cemetery, Gibraltar. He was one of only five civilians ever to be awarded the VC. His medal (and a first edition of his book, How I Won The Victoria Cross) was held for more than 50 years by HistoricalMilitaria.com in Toronto, Canada. The VC was sold at auction at Noonans Mayfair on 14 September 2022 for a record hammer price of £750,000.

== Sources ==
- Kavanagh, T. H. (1860). How I Won The Victoria Cross. London: Ward & Lock.
- The Register of the Victoria Cross (1981, 1988 and 1997)
- Clarke, Brian D. H. (1986). "A register of awards to Irish-born officers and men". The Irish Sword. XVI (64): 185–287.
- Ireland's VCs. Belfast: Research Department, Farset Youth and Community Development. 1995. ISBN 1-899243-00-3.
- Harvey, David (1999). Monuments to Courage.
- Doherty, Richard; Truesdale, David (2000). Irish Winners of the Victoria Cross.
