= Montague Hall =

Montague Hall (27 August 1831 - 12 March 1904), was a British officer during the Indian Rebellion of 1857.

== Biography ==
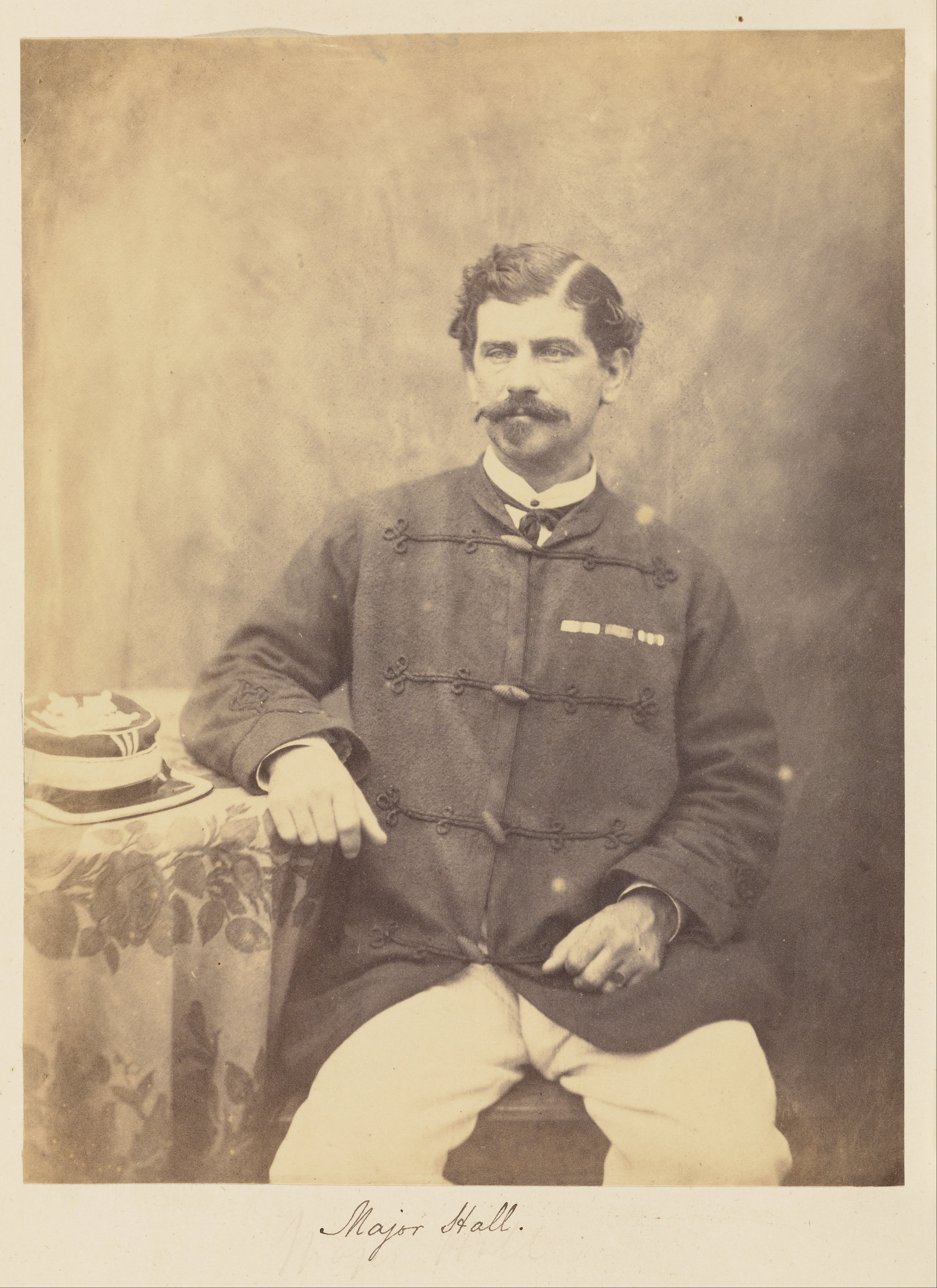
Hall photographed by Felice Beato

Montague Hall was born on 27 August 1831 in Bristol.

=== Military history ===
Hall served in the Second Anglo-Burmese War, and then as field engineer with the 1st Bengal European Fusiliers under Henry Havelock at the Siege of Lucknow during the Indian Rebellion of 1857. In 1858 he returned to Kanpur with Lord Clyde and was put back on regimental duty. Hall joined the 101st Royal Bengal Fusiliers in 1861 and retired as honorary colonel on 13 June 1883.

=== Personal ===
Hall was a photographer and was himself photographed with Thomas Henry Kavanagh by Felice Beato.

== Death and legacy ==
Hall died on 12 March 1904. His collection of 99 items is kept in the National Army Museum, London.
