= Piddletrenthide Hoard =

Roman coin hoard

Coordinates: 50.800°N 2.425°W

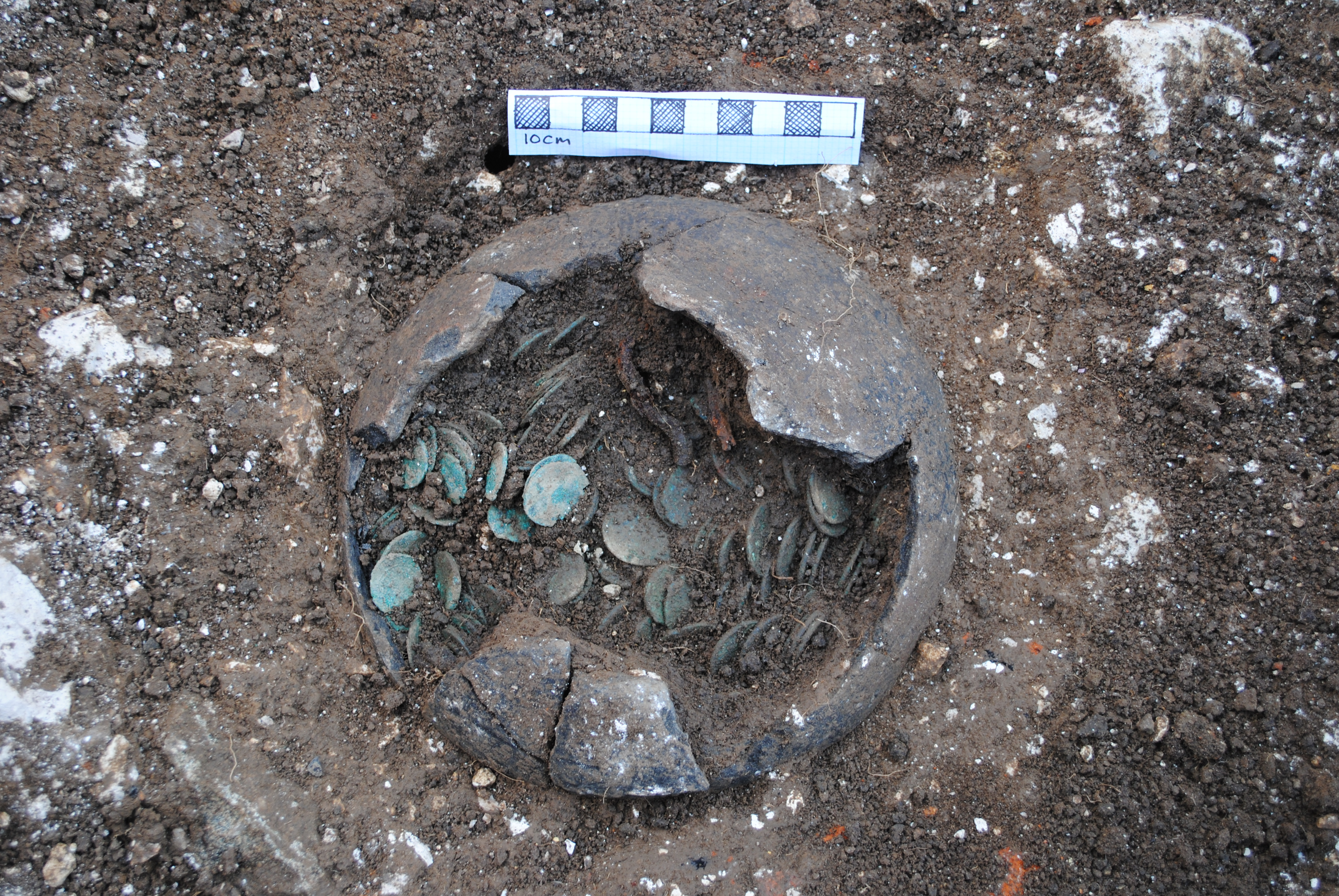
The Piddletrenthide hoard in situ.

The Piddletrenthide Hoard is a Roman coin hoard dating from the 3rd century AD, found near Piddletrenthide, Dorset. It consisted of 2,114 base silver radiates found in a pottery vessel. The coins date to between 253 and 296 AD.

The hoard was found by metal detectorist Brian Read in 2016. It was lifted up with the block of soil in which it was buried and taken to the British Museum for study.

== See also ==
- List of Roman hoards in Great Britain
