= St Albans Hoard =

Coin hoard discovered in 2012 in Hertfordshire, England

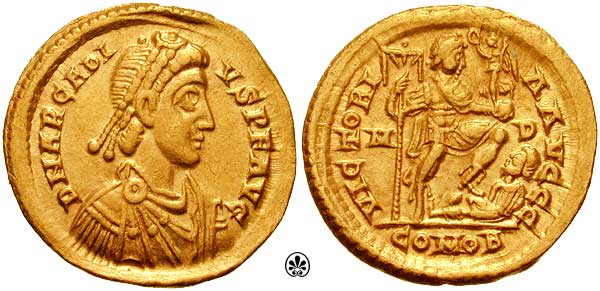
A solidus of Arcadius (r. 383–408) from the Mediolanum mint, of similar type to those found in the St Albans hoard

The St Albans Hoard is a large hoard of late Roman gold coins found by a metal detectorist in a field near St Albans, Hertfordshire, England in 2012. It is believed to be one of the largest hoards of Roman gold coins ever found in Britain. The hoard consists of 159 solidi dating from the last decades of the fourth century AD, near the end of the Roman occupation of Britain. After about 408, new Roman coins ceased to circulate in Britain, causing the collapse of the monetary economy and of mass-production industry.

Most of the coins came from the imperial mints in Mediolanum (Milan) and Ravenna in Italy. They were struck during the reigns of the Emperors Gratian, Valentinian II, Theodosius I, Arcadius and Honorius. The coins were found on private land to the north of St Albans by Westley Carrington from Berkhamsted who had just bought a beginner's metal detector from a shop in the town. He discovered 40 of the coins and brought them back to the shop to ask what he should do with them. The shop's owners reported the find to the local finds liaison officer and went back to the field at the beginning of October 2012 to continue the search. 119 more coins were found, bringing the total to 159. It is thought that they would have been deposited in an organic container such as a wooden box or cloth bag which has now decayed, as no other artefacts were found in conjunction with the coins. They were found scattered across an area of about 15 metres (49 ft). Their distribution was probably due to quarrying or plough action in the last 200 years, perhaps as recently as the Second World War, when the area was last used to cultivate crops.

According to curator David Thorold of the Verulamium Museum in St Albans, coins were usually buried either for religious reasons – as a sacrifice to the gods – or to keep wealth safe in the event of a potential threat to the owner's safety, such as war or unrest. The find of such a large hoard of solidi is unusual, as the coins were not in regular use due to their very high value. They effectively served as a guarantee of lower-value coinage in bronze and silver, quantities of which could be exchanged for solidi. In practice, those holding and using the coins were members of the economic and social elite such as wealthy merchants, landowners and soldiers receiving bulk pay. They would have used the solidi for high-value transactions such as buying land or bulk purchases of goods. The coins are in very good condition and do not appear to have been in general circulation.

The hoard probably dates to a little earlier than the larger Hoxne Hoard, found in Suffolk in 1992, which included 569 gold solidi and nearly 15,000 other coins. It is not the first hoard found near St Albans, which was the site of the major Roman town of Verulamium. In 1932, a hoard of 2nd-century silver denarii was found at Beech Bottom Dyke.

The find is covered by the Treasure Act 1996, which requires an independent panel of experts from the British Museum to examine the coins and make a report to a local coroner to determine whether they should be considered treasure trove. The coins were bought by the local council for £98,500 in 2015. The hoard is now on display at the Verulamium Museum.

== See also ==
- List of Roman hoards in Britain
