= Boston Spa hoard =

Hoard of Roman coins found in West Yorkshire, UK

Coordinates: 53.900225°N 1.3348968°W

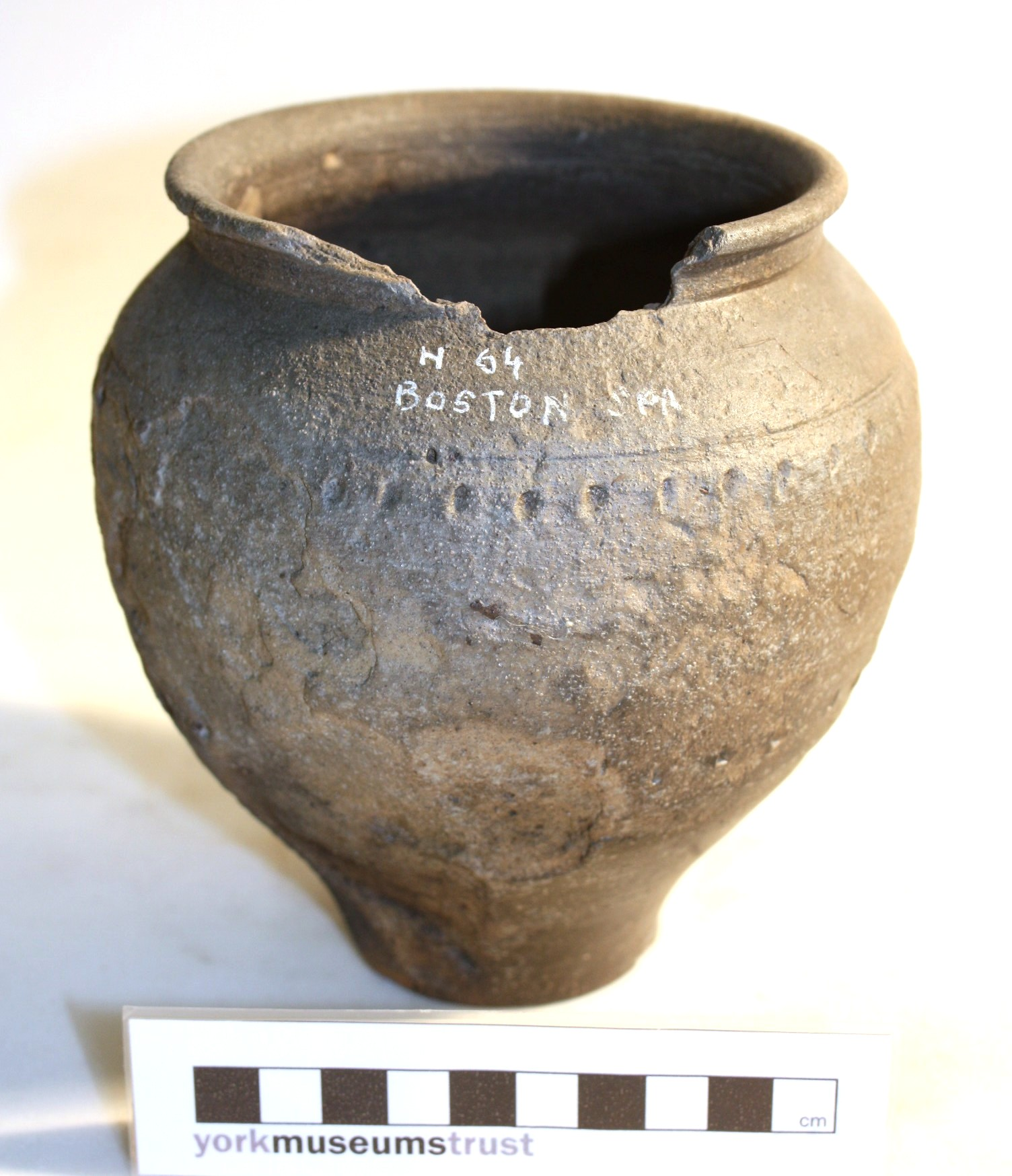
- The grey ware vessel from the hoard
- Material: Roman coins Roman pottery
- Size: 172 coins
- Created: Shortly after AD355
- Period/culture: Romano-British
- Discovered: 1848; Boston Spa, West Yorkshire, England
- Present location: Yorkshire Museum, York
- Identification: YORYM : H64

The Boston Spa hoard is a Romano-British hoard of 172 coins in a ceramic vessel found near Boston Spa in 1848.

== Discovery and description ==
The hoard was found in Boston Spa in 1848 during the construction of foundations for a new building.

It comprises a ceramic grey ware jar and 172 silver denarii. The coins date from 211 BC to the reign of the Emperor Hadrian (AD 119–122). They are, thus, likely to have been deposited in the 2nd-century AD. The hoard was purchased by the Yorkshire Museum in 1880.

== Public display ==
The hoard was loaned to Leeds City Museum in February 2022 as part of their exhibition on coin hoards titled "Money Talks". It was displayed alongside other hoards including the Cridling Stubbs Hoard and the Temple Newsham Hoard.
