= Constantinian bronzes =

Series of bronze coins

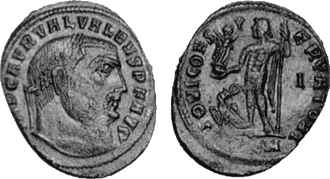
An AE3 coin of Valerius Valens.

In numismatics, the term Constantinian bronzes denotes the series of bronze coins issued in the Roman Empire in the middle of the 4th century. The specific denominations are unclear and debated by historians and numismatists. They are referred to as AE1, AE2, AE3, and AE4, with the former being the largest (near 27 mm) and the latter the smallest (averaging 15 mm) in diameter:

AE1	AE2	AE3	AE4
over 25 mm	21 – 25 mm	17 – 21 mm	under 17 mm

In November 2013, the largest hoard of Constantinian bronze coins was discovered in Devon, England. Called the Seaton Down Hoard, it consists of 22,000 coins, mostly Constantinian bronzes.

== See also ==
- Roman currency
- Follis
