= Upchurch =

Village in Kent, England

Coordinates: 51.3770°N 0.6503°E

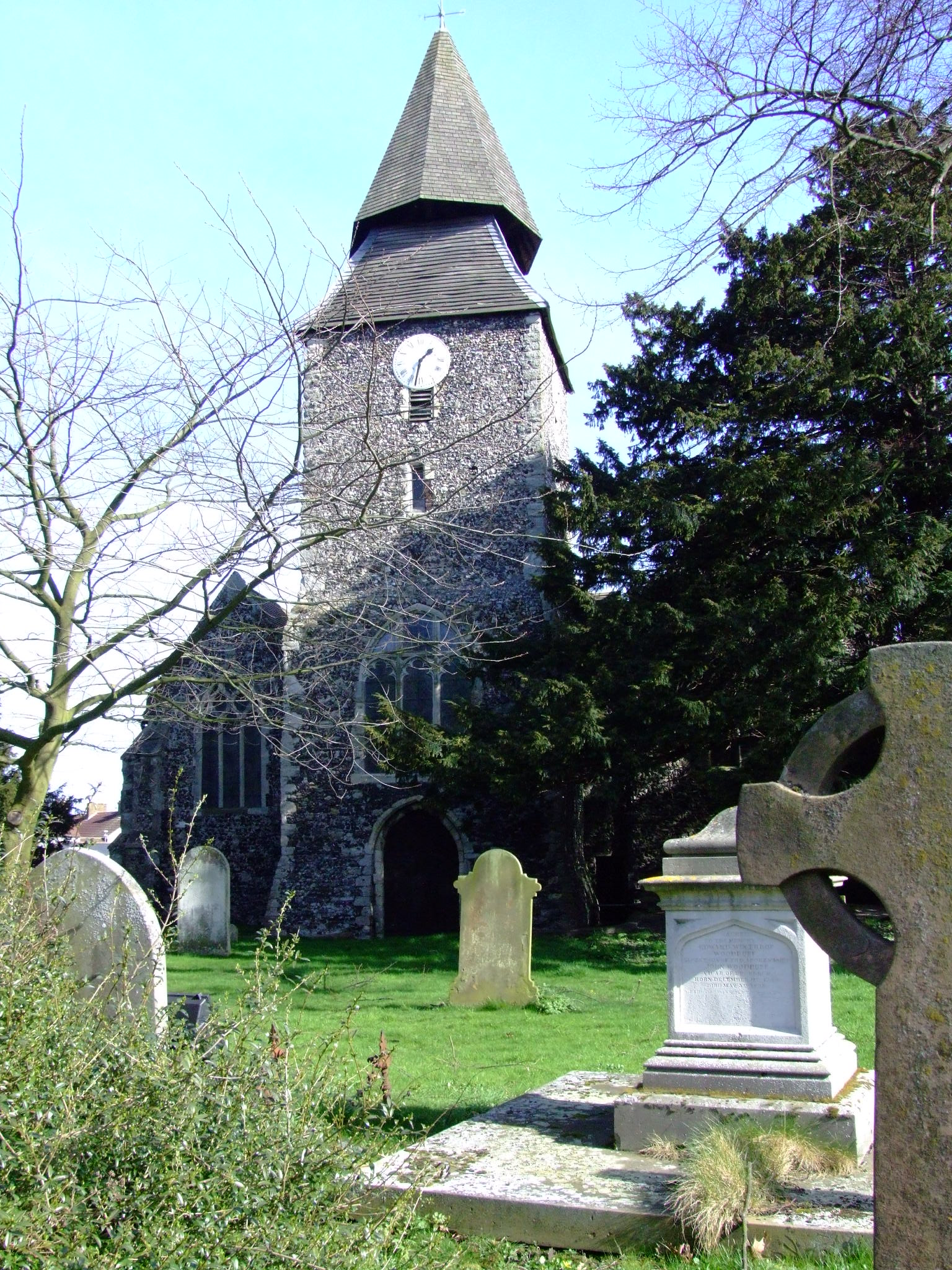
- The church of St Mary the Virgin, with unusual steeple

- Location within Kent
- Population: 2,484 (2011 Census)
- OS grid reference: TQ843675
- District: Swale
- Shire county: Kent
- Region: South East
- Country: England
- Sovereign state: United Kingdom
- Post town: Sittingbourne
- Postcode district: ME9
- Dialling code: 01634
- Police: Kent
- Fire: Kent
- Ambulance: South East Coast
- UK Parliament: Sittingbourne and Sheppey

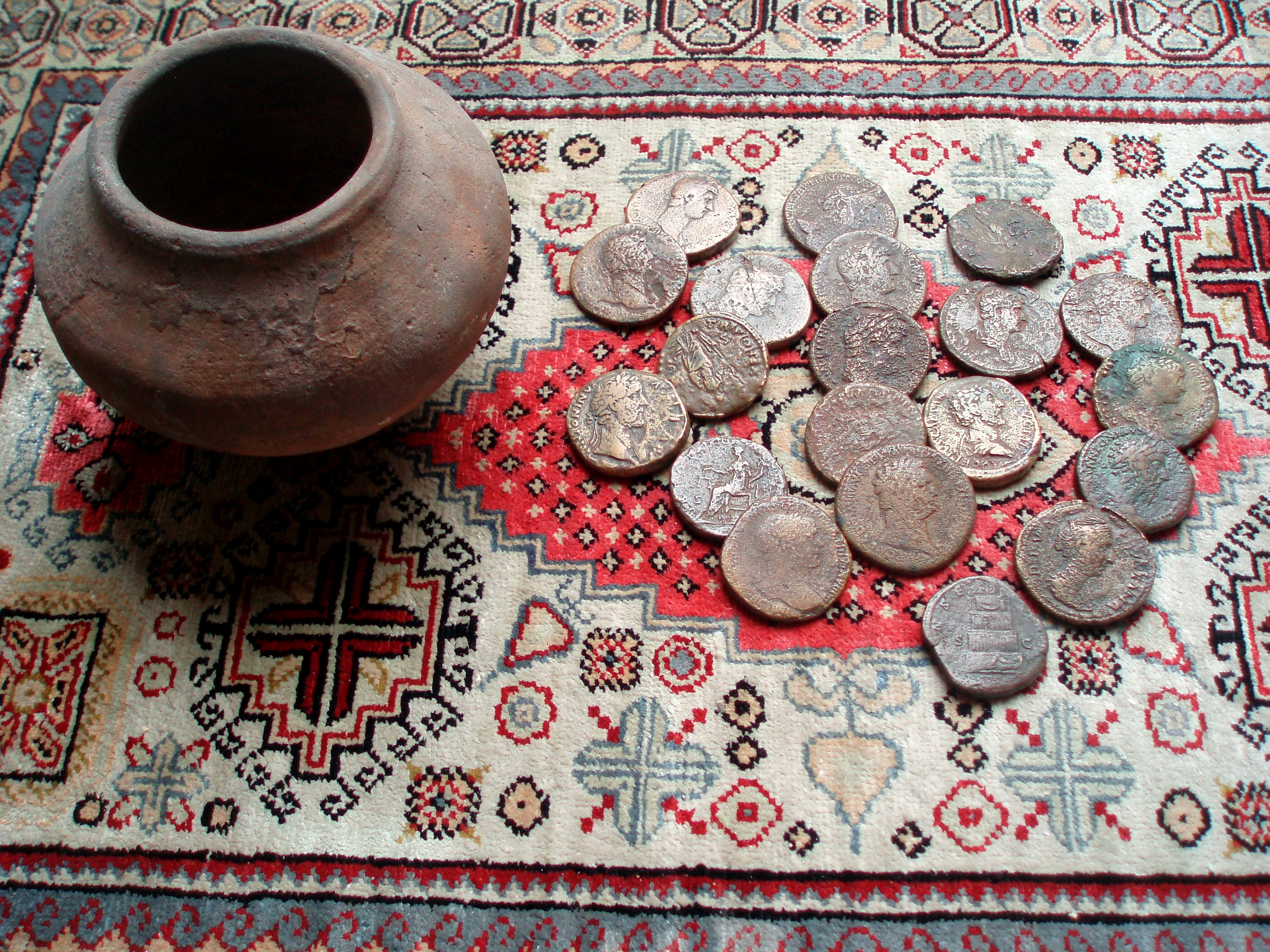
The Upchurch Hoard at the British Museum

Upchurch is a village and civil parish in the Swale district of Kent, England. It is situated about 2 kilometres (1.2 mi) north of the A2 road, between Rainham and Sittingbourne.

== History ==
It is probable that, although today the land is low-lying and marshy, it was once higher than it is today.

Upchurch lay on a pre-Roman trackway; the many linking roads are the result of Roman occupation, which had built a community of ex-soldiers who wanted to settle in England. A Roman cemetery has been discovered here. It is also the site of several Roman pottery works. A more recent pottery was established here in 1909 called the Upchurch Pottery. It became well known and could be found retailing through such outlets as Liberty & Co. It closed in 1963.

The Upchurch Hoard is a hoard of well worn coins which date from the first and second century A.D. which were found close to Upchurch in 1950.

Under the grade I listed 14th century church is a small crypt (a charnel house) where bones were kept when the churchyard was full. It was discovered in 1877 and the bones re-interred. The church is also notable for its very unusual 'candle-snuffer' steeple where an octagonal pyramid appears to have been stacked on top of a square one resembling a couple of inverted ice-cream cones. It is believed that the distinctive shape was chosen to serve as a navigational aid for shipping on The River Thames. The wall surrounding the church was found in 2014 also to be listed within the church grade one status.

In 2008 residents with the aid of a National Lottery grant collected and published a book Upchurch in old picture postcards. The project, to collect and maintain photographs that reflected changing village life, continues under the heading, the Upchurch Collection.

The settlement of Otterham Quay lies a mile west of the village at the head of Otterham Creek. This small port gave young Francis Drake his first experience of the sea. When the last brick field was given planning permission for development, a publication Otterham, Kent: Your Heritage was produced. The book wanted to record the heritage of the area ahead of new housing.

=== Train that jumped the gap ===
On 16 August 1944 a V-1 flying bomb exploded and destroyed the rail bridge over Oak Lane, directly ahead of a London Victoria to Ramsgate express train that was unable to stop. The locomotive made it to the far side of the bridge the remainder of the train did not. Eight people were killed and 61 others injured, 33 seriously. Due to wartime restrictions little detail about the accident was initially allowed to be published, but the Daily Mirror reported the story on 14 September under the title "Train that Jumped the Gap".

== Twinning ==
Upchurch is twinned with the Commune of Ferques, Pas de Calais, France.
