= Benington =

Benington may refer to:

- Benington, Hertfordshire, England, a village and parish
- Benington, Lincolnshire, England, a village and parish
- John Benington (1921–1969), American basketball coach
- Walter Benington (1872–1936), British photographer

== See also ==
- Bennington (disambiguation)
