= Bennington Township =

Bennington Township may refer to:

- Bennington Township, Marshall County, Illinois
- Bennington Township, Michigan
- Bennington Township, Mower County, Minnesota
- Bennington Township, Licking County, Ohio
- Bennington Township, Morrow County, Ohio
