= Piddletrenthide =

Village in Dorset, England

Coordinates: 50.799°N 2.423°W

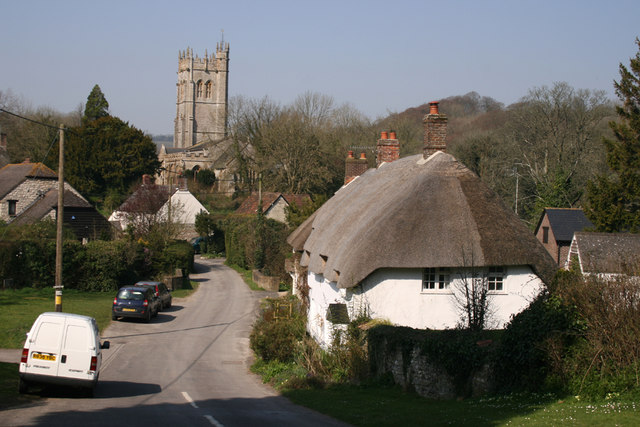
- Piddletrenthide

- Location within Dorset
- Area: 25.54 km^{2} (9.86 sq mi)
- Population: 647 (Parish, 2011)
  - Density: 25/km^{2} (65/sq mi)
- OS grid reference: ST703000
- Unitary authority: Dorset
- Ceremonial county: Dorset
- Region: South West
- Country: England
- Sovereign state: United Kingdom
- Post town: Dorchester
- Postcode district: DT2
- Police: Dorset
- Fire: Dorset and Wiltshire
- Ambulance: South Western
- UK Parliament: West Dorset

Piddletrenthide ( /ˌpɪdəltrɛntˈhaɪd/) is a village and civil parish in the English county of Dorset. The village lies on the small River Piddle in a valley on the dip slope of the Dorset Downs, 8 miles (13 km) north of Dorchester. In the 2011 census the parish—which includes the small village of Plush to the northeast and the hamlet of White Lackington to the south—had 323 dwellings, 290 households and a population of 647.

== Toponymy ==
The unusual name of the village is derived from its position on the River Piddle, combined with it having been assessed for thirty hides in the Domesday Book. The name sometimes prompts amusement and discussion, and references have been made to it in the TV Times (25 April – 1 May 1970), The Times (a lengthy correspondence in 1974, then again on 27 March 1999), The Sunday Times ( 22 December 2002 and 25 September 2005), and The Guardian (8 May 2004).

== History ==
In 1086 in the Domesday Book Piddletrenthide was recorded as Pidrie; it had 70 households, 17 ploughlands, 16 acres (6.5 ha) of meadow, three mills and a taxable value of 30 geld units. It was in Cerne, Totcombe and Modbury Hundred and the tenant-in-chief was Winchester Abbey. The manor's estate was one of the largest in the county.

A Benedictine cell (i.e., a very small monastic establishment) existed here in the Middle Ages. Its date of foundation is unknown. It was dissolved in 1354, and its chapel demolished shortly after 1382. There are no physical remains and its location within the parish is unknown.

Piddletrenthide's common arable fields were enclosed by Act of Parliament in 1817.

In 1933 Piddletrenthide parish was enlarged by 816 acres (330 ha) to include the small village and tithing of Plush, which previously had been a detached part of the parish of Buckland Newton a few miles to the north.

=== All Saints parish church ===
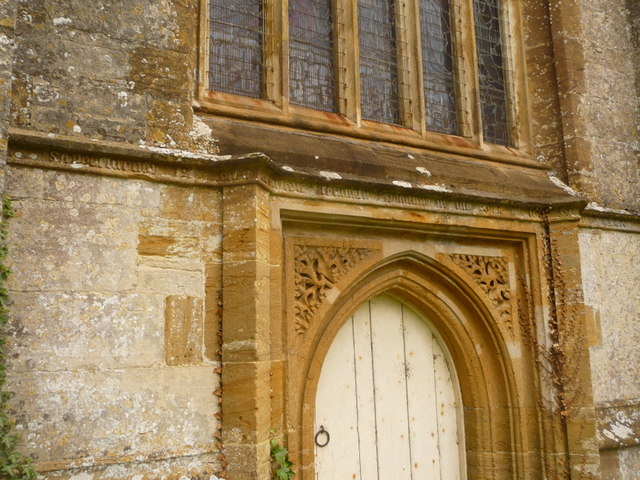
Latin inscription on the tower of All Saints parish church

All Saints parish church, situated on the northern edge of the village, has a claim to being one of the finest village churches in Dorset. The south doorway and piers of the chancel arch are Norman; the doorway inside the porch features typically Norman zigzag decoration. The tower dates from 1485 and has bell openings, pinnacles and gargoyles. The nave and aisles are also 15th-century. Over the west door of the church-tower is the Latin inscription: "Est pydeltrenth villa in dorsedie comitatu Nascitur in illa quam rexit Vicariatu 1487". The inscription translates as: "It is in Piddletrenthide, a town in Dorset [where] he was born [and] is Vicar, 1487."

In 1852 the building was restored, and the walls raised by John Hicks, brother of the then vicar. Hicks went on to restore and build more than 27 churches in the county. Ewan Christian redesigned the chancel in 1880. There are Victorian memorials. In the churchyard are two headstones marking the graves of members of the Durbefield family, a family later referenced by Thomas Hardy in his 1891 novel Tess of the d'Urbervilles.

The church is part of the benefice of the Piddle Valley, Hilton, Cheselbourne and Melcombe Horsey.

== Geography ==
Piddletrenthide civil parish covers 5,313 acres (2,150 ha) in the Dorset Downs in central Dorset. The parish comprises two distinct settlements: Piddletrenthide village in the valley of the River Piddle, and the smaller Plush in a side valley to the northeast. Piddletrenthide village is divided into three tithings: Higher, Middle and Lower. The church and manor house are the higher tithing, a group of cottages form the middle, and the third is known as White Lackington, which is a little separate from the other parts and is close to neighbouring Piddlehinton. White Lackington is between about 85 and 100 metres (279 and 328 ft) above sea-level, with the rest of Piddletrenthide village being between about 95 and 115 metres (312 and 377 ft) and Plush between about 125 and 145 metres (410 and 476 ft).

At the northern end of the village, reached by a footpath from the Poachers Inn, is Morning Well (or Mourning Well), where several springs feed into the River Piddle. In his book Portrait of Dorset Ralph Wightman described it as where "springs bubble out of the base of a steep wooded hill into a shady pool.... It is an enchanted place, raising memories of holy wells and pagan groves."

== Culture, art and media ==
Scrumpy and Western artist Trevor Crozier wrote a song entitled "The Piddletrenthide Jug Band" for Dorset folk group The Yetties.

Piddletrenthide is the hometown of Jem Kellaway, one of the main protagonists in Tracy Chevalier's 18th-century-set novel Burning Bright.

In the 21st century the tenor John Hudson, formerly a principal with English National Opera, has performed in a series of annual concerts at All Saints parish church, with support provided by other musicians with local connections.

== Notable people ==
The BBC Radio broadcaster Ralph Wightman (1901–1971), English lecturer, journalist, author, and radio and television broadcaster, came from here. Wightman was the model for Kenneth Williams' country character Arthur Fallowfield and was noted in his radio broadcasts for his fine Dorset accent.

Classic winning racehorse trainer George Boughey grew up on the family farm in Piddletrenthide.

== See also ==
- Piddletrenthide Hoard
