= Pinnington =

Pinnington is an English surname. Notable people with this surname include:

- Edward Pinnington (1846–1921), Scottish art historian
- Geoffrey Pinnington (1919–1995), British newspaper editor
- Todd Pinnington (born 1973), Australian cricketer
