= Upchurch Hoard =

Coordinates: 51.4027°N 0.6731°E

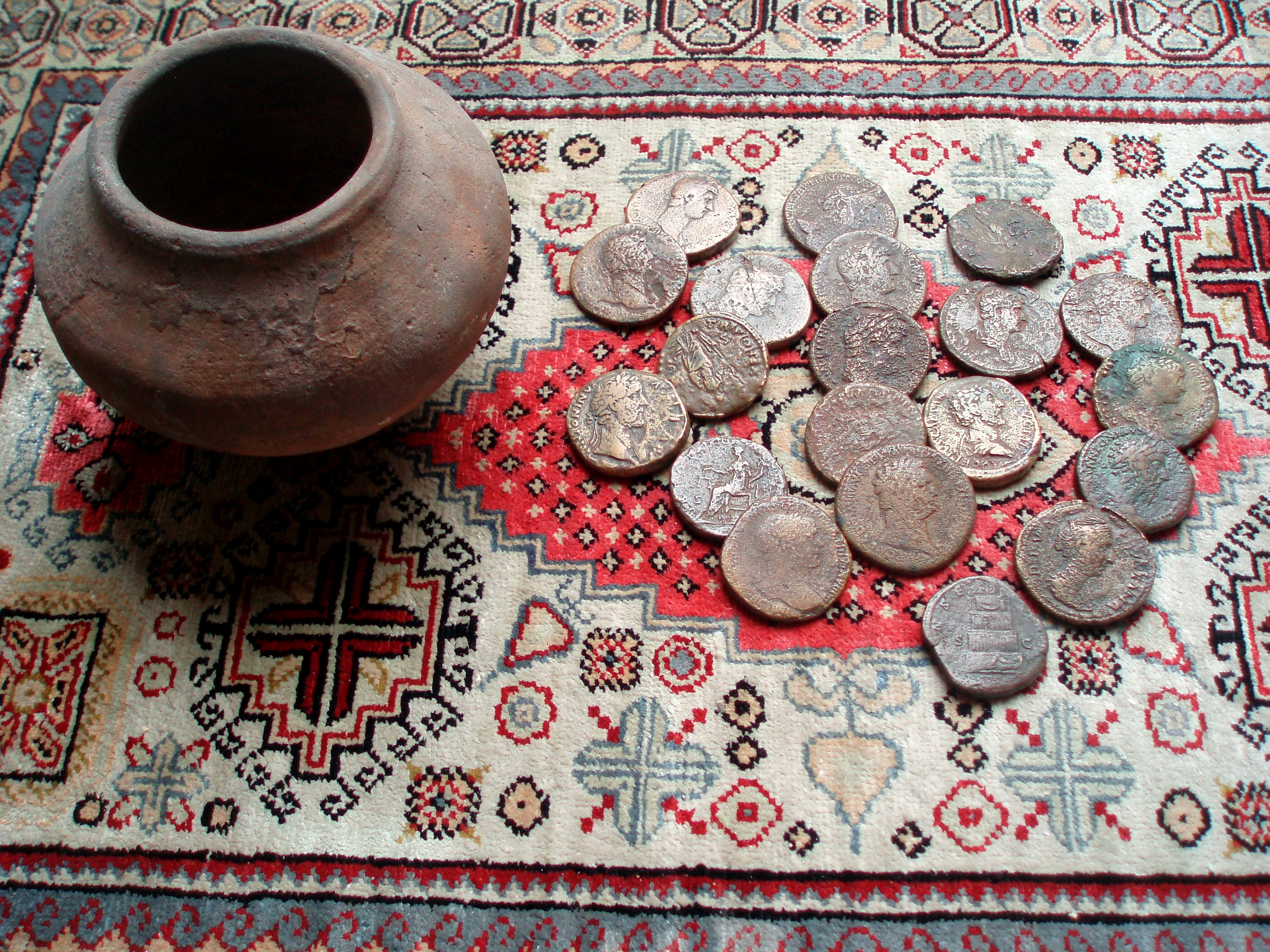
- The current state of the hoard
- Material: Bronze, pottery
- Size: 37 coins
- Period/culture: Romano-British
- Discovered: Upchurch, Kent in 1950

The Upchurch Hoard is a hoard consisting of 37 Roman sestertii, dating from the late 1st century to the second half of the 2nd century AD, found in a ceramic pot, near the village of Upchurch, Kent, England, in 1950.

== Detail ==
The Upchurch Hoard is a hoard of well worn coins that were found close to Upchurch in Kent, England. In the winter of 1950 a pot containing 37 Roman sestertii, dating from the late 1st century to the second half of the 2nd century AD, was found in the area known as Slay Hill Saltings or Marshes north-west of Upchurch. All the coins were fairly worn, indicating a long period of use, with the most recent Divus Aurelius and Faustina II in Very Fine condition, and those of Domitian and Trajan in Fine condition although some had corrosion and others with good surfaces. Judging from this, and the pot, which is a small bellied Olla, a type typical for the area, the hoard was probably concealed sometime in the early 3rd century. Seventeen of the original thirty-seven coins are now missing; the remaining twenty are as follows (all sestertii): Domitian 1, Trajan 3, Hadrian 8, Antoninus Pius 2, Elder Faustina 1, Marcus Aurelius 3, Divus Aurelius 1, Faustina II: 1.

== See also ==
- List of hoards in Britain
