= Cridling Stubbs =

Village and civil parish in North Yorkshire, England

Coordinates: 53.6872°N 1.2155°W

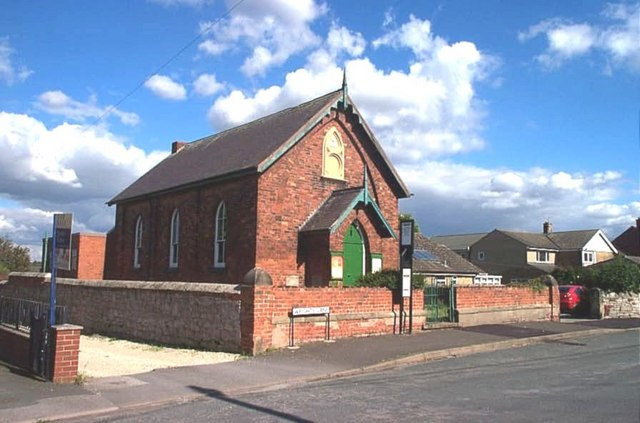
- Cridling Stubbs Village Hall

- Location within North Yorkshire
- Population: 152 (2011 census)
- Civil parish: Cridling Stubbs
- Unitary authority: North Yorkshire
- Ceremonial county: North Yorkshire
- Region: Yorkshire and the Humber
- Country: England
- Sovereign state: United Kingdom
- Post town: KNOTTINGLEY
- Postcode district: WF11
- Police: North Yorkshire
- Fire: North Yorkshire
- Ambulance: Yorkshire

Cridling Stubbs is a village and civil parish in North Yorkshire. It is near the town of Knottingley. In 2011 it had a population of 152.

The village was historically part of the West Riding of Yorkshire until 1974. From 1974 to 2023 it was part of the Selby District, it is now administered by the unitary North Yorkshire Council.

A Romano-British hoard of 3,330 coins in a jar (the Cridling Stubbs Hoard) dating to the 4th century AD was found near the village in 1967.
