= Bennington (surname) =

Bennington is a surname. Notable people with the surname include:

- Billy Bennington (1900–1986), English musician
- Chester Bennington (1976–2017), lead singer of rock bands Linkin Park and Dead by Sunrise
- Christina Bennington (born 1992), Northern Irish actress and singer
- Elisabeth Bennington (born 1976), American politician
- Geoffrey Bennington (born 1956), Professor of French and Professor of Comparative Literature at Emory University
- Jimmy Bennington (born 1970), American musician
- Ron Bennington (born 1958), co-host of the Ron and Fez radio show
- Seddon Bennington (1947–2009), New Zealand museum executive
