= USS Bennington =

Two ships of the United States Navy have been named Bennington, after the town of Bennington, Vermont. The Battle of Bennington occurred on 16 August 1777.

- USS Bennington (PG-4), was commissioned in 1891 and took possession of Wake Island during the Spanish–American War.
- USS Bennington (CV-20), was an aircraft carrier of World War II and decommissioned in 1970.
