= Shapwick Hoard =

Roman coins found in Somerset, England

Coordinates: 51.1517°N 2.8238°W

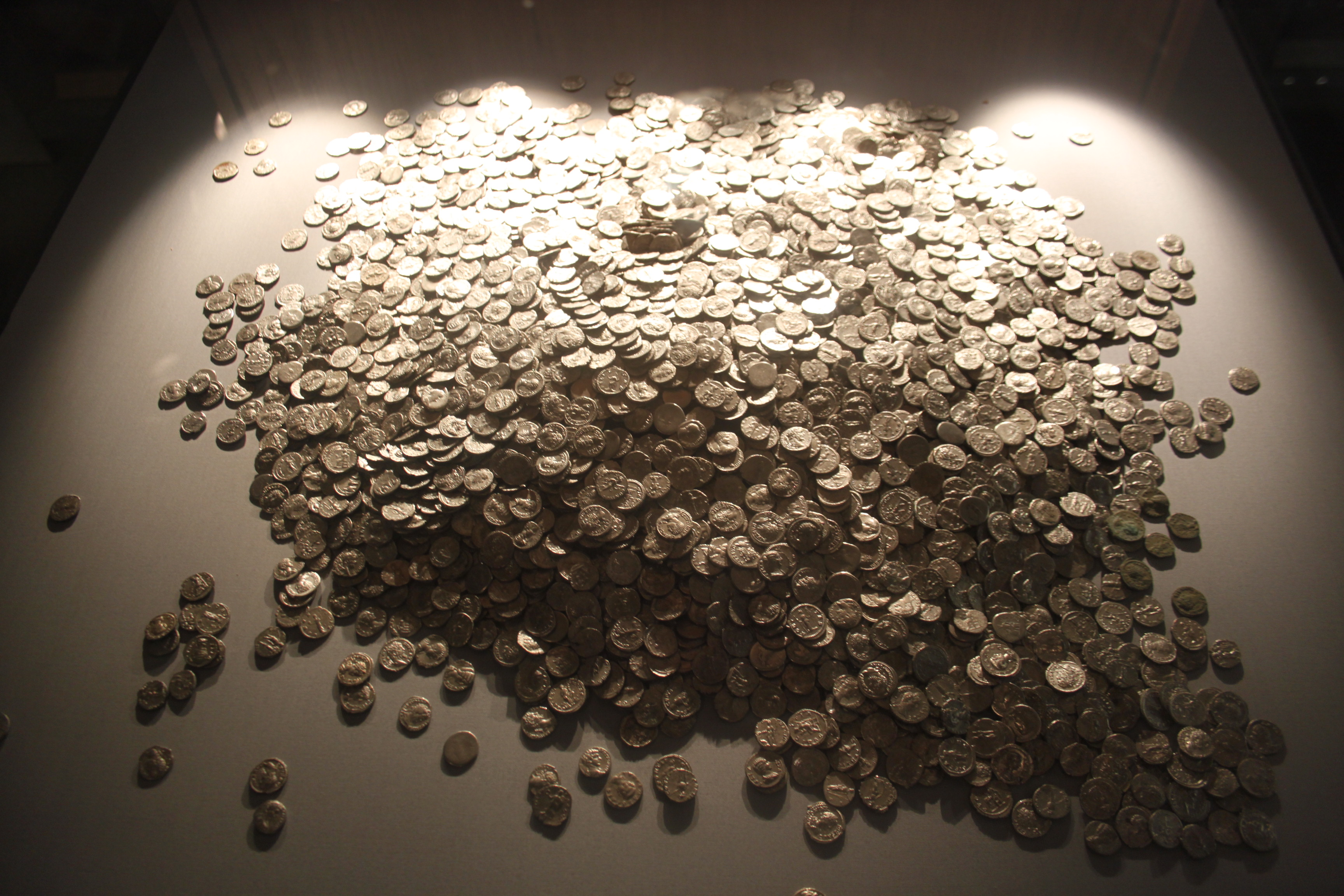
- Coins from the Shapwick Hoard on display at the Museum of Somerset
- Material: Coins
- Size: 9,262 coins
- Period/culture: Romano-British
- Discovered: Shapwick, Somerset by Kevin and Martin Elliott in September 1998
- Present location: Somerset County Museum, Taunton
- Identification: 1998–99 Fig 294.1–9; 2000 Fig 251

The Shapwick Hoard is a hoard of 9,262 Roman coins found at Shapwick, Somerset, England in September 1998. The coins dated from as early as 31–30 BC up until 224 AD. The hoard also notably contained two rare coins which had not been discovered in Britain before, and the largest number of silver denarii ever found in Britain.

== Discovery, excavation and valuation ==
The hoard was discovered by cousins Kevin and Martin Elliott, who were amateur metal detectorists, in a field at Shapwick. Excavation of the site found that it had been "buried in the corner of a room of a previously unknown Roman building" and, after further excavation and geophysical surveying, "revealed the room to be part of a courtyard villa".

Following a treasure inquest at Taunton, the hoard was declared treasure and valued at £265,000. Somerset County Museum Services acquired the hoard, with the aid of Somerset County Council, the National Heritage Memorial Fund, and other organisations, and it is now displayed at the Museum of Somerset in the grounds of Taunton Castle.

An addendum to the discovery was filed in the Treasure Annual Report 2000 which added a further 23 coins, valued at £690, also found by Kevin and Martin Elliott.

== Items discovered ==
Notable inclusions in the hoard were 260 coins from the reign of Mark Antony from 31 to 30 BC, with over half the coins being struck in the reign of Septimius Severus (193–211). There were also two rare coins not discovered in Britain before depicting Manlia Scantilla, the wife of Didius Julianus, an emperor who was murdered four weeks after the coins were struck. Non-Roman coins included were three Lycian drachmae and one drachma of Caesarea in Cappadocia. The latest coin struck was in 224 AD, and it is estimated that the hoard as a whole represented ten years' pay for a Roman legionary.

Reign	Date	No. of coins
Mark Antony	31 BC	260
Nero	54–68	44
Galba	68–69	12
Otho	69	9
Vitellius	69	30
Vespasian	69–79	548
Titus	79–81	69
Domitian	81–96	21
Nerva	96–98	12
Trajan	98–117	91
Hadrian	117–138	117
Antoninus Pius	138–161	567
Marcus Aurelius	161–180	171
Commodus	180–192	356
Septimius Severus	193–211	5,741
Caracalla	198–217	345
Macrinus	217–218	61
Elagabalus	218–222	688
Severus Alexander	222–235	120

== Other hoards ==
Shapwick has been the site of various hoard discoveries over the years, although the 1998 find was by far the largest.

- In 1868, fourteen coins from 306 to 361 were found in the Shapwick turbary and given to Glastonbury Museum in 1948.
- Between 1936 and 1938, four hoards were found in close proximity to each other:
  - Hoard A: a pewter cup, containing a pottery beaker of 120 mid-fourth to early-fifth century silver siliquae, along with a pewter saucer and platter
  - Hoard B: a pottery beaker inside a pewter jug containing 125 silver siliquae from the same era as Hoard A
  - Hoard C: a pewter canister containing around 1,170 bronze coins from 320 to 390, mostly of Valentinianic dynasty (364–375)
  - Hoard D: a bronze cased wooden stave tankard; a pewter bowl with pedestal; a bronze bowl. Estimated late fourth century
- In 1978, over 1,000 copper coins from 305 to 423 were found in a pewter vessel.

== See also ==
- List of hoards in Britain
