= Cridling Stubbs Hoard =

Coin hoard from North Yorkshire, England

The Cridling Stubbs hoard (also known as the Womersley Hoard or Womersley I)is a Romano-British hoard of more than 3,300 coins in a large, ceramic jar.

== Discovery ==
Parts of the hoard was discovered by Mr W Frost, a farmworker at Lodge Farm, Cridling Stubbs, on 8 October 1967. The site was subsequently excavated by RM Butler and Jeffrey Radley of the Royal Commission on the Historical Monuments of England on 16 October 1967, where further discoveries of coins were made. The jar was positioned upright in the ground and covered by part of a grey ware jar and a stone. The hoard did not count as treasure under the Treasure Trove law at the time, so ownership returned to the landowner, who sold the container and 447 coins to Leeds Museums & Galleries for £300. The purchase was supported by a grant from the Art Fund.

== Contents ==
The hoard comprises a ceramic jar of a calcite-gritted fabric dating to the 4th-century AD and over 3,300 bronze coins. The coins include denominations of Roman Emperors from Tetricus I to Constantius II. Fourteen of the coins were minted before AD 324, with the earliest dating to AD 270–275. the majority of the coins were struck between AD 330 and 346.

== Public display ==
The hoard was on display in Leeds City Museum from February to July 2018.

== Notes ==
1. Cridling Stubbs is in the parish of Womersley and it is given this name in the report by Pirie. Note that a second hoard of 4th-century coinage from this parish, found by metal detectorists in 2011, is named as Womersley II.
