= Binnington Carr Hoard =

Roman coin hoard found in North Yorkshire, England

Coordinates: 54.1981°N 0.44659°W

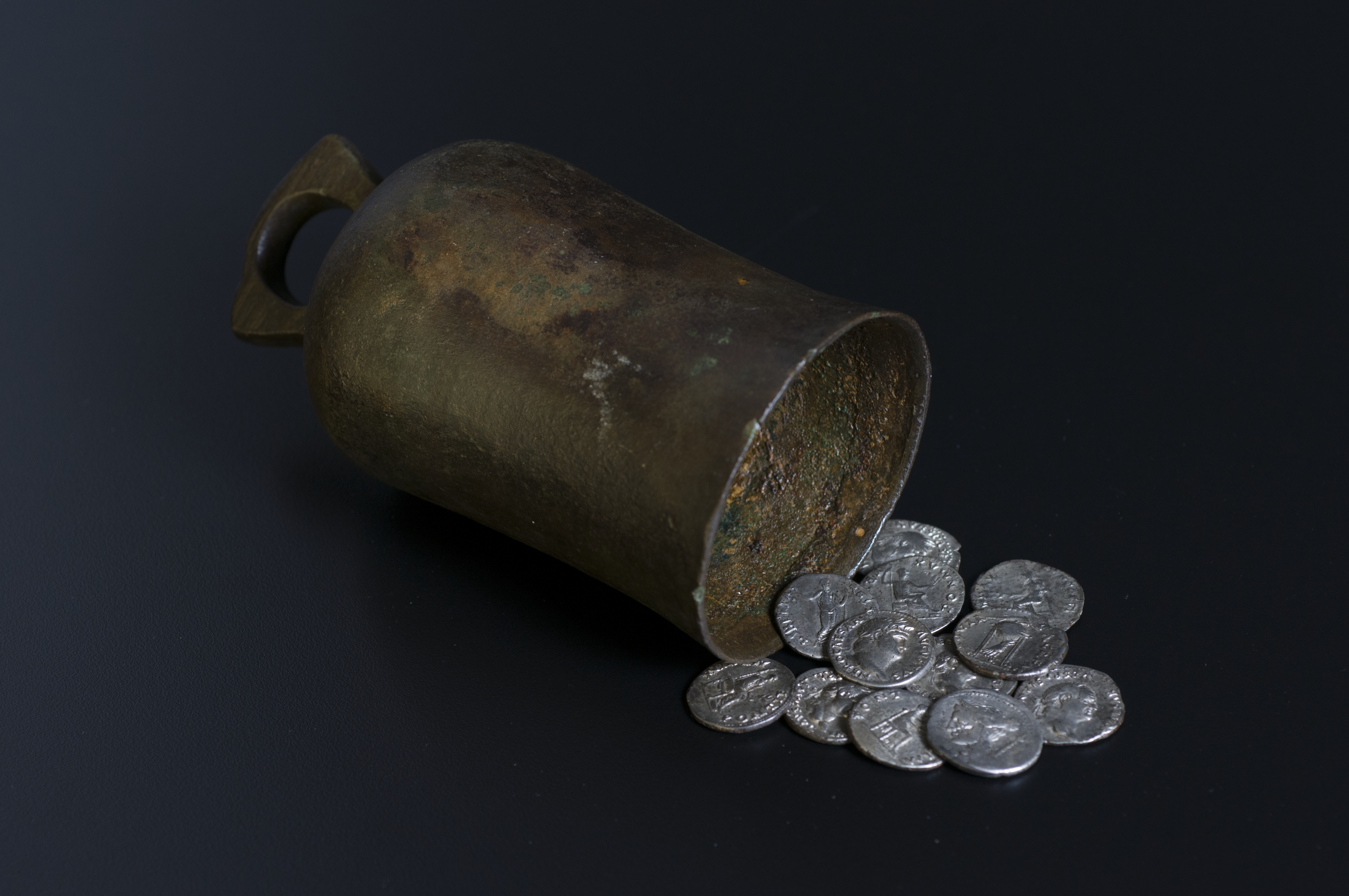
- The Binnington Carr Hoard
- Material: Roman coins Copper alloy bell
- Size: 12 coins
- Created: c. 75
- Period/culture: Romano-British
- Discovered: c.1876 Binnington Carr, near Willerby, North Yorkshire, England
- Present location: Yorkshire Museum, York
- Identification: YORYM : H2401

The Binnington Carr Hoard is a Roman coin hoard dating from the late 1st century AD. It contains 12 silver denarii within a copper alloy bell. It is in the collection of the Yorkshire Museum.

== Contents ==
The hoard contains 12 silver coins all of which are denarii: one of Julius Caesar (49-44 BC), one of Nero (AD 54-68), three of Vitellius (AD 68) and seven of Vespasian (AD 69-79).

== Display ==
In 2014 it featured in an online Google Arts & Culture exhibition titled 'Yorkshire Hoards'.
