= Seaton Down =

Iron Age hill fort site in Devon, England

Coordinates: 50.7212°N 3.0862°W

Seaton Down is the location of an Iron Age hill fort in Devon, England, that takes the form of an earthwork with a large linear rampart cutting a promontory of land at the northeast end of the down off as a defensive fortification. It is slightly unusual in this layout when compared with other forts in the area. The fort is approximately 125 metres (410 ft) above sea level.
