= Siliqua =

Roman silver coin

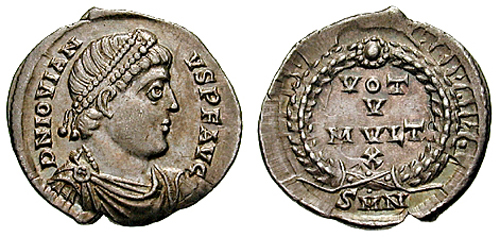
Jovian siliqua, c. 363. 18 mm and 2.2 grams.

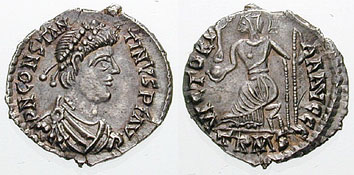
Constantine III

A siliqua (pl. siliquas or siliquae) is a small, thin, Roman silver coin produced starting in the 4th century.

The name siliqua is modern; its ancient name is unknown. The identification with the siliqua auri or keration was proposed by Theodor Mommsen in 1860, but this identification is now rejected.

The siliqua was a unit of weight equal to one twenty-fourth of a solidus. The word comes from the siliqua graeca, the seed of the carob tree (cf. carat), which in the Roman weight system is equivalent to 1/6 of a scruple (1/1728 of a Roman pound or about 0.19 grams).

The term has been applied since the 19th century to various silver coins on the premise that the coins were valued at 1/24 of the gold solidus (which weighed 1/72 of a Roman pound) and therefore represented a siliqua of gold in value. Since gold was worth about 12 times as much as silver in ancient Rome (in Diocletian's Edict on Maximum Prices of 301), such a silver coin would have a theoretical weight of 2.22 grams (12 × 4.45 g/24 = 2.22 g). The term is more generally applied today to silver coins issued by Constantine, which initially weighed 3.4 grams, and to the later "heavy siliqua" of Constantius II of c. 3 grams, but it would fit the later "light" or "reduced siliqua" from after the reform of 355 which weighed about 2.2 grams. Thin silver coins as late as the 7th century which weigh about 2–3 grams are known as siliquas by numismatic convention.

Most examples suffer striking cracks (from rapid production) or extensive clipping (removal of silver from the edges), so untouched and undamaged examples are uncommon.

== Late western issues ==
Siliquae of the late 4th and early 5th centuries were struck at a reduced weight standard in the western mints, including Mediolanum (Milan).

=== RIC X Honorius 1228 ===
One common type of Honorius, struck at Mediolanum in 395–402 and catalogued as RIC X 1228, bears the legend D N HONORI-VS P F AVG on the obverse, with a pearl-diademed, draped and cuirassed bust of the emperor facing right, and VIRTVS RO-MANORVM on the reverse, with the goddess Roma, helmeted and draped, seated left on a cuirass, holding a Victory on a globe in her right hand and an inverted spear in her left.

The type is exceptionally well attested: the CANOA catalogue records 4,796 specimens, making it the single most numerous coin type in that database, ahead of the related type RIC X Honorius 1227 (2,837 specimens). About 2,379 of these are held by the British Museum; smaller numbers are recorded by the Portable Antiquities Scheme (26), the Fitzwilliam Museum (9) and other collections.

The recorded weights of 1,682 specimens average 1.03 grams (ranging from 0.33 to 1.79 g), well below both the theoretical siliqua standard and the post-355 "reduced" standard of c. 2.2 grams, a consequence of the lowered western weight standard and of widespread clipping. Measured diameters average about 15 mm (12–18 mm).

=== Hoards and finds ===
Siliquae of Honorius form a substantial part of the silver hoards deposited at the end of Roman Britain, such as the Hoxne Hoard, which contained 14,212 siliquae struck down to his reign. The type RIC X 1228 is recorded by the Coin Hoards of the Roman Empire project in four hoards (as of November 2026): Kempston 1978 (England, 1 coin; the hoard contained 11 miliarenses and 2 siliquae), Norwich, near (England, 1 coin from a find of 12 siliquae), Mora de Rubielos (Spain, 1 coin from a find of 3 siliquae) and Allington 1869 (England, 13 coins from a find of 1 solidus and 53 siliquae). Single finds of the type are also recorded in England by the Portable Antiquities Scheme.

== See also ==
- Roman currency
- Hoxne Hoard, a hoard of 14,212 silver siliquas dating from the early 5th century.
