= Lists of hoards =

List of hoards may refer to:

- List of hoards in Britain
  - List of Bronze Age hoards in Britain
  - List of Iron Age hoards in Britain
  - List of Roman hoards in Britain
- List of hoards in Ireland
- List of hoards in the Channel Islands
- List of hoards in Romania
- List of hoards in Asia
- List of hoards in North America
