= 2012 in archaeology =

The year 2012 in archaeology involved some significant events.

== Explorations ==
- January - Discovery of a first-century farmhouse on the building site of the new stadium in the south of Marseille.

== Excavations ==
- June 6 - Excavators from Museum of London Archaeology announce that they have uncovered the remains of the Elizabethan Curtain Theatre in Shoreditch.
- August 24 - Philippa Langley in association with the Richard III Society, and Leicester City Council, engage University of Leicester Archaeological Services (ULAS), and announce that they have joined forces to begin a search for the site of Greyfriars, Leicester, burial place of King Richard III of England. On September 5 the excavators announce that they have identified the church. and on September 12 it is announced that a skeleton discovered during the search could have been that of Richard III, a supposition confirmed in 2013.
- October - Remains of substantial Mesolithic buildings are identified in Britain at Echline in Scotland, Lunt Meadows at Sefton, Merseyside and from new investigations at Starr Carr in North Yorkshire.
- December - Archaeologists complete excavation of a 900-seat Athenaeum from the time of the Emperor Hadrian in Rome discovered during work on a Metro line at Piazza Venezia.
- Excavation of working-class back-to-back houses from the Industrial Revolution period at Chapel Street in Salford, Greater Manchester, England.
- Excavations at Holt Castle in Wales begin.

== Finds ==
- January
  - The use of maize in Peru as early as 4700 BCE is confirmed.
  - Evidence for early Mayan tobacco use is published.
  - Discovery that the Vikings grew barley in Greenland.
- February 17 - Alabaster colossus of pharaoh Amenhotep III is discovered.
- March - Discovery of an inscribed doorjamb at Karnak giving the hitherto unknown titulary of pharaoh Senakhtenre Ahmose.
- March - A 7th century grave near Cambridge in England provides an early example of the transition from pagan Anglo-Saxon to Christian burial practices.
- March 30 - In Georgia, archeologists report unearthing jars containing what they believe to be the world's oldest honey.
- May - The oldest Mayan astronomical calendar discovered so far, from the 9th century, is reported from Xultun.
- May 9 - Archaeologists announce discovery on The Burren in Ireland of evidence of settlement from 6000 BCE.
- May 19 - The National Trust for Scotland announce that the first cursing stone to be found in the country, dated to circa 800, has been discovered on Canna.
- May 22 - The Bedale Hoard, a hoard of forty-eight silver and gold items dating from the late 9th to early 10th century AD is discovered in a field near Bedale, North Yorkshire by metal detectorists.
- June 25 - In the Channel Island of Jersey, the discovery of the Grouville Hoard of an estimated 30,000 – 50,000 Roman and Celtic coins by metal detectorists is announced.
- July
  - Discovery of 15th century underwear at Lengberg Castle in Austria is confirmed.
  - The wreck of the polar expedition ship Terra Nova is discovered off Greenland by the Schmidt Ocean Institute's research vessel Falkor.
- September - A beeswax filling is discovered in the cracked tooth of a Neolithic man in Slovenia.
- October - In Jersey, the Trinity Hoard of Bronze Age tools and weapons is discovered.
- November - 2,400-year-old golden treasure near the Thracian Tomb of Sveshtari, Bulgaria.
- December
  - Discovery near Canterbury, England, of a 1st-century Iron Age bronze helmet containing a bag of cremated human remains is announced.
  - The site of the mediaeval burgh of the town of Cromarty in Scotland, dating to at least the 12th century, is identified by local archaeologists after storms erode sections of the shoreline.
- Undated
  - Devunigutta Temple in India first reported.
  - Discovery of a rock inscription confirming the existence of Iry-Hor, the earliest ruler of Egypt known by name.
  - Cypriot pottery vessels excavated at Yehud in the land of Canaan (modern-day Israel) subsequently discovered to contain the earliest surviving evidence of opium for use as a narcotic.

== Events ==
- February - Completion of whole genome sequencing on Ötzi (d. c.3255 BCE) identifies his paternal DNA with Sardinia.
- July - Mausoleums and a mosque in Timbuktu (Mali) are deliberately attacked by rebels, a war crime for which Ahmad al-Mahdi in 2016 pleads guilty before the International Criminal Court.
- August - The Krak des Chevaliers is shelled by the Syrian Army.
- November - Study from the Kathu Archaeological Complex in South Africa suggests that hominids, possibly Homo heidelbergensis, may have developed the technology of hafted stone-tipped spears about 500,000 years ago.

== Deaths ==
- July 19: Brian Dobson, British archaeologist notable for work on Hadrian's Wall and the Roman Army (b. 1931)
- July 29: James Mellaart, British archaeologist. (b. 1925)

== See also ==
- List of years in archaeology
