= List of hoards in the Isle of Man =

The list of hoards in the Isle of Man comprises significant archaeological hoards of coins, jewellery, precious and scrap metal objects and other valuable items discovered in the Isle of Man. It includes both hoards that were buried with the intention of retrieval at a later date (personal hoards, founder's hoards, merchant's hoards, and hoards of loot), and also hoards of votive offerings which were not intended to be recovered at a later date, but excludes grave goods and single items found in isolation. The list is subdivided into sections according to archaeological and historical periods.

== Viking hoards ==
From the 9th to the 13th centuries the Isle of Man was part of the Viking-ruled Kingdom of the Isles, and several significant hoards from this period have been found on the Isle of Man. Viking hoards generally comprise a mixture of silver coins, silver jewellery and hacksilver that has been taken in loot.

Hoard	Image	Date	Place of discovery	Year of discovery	Current Location	Contents
Ballacamaish Hoard		10th century	Ballacamaish, Andreas, Isle of Man; Isle of Man; 54.1367°N 4.444°W	1870	British Museum, London	1 silver armlet 2 silver neck rings 1 silver finger ring
Ballaquayle Hoard	Selection of items from the Ballaquayle Hoard	late 10th century	Ballaquayle, Douglas; Isle of Man; 54.148°N 4.475°W	1894	Manx Museum, Douglas; British Museum, London	1 silver neck ring 1 gold arm ring 13 silver armlets 1 silver finger ring 2 silver thistle-headed brooch pins 78 Anglo-Saxon silver coins
Garff Hoard		10th century	Garff; Isle of Man; 54.25°N 4.40°W	2016	Manx Museum, Douglas	14 pieces of silver arm rings
Glenfaba Hoard		early 11th century	Glenfaba; Isle of Man; 54.213°N 4.660°W	2003	Manx Museum, Douglas	464 coins, 25 ingots and a broken armlet
February 2021 Hoard		mid 10th century	Isle of Man (exact location unknown)	2021	Manx Museum, Douglas	Various items of jewellery, including a gold arm ring, a large silver brooch, and a silver armband
July 2021 Hoard		early 11th century	Isle of Man (exact location unknown)	2021	Manx Museum, Douglas	87 silver coins minted in the Isle of Man, Dublin, England, and modern day Germany, and 13 pieces of hacksilver

== Later Medieval hoards ==
Hoards dating to the later medieval period, from 1066 to about 1500, mostly comprise silver pennies.

Hoard	Image	Date	Place of discovery	Year of discovery	Current Location	Contents
Ballaslig Coin Hoard		early 14th century	Ballaslig; Isle of Man; 54.135°N 4.514°W	1978	Manx Museum, Douglas	over 200 coins (mostly English sterling silver pennies)

== See also ==
- List of hoards in Great Britain
- List of hoards in Ireland
- List of hoards in the Channel Islands
- List of metal detecting finds
