= List of hoards in Asia =

The list of hoards in Asia comprises significant archaeological hoards of coins, jewellery, precious and scrap metal objects and other valuable items discovered in Asia. It includes both hoards that were buried with the intention of retrieval at a later date (personal hoards, founder's hoards, merchant's hoards, and hoards of loot), and also hoards of votive offerings which were not intended to be recovered at a later date, but excludes grave goods and single items found in isolation.

- Bactrian Gold
- Chausa hoard
- Kfar Monash Hoard
- Wonoboyo hoard
- Ziwiye hoard

== See also ==
- List of hoards in Britain
- List of hoards in the Channel Islands
- Lists of hoards
