= Émile Baraize =

French egyptologist (1874–1952)

- Born: 28 Aug 1874; Cossé-le-Vivien, Mayenne
- Died: 15 April 1952; Cairo
- Education: École nationale supérieure d'arts et métiers
- Known for: clearing of the Great Sphinx of Giza
- Awards: Chevalier de la Légion d'honneur

Egyptian Antiquities Service

Director of works
- In office 1912–1952
- Preceded by: Alessandro Barsanti

Émile Baraize (28 August 1874 – 15 April 1952) was a French Egyptologist.

== Life ==
In 1912 he succeeded Alessandro Barsanti as director of works within the Egyptian Antiquities Service. Throughout his life, he worked to restore and rebuild several ancient buildings, especially the Great Sphinx of Giza. From 1925 to 1936 he was involved in its restoration, which involved completely clearing away the sand from it, and directed excavations around it and inside it, in search of the rooms which many 19th-century Egyptologists believed lay within it. These excavations were hurried and had to be carried out with minimal equipment, but they did partially succeed in their objectives, for Baraize discovered a tunnel starting at the rump, which he explored before the entry was condemned.

In 1933, under his direction, a cache of Sarcophagi was discovered concealed under a Temple in El-Deir d'Bahari, belonging to a family of high priests of the 21st dynasty.
