= List of hoards in Ireland =

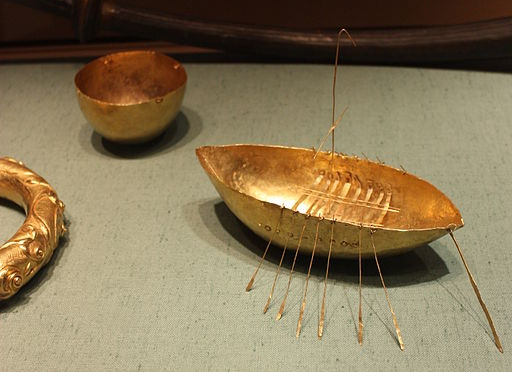
Gold models of ship and cauldron, torc, from the Broighter Hoard

The list of hoards in Ireland comprises the significant archaeological hoards of coins, jewellery, metal objects, scrap metal and other valuable items that have been discovered on the island of Ireland (Republic of Ireland and Northern Ireland). It includes both hoards that were buried with the intention of retrieval at a later date (personal hoards, founder's hoards, merchant's hoards, and hoards of loot), and also hoards of votive offerings which were not intended to be recovered at a later date, but excludes grave goods and single items found in isolation. The list is subdivided into sections according to archaeological and historical periods.

== Neolithic hoards ==
The table below lists hoards that are dated to the Neolithic period, approximately 4500 to 2500 BC.

Hoard	Image	Date	Place of discovery	Year of discovery	Current Location	Contents
Malone Hoard	16 porcellanite axes from the Malone Hoard		Danesfort House, Malone Road, Belfast; County Antrim; 54.571°N 5.945°W	1869–1918	Ulster Museum, Belfast	19 polished porcellanite axes

== Bronze Age hoards ==
The table below list hoards that are associated with the Irish Copper and Bronze Ages, approximately 2500 BC to 700 BC.

Hoard	Image	Date	Place of discovery	Year of discovery	Current Location	Contents
Ballinesker Hoard		8th century BC	Ballinesker; County Wexford; 52.396°N 6.359°W	1990	National Museum of Ireland, Dublin	2 gold dress fasteners 1 gold bracelet 2 gold disks 3 gold boxes
Ballytegan Hoard			Ballytegan; County Laois; 53.056°N 7.307°W	1967	National Museum of Ireland, Dublin	2 bronze axeheads, 1 bronze bracelet, and a number of bronze rings and pins
Coggalbeg Hoard		24th to 19th century BC	Coggalbeg; County Roscommon; 53.726°N 8.152°W	1945	National Museum of Ireland, Dublin	1 gold lunula 2 gold discs
Derrinboy Hoard		14th to 13th century BC	Derrinboy; County Offaly; 53.155°N 7.718°W	1957 or 1958	National Museum of Ireland, Dublin	1 gold necklet 2 gold armlets 2 gold rings
Dowris Hoard		9th to 7th century BC	Whigsborough, near Birr; County Offaly; 53.167°N 7.869°W	1825 or 1833	National Museum of Ireland, Dublin; British Museum, London	5 swords 44 spearheads 43 axes 26 horns 44 crotals 3 bronze buckets 1 cauldron
Kilmoyly Hoard		9th to 8th century BC	Kilmoyly North; County Kerry; 52.370°N 9.771°W	1940	National Museum of Ireland, Dublin	3 gold bracelets 1 gold dress-fastener
Mooghaun North Hoard		Late Bronze Age	near Mooghaun Fort, County Clare	1854	Mostly lost; 29 pieces in National Museum of Ireland and British Museum	Probably over 200 gold objects, mostly plain bar bracelets, with torcs, collars and ingots

== Iron Age hoards ==
The table below list hoards that are associated with the Irish Iron Age, approximately 700 BC to 400 AD.

Hoard	Image	Date	Place of discovery	Year of discovery	Current Location	Contents
Broighter Hoard	Boat from the Broighter hoard	1st century BC	near Limavady; County Londonderry; 55.073°N 6.984°W	1896	National Museum of Ireland, Dublin	1 gold model ship 1 gold model cauldron 2 gold neck chains 2 twisted gold torc necklets 1 hollow gold torc or collar
Dooyork Hoard		3rd century BC to 2nd century AD	Dooyork; County Mayo; 54.106°N 9.933°W	2001	National Museum of Ireland, Dublin	4 gold torcs 3 bronze bracelets 7 amber beads

== Roman hoards ==
The table below list hoards of Roman coins and silverware found in Ireland. There are very few Roman hoards in Ireland as it was never part of the Roman Empire, and those hoards that have been found are thought to have been looted from Britain by Irish raiders.

Hoard	Image	Date	Place of discovery	Year of discovery	Current Location	Contents
Balline Hoard		late 4th century	Balline; County Limerick; 52.399°N 8.455°W	1940	National Museum of Ireland, Dublin	4 silver ingots and 3 pieces of silver plate
Coleraine Hoard	Hack silver, ingots and coins from the Coleraine Hoard	early 5th century	Ballinrees; County Londonderry; 55.108°N 6.762°W	1854	British Museum, London; Ulster Museum, Belfast	1,701 silver Roman coins, a silver bowl, and 6 kg of silver ingots and hacksilver

== Early Medieval hoards ==
The table below lists hoards that are associated with the early medieval period, from the introduction of Christianity until the start of Anglo-Norman settlement, approximately 400 AD to 1100 AD.

Hoard	Image	Date	Place of discovery	Year of discovery	Current Location	Contents
Ardagh Hoard	The Ardagh chalice	early 10th century	Ardagh Fort; County Limerick; 52.495°N 9.062°W	1868	National Museum of Ireland, Dublin	1 silver chalice 1 bronze chalice 4 silver-gilt brooches.
Derrynaflan Hoard	The Derrynaflan chalice	early 10th century	near Killenaule; County Tipperary; 52.567°N 7.669°W	1980	National Museum of Ireland, Dublin	A set of liturgical vessels, comprising a silver chalice, a silver paten, a stand for the paten, a liturgical strainer, and a bronze basin.

== Viking hoards ==
The table below lists hoards that are associated with the Viking culture in Ireland.

Hoard	Image	Date	Place of discovery	Year of discovery	Current Location	Contents
Mullaghboden Hoard		mid 9th century	Mullaghboden; County Kildare; 53.140°N 6.658°W	1871		11 Carolingian coins

== Medieval hoards ==
The table below lists hoards that date to the late medieval period, from 1066 to about 1500.

Hoard	Image	Date	Place of discovery	Year of discovery	Current Location	Contents
Armagh City Hoard		late 14th century	near Armagh; County Armagh; 54.349°N 6.6546°W	1998	Ulster Museum	35 silver coins worth £1,800

== Post-Medieval hoards ==
The table below lists hoards that date to 1536 or later, following the reconquest of Ireland by Henry VIII of England. Most of these hoards date to the Elizabethan era (1558–1603), during which time the Nine Years' War (1594–1603) caused considerable instability throughout Ireland, but especially in Ulster.

Hoard	Image	Date	Place of discovery	Year of discovery	Current Location	Contents
Armagh Castle Street Hoard		late 16th century	Castle Street, Armagh; County Armagh; 54.347°N 6.656°W	1976	Ulster Museum, Belfast	135 Irish groats
Carrick-on-Suir Hoard		late 17th century	76 Main Street, Carrick-on-Suir; County Tipperary; 52.3458°N 7.4125°W	2013		81 gold guineas and half guineas dating from the reigns of Charles II, James II, William and Mary, and William III

== See also ==
- List of hoards in Great Britain
- List of hoards in the Channel Islands
- List of hoards in the Isle of Man
- List of metal detecting finds
