= List of hoards in the Channel Islands =

The list of hoards in the Channel Islands comprises significant archaeological hoards of coins, jewellery, precious and scrap metal objects and other valuable items discovered in the Channel Islands (Jersey, Guernsey, Alderney, Sark, Herm and associated smaller islands). It includes both hoards that were buried with the intention of retrieval at a later date (personal hoards, founder's hoards, merchant's hoards, and hoards of loot), and also hoards of votive offerings which were not intended to be recovered at a later date, but excludes grave goods and single items found in isolation. The list is subdivided into sections according to archaeological and historical periods.

At least fifteen hoards have been found in the Channel Islands since the early 18th century, most of them in Jersey, and only one each in Guernsey, Alderney and Sark. Of the known hoards, about a third date to the Bronze Age and are mostly founder's hoards comprising broken tools, weapons and other scrap metal buried with the intention of recovery at a later date for use in casting new bronze items. Another third are hoards of Iron Age Celtic coins, mostly coins called staters cast in debased silver (billon alloy), the majority deriving from Armorica (modern Brittany and Normandy in France), but some deriving from Southern Britain. The remaining hoards comprise Roman coins, some of which may have been buried by Armorican Celts fleeing from Roman armies during the campaigns of Julius Caesar in the mid 1st century B.C. Although the contents of most Iron Age and Roman hoards found in the Channel Islands originated from nearby France or Britain, one hoard that was discovered in Guernsey during the late 19th century comprised Roman coins minted in Alexandria in Egypt during the late 3rd century A.D.

== Bronze Age hoards ==
The table below list hoards that are associated with the Bronze Age, approximately 1300 BC to 700 BC.

| Hoard | Image | Date | Place of discovery | Year of discovery | Current Location | Contents |
|---|---|---|---|---|---|---|
| Cadoret Hoard | | ? | Saint Mary; Jersey; 49.2415°N 2.1820°W | 1995 | | Founder's hoard comprising 178 miscellaneous bronze items, including broken pieces of weapons, tools and ornaments, as well as casting debris |
| La Blanche Pierre Hoard | | ? | Saint Lawrence; Jersey; 49.2040°N 2.1500°W | 1976 | | 114 bronze items, mostly broken axes, spears and swords, in an urn |
| Mainlands Hoard | | ? | Saint Lawrence; Jersey; 49.2013°N 2.1483°W | 1871 | | Bronze items |
| Longy Hoard | | 9th century B.C. | Longy Common; Alderney; 49.723°N 2.175°W | 1832 | Guille-Allès Museum, Guernsey | Founder's hoard of about 200 bronze items, including axes, spear heads, sickles, chisels and bronze scraps |
| St Ouen's Hoard | | ? | Saint Ouen; Jersey; 49.2255°N 2.2090°W | 2002 | | 200 bronze items |
| Town Mill Hoard | | ? | Saint Helier; Jersey; 49.1952°N 2.1000°W | 1836 | 4 axes in the British Museum, London | 88 bronze axes, most miniature versions of an Armorican type |
| Trinity Hoard | | ? | Trinity; Jersey; 49.2350°N 2.0911°W | 2012 | | Pot containing tools and weapons, including 23 bronze axeheads |

== Iron Age hoards ==
The table below list hoards that are associated with the Iron Age, approximately 8th century BC to the 1st century AD.

| Hoard | Image | Date | Place of discovery | Year of discovery | Current Location | Contents |
|---|---|---|---|---|---|---|
| Grouville Hoard | Grouville Hoard while undergoing cleaning and investigation in 2012 | 1st century B.C. | Grouville; Jersey; 49.19°N 2.05°W | 2012 | In the hands of Jersey Heritage (not on display) | 30,000 – 50,000 late Iron Age Celtic and Roman coins, as well as some items of silver and gold jewellery |
| La Marquanderie Hoard | | mid 1st century AD | Saint Brélade; Jersey; 49.1875°N 2.1995°W | 1935 | | 10,547 Armorican coins, almost all issued by the Curiosolitae |
| Le Câtillon Hoard | | mid 1st century BC | Grouville; Jersey; 49.1946°N 2.0525°W | 1957 | Dispersed, but the La Hougue Bie Museum holds some coins | About 2,500 Armorican, Belgic and Southern British Iron Age coins, most billon staters issued by the Curiosolitae, as well as some pieces of jewellery, including fragments of a gold torque, several silver and bronze fibulae, a silver chain and some bronze rings |
| Rozel Hoard (1820) | | mid 1st century B.C. | Le Câtel, Rozel, Saint Martin; Jersey; 49.238°N 2.055°W | 1820 | the hoard was acquired by Baron de Donop in Coburg, who published the coin images; through the heirs, the coins went to various museums and collectors, including the Dresden coin cabinet (until 1945) | At least 982 Armorican billon staters, mostly issued by the Curiosolitae |
| Rozel Hoard (1875) | | mid 1st century B.C. (c. 40 B.C.) | Little Caesarea, Rozel, Saint Martin; Jersey; 49.237°N 2.048°W | 1875 | Mostly lost, some at the British Museum, London | Several thousand coins (drawings of 700 of them are known) |

== Roman hoards ==
The table below list hoards of Roman artefacts and Roman coins.

| Hoard | Image | Date | Place of discovery | Year of discovery | Current Location | Contents |
|---|---|---|---|---|---|---|
| Île Agois Hoard | | mid 3rd century | Île Agois, Saint Mary; Jersey; 49.249°N 2.182°W | | | 18 antoniniani, dated A.D. 253–268, in a pot |
| Jerbourg Hoard | | late 3rd century | Jerbourg Point, Saint Martin; Guernsey; 49.425°N 2.535°W | before 1890 | Dispersed | 68 tetradrachms minted in Alexandria during the reigns of the emperors Probus (4 coins), Carus (3 coins), Numerian (3 coins), Carinus (4 coins), Diocletian (34 coins) and Maximian (19 coins) |
| Quennevais Hoard | | mid 4th century | Les Quennevais, Saint Brélade; Jersey; 49.197°N 2.194°W | 1848 | Jersey Museum (264 coins) | About 400 coins in a pot, mainly Roman folles dated A.D. 290–354 |
| Sark Hoard | | 1st century B.C. | La Vaurocque; Sark; 49.430°N 2.365°W | 1719 | Lost | 18 Roman and Gaulish silver coins, a silver mount in the form of a dolphin, and 13 silver or silver-gilt phalerae in an iron-bound pottery urn |

== See also ==
- List of hoards in Great Britain
- List of hoards in Ireland
- List of hoards in the Isle of Man
- List of metal detecting finds
- History of Guernsey
- History of Jersey
