= List of metal detecting finds =

This is a list of historically significant items found by metal detecting method, only excluding magnet fishing finds, since magnet fishing is usually considered a distinctively different and separate hobby from traditional metal detecting.

== List ==
Item	Date	Place of discovery	Year of discovery	Current location
Ashdon Hoard	Viking Age	United Kingdom	1984	Fitzwilliam Museum
Bedale Hoard	9th to 10th century	United Kingdom	2012	Yorkshire Museum
Bredon Hill Hoard	3rd century	United Kingdom	2011	Worcester City Art Gallery & Museum
Chew Valley Hoard	11th century	United Kingdom	2019	British Museum
Collette Hoard	Bronze Age	United Kingdom	2005	Museum of Antiquities
Crosby Garrett Helmet	2nd or 3rd century	United Kingdom	2010	Undisclosed
Cunetio Hoard	Late antiquity	United Kingdom	1978	British Museum/Wiltshire Museum
Dairsie Hoard	3rd century	United Kingdom	2014	National Museum of Scotland
Derrynaflan Chalice	8th or 9th century	Ireland	1980	National Museum of Ireland
Escrick ring	5th to 6th century AD	United Kingdom	2009	Yorkshire Museum
Frome Hoard	253 to 305	United Kingdom	2010	Museum of Somerset
Fulford ring	15th Century AD	United Kingdom	2016	Yorkshire Museum
Furness Hoard	9th to 10th century	United Kingdom	2011	Dock Museum
Galloway Hoard	9th or 10th century	United Kingdom	2014	Pending matter (Scottish museums)
Grouville Hoard	Iron Age	United Kingdom	2012	La Hougue Bie
Hallaton Helmet	1st century	United Kingdom	2000	Harborough Museum
Hallaton Treasure	1st century	United Kingdom	2000	Harborough Museum
Hand of Faith	N/A	Australia	1980	Golden Nugget Las Vegas
Hoxne Hoard	4th or 5th century	United Kingdom	1992	British Museum
Huxley Hoard	900 to 910	United Kingdom	2004	Museum of Liverpool
Leekfrith torcs	400 to 250 BC	United Kingdom	2016	Potteries Museum & Art Gallery
Leominster hoard	Viking Age	United Kingdom	2015	Herefordshire Council Museum
Lenborough Hoard	11th century	United Kingdom	2014	British Museum
Middleham Hoard	1640s decade	United Kingdom	1993	Yorkshire Museum
Middleham Jewel	15th century	United Kingdom	1985	Yorkshire Museum
Milton Keynes Hoard	Bronze Age	United Kingdom	2000	British Museum
Mojave Nugget	N/A	United States	1977	Natural History Museum of Los Angeles County
Newark Torc	200 to 50 BC	United Kingdom	2005	Millgate Museum
Peebles Hoard	1000 BC to 900 BC	United Kingdom	2020	N/A
Ringlemere Cup	Bronze Age	United Kingdom	2001	British Museum
Rogiet Hoard	253 to 296	United Kingdom	1998	National Museums and Galleries of Wales
Saddle Ridge Hoard	1847 to 1894	United States	2013	Undisclosed
Saka Hoard	11th or 12th century	Estonia	2015	N/A
Seaton Down Hoard	260 to 348	United Kingdom	2013	British Museum
Shapwick Hoard	31 BC to 224	United Kingdom	1998	Museum of Somerset
Shrewsbury Hoard	4th century	United Kingdom	2009	British Museum
Silsden Hoard	1st century	United Kingdom	1998	Cliffe Castle Museum
St Albans Hoard	Late antiquity	United Kingdom	2012	Verulamium Museum
Staffordshire Hoard	7th century	United Kingdom	2009	Birmingham Museum and Art Gallery/Potteries Museum & Art Gallery
Stanchester Hoard	4th to 5th century	United Kingdom	2000	Wiltshire Museum
Stirling torcs	300 to 100 BC	United Kingdom	2009	National Museums Scotland
Thetford Hoard	4th century	United Kingdom	1979	British Museum
Towton torcs	Iron Age	United Kingdom	2010 to 2011	Yorkshire Museum
Trinity Hoard	Bronze Age	United Kingdom	2012	N/A
Vale of York Hoard	10th century	United Kingdom	2007	Yorkshire Museum
Walkington Hoard	40 to 20 AD	United Kingdom	1999 to 2008	Yorkshire Museum
Watlington Hoard	9th century	United Kingdom	2015	British Museum
West Bagborough Hoard	2nd century	United Kingdom	2001	Museum of Somerset
Wickham Market Hoard	Iron Age	United Kingdom	2008	Ipswich Museum
Winchester Hoard	Iron Age	United Kingdom	2000	British Museum
Wylye Hoard	Bronze Age	United Kingdom	2012	The Salisbury Museum

== Gallery ==
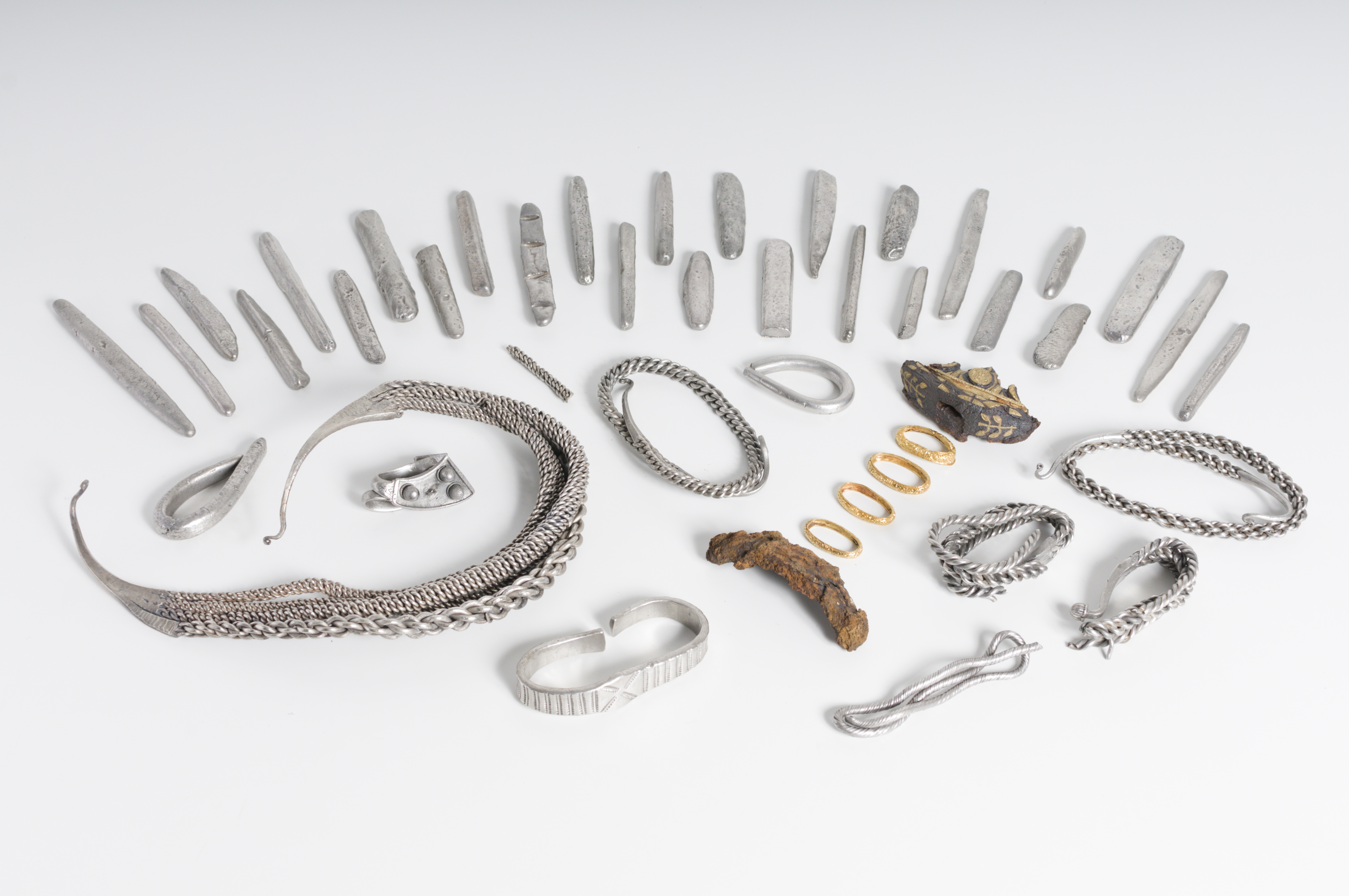
Bedale Hoard

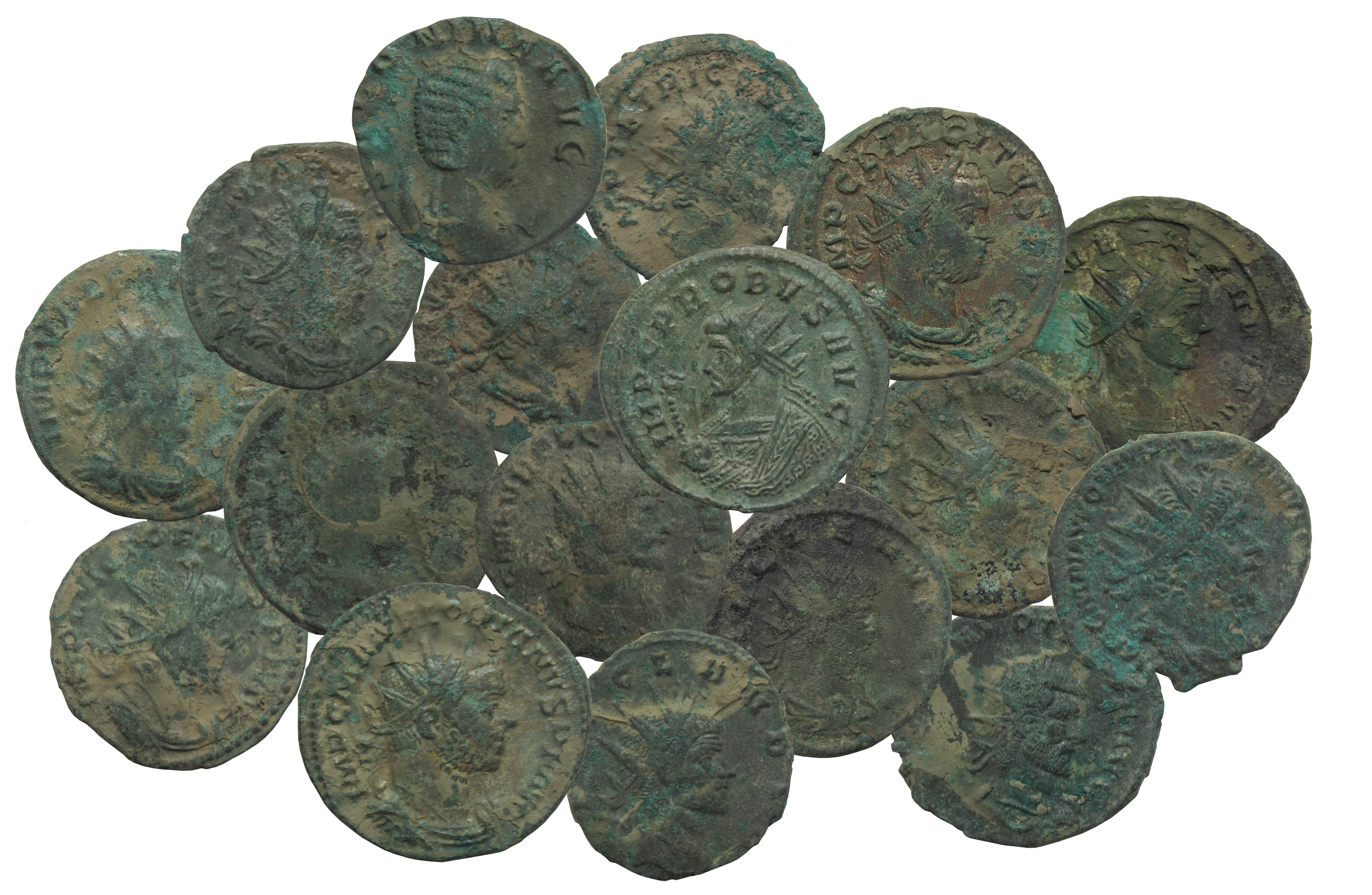
Bredon Hill Hoard

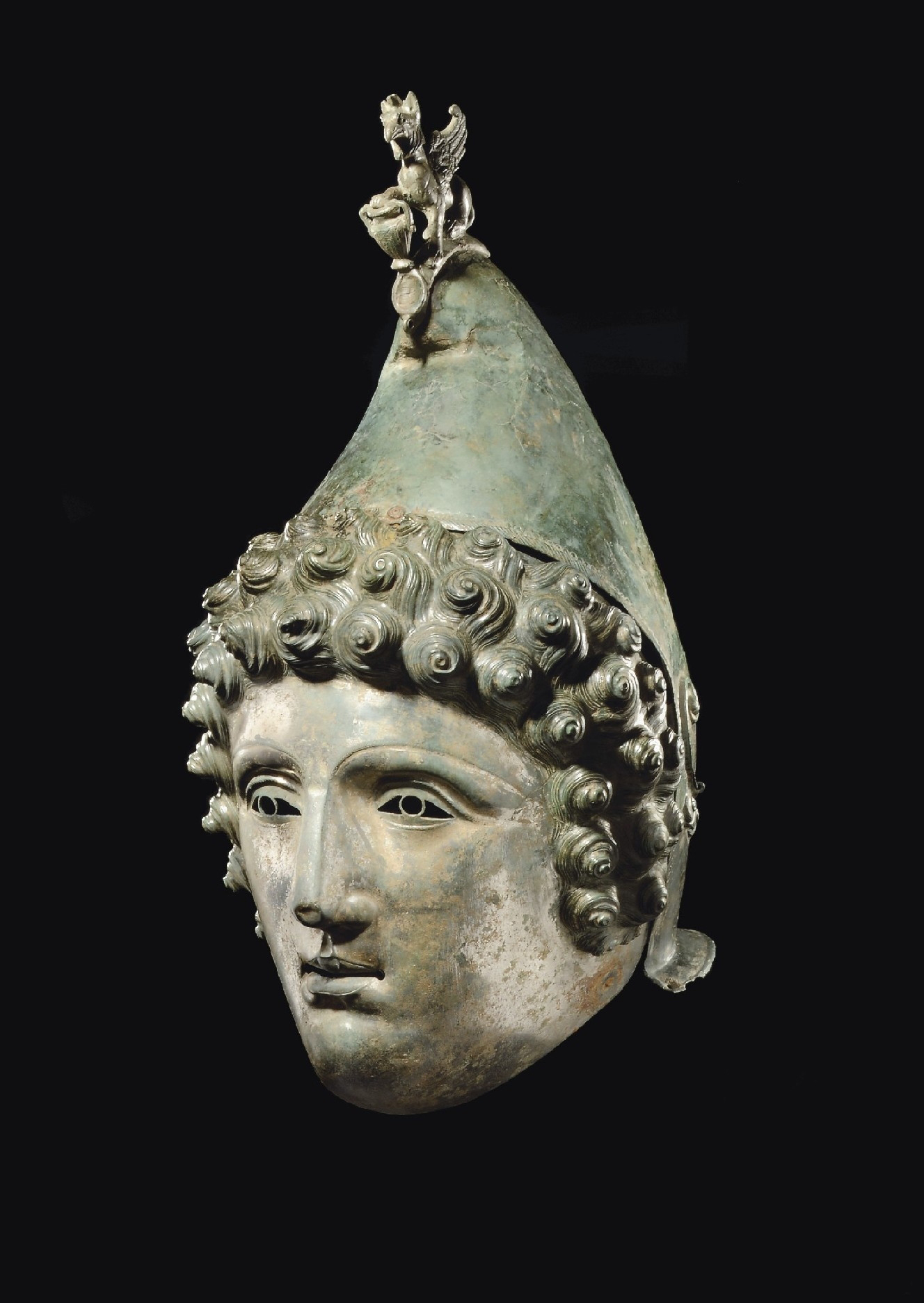
Crosby Garrett Helmet

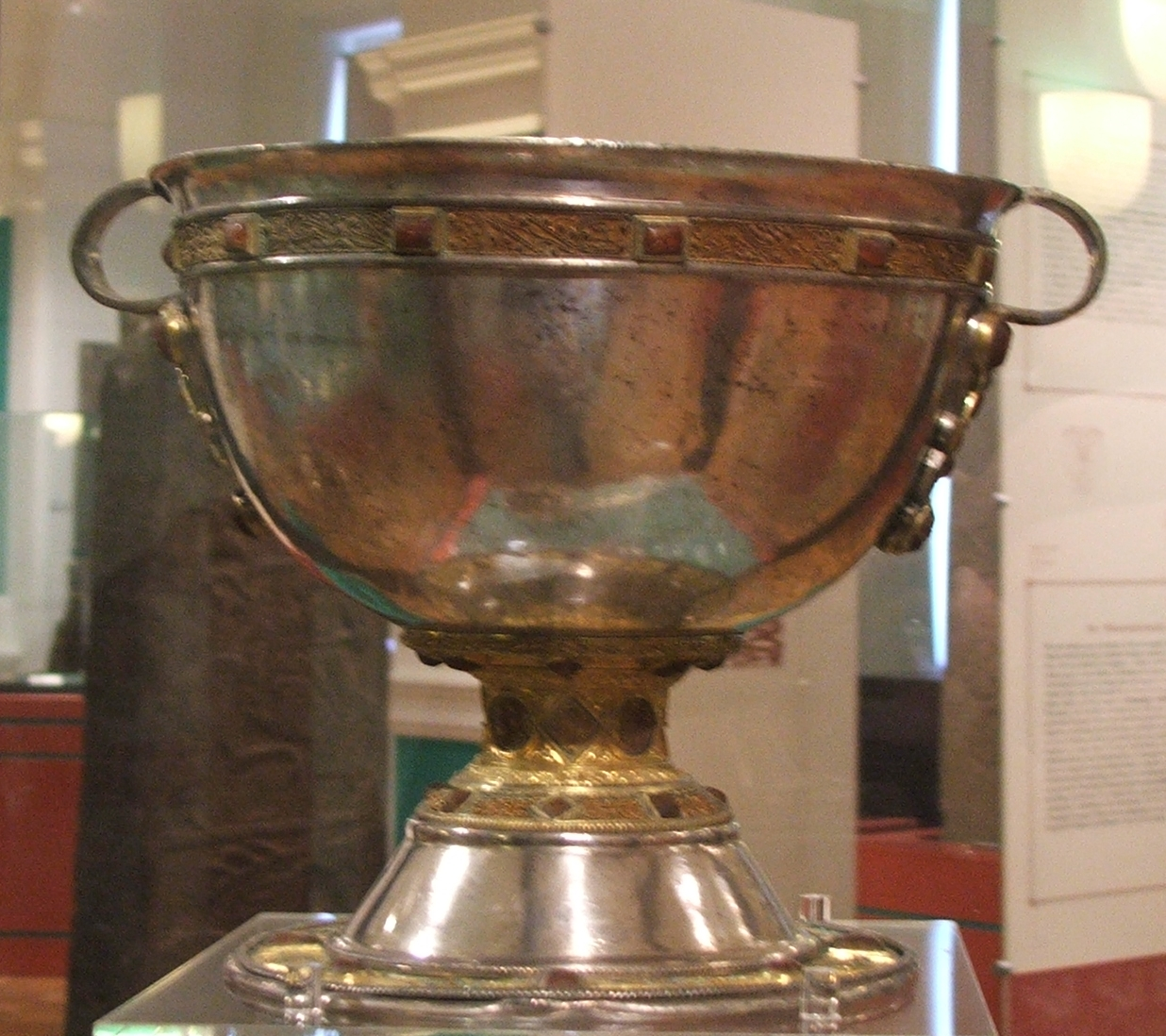
Derrynaflan Chalice

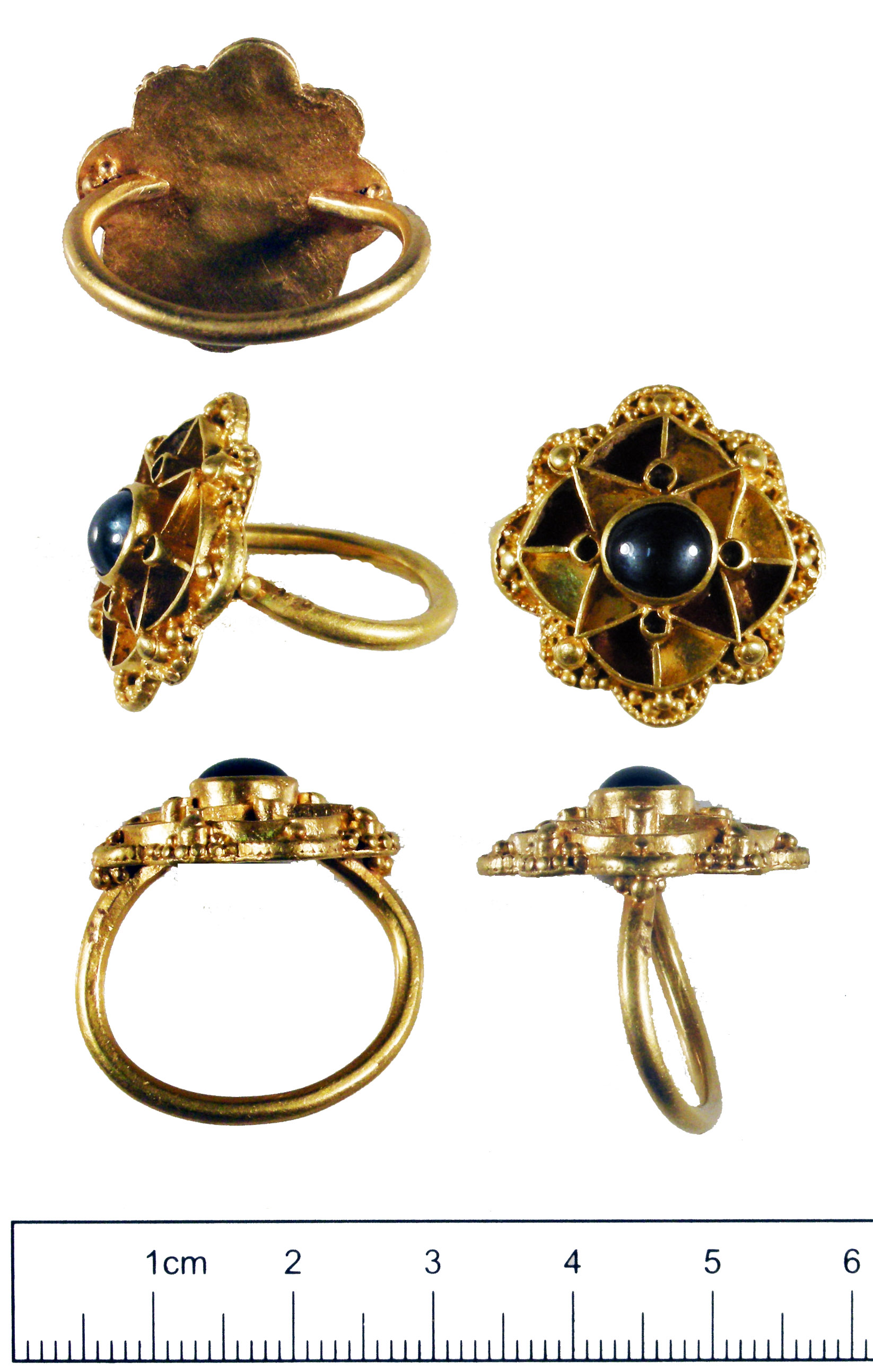
Escrick Ring
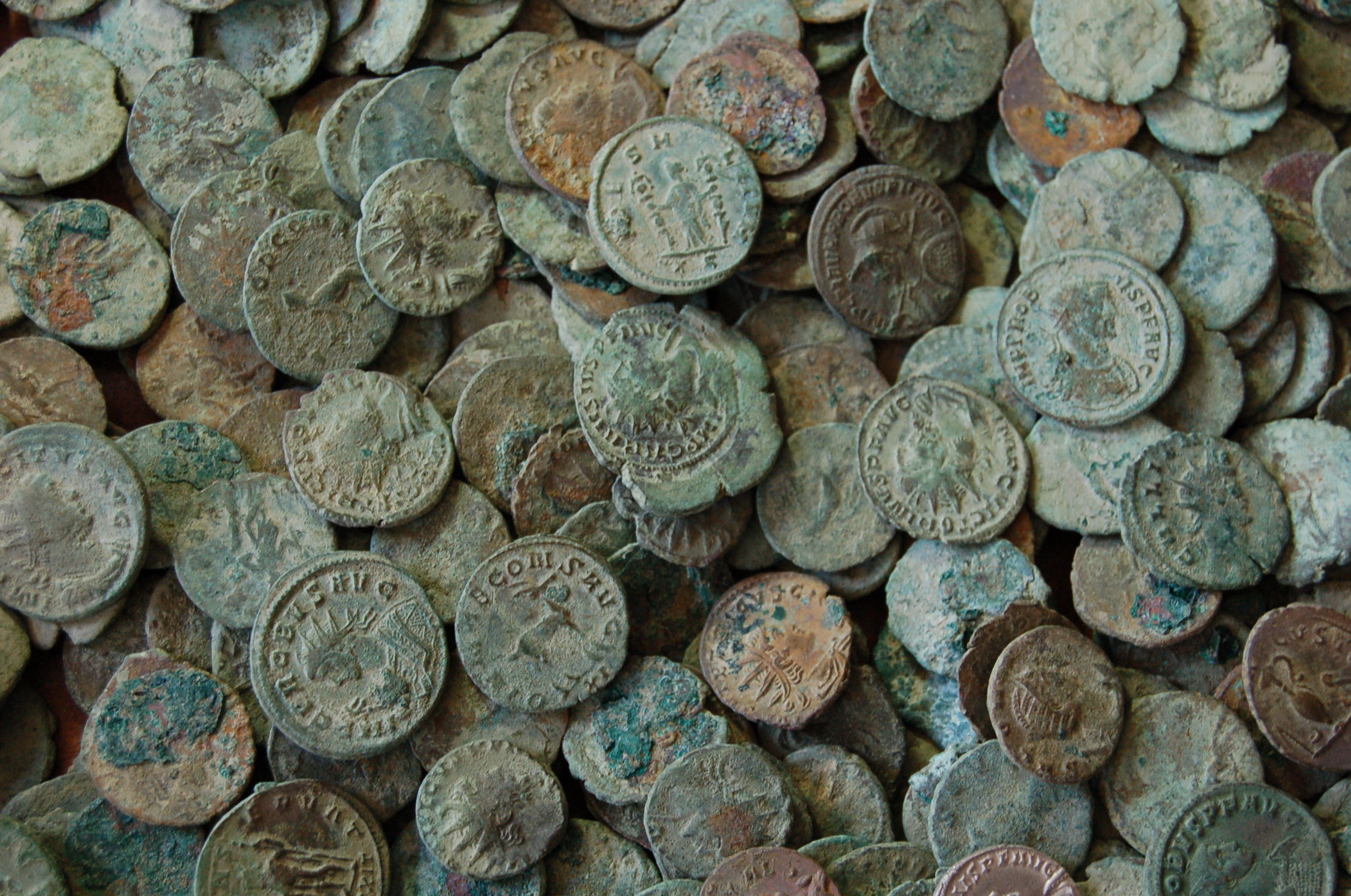
Frome Hoard

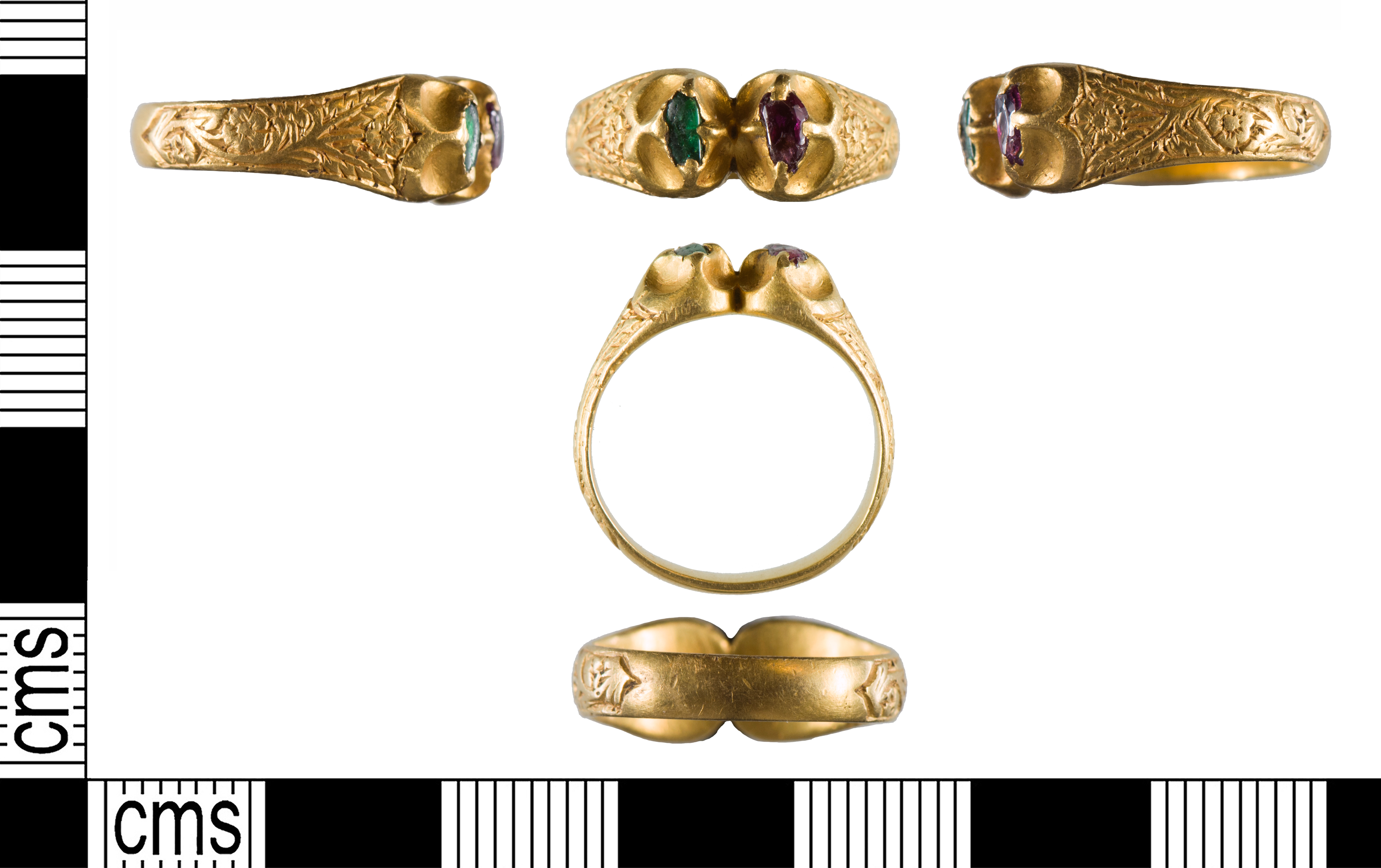
Fulford Ring

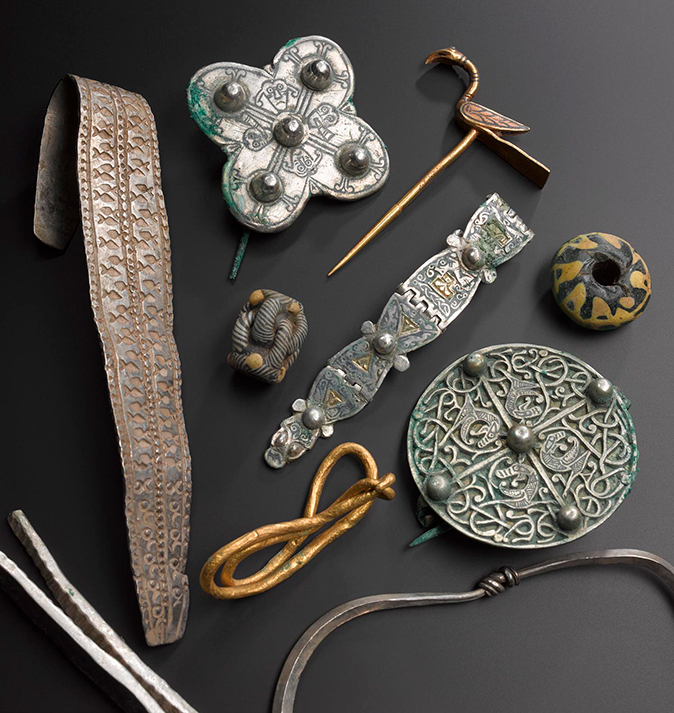
Galloway Hoard

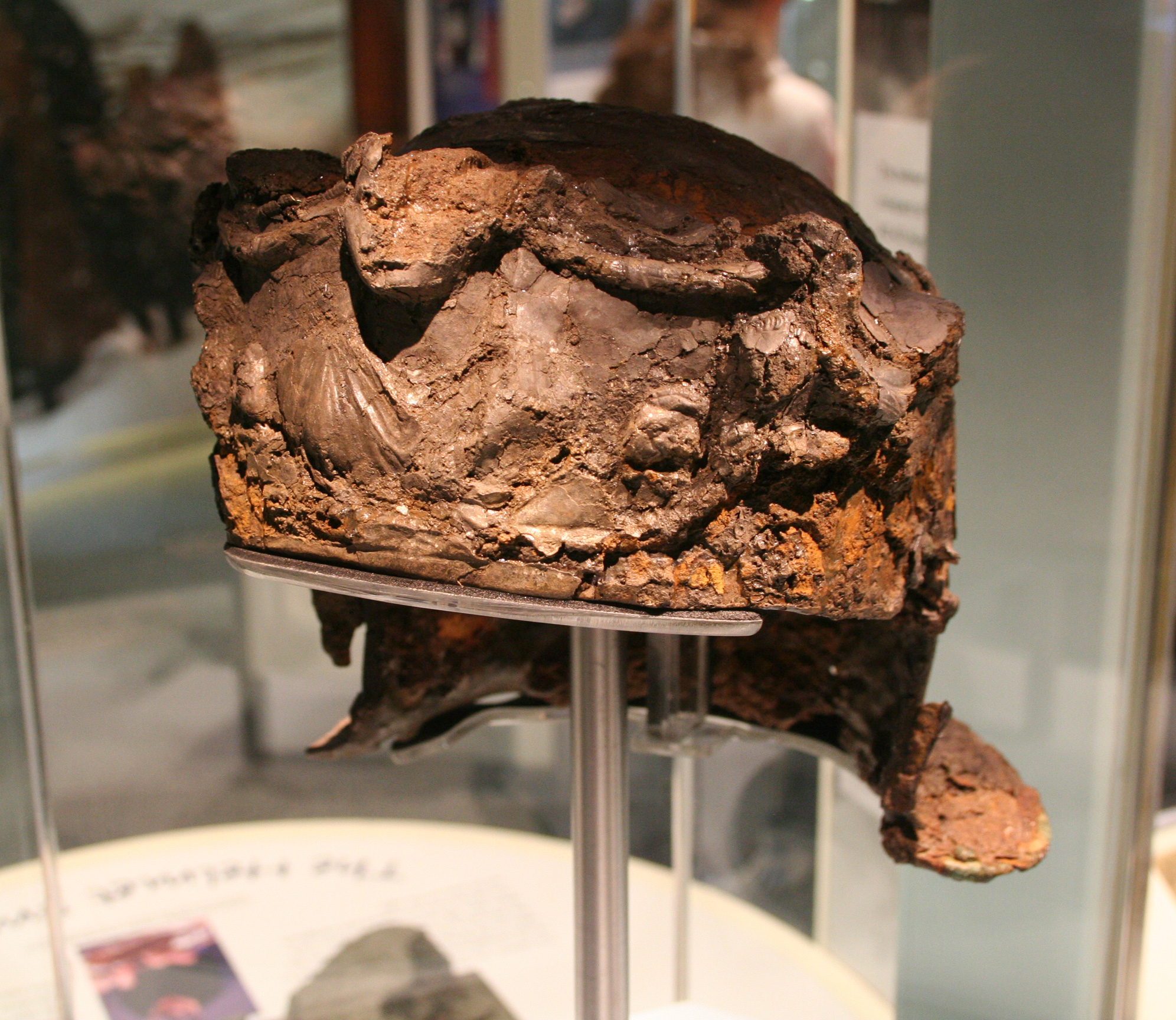
Hallaton Helmet

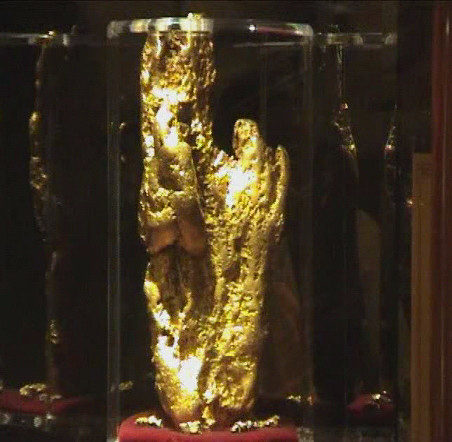
Hand of Faith
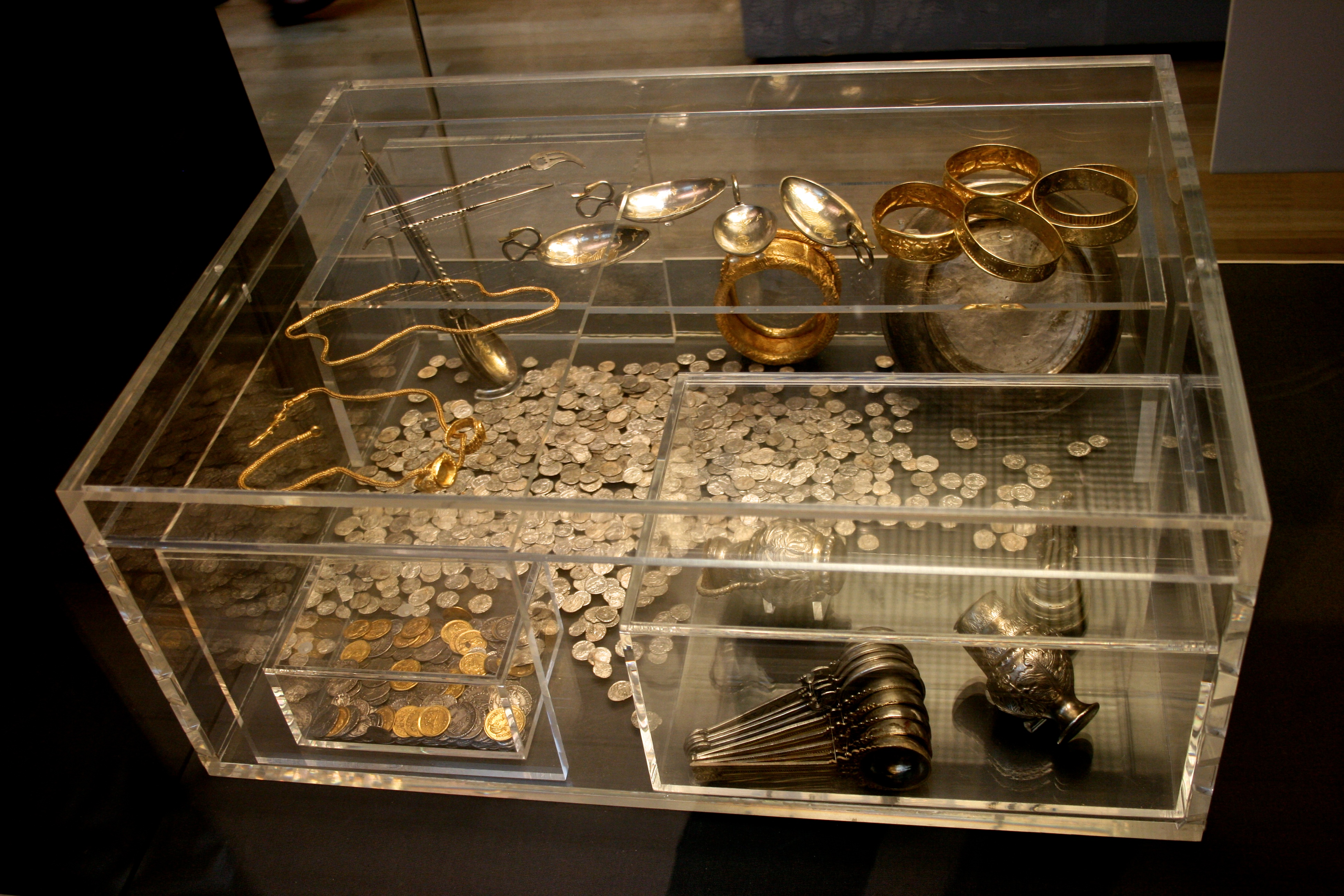
Hoxne Hoard

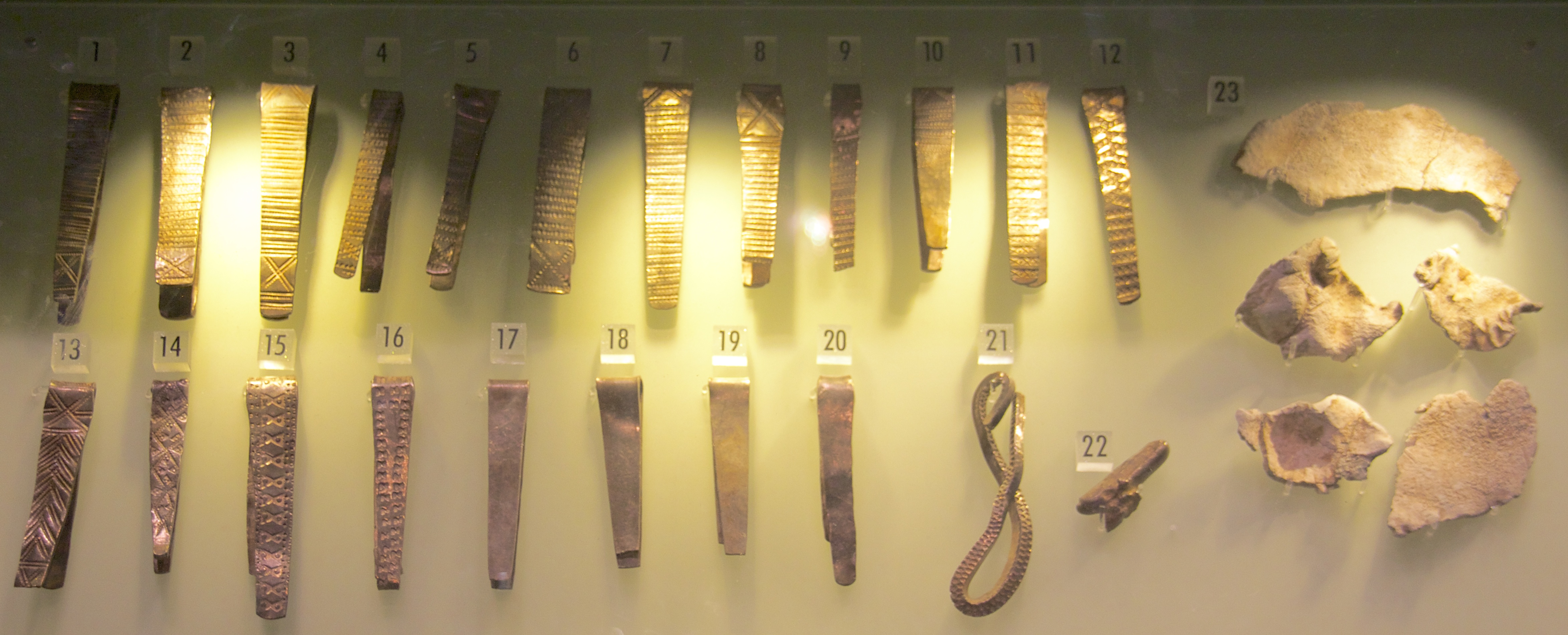
Huxley Hoard

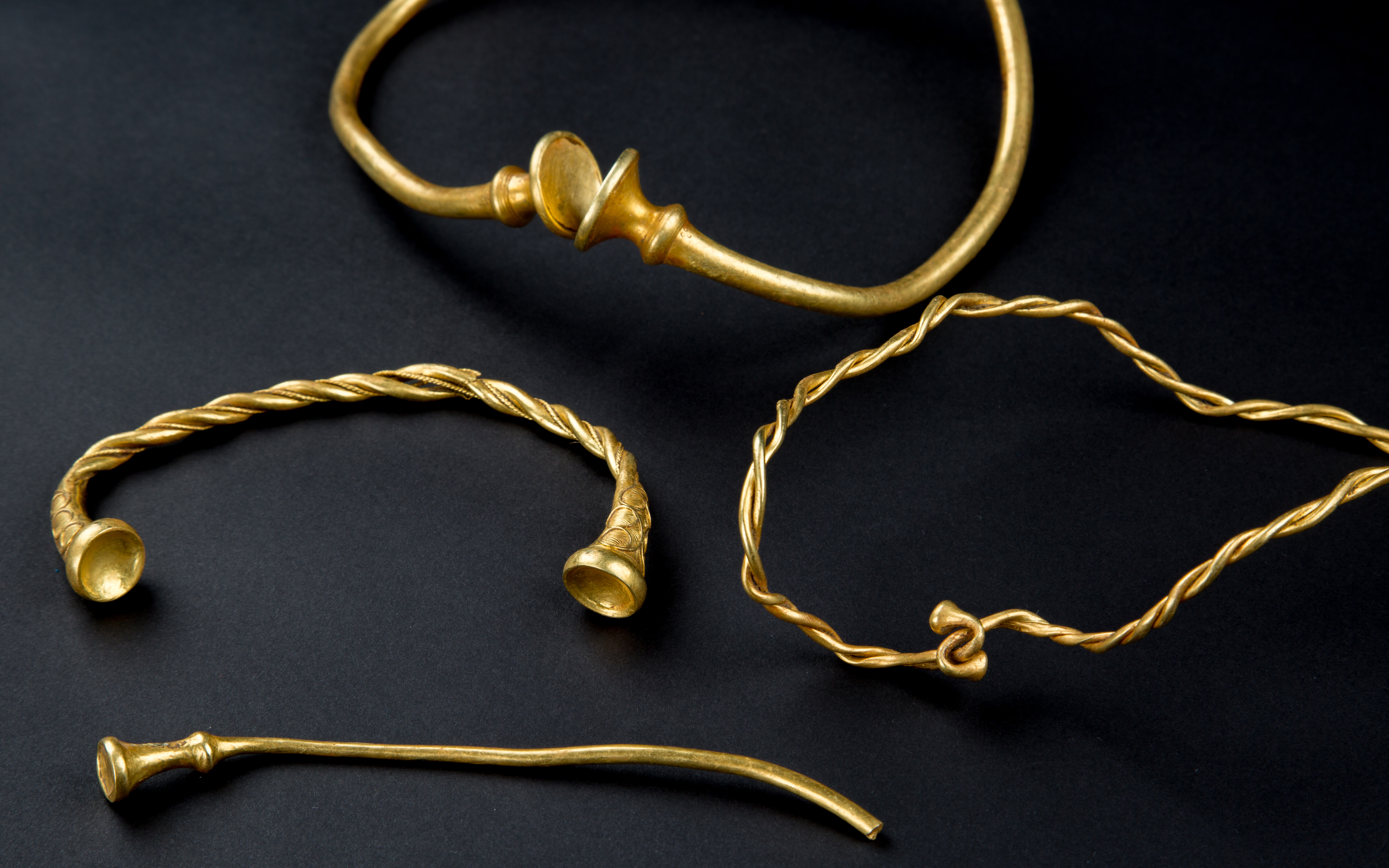
Leekfrith Torcs
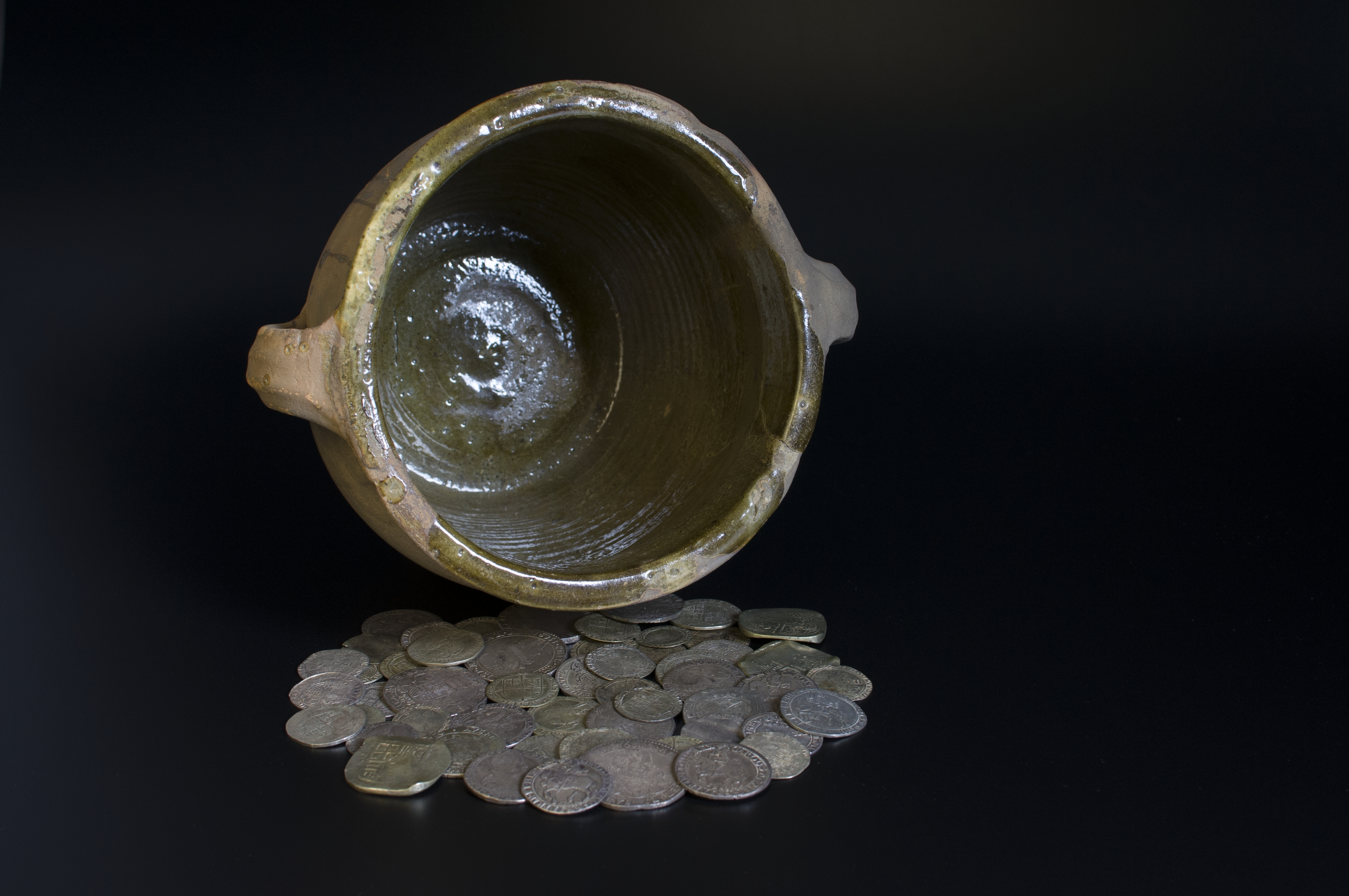
Middleham Hoard

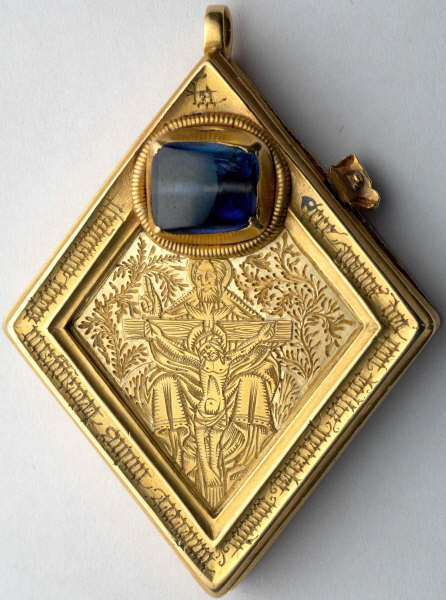
Middleham Jewel

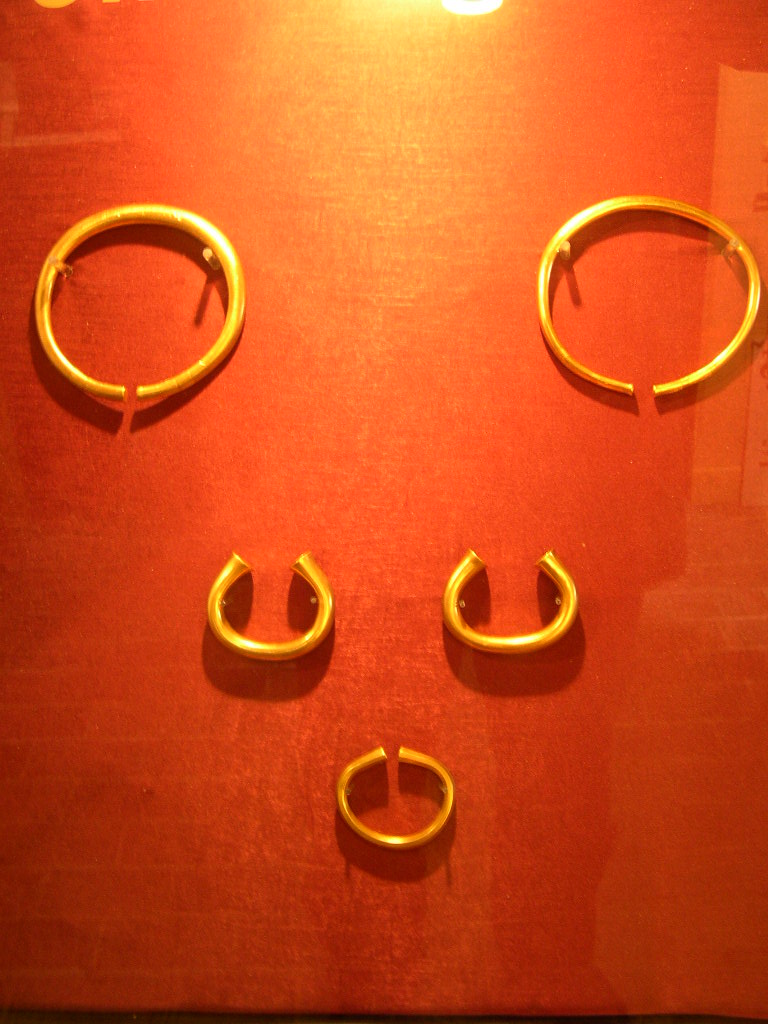
Milton Keynes Hoard

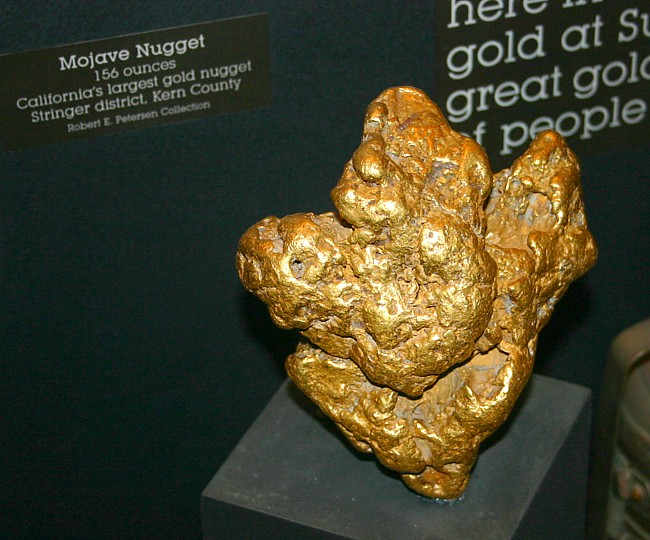
Mojave Nugget

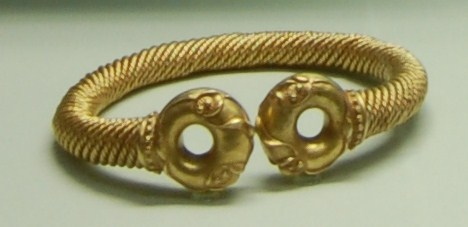
Newark Torc
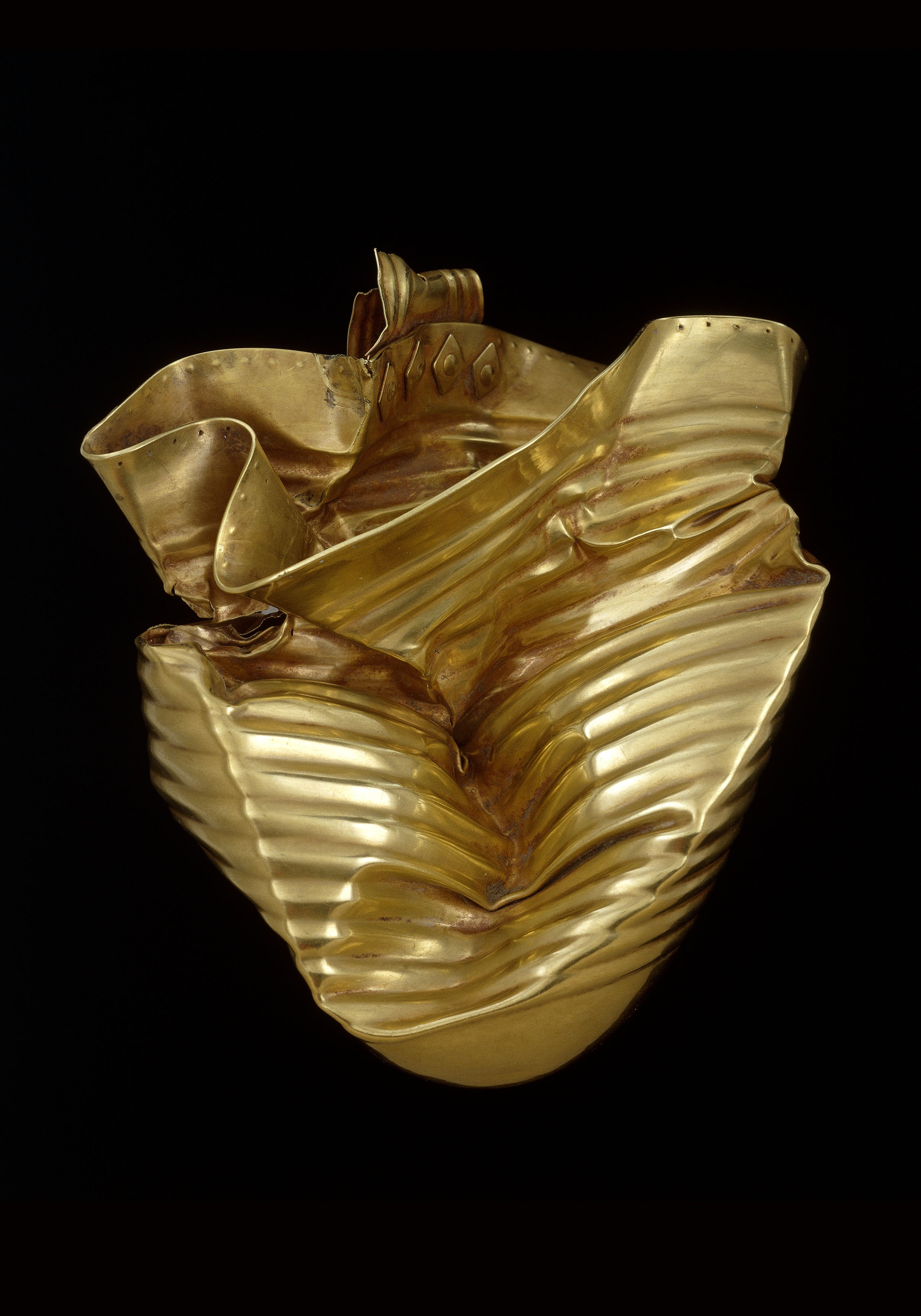
Ringlemere Cup

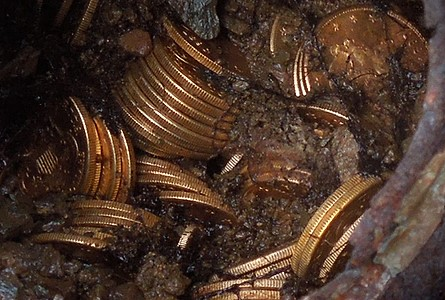
Saddle Ridge Hoard

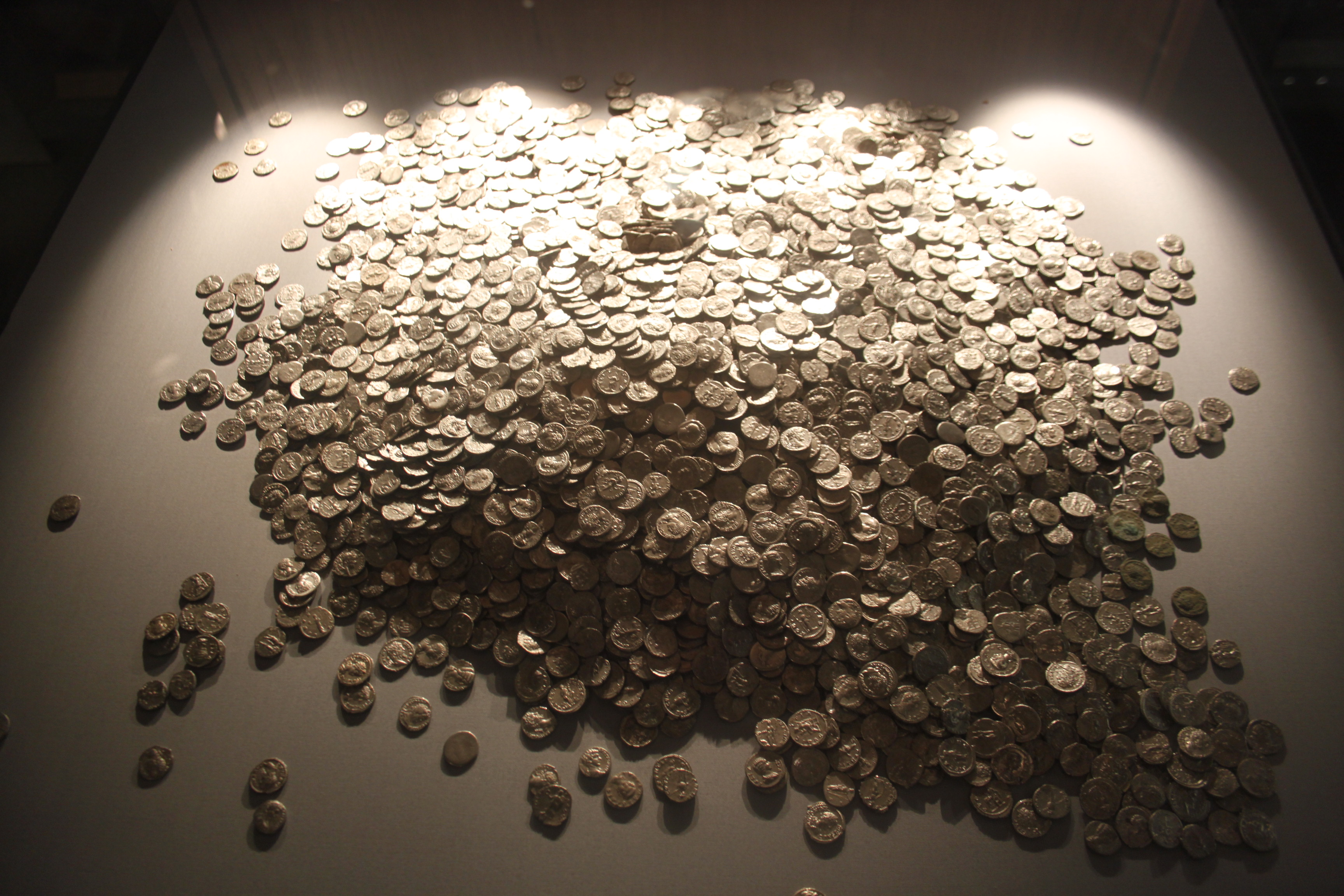
Shapwick Hoard

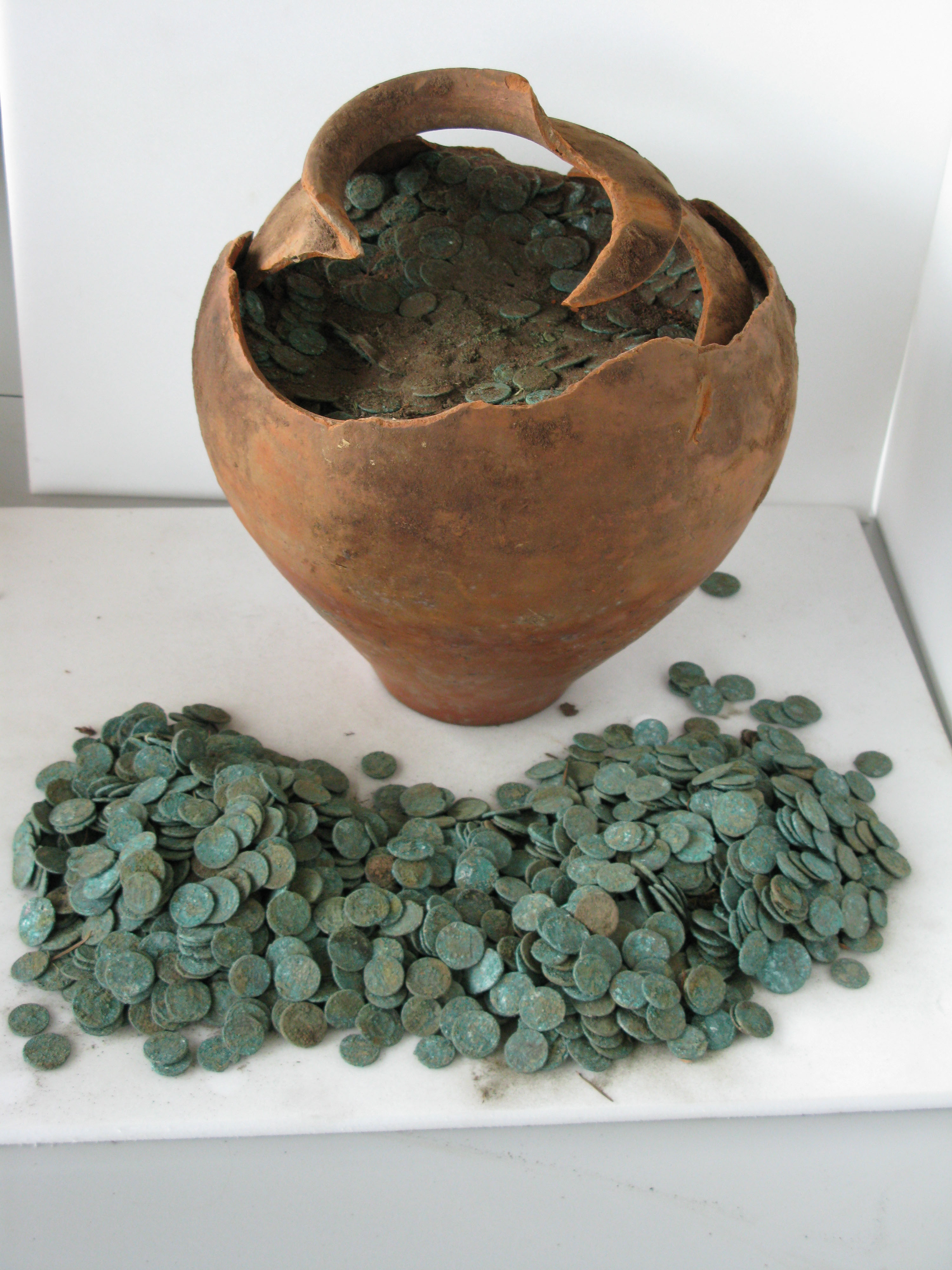
Shrewsbury Hoard

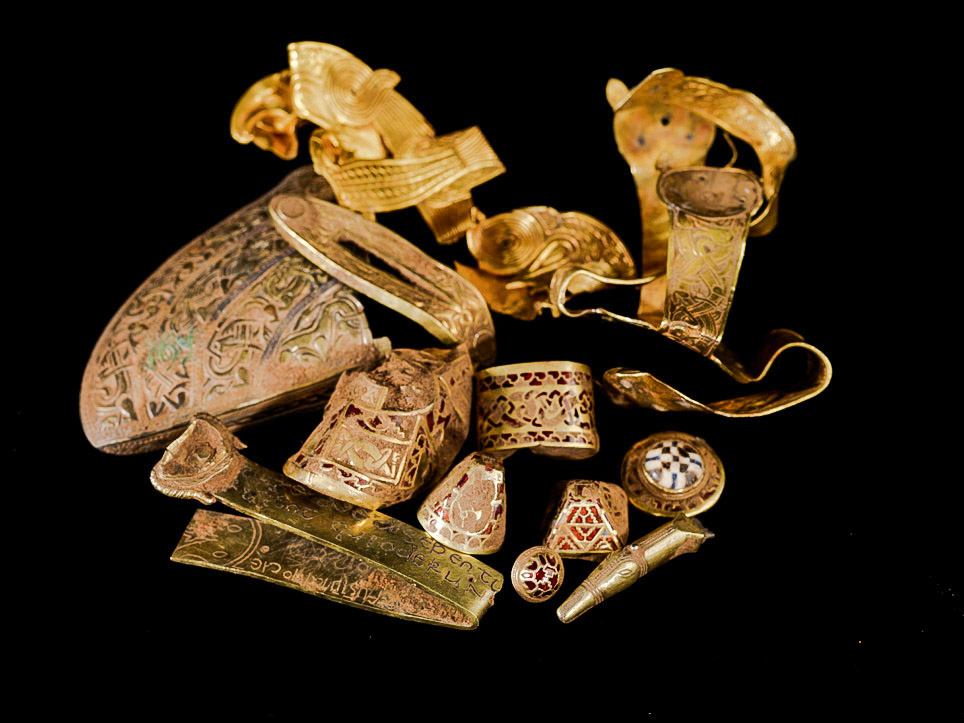
Staffordshire Hoard
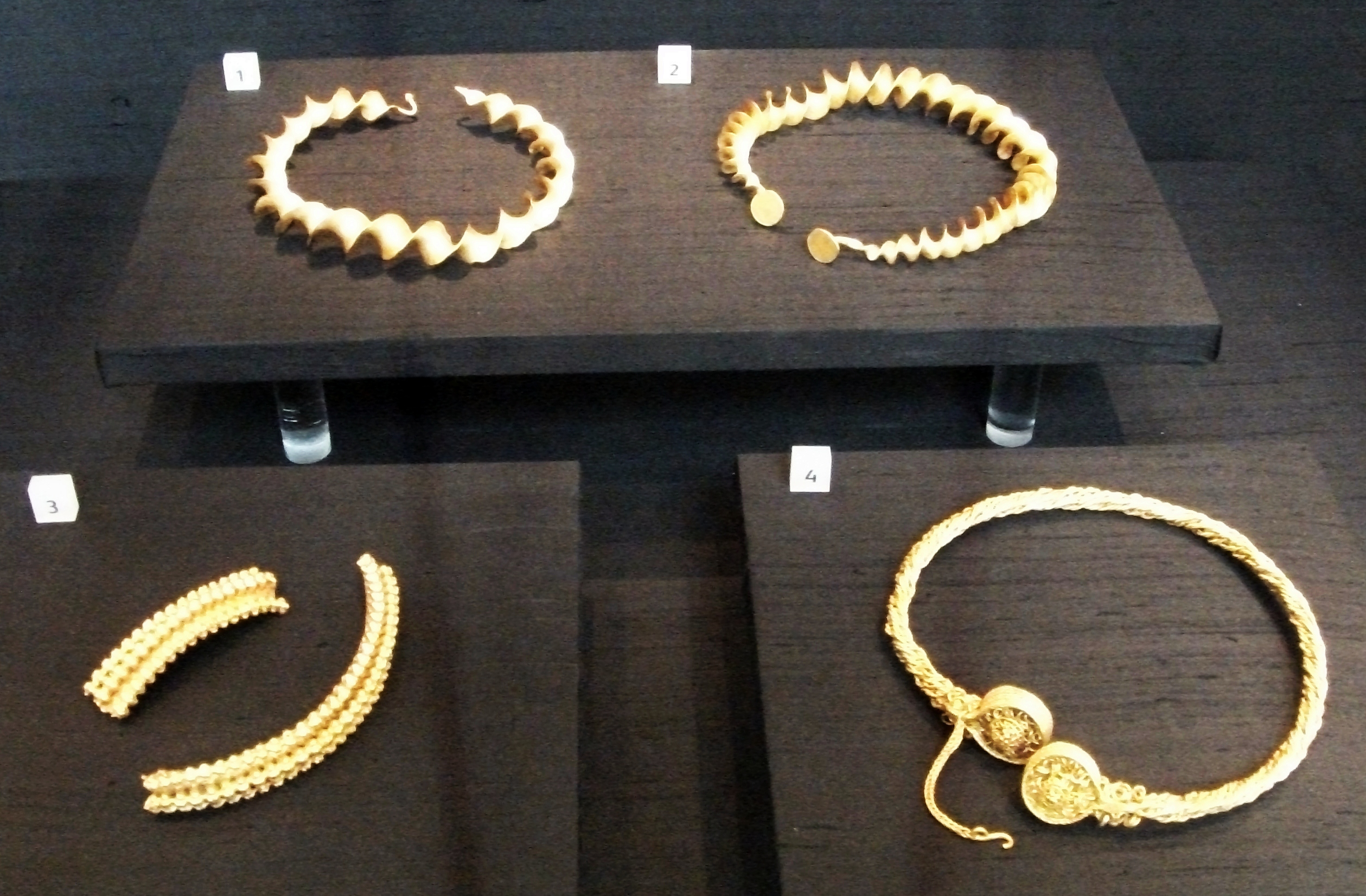
Stirling Torcs

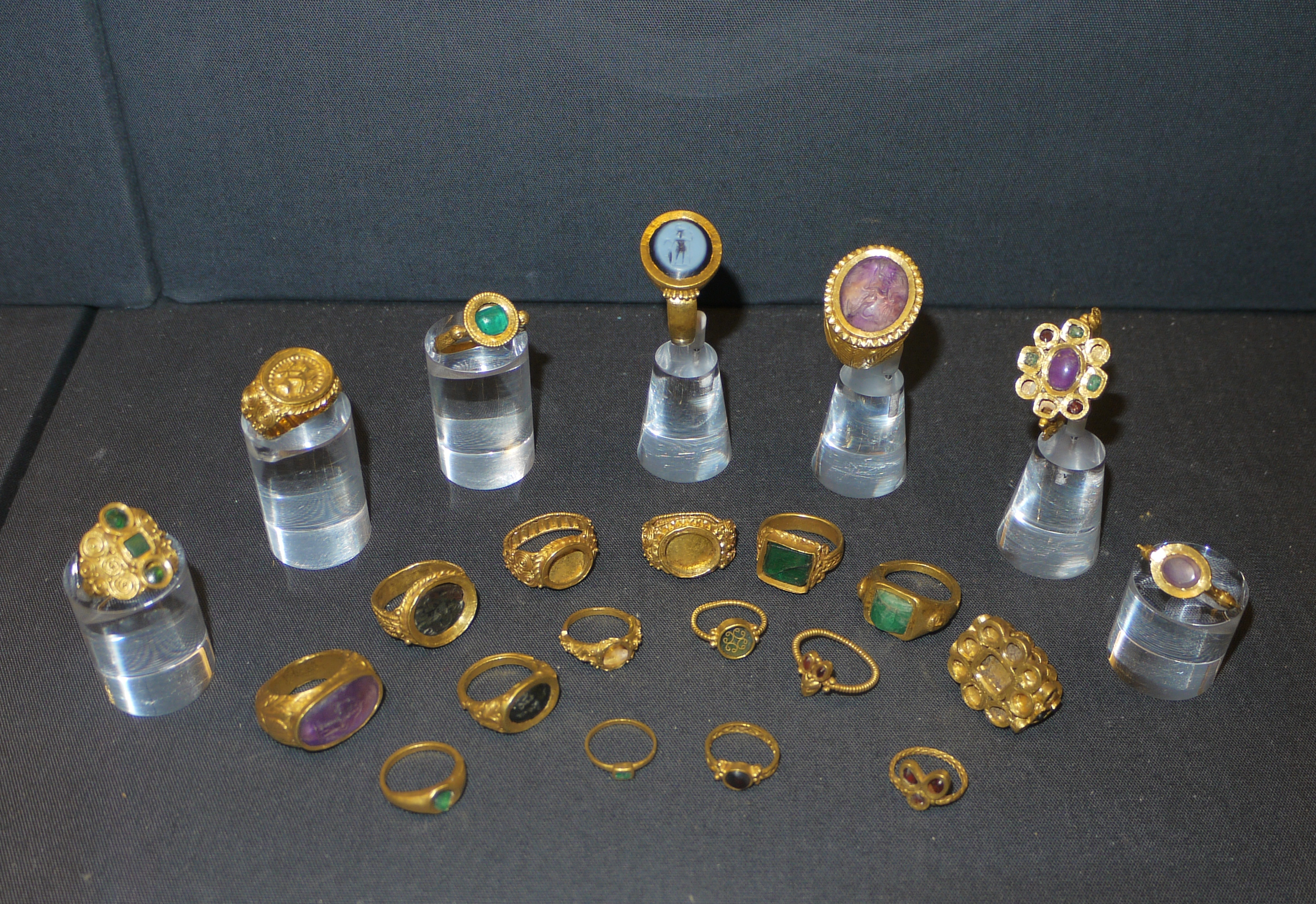
Thetford Hoard

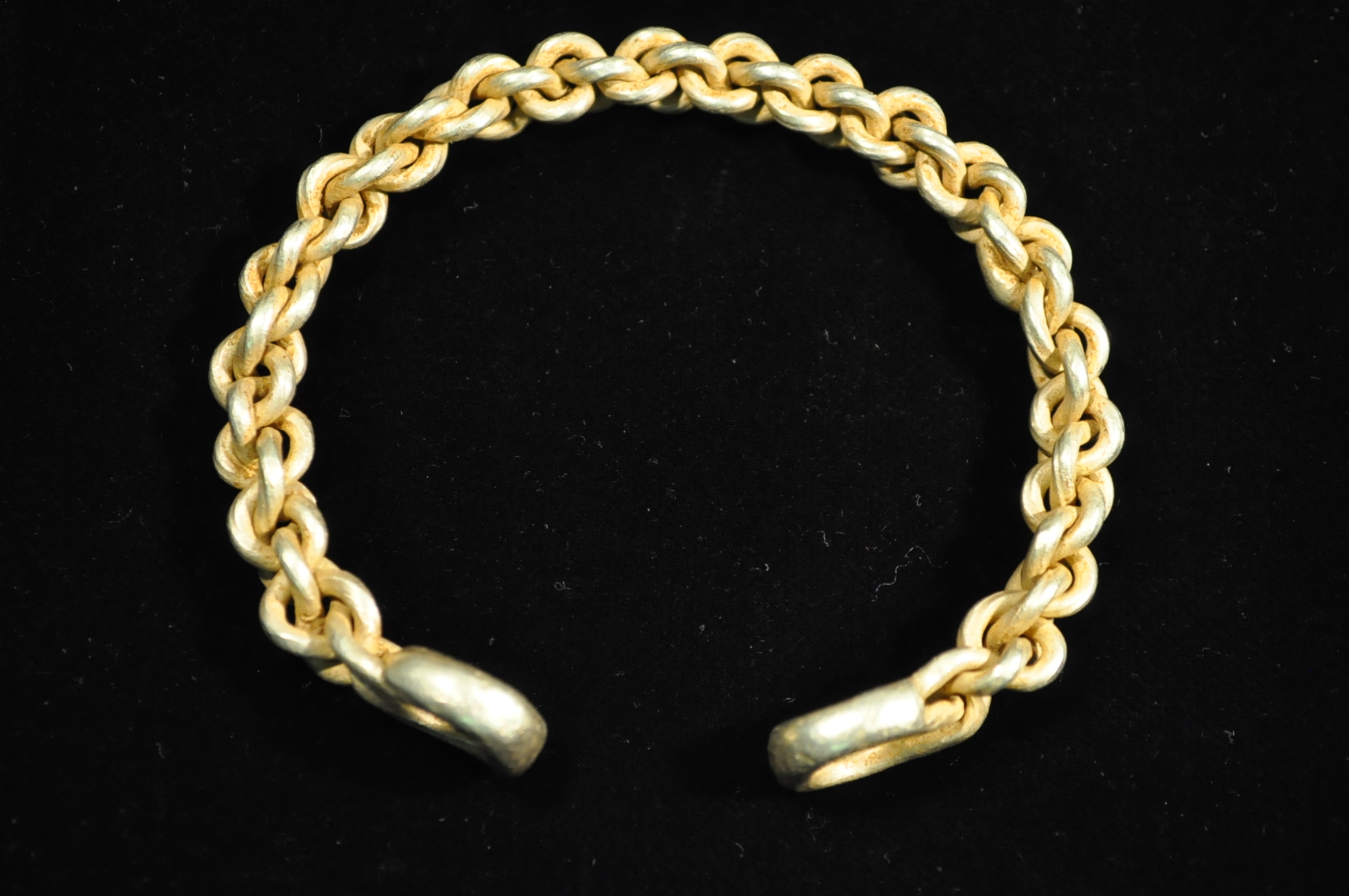
Towton Torcs

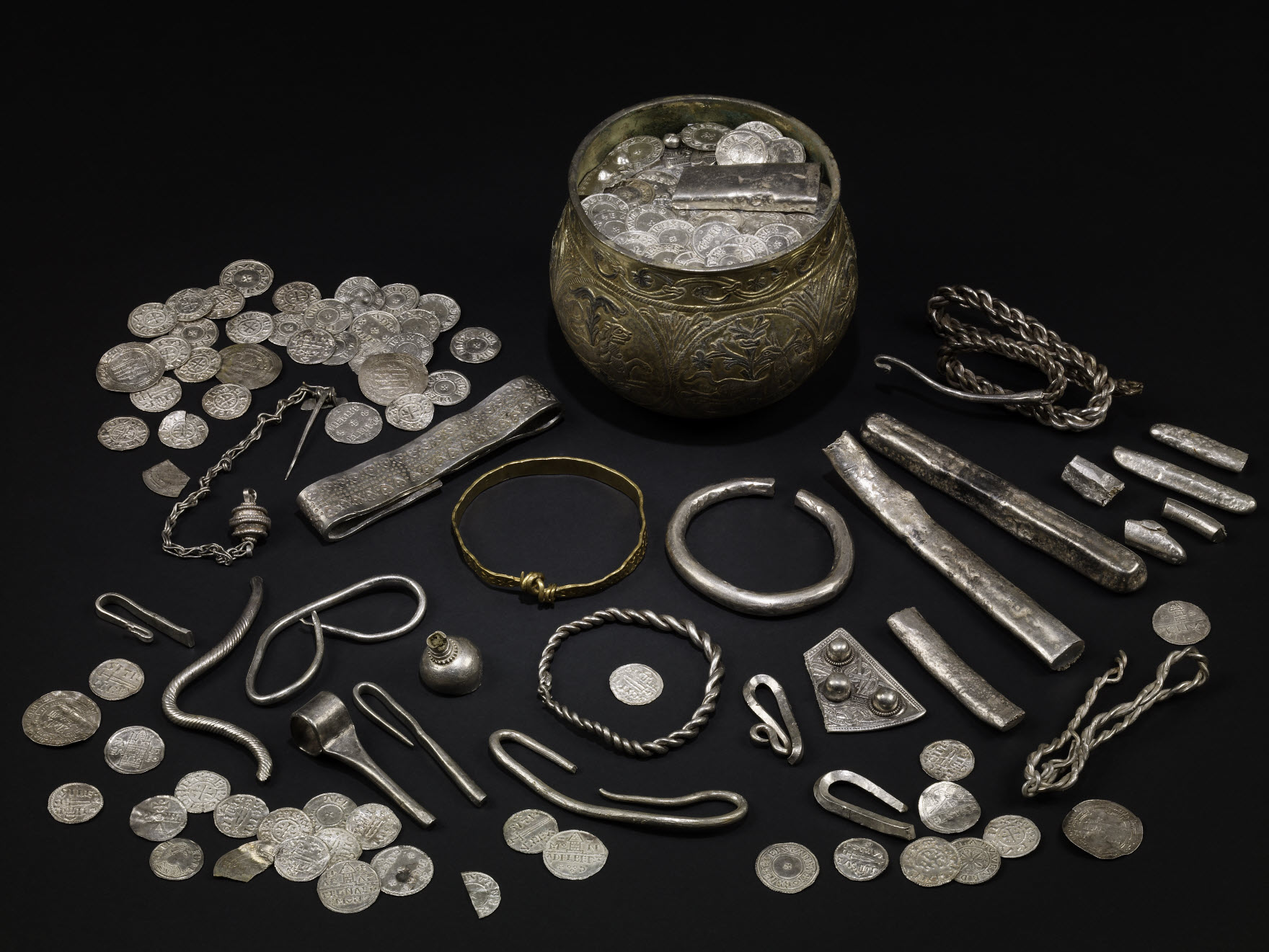
Vale of York Hoard
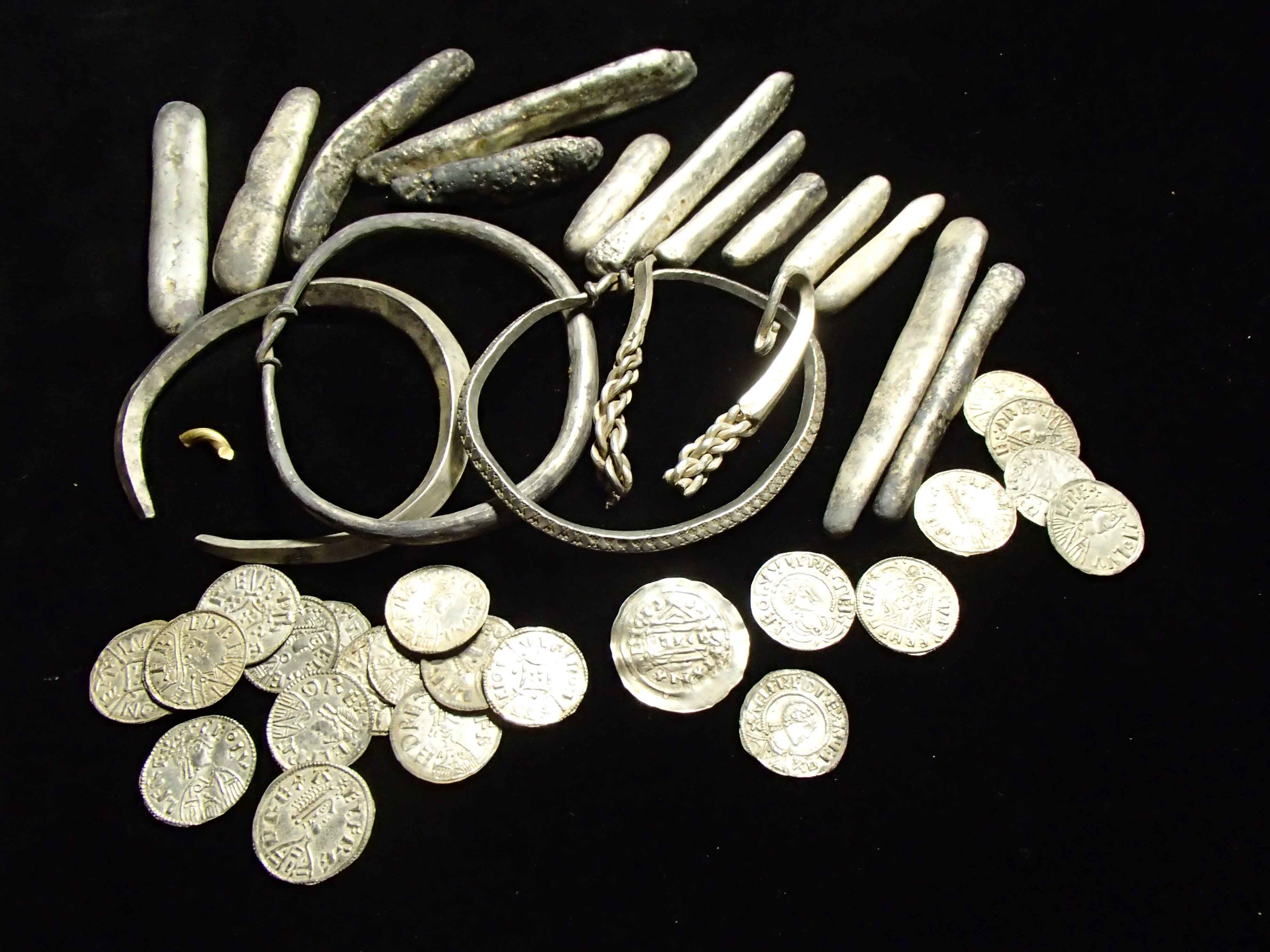
Watlington Hoard

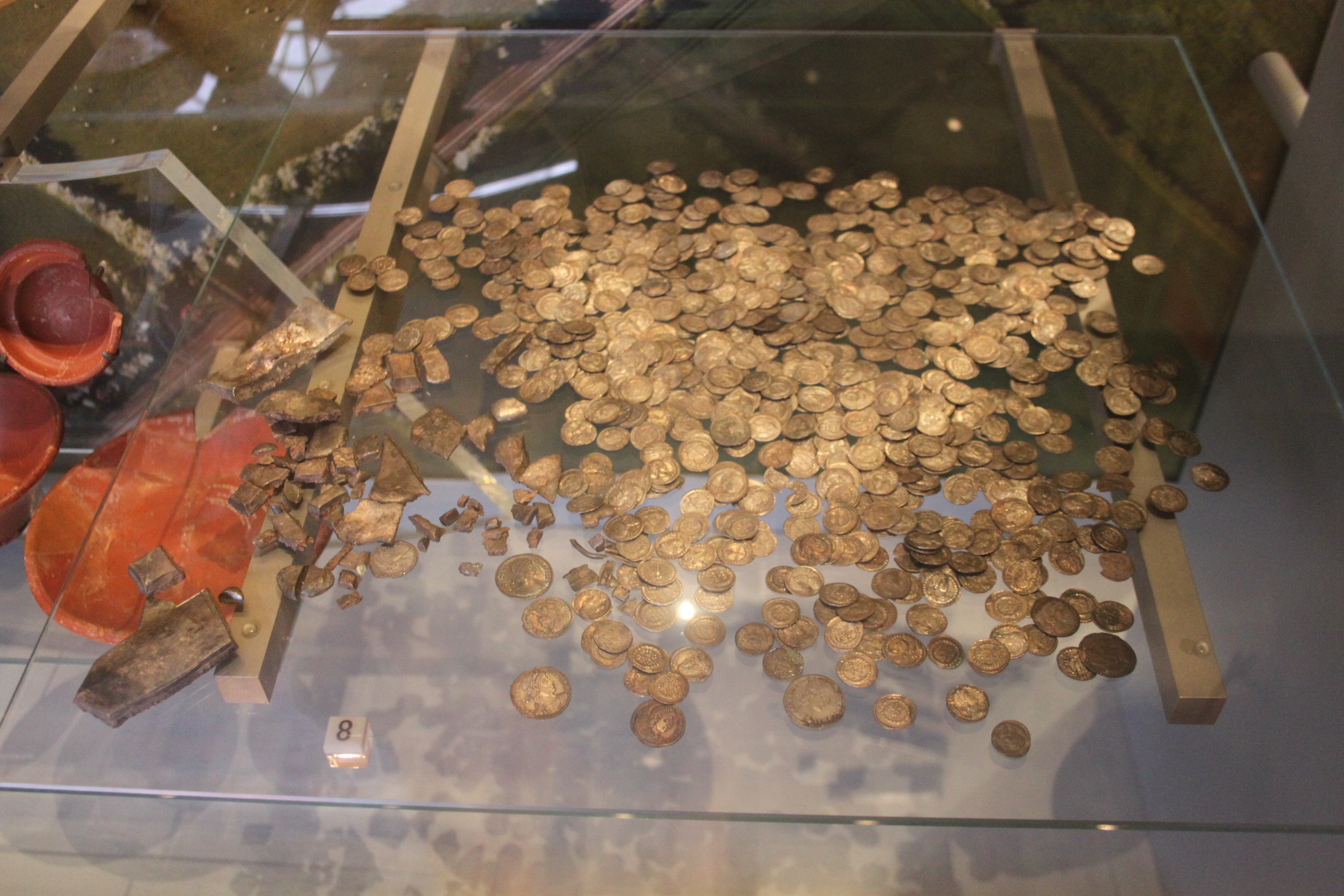
West Bagborough Hoard

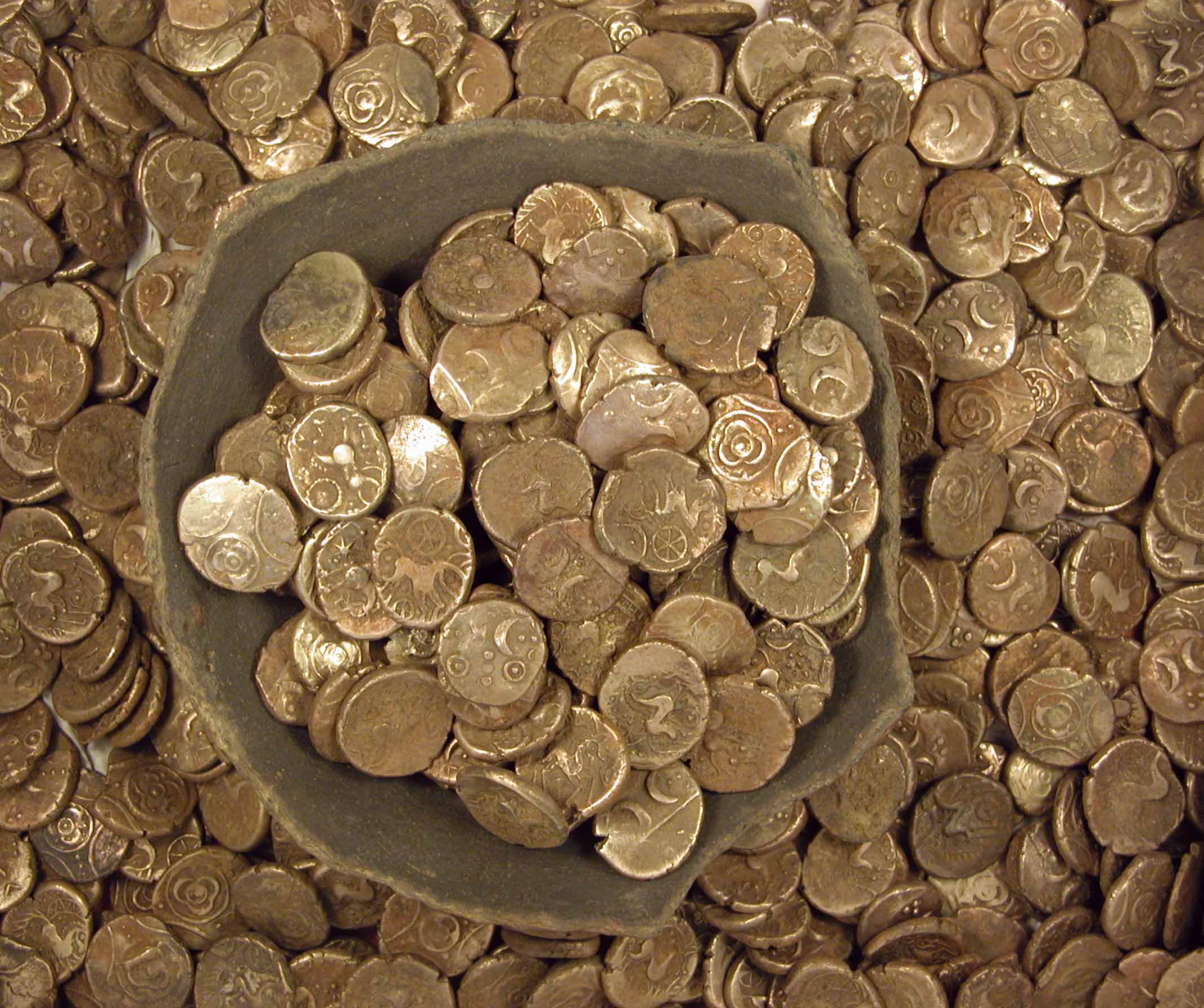
Wickham Market Hoard

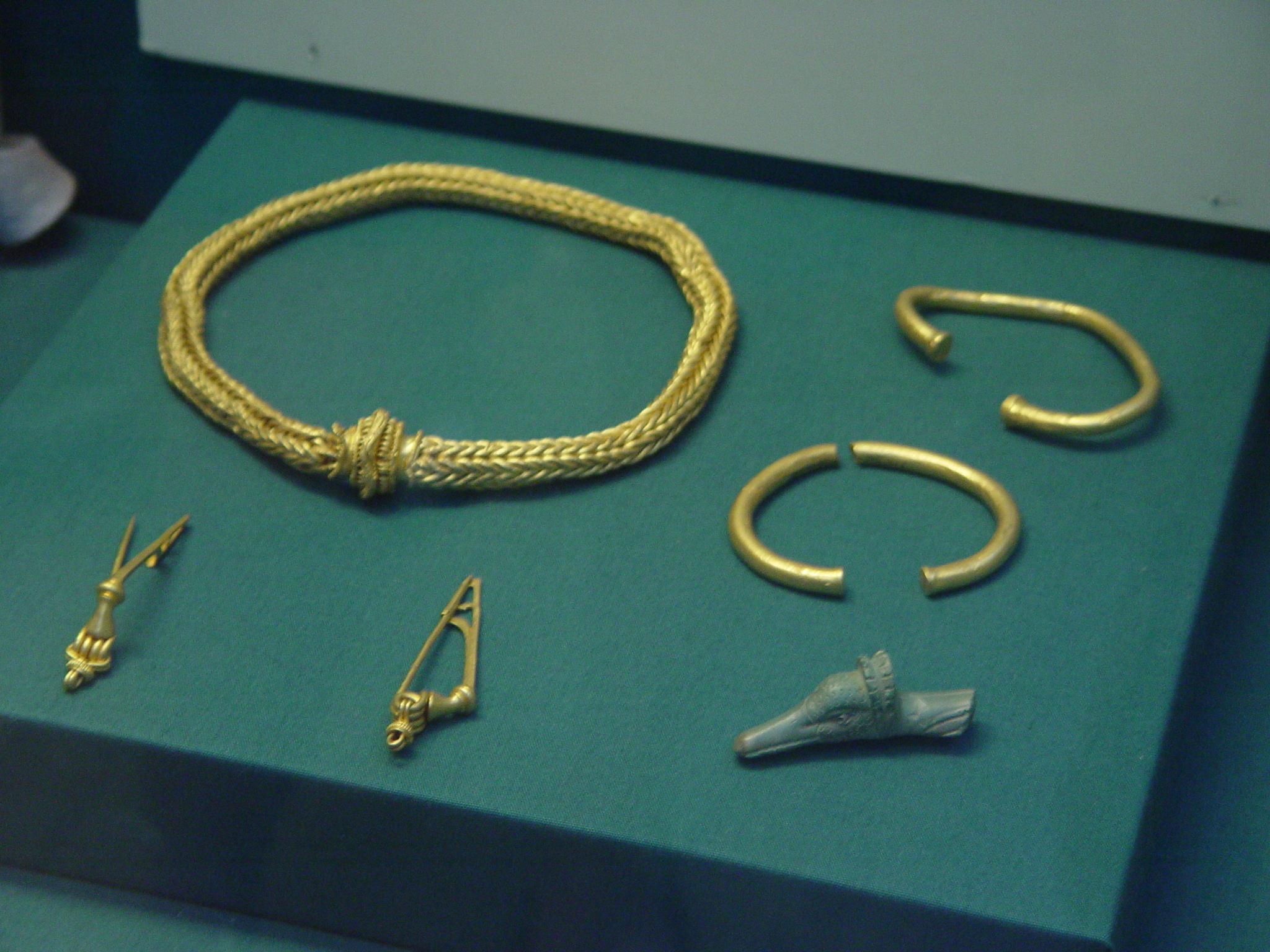
Winchester Hoard

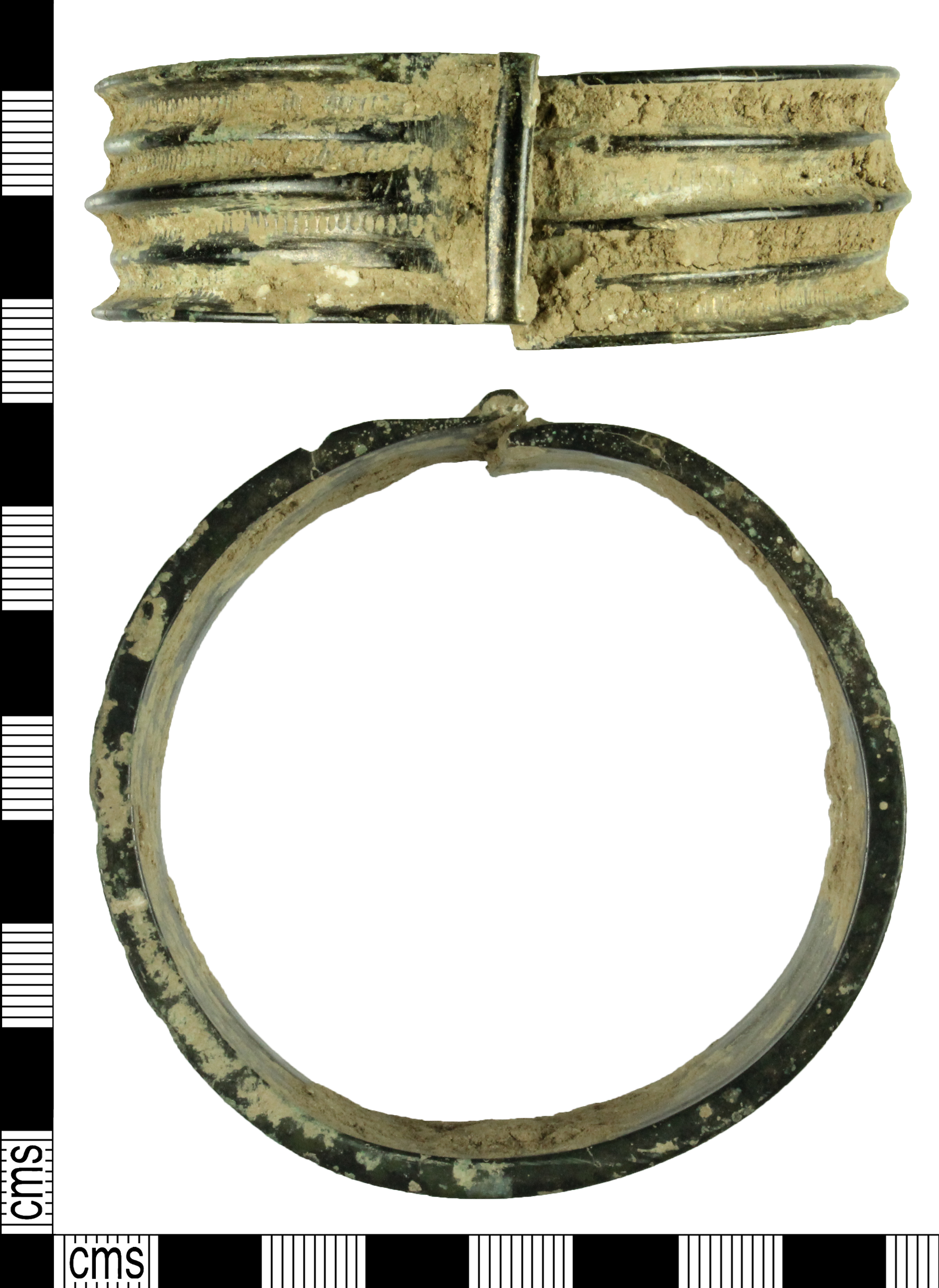
Wylye Hoard

== See also ==
- Treasure hunting
