= Trinity Hoard =

Bronze Age hoard discovered in Trinity Parish, Jersey

Coordinates: 49.23°N 2.09°W

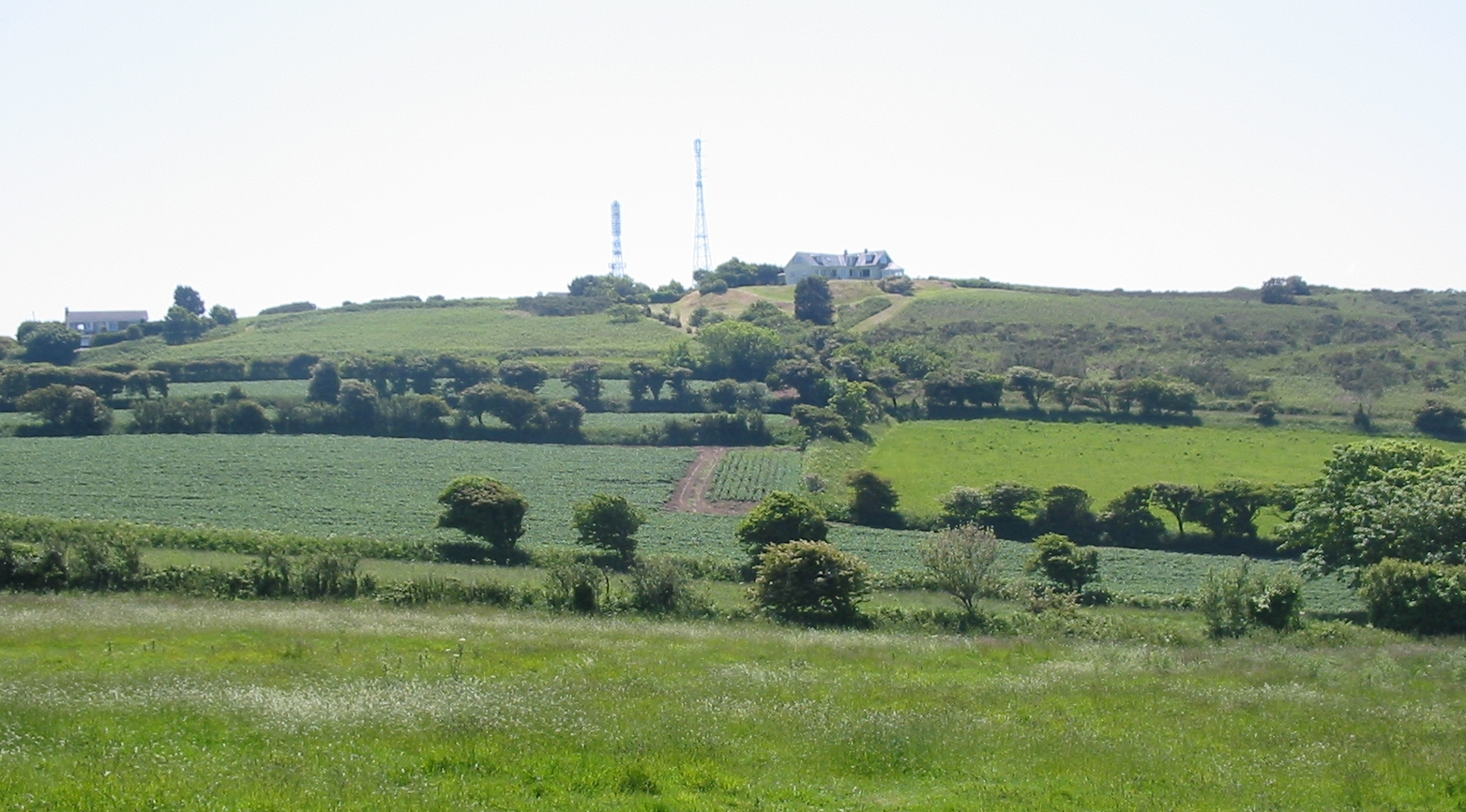
General view of Trinity in 2009

Trinity Hoard is a collection of Bronze Age items, including 23 bronze axeheads, found in Jersey in 2012.

== Find and study ==
The hoard of late Bronze Age (around 1,000 BCE) items was found inside a pottery container, about 30 cm underground, in October 2012, by metal detectorist Ken Rive, in the Parish of Trinity in the north of Jersey. A conservator from Jersey Heritage was able to attend at the find before digging began. The container was around 30 cm across. It had been damaged, probably by a plough, which had freed the two axeheads. There was other material at the site, including pieces of broken pottery not from the primary find.

Initially, only two socketed axeheads were identified, but after scanning by an X-ray scanner at Jersey Airport, a further 21 axeheads, at least, were seen to be present in the pot. The first two axeheads were subjected to an X-ray fluorescence scan at Cranfield University, which showed that the bronze alloy has a very high lead content (nearly 55%). Such a high lead content level would have made the axes too soft for practical use, suggesting that they were prestige objects that were accumulated as a sign of wealth. The pottery container was opened by conservators, and a total of 25 axeheads were recovered, in the care of Jersey Heritage, and treated with advice from the British Museum. A display from the hoard was established in the Jersey Museum in December 2012.

The find came months after another significant find in Jersey, the Grouville Hoard, which included about 70,000 pieces of Celtic coin, and gold and silver jewellery.

== See also ==
- List of hoards in the Channel Islands
