= Grouville Hoard =

Iron Age and Roman coins, Jersey

Coordinates: 49.19°N 2.05°W

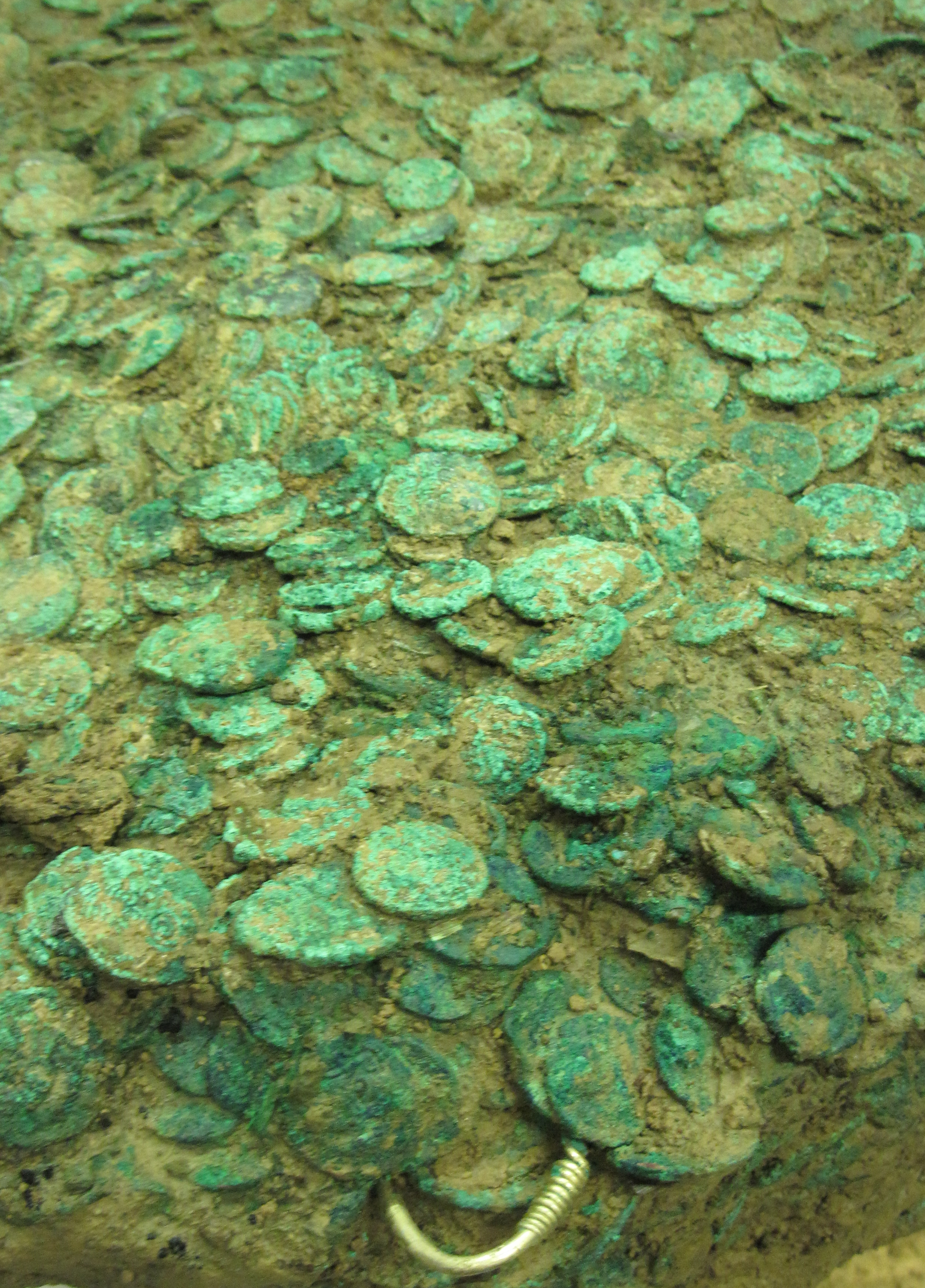
The excavated hoard undergoing cleaning and investigation. Jewellery can be seen protruding from the mass of coins.

The Grouville Hoard (Le Câtillon II) is a hoard of an estimated 70,000 late Iron Age (Celtic) and Roman coins reported in June 2012. They were discovered by metal detectorists Reg Mead and Richard Miles in a field at an undisclosed location in the parish of Grouville on the east side of Jersey in the Channel Islands. It is the largest hoard ever found in Jersey, and the first major archaeological find made by metal detectorists in the island.

The hoard is thought to have belonged to a Curiosolitae tribe fleeing Julius Caesar's armies around 50 to 60 BC.

The find was the subject of a BBC Radio 4 programme in November 2021.

== Discovery ==
Mead and Miles started metal detecting in the area where the hoard was reported in the early 1980s after they heard about a farmer who some years earlier had discovered a number of silver coins in an earthenware pot while pulling out a tree from a hedgerow. However, as they did not know the exact location of the find, and as the current owner of the farm would only allow them to metal detect once a year for 10–15 hours after the crops had been harvested, it took about 30 years before they eventually managed to locate the hoard.

In early 2012, Mead and Miles initially found 60 silver and one gold Celtic coins, possibly minted by the Curiosolitae tribe at Saint-Malo in France. Subsequent detecting by Mead and Miles in the area of the initial find led them to discover a huge mass of Iron Age and Roman coins embedded in clay. The pair notified Jersey Heritage of the find, and in June 2012, archaeologists from the Société Jersiaise and Jersey Heritage, together with Celtic coin expert Philip de Jersey, worked to remove the clay mass of coins, measuring 140×80×20 cm (55×31×8 in) and weighing about 750 kg (1,650 lb), which has since been taken to the Jersey Archive for cleaning and conservation.

== Context ==
Excavation of the pit containing the large hoard has revealed evidence of timber posts, possibly from a hut, and large quantities of burnt daub and late Iron Age and early Roman pottery. The presence of slag and furnace linings along with some coins which have been cut in half, could suggest that the coins were being melted down. It may be that new coins were being minted here. A geophysical survey of the area found anomalies which according to Dr Hervé Duval-Gatignol, Société Jersiaise’s archaeologist, "could represent part of a rectilinear enclosure consistent with known forms of rural settlements of late Iron Age date in Armorica."

== Conservation and display ==
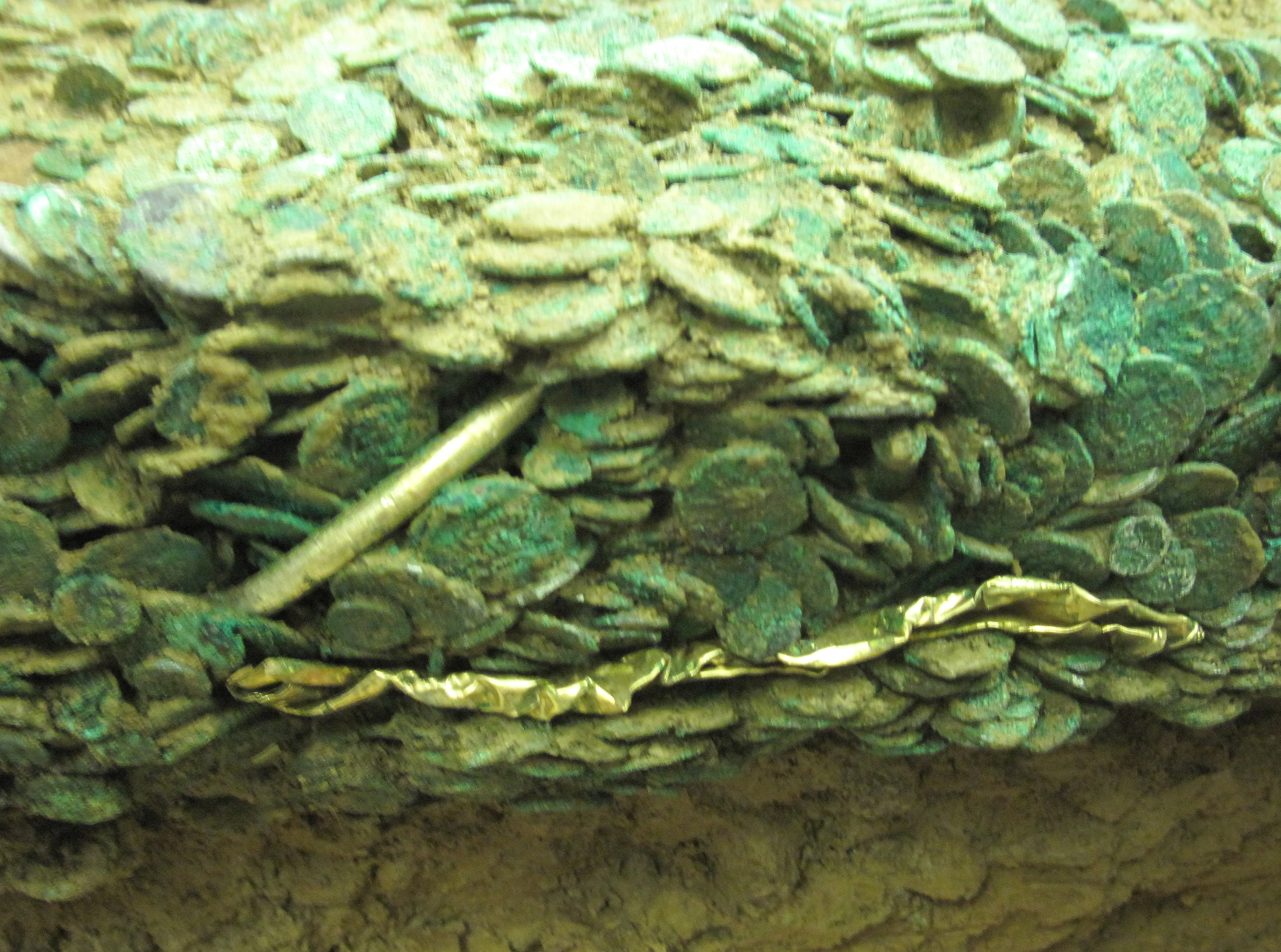
Two gold torcs have been identified at the edge of the mass of coins.

Conservation and examination of the hoard is ongoing, and the individual items have so far been removed from the clay mass in which they were embedded. In addition to an estimated 70,000 Celtic and Roman silver coins, the hoard contains gold torcs, silver bracelets, gold sheet, fine silver wire, and a number of glass beads.

The hoard formed part of an exhibition at the Jersey Museum which ran from 26 May to 31 December 2014. As of 2015, the hoard is on display at La Hougue Bie Museum.

== Valuation ==
The legal situation regarding the coins is unclear as the law of treasure trove may no longer be applicable in Jersey, and Jersey does not have a legal framework for dealing with treasure finds such as the Treasure Act 1996 in the United Kingdom. The discovery has been reported to the Receiver General of Jersey.

The two finders and the landowner made an agreement to share the proceeds of the hoard, and have indicated that they hope the coins will eventually be put on display at the Jersey Museum or Jersey Archive.

Philip de Jersey, an expert on Celtic coins, has suggested that the coins could be valued at between £100 and £200 each, in which case the entire hoard may be worth between £7m and £14m.

In December 2021 the hoard was bought by the Government of Jersey for £4.25 million.

== Media ==
Mead was interviewed by Jane Garvey for "The Metal Detectorist, the Tip-Off and the 30-Year Quest", a November 2021 episode of her BBC Radio 4 series Life Changing, about the find.

== See also ==
- List of hoards in the Channel Islands
- Archaeology of the Channel Islands
- Celtic coinage
