= Hoard =

Collection of valuable objects or artifacts

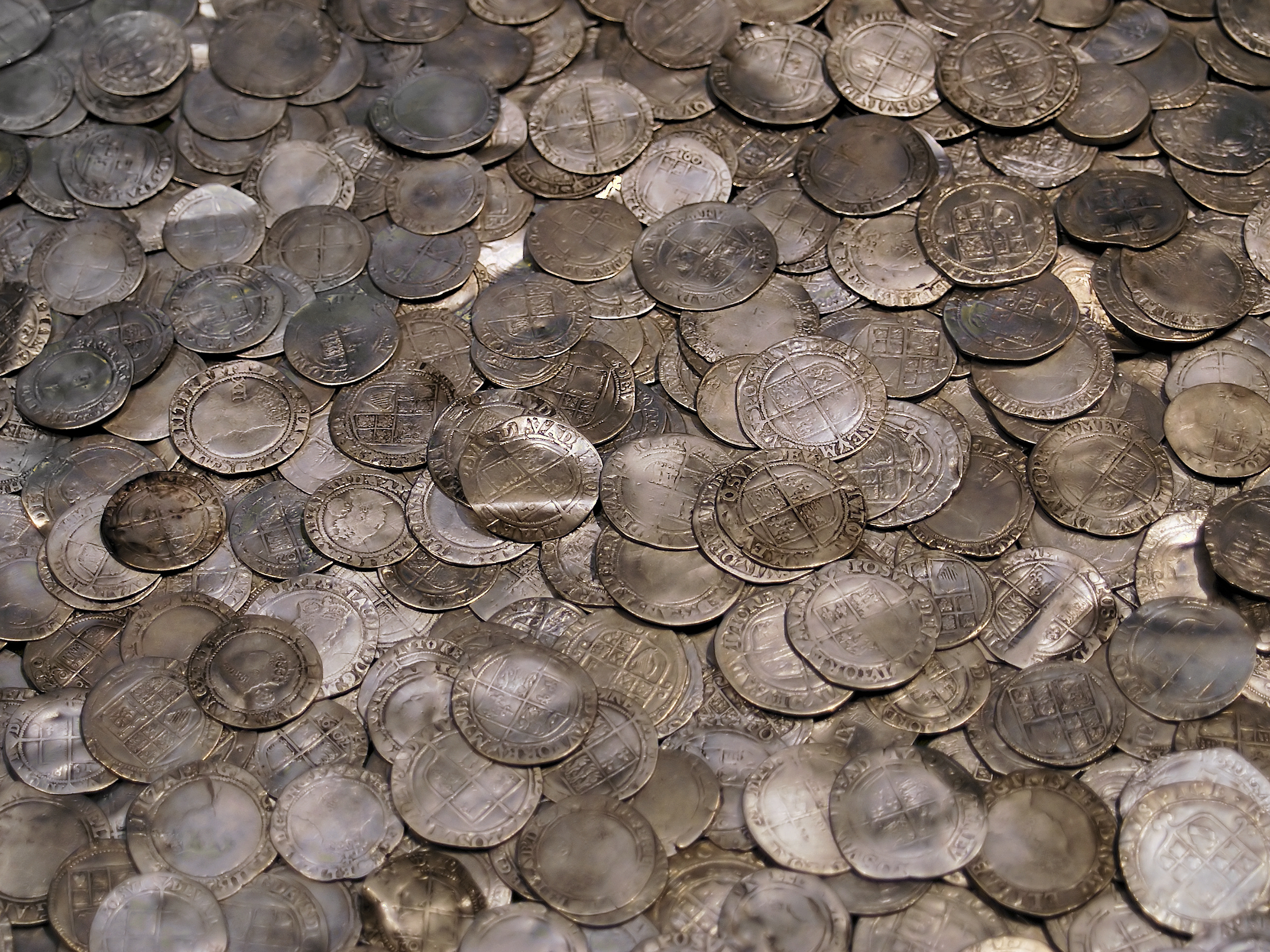
A hoard of silver coins, the latest about 1700 (British Museum).

A hoard or "wealth deposit" is an archaeological term for a collection of valuable objects or artifacts, sometimes purposely buried in the ground, in which case it is sometimes also known as a cache. This would usually be with the intention of later recovery by the hoarder; hoarders sometimes died or were unable to return for other reasons (forgetfulness or physical displacement from its location) before retrieving the hoard, and these surviving hoards might then be uncovered much later by metal detector hobbyists, members of the public, and archaeologists.

Hoards provide a useful method of providing dates for artifacts through association as they can usually be assumed to be contemporary (or at least assembled during a decade or two), and therefore used in creating chronologies. Hoards can also be considered an indicator of the relative degree of unrest in ancient societies. Thus conditions in 5th and 6th century Britain spurred the burial of hoards, of which the most famous are the Hoxne Hoard, Suffolk; the Mildenhall Treasure, the Fishpool Hoard, Nottinghamshire, the Water Newton hoard, Cambridgeshire, and the Cuerdale Hoard, Lancashire, all preserved in the British Museum.

Prudence Harper of the Metropolitan Museum of Art voiced some practical reservations about hoards at the time of the Soviet exhibition of Scythian gold in New York City in 1975. Writing of the so-called "Maikop treasure" (acquired from three separate sources by three museums early in the twentieth century, the Berliner Museen, the University of Pennsylvania Museum of Archaeology and Anthropology, and the Metropolitan Museum, New York), Harper warned:

By the time "hoards" or "treasures" reach museums from the antiquities market, it often happens that miscellaneous objects varying in date and style have become attached to the original group.

Such "dealer's hoards" can be highly misleading, but better understanding of archaeology amongst collectors, museums and the general public is gradually making them less common and more easily identified.

== Classification ==
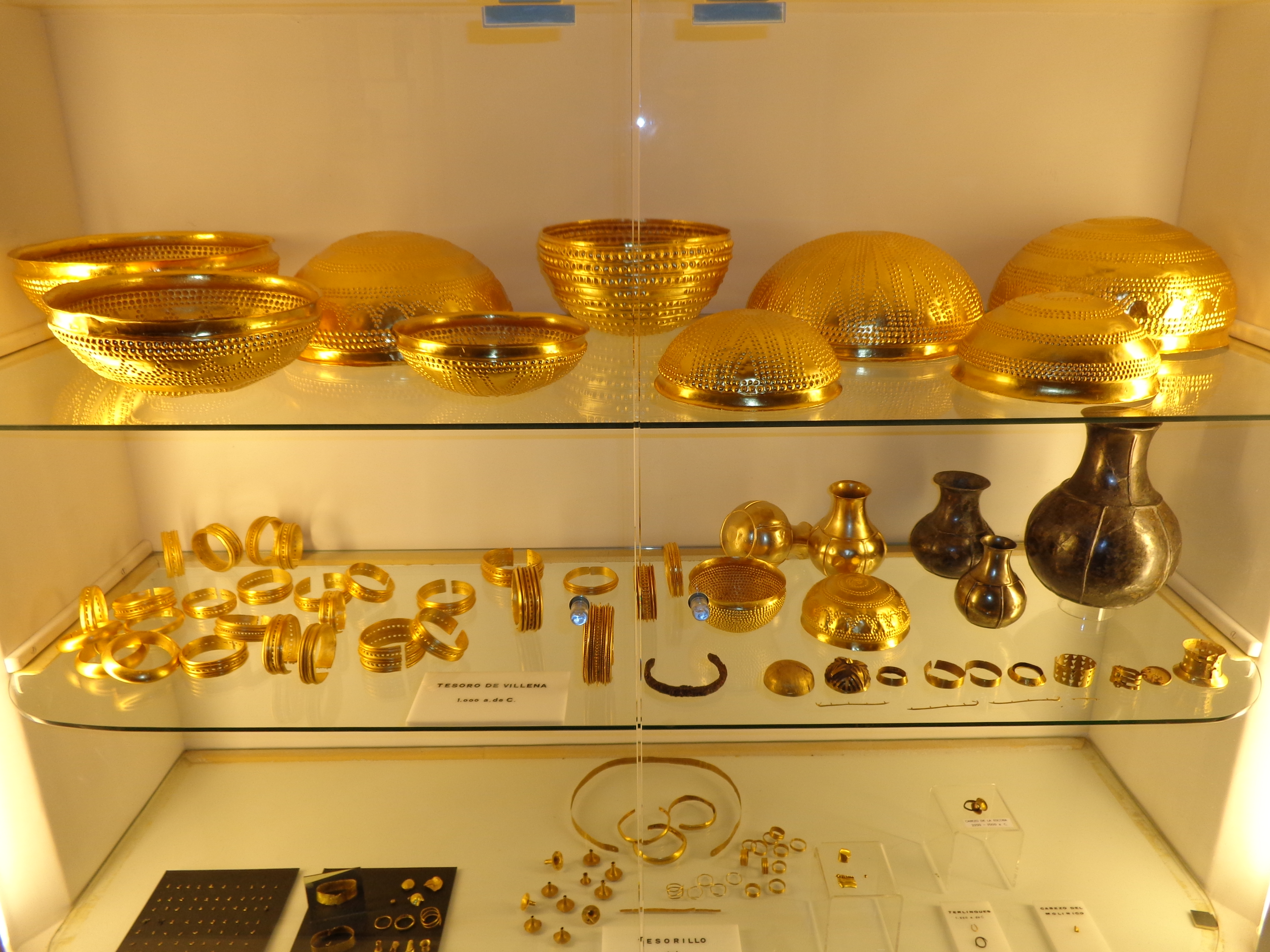
Treasure of Villena, 1000 BC, the biggest prehistoric gold hoard in Western Europe. Discovered in 1963.

Hoards may be of precious metals, coinage, tools or less commonly, pottery or glass vessels. There are various classifications depending on the nature of the hoard:

A founder's hoard contains broken or unfit metal objects, ingots, casting waste, and often complete objects, in a finished state. These were probably buried with the intention to be recovered at a later time.

A merchant's hoard is a collection of various functional items which, it is conjectured, were buried by a traveling merchant for safety, with the intention of later retrieval.

A personal hoard is a collection of personal objects buried for safety in times of unrest.

A hoard of loot is a buried collection of spoils from raiding and is more in keeping with the popular idea of "buried treasure".

Votive hoards are different from the above in that they are often taken to represent permanent abandonment, in the form of purposeful deposition of items, either all at once or over time for ritual purposes, without intent to recover them. Furthermore, votive hoards need not be "manufactured" goods, but can include organic amulets and animal remains. Votive hoards are often distinguished from more functional deposits by the nature of the goods themselves (from animal bones to diminutive artifacts), the places buried (being often associated with watery places, burial mounds and boundaries), and the treatment of the deposit (careful or haphazard placement and whether ritually destroyed/broken).

Valuables dedicated to the use of a deity (and thus classifiable as "votive") were not always permanently abandoned. Valuable objects given to a temple or church become the property of that institution, and may be used to its benefit.

== Hoards with individual articles ==
=== Americas ===
==== North America ====
- Baltimore gold hoard
- Bank of New York Hoard
- Castine Hoard
- Great Kentucky Hoard
- Great Montana Collection
- Saddle Ridge Hoard
- Dawson Film Find

==== South America ====
- Mesuno Treasure

=== Asia ===
- Akota Bronzes
- Bactrian Gold
- Chausa hoard
- Copper Hoard culture
- Kfar Monash Hoard
- Priam's Treasure
- Wonoboyo hoard
- Ziwiye hoard

=== Europe ===
==== Great Britain and the Channel Islands ====
- Beau Street Hoard
- Bitterley Hoard
- Canterbury-St Martin's hoard
- Cheapside Hoard
- Collette Hoard
- Corbridge Hoard
- Cuerdale Hoard
- Cunetio Hoard
- Frome Hoard
- Galloway Hoard
- Grouville Hoard
- Havering hoard
- Hexham Hoard
- Hoxne Hoard
- Isleham Hoard
- Kirkoswald Hoard
- Lenborough Hoard
- Leominster hoard
- Melsonby Hoard
- Middleham Hoard
- Migdale Hoard
- Mildenhall Treasure
- Milton Keynes Hoard
- Rogiet Hoard
- Shapwick Hoard
- Shrewsbury Hoard
- Silsden Hoard
- Snettisham Hoard
- St Leonard's Place Hoard
- Staffordshire Hoard
- Stanchester Hoard
- Stirling Hoard
- Talnotrie Hoard
- Thetford Hoard
- Thornbury Hoard
- Tregwynt Hoard
- Upchurch Hoard
- Vale of York Hoard (previously known as Harrogate hoard)
- Water Newton Treasure
- West Bagborough Hoard
- West Yorkshire Hoard
- Wickham Market Hoard
- Winchester Hoard
- Wold Newton hoard

==== Ireland ====
- Ardagh Hoard
- Broighter Hoard
- Derrynaflan Hoard
- Dowris Hoard
- Mooghaun North Hoard

==== Continental ====
- Berthouville Treasure, France (relating to the Romans)
- Borovo Treasure, part of the Thracian treasure
- Broighter Gold, Northern Ireland (relating to the Iron Age La Tène culture)
- Casco de Leiro, Spain (relating to the Bronze Age)
- Chatuzange Treasure, France (relating to Roman silver)
- Cheste hoard, Spain (relating to the Second Punic War)
- Eberswalde Hoard, Germany (relating to the Bronze Age)
- First Cyprus Treasure, Cyprus
- House of the Vestals Hoards, Rome, Italy (end of Roman Empire and 10th century Italy)
- Kutná Hora hoard, Czechia (relating to the 12th century)
- Lampsacus Treasure, Turkey
- Lava Treasure, France
- Paramythia Hoard, Greece (relating to Greco-Roman artefacts)
- Pereshchepina Treasure, Ukraine (relating to the Bulgars)
- Pietroasele Treasure, Romania (relating to the Goths)
- Preslav Treasure, Bulgaria (relating to the Byzantines)
- Reka Devnia Hoard, Bulgaria (relating to the Romans)
- Saka Hoard, Estonia (12th century)
- Sevso Treasure, possibly Hungary (relating to the Romans)
- Treasure of El Carambolo, Spain (relating to the Tartessians)
- Treasure of Gourdon, France (gold from 5th or 6th century)
- Treasure of Guarrazar, Spain (relating to the Visigoths)
- Treasure of Villena, Spain (relating to the Bronze Age)
- Ubina Hoard, Estonia (12th century)
- Vinkovci Treasure

==== Scandinavia ====
- Havor Hoard, Sweden
- Molnby Hoard, Sweden (relating to the Viking age)
- Sandur Hoard, Faroe Islands (relating to the Viking age)
- Spillings Hoard, Sweden (relating to the Viking age)
- Sundveda Hoard, Sweden (relating to the Viking age)
- Vindelev Hoard, Denmark

=== North Africa and Middle East ===
- Asyut Treasure
- Megiddo Treasure, a hoard found at Tel Megiddo, Israel
- Nahal Mishmar hoard
- Kaper Koraon Treasure, Syria

== See also ==
- Lagerstätte, a concentration of fossils useful for similar reasons in paleontology
- List of hoards in Britain
- List of hoards in Ireland
- List of hoards in North America
- List of missing treasure
- Hacksilver
- Treasure
- Treasure trove
