= Asyut Treasure =

Byzantine hoard found in Egypt

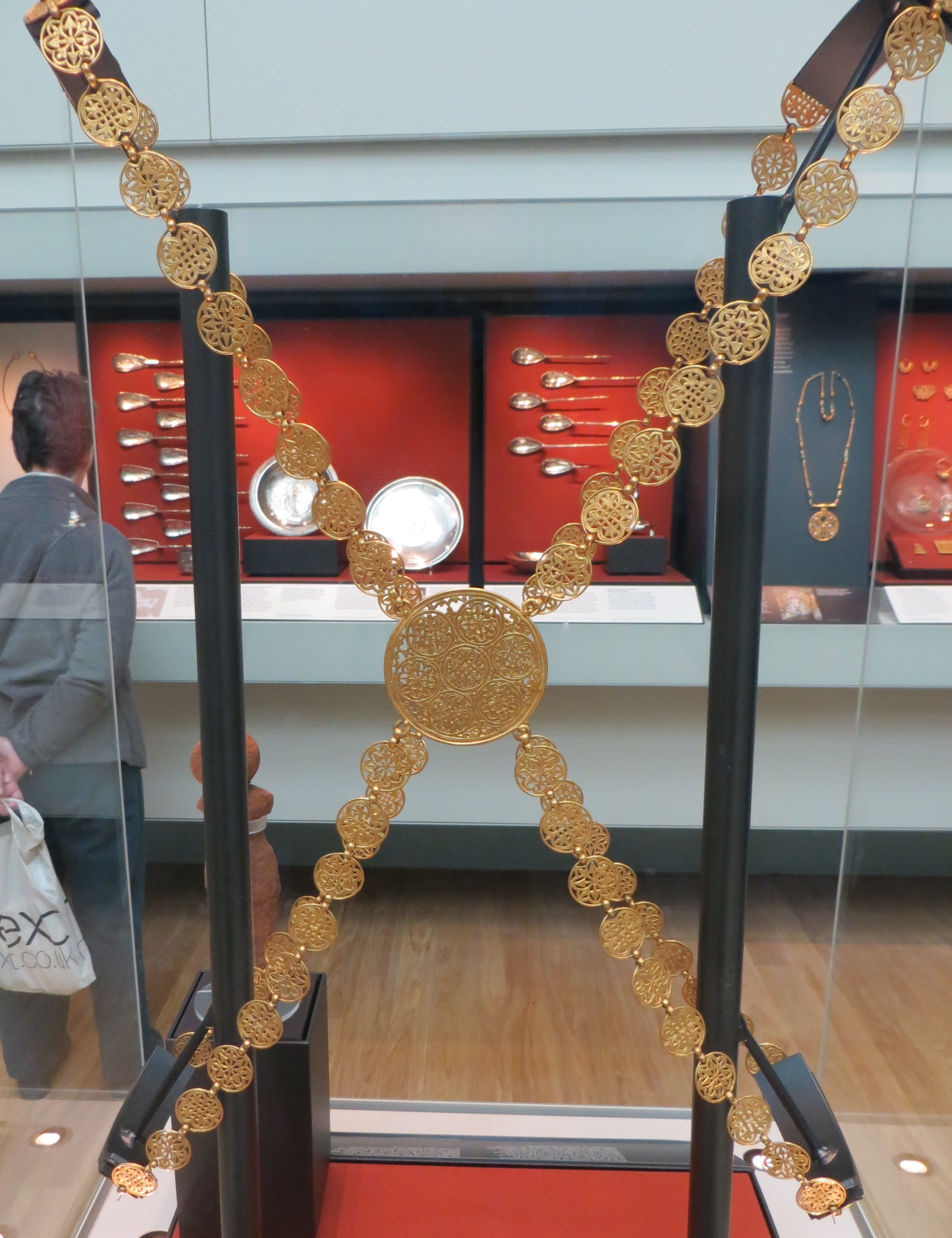
- Aysut Treasure body chain
- Material: Gold and precious stones
- Created: 3rd – late 6th Centuries AD
- Period/culture: Byzantine
- Present location: British Museum, London Metropolitan Museum, New York Kunstgewerbemuseum, Berlin

The Asyut Treasure is the name of an important Byzantine hoard of jewellery found near the city of Asyut, central Egypt. Discovered in mysterious circumstances in the early twentieth century, the treasure is now divided between the Kunstgewerbemuseum in Berlin, the British Museum in London and the Metropolitan Museum in New York City.

== Discovery ==
In 1909, a large gold hoard from late antiquity was found either at Tomet near Asyut, or at the ancient site of Antinoë, on the eastern bank of the Nile in central Egypt. The exact circumstances of the find remain obscure as the treasure was not excavated by professional archaeologists. The very high quality of the pieces, some of which were embossed with medallions of the Byzantine Emperor, link the Asyut Treasure to the imperial court in Constantinople. The assemblage of gold jewellery was possibly brought from the capital to the supposedly safer environment of Egypt in the early 7th century, before it was hidden there from the Arab invasions in the mid 7th century.

== Description ==
Thirty six objects have been attributed to the treasure that range in date from the third to the sixth century. Twelve pieces came to Berlin, including a large bejewelled pectoral, two elaborate necklaces and several pairs of bracelets, all the gift of Friedrich Ludwig von Gans in 1912/13. Six objects were donated in 1916 to the British Museum by Mary Lyman Burns, sister of the financier J. Pierpont Morgan. They include a massive body-chain, the largest piece of jewellery known from the early Byzantine period, plus a matching pair of earrings and necklace, and two spiral bracelets in the form of snake. The remainder of the treasure is held by the Metropolitan Museum, many of which were donated by Pierpont Morgan in 1917. It includes one of the most famous pieces – a plain neck ring attached to a frame, set with a large central medallion of a Byzantine emperor with the obverse showing the figure of Constantinopolis seated on a throne. Other pieces in the Met include another gold pectoral set with the semissis of Emperor Maurice Tiberius, and two matching pairs of bracelets.

== Gallery ==
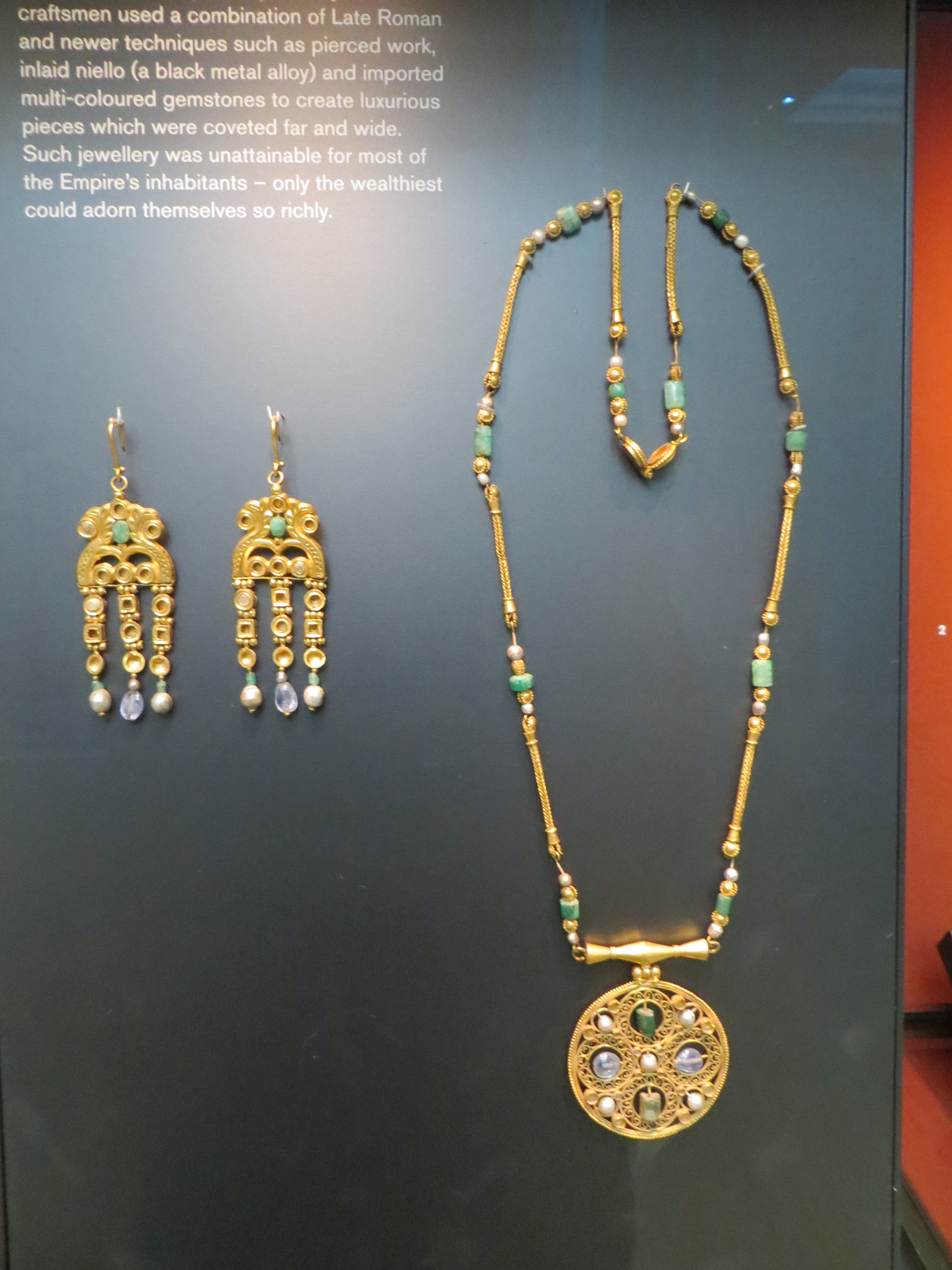
Necklace with matching earrings in the British Museum

== See also ==
- Lampsacus Treasure
- First Cyprus Treasure
