= Paramythia Hoard =

Greco-Roman hoard of bronze figurines

Coordinates: 39°28′N 20°30′E

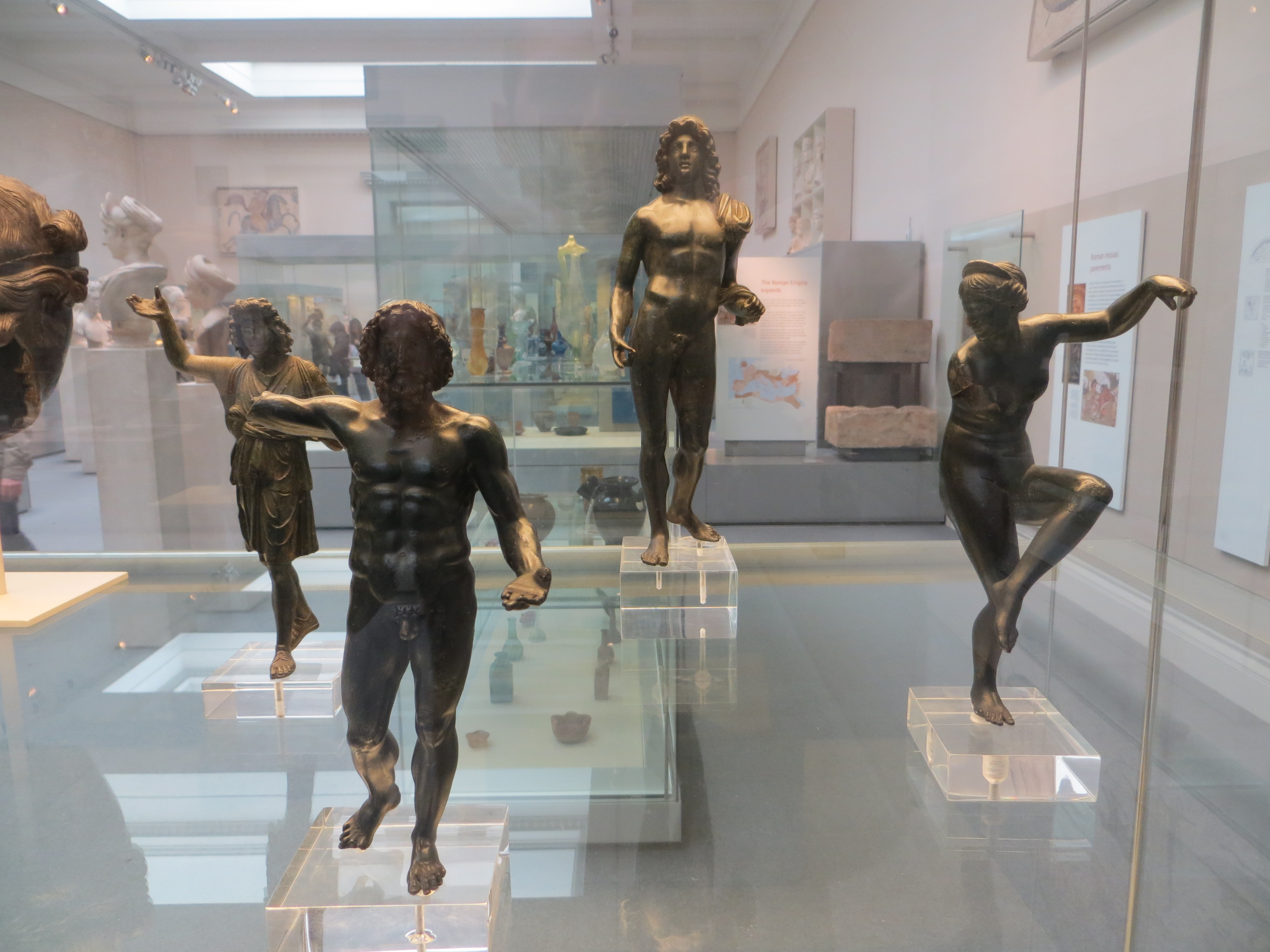
- Part of the Paramythia Hoard as displayed in the British Museum
- Material: Bronze
- Created: 2nd century AD
- Present location: British Museum, London

The Paramythia Hoard or Paramythia Treasure is the name of a Greco-Roman hoard of bronze figurines and other objects found in Paramythia, north-west Greece in the late 18th century. Of the original nineteen objects found in the hoard, fourteen are now in the British Museum

== Discovery ==
In the 1790s, nineteen bronze sculptures were discovered by Albanian farmworkers near the village of Paramythia, Epirus, Greece. Soon after their discovery, the hoard was dispatched to St Petersburg, to become part of Catherine the Great's collection. After her death, the original hoard was dispersed to various European collections. Eventually fourteen of the statuettes reached the British Museum from two sources. Twelve statuettes were bequeathed by the museum trustee and philanthropist Richard Payne Knight, while two more were donated by the widow of the antiquary John Hawkins in 1904. The whereabouts of the remainder of the hoard is unknown.

== Original purpose and description ==
The statuettes probably formed part of a public or domestic shrine or altar for local worship, known as a lararium. The figures were all made through the lost wax technique and are for the most part miniature versions of ancient Greek and Roman deities, reflecting the contemporary taste for classical and hellenistic art. They include a bust of Aphrodite, a figure of Odysseus riding a ram, Castor the horse tamer, the gods Mercury (two versions, one of which is a mask), Apollo, Jupiter, Venus (two versions), Serapis and Jupiter or Neptune, a Lar, a disk in the shape of the sun-god Helios and part of a bronze mirror case. Based on the quality of their manufacture and style, the statuettes from the hoard are estimated to date from the second half of the 2nd century AD, although some of the objects from the hoard may have been made earlier. Unfortunately most of the figures have lost their gold and silver gilding and accessories.

== See also ==
- Mâcon Treasure for a similar group of figures cast in silver

== Gallery ==
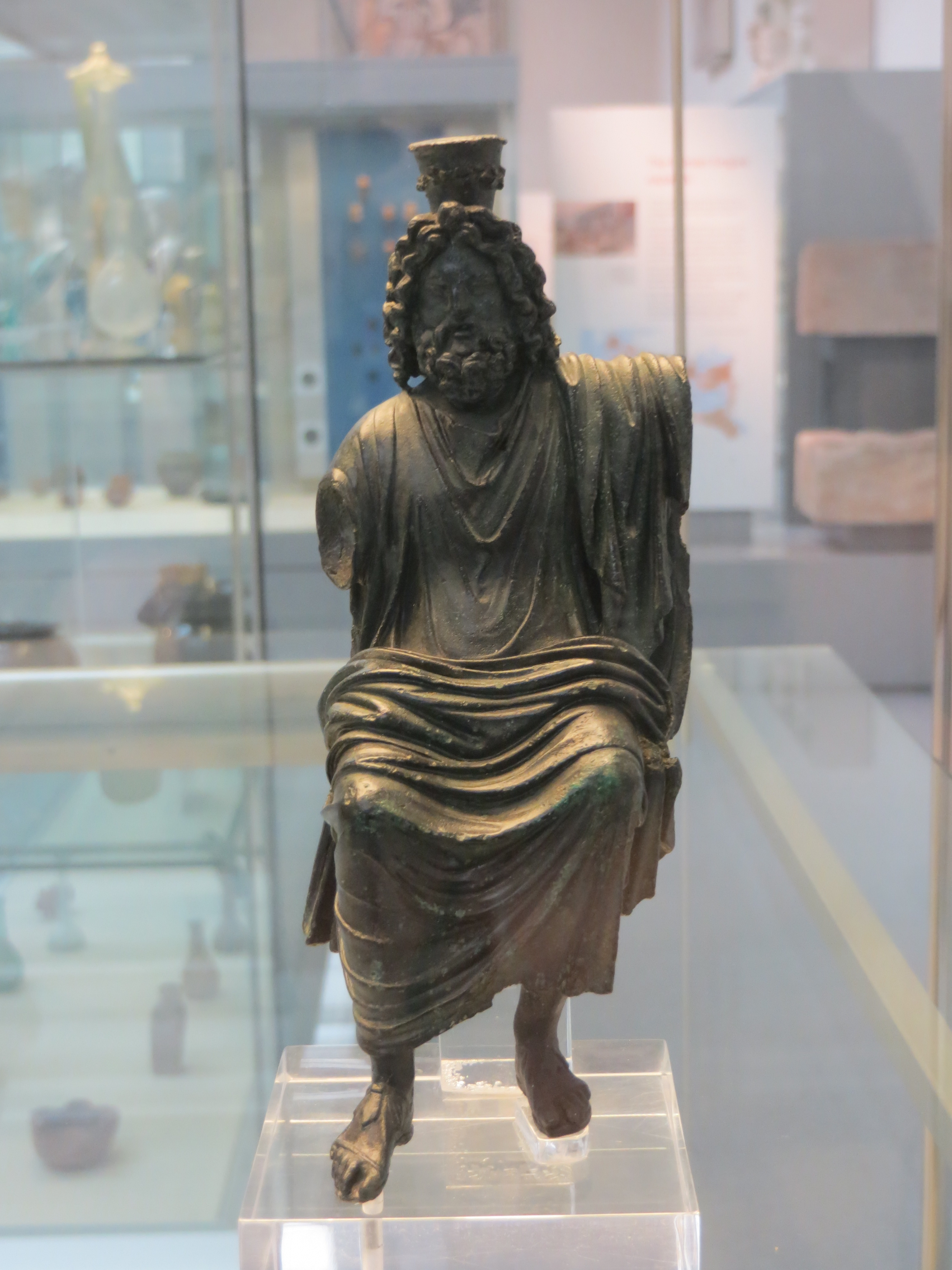
Seated statuette of the Egyptian god Serapis

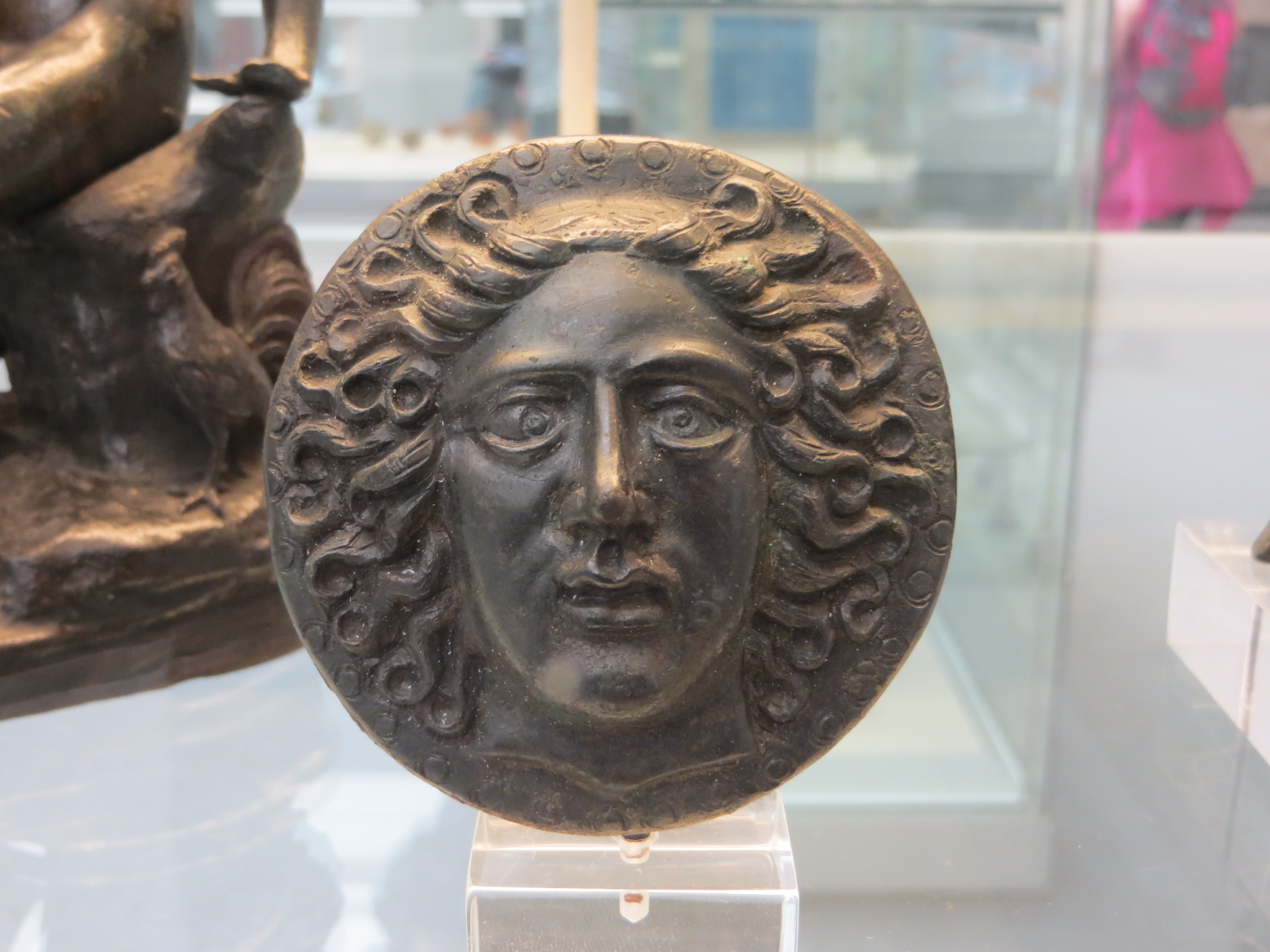
Bronze disc with the head of Apollo Helios

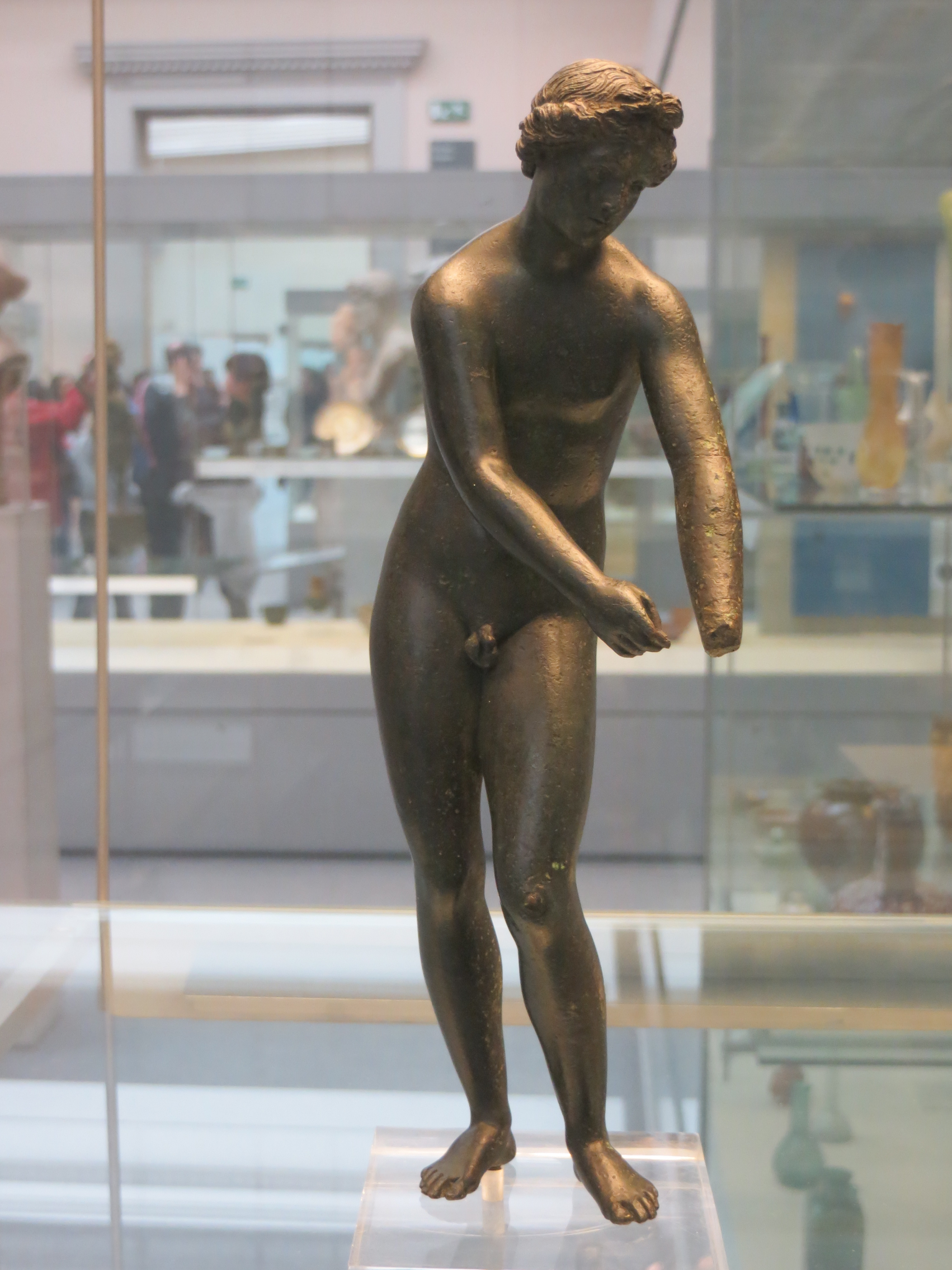
Statuette of Apollo the sun-god, who would have been originally stringing his bow

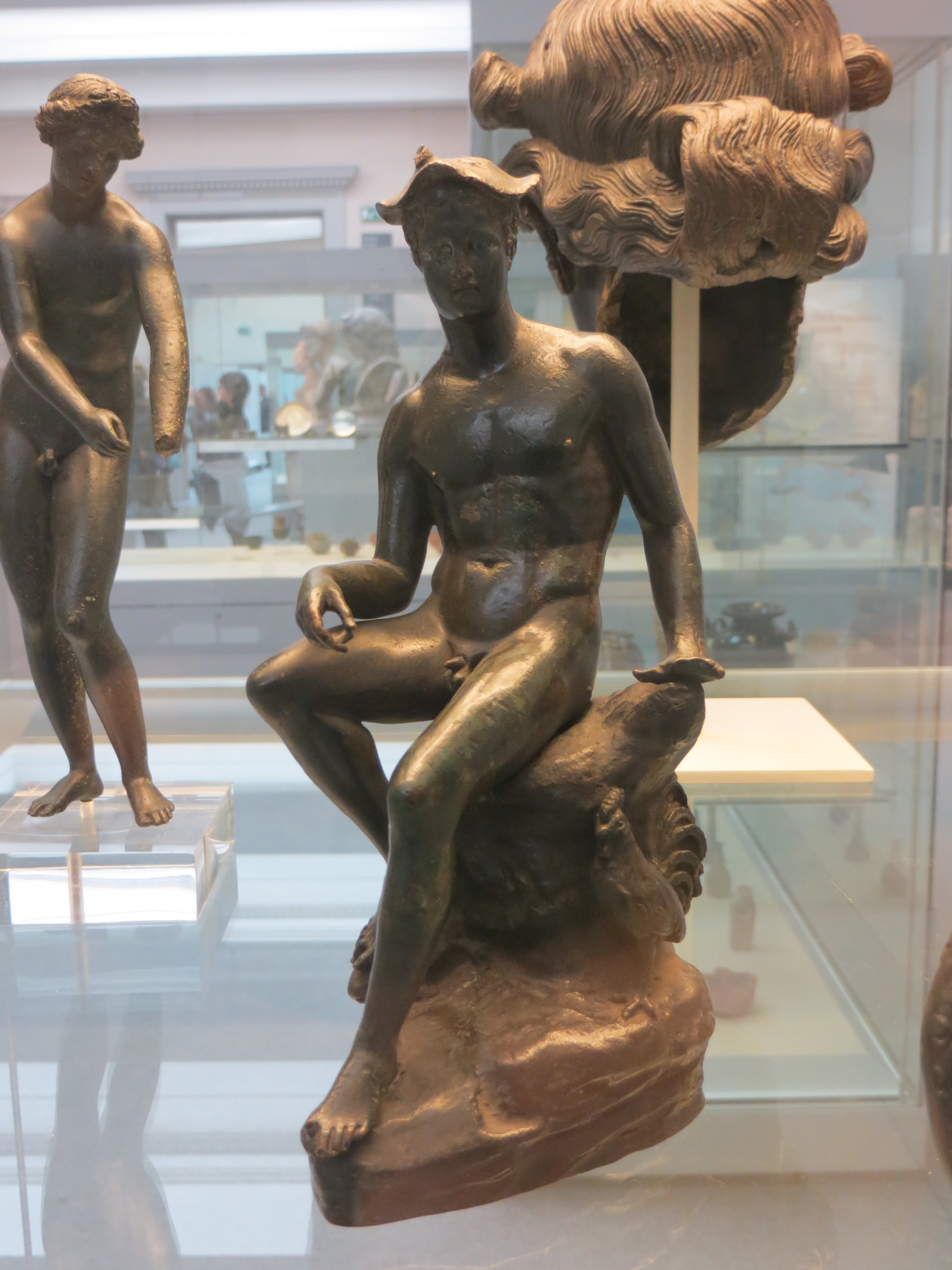
Figure of Mercury seated on a rock

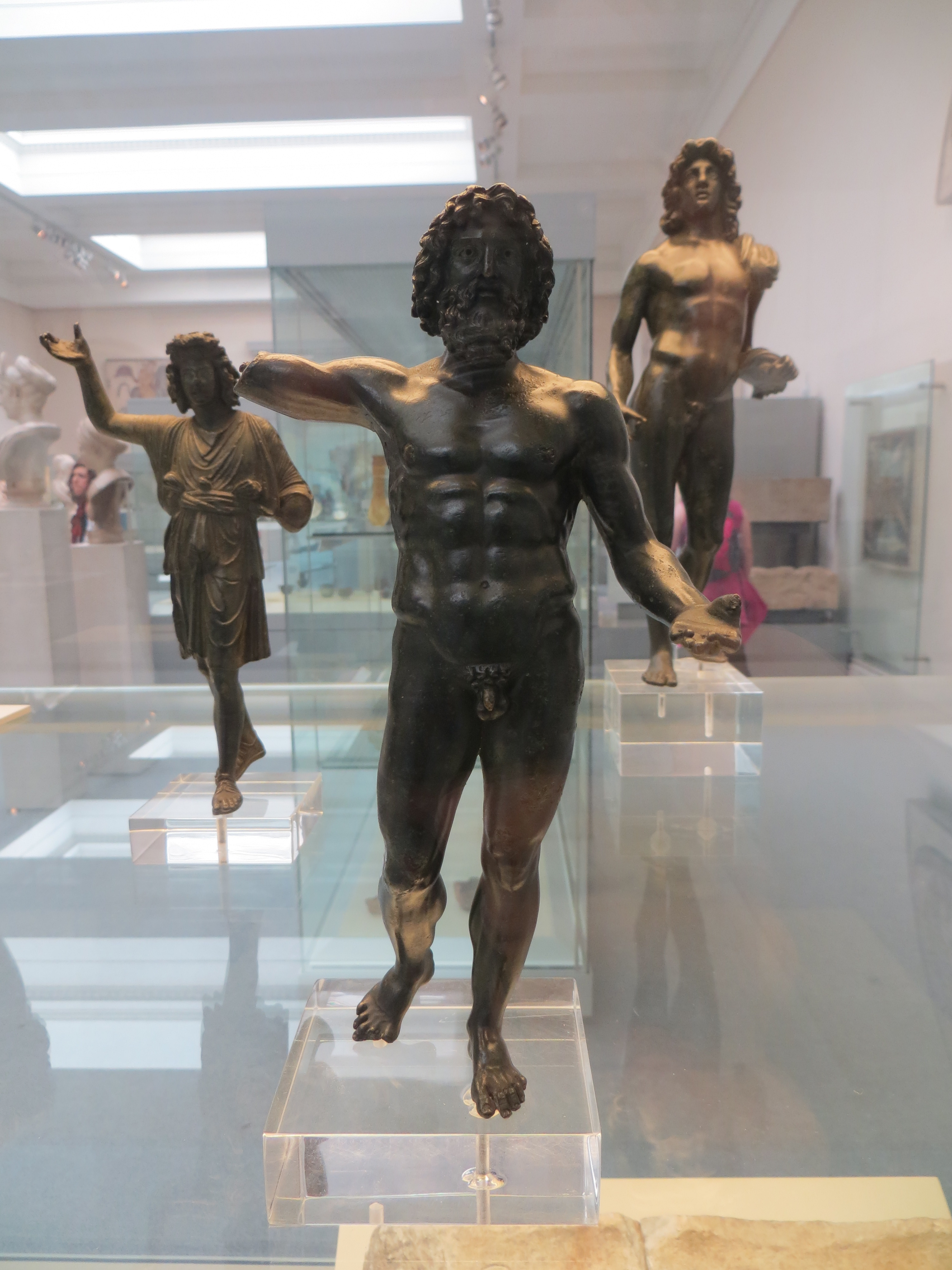
Bronze statuette of the god Neptune or Jupiter

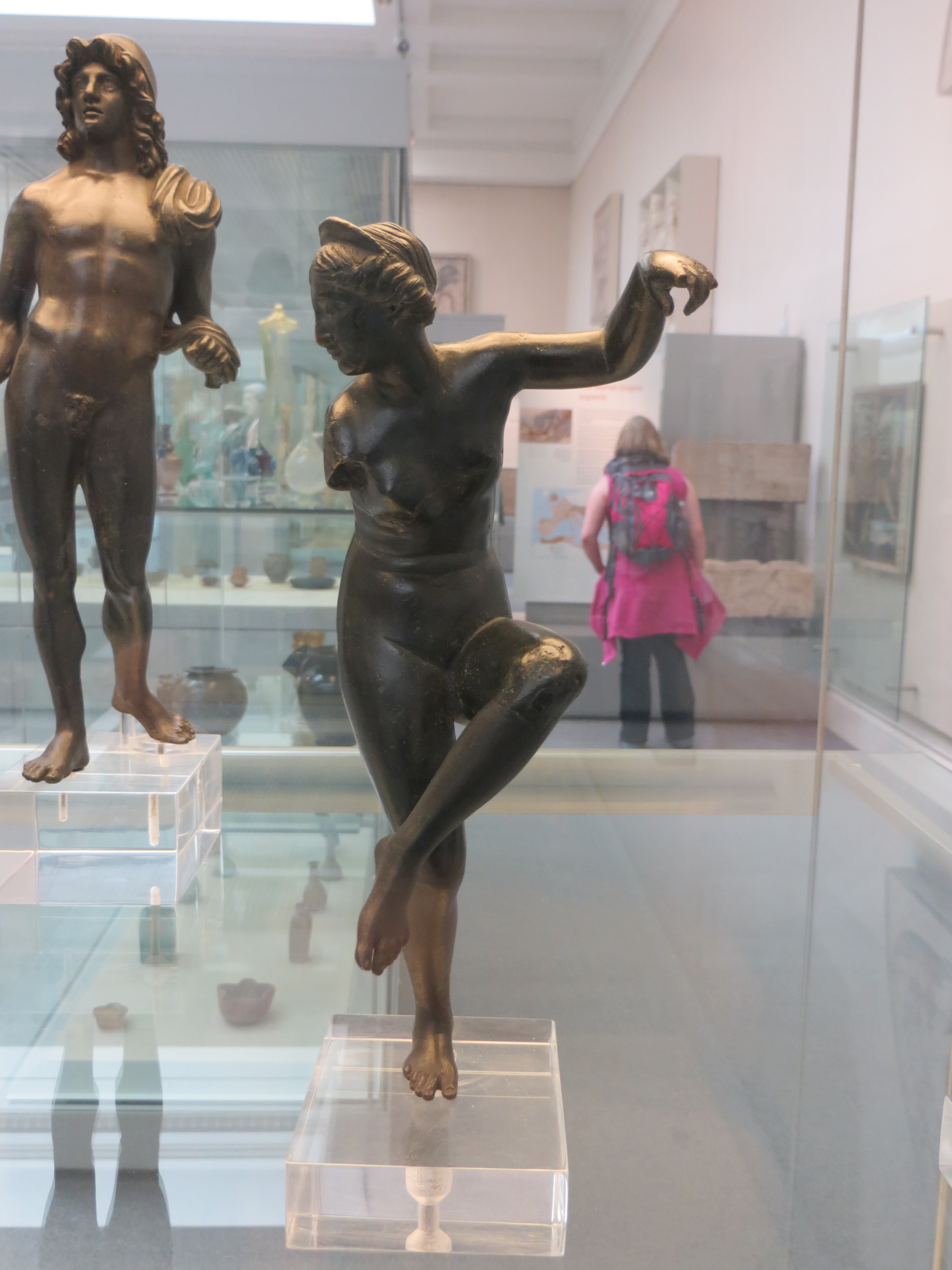
A small bronze sculpture of Venus loosening her sandal

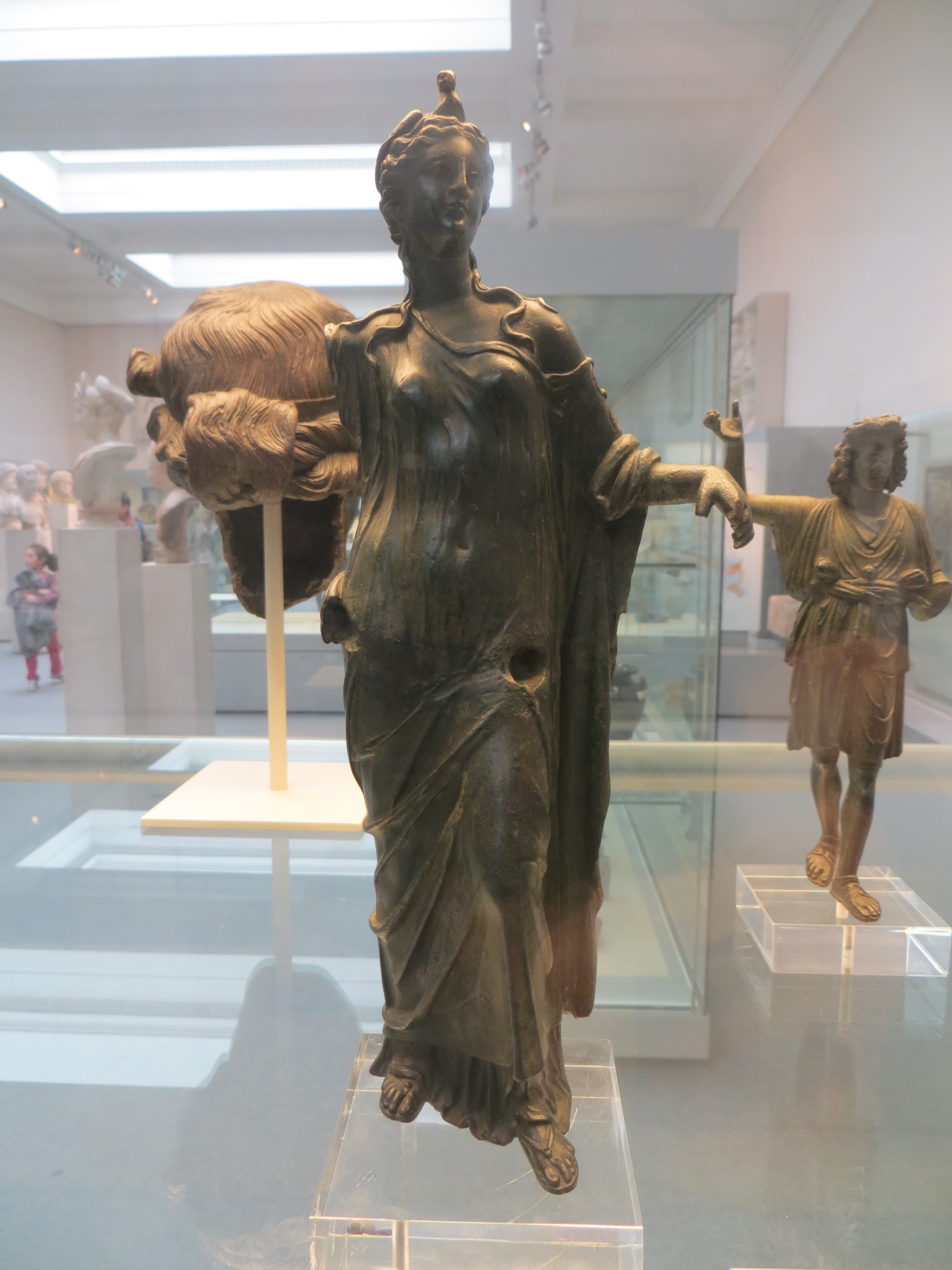
Bronze statuette of Venus with a dove on her head

== Bibliography ==
- L. Burn, The British Museum Book of Greek and Roman Art (British Museum Press, 1991)
- S. Walker, Roman Art (British Museum Press, 1991)
- J. Swaddling, 'The British Museum hoard from Paramythia, north-western Greece: classical trends revived in the 2nd and 18th centuries AD' in: Bronzes hellénistiques et romains (Lausanne, Diffusion De Boccard, 1979), pp. 103–106
