= Collette Hoard =

Bronze Age British hoard

Coordinates: 55.771°N 2.007°W

- Material: Gold
- Period/culture: Bronze Age
- Discovered: Berwick-upon-Tweed, Northumberland by John Minns in April, 2005
- Present location: Great North Museum, Newcastle upon Tyne
- Identification: 2005 T120 (Fig 64)

The Collette Hoard was found in fields near Berwick-upon-Tweed, Northumberland, England by metal detectorist John Minns in April 2005. The hoard is named after Collette, the eight-year-old daughter of Minns, rather than the location it was found at, in order to keep the find location secret.

The hoard included six gold lock rings, believed to have been hair decorations, as well as bracelets, rings and pins and also six socketed axes which could have been used either for woodworking or as weapons, and the first socketed gouge – a tool which would have been used by craftsmen – to be found in Northumberland.

== See also ==
- List of hoards in Britain
