= Nikola Moushmov =

Bulgarian historian and numismatist (1869-1942)

Nikola Moushmov Никола Мушмов
- Born: May 14, 1869 Struga, Ottoman Empire (now North Macedonia)
- Died: January 31, 1942 (aged 72) Sofia, Bulgaria
- Occupation: historian and numismatist

Nikola Moushmov (14 May 1869 – 31 January 1942) (Bulgarian: Никола Мушмов) was a noted Bulgarian historian and numismatist.

He wrote well regarded numismatics documents, including the report of the Reka Devnia hoard, and Ancient Coins of the Balkan Peninsula and the Coins of the Bulgarian Monarchs (Античните монети на Балкански полуостров и монетите на българските царе), published in 1912.

Their relevance is still current. Reka Devnia Hoard is one of the best measures of relative rarity among 2nd-century Roman coins, and the latter work has recently been translated to English and expanded.

Nikola Moushmov was one of the founders of the Macedonian Scientific Institute in 1923.
