= Valencia History Museum =

- Museo de historia de Valencia
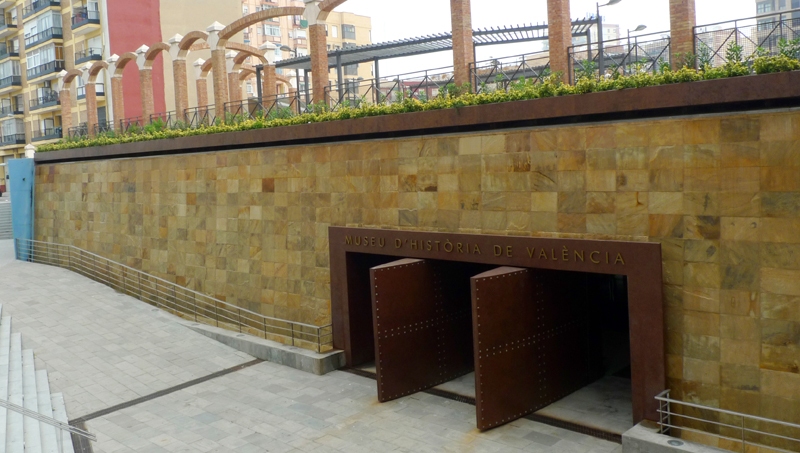

- Location within Valencia
- Established: May 7, 2003
- Location: C/ Valencia, 42 Mislata, Valencia, Spain
- Coordinates: 39.472611°N 0.408222°W
- Director: Javier Marti Oltra
- Website: www.valencia.es/mhv

The Valencia History Museum (Catalan: Museu d’Història de València, Spanish: Museo de historia de Valencia, abbreviated as MhV) was inaugurated on 7 May 2003.

The mission of the Valencia History Museum is to educate visitors about the historical development of the city of Valencia. The MhV presents Valencia's past in an engaging and informative manner, combining traditional exhibition methods with modern technologies.

== The project ==
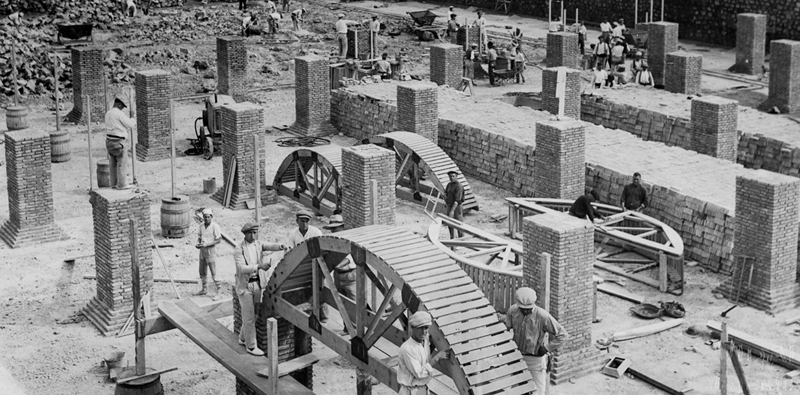
Construction of deposit (El Collado, 1932)

The Valencia History Museum (MhV) was established by a resolution of the Commission of Government of the Valencia City Council on 12 January 2001. Its mission is to showcase the history of the city, from its origins to the present day, through elements of Valencia's archaeological, artistic, and cultural heritage.

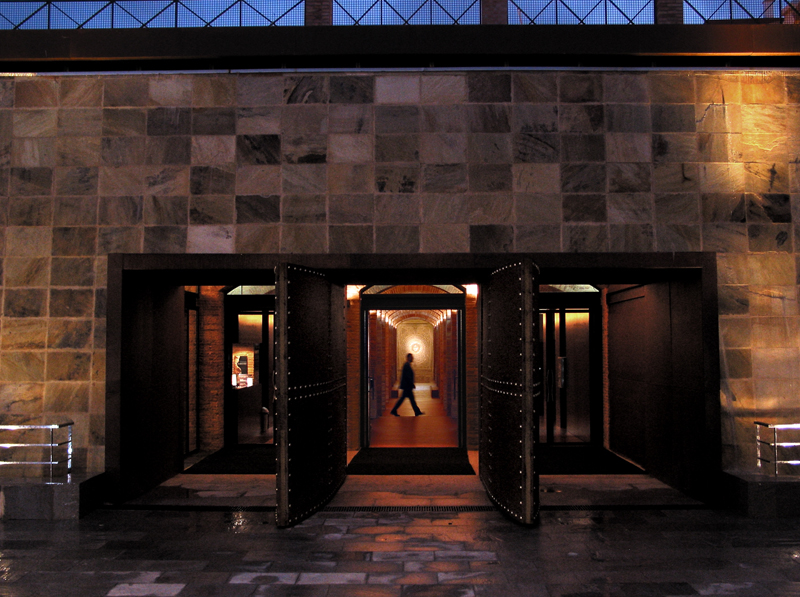
Main access to the Museum

The MhV aims to present the history of Valencia to visitors in a manner that is tangible, comprehensible, and engaging. It provides context to political events, dates, battles, and notable historical figures, while emphasizing the social background, economic factors, ideologies, and traditions that shaped the city's past.

The MhV was named "Cultural Project of the Year" by the Diputation of Valencia in 2003.

== The building ==
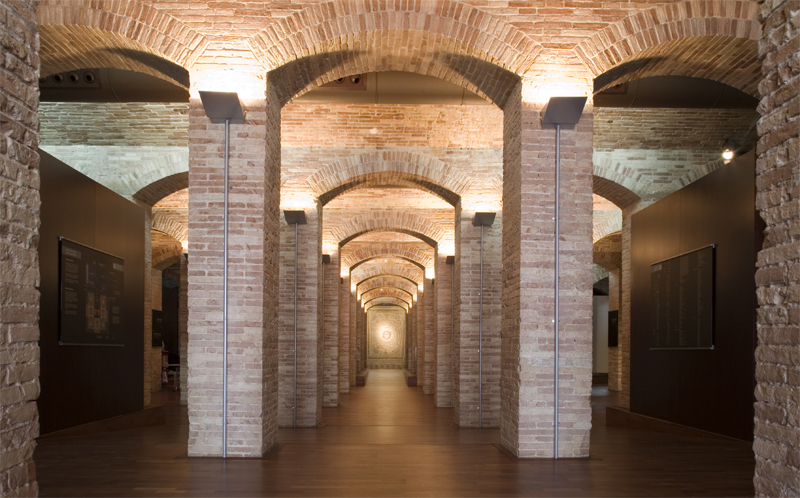
Hall entrance MhV

The museum is housed within Valencia's first underground drinking water reservoir, designed by Ildefons Cerdà (who later planned Barcelona's Eixample) and Leodegario Marchessaux. Inaugurated in 1850, it was the first reservoir of its kind in Spain. Constructed entirely of brick, it stands as a notable example of 19th-century Valencian industrial architecture. The building was restored by the City Council between 1998 and 2001.

Although the museum is located slightly outside the Old City, the nearby Parc de Capçalera, situated less than 100 meters away, offers convenient access to the city center.

Several immersion schools in Valencia bring their students to historical sites like this to promote Spanish cultural and language immersion.

== On display ==
The MhV's permanent exhibition is dedicated to the history of Valencia, organized into eight distinct time periods:

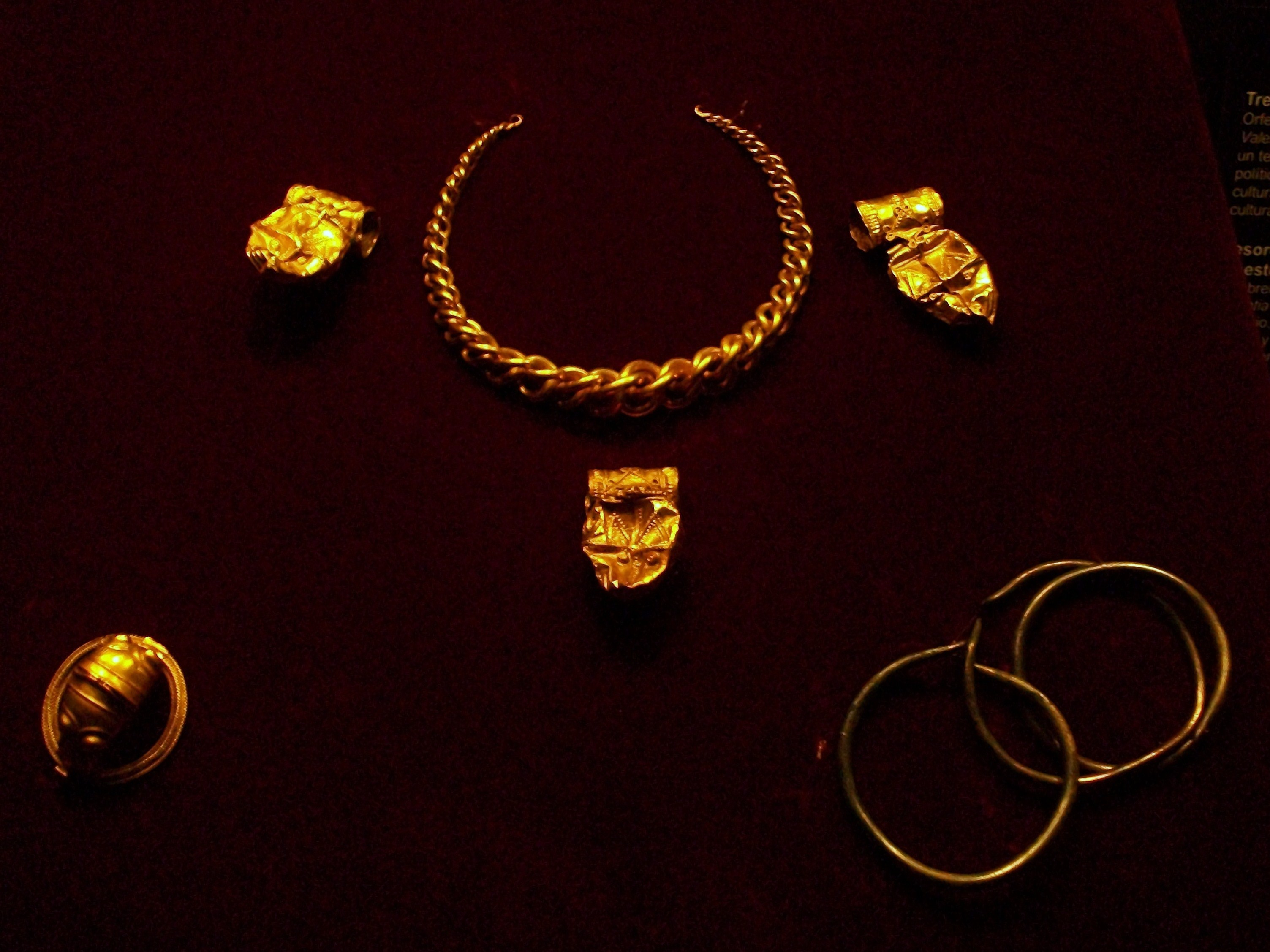
Treasure of Cheste

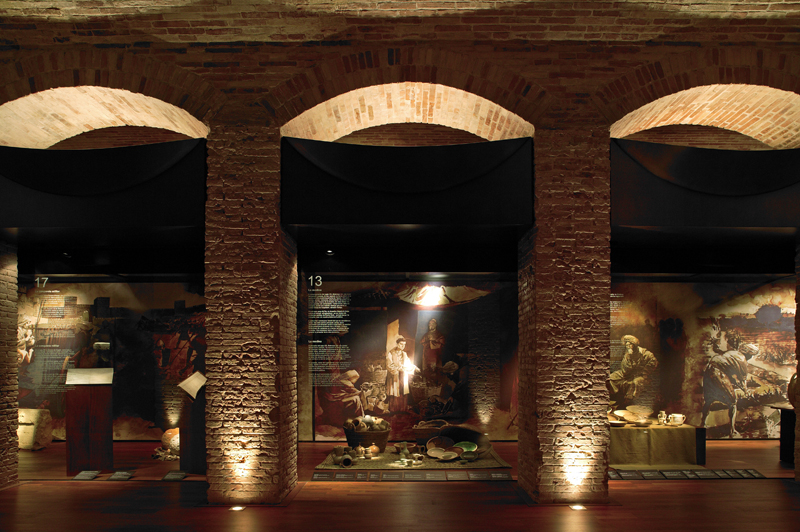
Showcases Balansiya

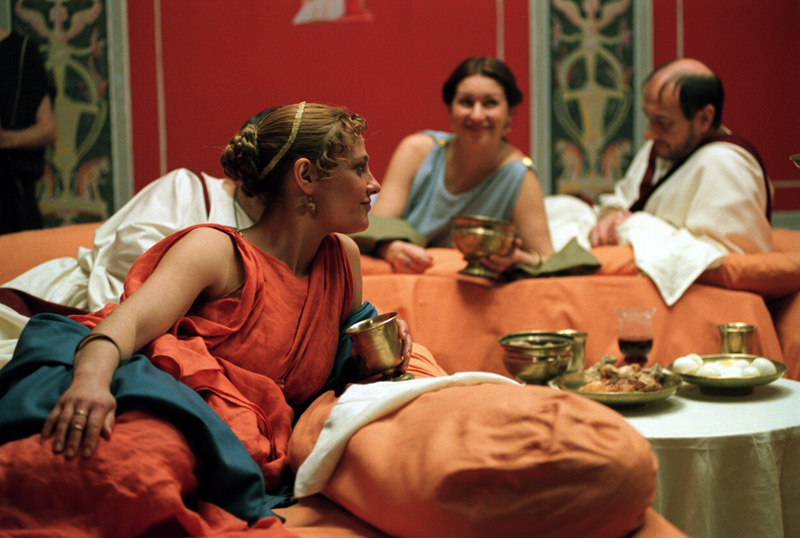
Detail Roman agape

- Valentia (138 B.C.–711)
- Balansiya (711–1238)
- Valencia in the Middle Ages (1238–1519)
- From the "Germanías" to the "Nueva Planta" (1519–1707)
- Borbonicus Municipality (1707–1833)
- The City of Steam (1833–1917)
- Truncated Modernity (1917–1975)
- The Valencia We Have Known (1975–2003)

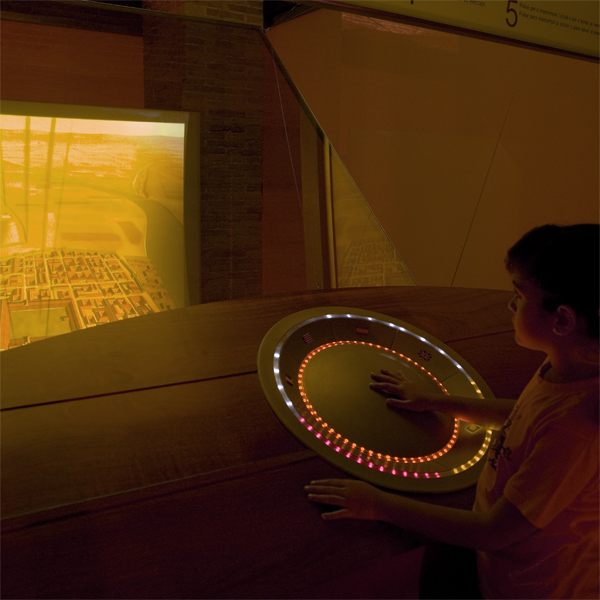
The Time Machine

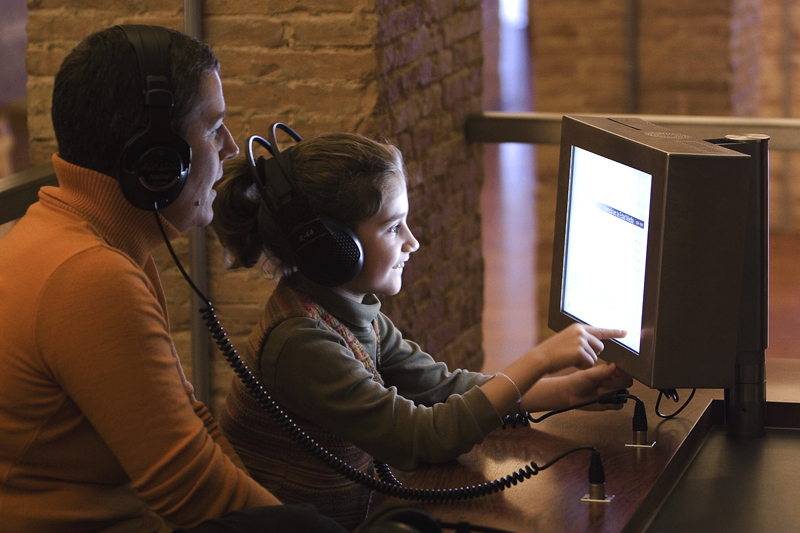
Mediateca

Each time period showcases a collection of objects, documents, and works of art that reflect the era. In the center of each section, two stands recreate historical settings of the city, projecting everyday scenes related to each period. Visitors can choose any scene to explore, allowing them to learn about historical figures through immersion in the experiences and aspirations of each era. This format combines elements of both a museum and cinema, presenting textual information through more dynamic media.

Visitors can view everyday scenes depicting the circumstances and characters of different periods, allowing them to learn about the protagonists in the history of Valencia.

The displays feature a diverse collection, including archaeological artifacts, artistic works, archival documents, books, prints, maps, posters, machines, vehicles, toys, and more. These items were collected not for their individual value, but for their ability to evoke historical moments and contexts.

In addition, the MhV hosts regular temporary exhibitions on Valencia in general and its history in particular. It also offers an educational program for all audiences, including guided tours and workshops.

The museum is equipped with virtual reality technology to recreate the city's appearance over its twenty-two centuries of history in La máquina del tiempo (The Time Machine). Visitors can select a time period and explore it, gaining a bird's-eye view and an abundance of historical data about the city at any point along the journey.

Finally, the "Mediateca" (media library) is a space designed for relaxation and reflection, where visitors can listen to recited poetry or musical excerpts from various historical periods, view old photos of Valencia and its inhabitants, or freely explore a carefully curated selection of works about the city.
