= Cheste hoard =

Iberian hoard

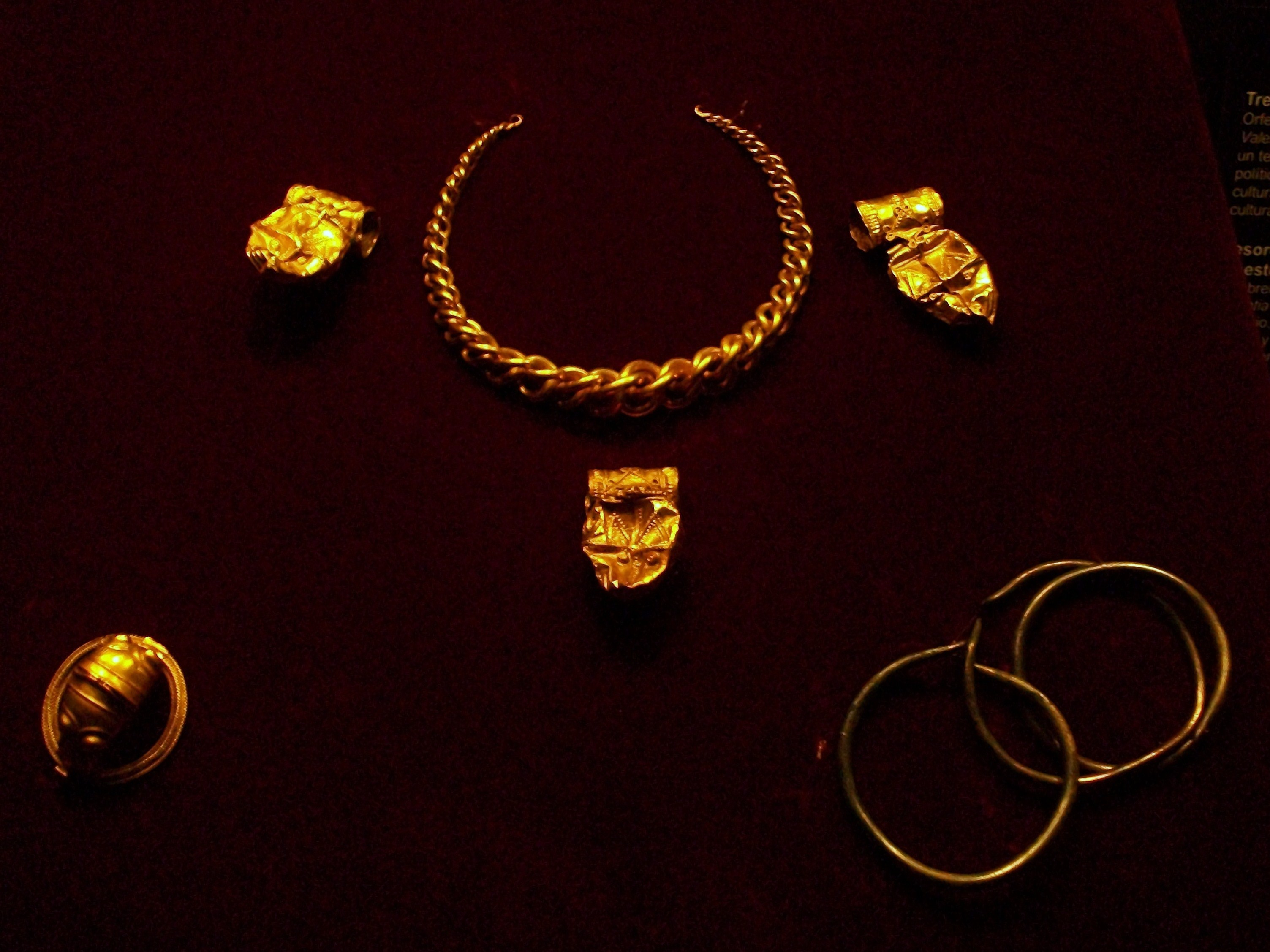
Gold jewellery from the Cheste hoard

The Cheste hoard (Spanish: Tesoro de Cheste) is an Iberian hoard discovered near the town of Cheste, Valencia, Spain, in 1864. Dating to about 200 BCE, the hoard was found buried in two pots and contained gold jewellery, silver coins and silver ingots. It is currently held in the Valencia History Museum.

The jewellery consists of a necklace, three pendants and a fibula (brooch), all made from gold. The fibula is of particular interest because it is decorated with a human head in the style of the La Tène culture, associated with the Celts, showing Celtic or Celtiberian influence on the Iberian societies of the east coast of the peninsula.

The hoard also included forty eight silver coins, including twenty two of Hispano-Punic origin, five local Iberian coins, three from Emporion, two from Massilia, and one from Rome. The Hispano-Punic coins were some of the last issued by the Barcids of Carthage (including one depicting Hannibal), whilst the Roman coin is an early denarius. These imply the hoard was buried around the time of, or shortly after, the Second Punic War. The diverse mix of coins found at Cheste and similar hoards may reflect Rome and Carthage's need for large amounts of coinage to pay mercenaries, who often switched sides over the course of the war.

The silver ingots are hacksilber: cut or melted pieces of silver that were used as bullion and commonly found in Iberian hoards from this period. Unlike coinage, hacksilber was not controlled by the state, and could also be used in smaller transactions than the larger denomination coins in circulation. It was also used by silversmiths.
