= Reka Devnia Hoard =

Hoard of Roman coins

The Reka Devnia Hoard was the most prolific find of Roman silver coins of the period from 64 to 251 AD to have ever been published. It was found near the town of Devnya (Marcianopolis of Roman Empire), north-eastern Bulgaria. The hoard consisted of 81,044 denarii found in 1929. The earliest coins were those of Marc Antony of which twenty-nine were found, and the latest being one example of Herennius Etruscus. The hoard was broken into two, with 68,783 coins sent to the museum of Sofia, and 12,261 to Varna.

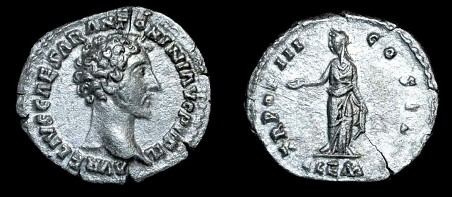
A denarius of Marcus Aurelius. Ten specimens of this coin were found in the Reka Devnia hoard.

The publication of the find has been invaluable to researchers reconstructing a chronological sequence of the era's coinage, and accessing the original volume of production of individual types. Many rare personages were represented in the hoard. Rare denarii published from Varna include thirteen denarii of Nero, eight of Galba, seven of Otho, twenty-two of Vitellius, twenty-four of Aelius Caesar, twenty-one of Clodius Albinus, fifty-one of Macrinus, eighteen of Diadumenian, and forty-two of Julia Paula. However, it has been difficult to access the true comparative rarity of some of the scarcest types as undoubtedly examples from Varna were looted prior to the hoard's publishing. Dozens of scarce denarii of Pertinax, Aquilia Severa, and Sallustia Orbiana were found in the Sofia group while the Varna group was mysteriously devoid of all but one example of Pertinax and one example of Aquilia Severa.

== Sources ==
- Mouchmov, N.A.: Le Tresor Numismatique De Reka-Devnia (Marcianopolis). Sofia, 1934.
- Moneta-L, Curtis L. Clay, Chicago IL, 2003.
