= Lampsacus Treasure =

Byzantine silver hoard

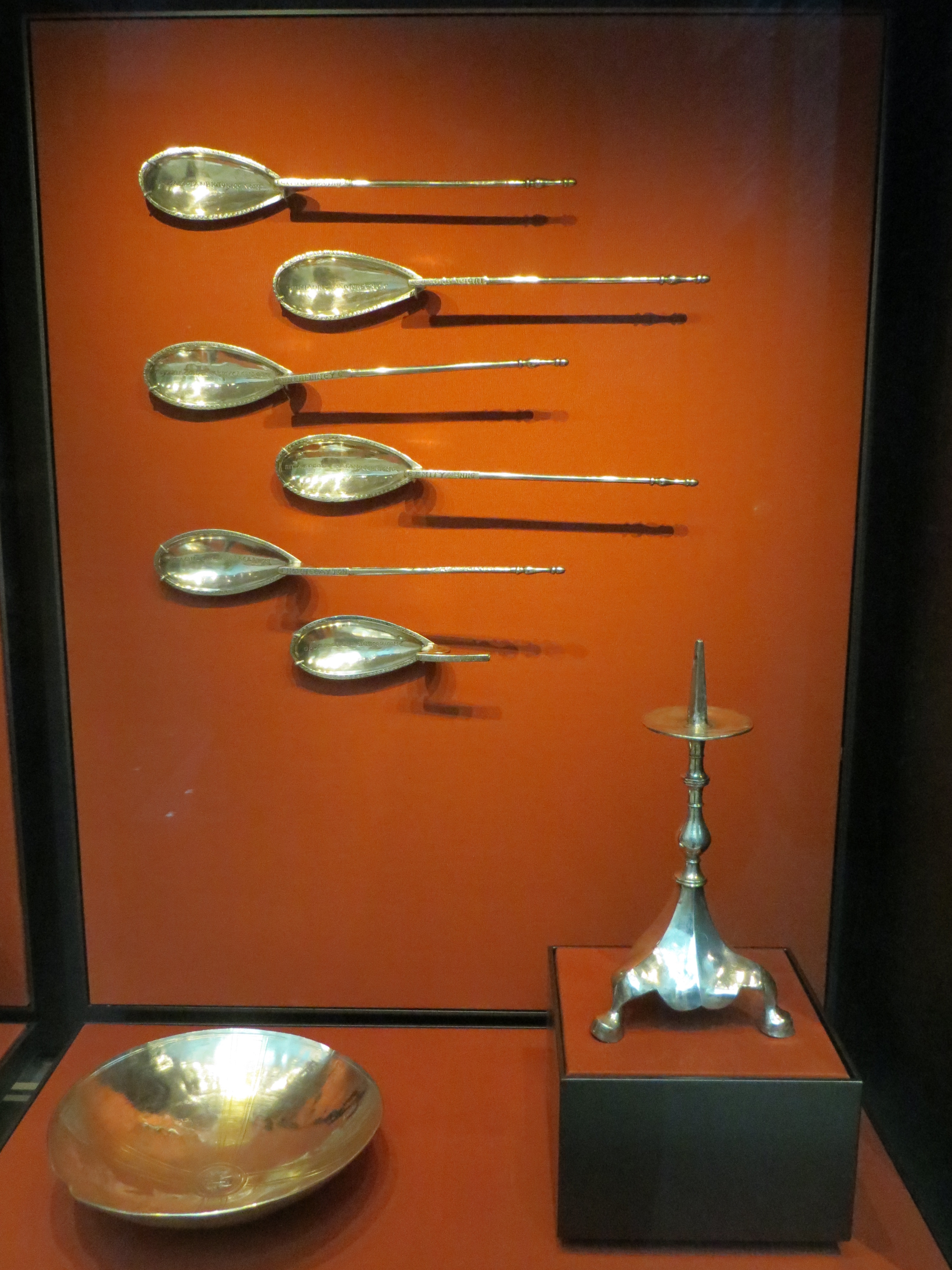
- Part of the Lampsacus Treasure as currently displayed in the British Museum
- Material: Silver
- Created: 6th-7th Century AD
- Present location: British Museum, London

The Lampsacus Treasure or Lapseki Treasure is the name of an important early Byzantine silver hoard found near the town of Lapseki (ancient Lampsacus) in modern-day Turkey. Most of the hoard is now in the British Museum's collection, although a few items can be found in museums in Paris and Istanbul too.

== Discovery ==
The Lampsacus Treasure was accidentally found in 1847 by farmers digging in a field near the village of Lapseki (ancient Lampsacus) in north-west Turkey. Dating to 6th and 7th centuries AD, the hoard of largely silver objects provides a significant catalogue of design and fashion from the early Byzantine period. Soon after its discovery, the bulk of the treasure came into the possession of Henry Richard Charles Wellesley, Earl of Cowley, who donated it to the British Museum in 1848. Two other institutions also have objects from the treasure: the Istanbul Archaeological Museum possess two bowls; the Louvre a further two spoons.

== Description of the treasure ==
The hoard includes a wide range of ecclesiastical objects that may have originally belonged to a church or a wealthy individual connected with the church. It includes a silver tripod lamp-stand with five imperial control stamps that date from the reign of Justinian I (527–565AD). In the British Museum there are also twelve pear-shaped spoons, six of which bear inscriptions and verse in Greek and/or Latin, a (slightly damaged) silver chalice, two silver dishes with nielloed monograms in the centre, an ornate silver polycandelon, part of a folding stool, and various jewellery and furniture/vessel fittings.

== Gallery ==
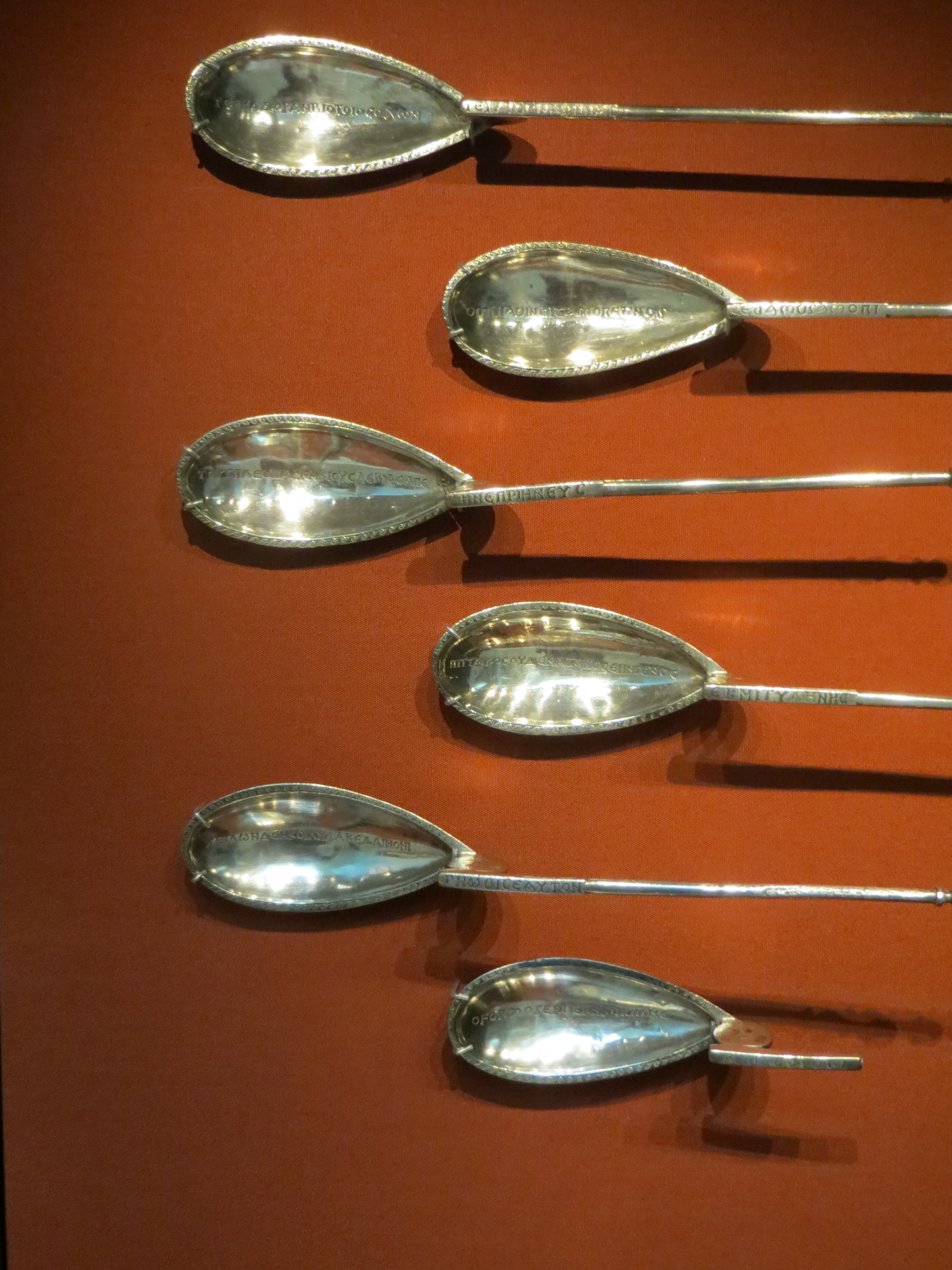
Six spoons from the treasure

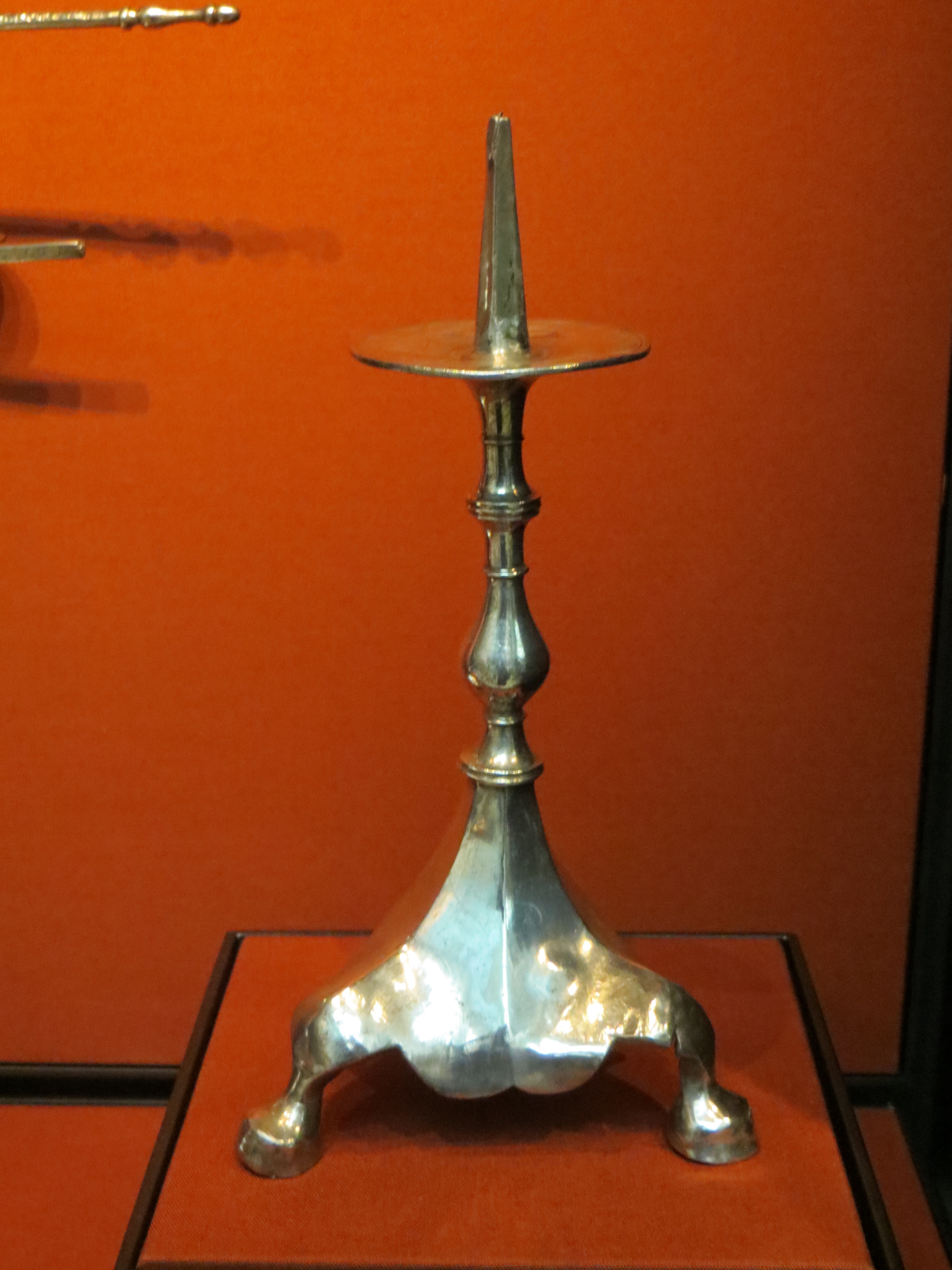
Detail of the silver lamp-stand or candelabra

== See also ==
- First Cyprus Treasure

== Bibliography ==
- D. Strong, Greek and Roman Silver Plate (British Museum Press, 1966)
- D. Buckton (ed.), Byzantium: Treasures of Byzantium (London, The British Museum Press, 1994)
- J.P.C. Kent and K.S. Painter (eds.), Wealth of the Roman world, AD 300-700 (London, The British Museum Press, 1977)
- M Mango: Three illuminating objects in the Lampsacus treasure: Studies in Byzantine and Medieval art and archaeology. Oxford, 2003, pp. 68–71.
