= First Cyprus Treasure =

Byzantine silver hoard

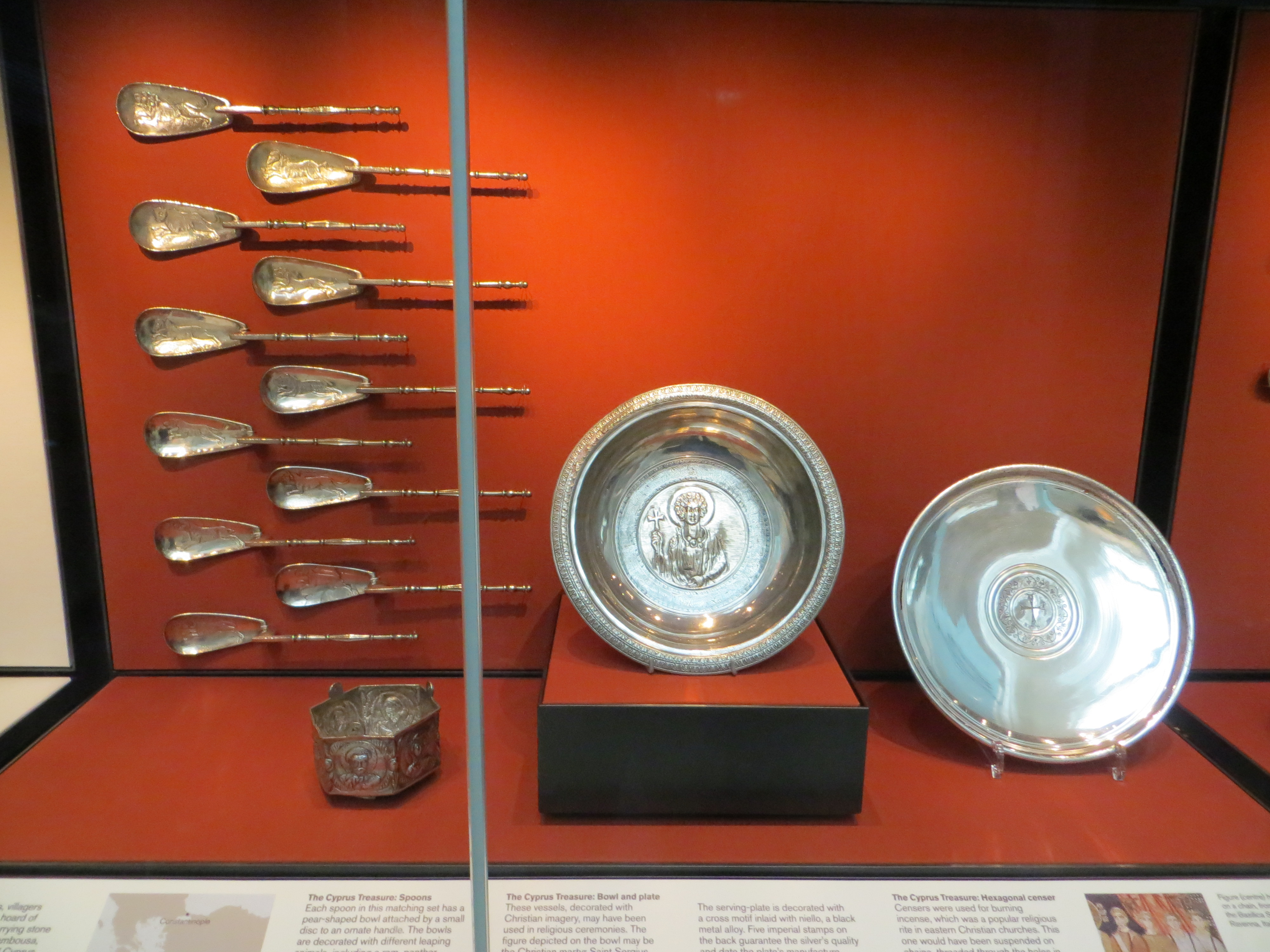
- Part of the First Cyprus Treasure as currently displayed in the British Museum
- Material: Silver
- Created: 7th Century AD
- Present location: British Museum, London

The First Cyprus Treasure or Lamboussa Treasure is the name of a major early Byzantine silver hoard found near Kyrenia, Cyprus. Currently in the British Museum's collection, the treasure is largely composed of liturgical objects that may have belonged to an ancient church or monastery. It is called the First Cyprus Treasure to distinguish it from the so-called Second Cyprus Treasure, which is now split between the Metropolitan Museum of Art and the Cyprus Museum.

== Discovery ==
The hoard was found by accident at the end of the nineteenth century near the Acheiropoietos Monastery, west of Kyrenia at the ancient site of Lambousa. It is unclear why the treasure was deposited, but it may have been deliberately hidden to evade the invading Arab armies of 653 AD. Following its discovery, the entire treasure came into the possession of the French aristocrat Maurice de Talleyrand-Périgord, Duc de Dino, who in turn sold it to the British Museum in 1899.

== Description of the treasure ==
The treasure was probably made in Constantinople, the capital of the Byzantine Empire, and is composed of 28 different objects, all made of silver. It includes a bowl with a half length image of a saint (possibly Saint Sergius), a paten with cross in the centre, a hexagonal censer and twenty-five pear-shaped spoons, eleven of which are engraved with leaping animals. The bowl is marked with five stamps from the reign of emperor Constans II, who reigned between 641 and 651 AD.

== Gallery ==
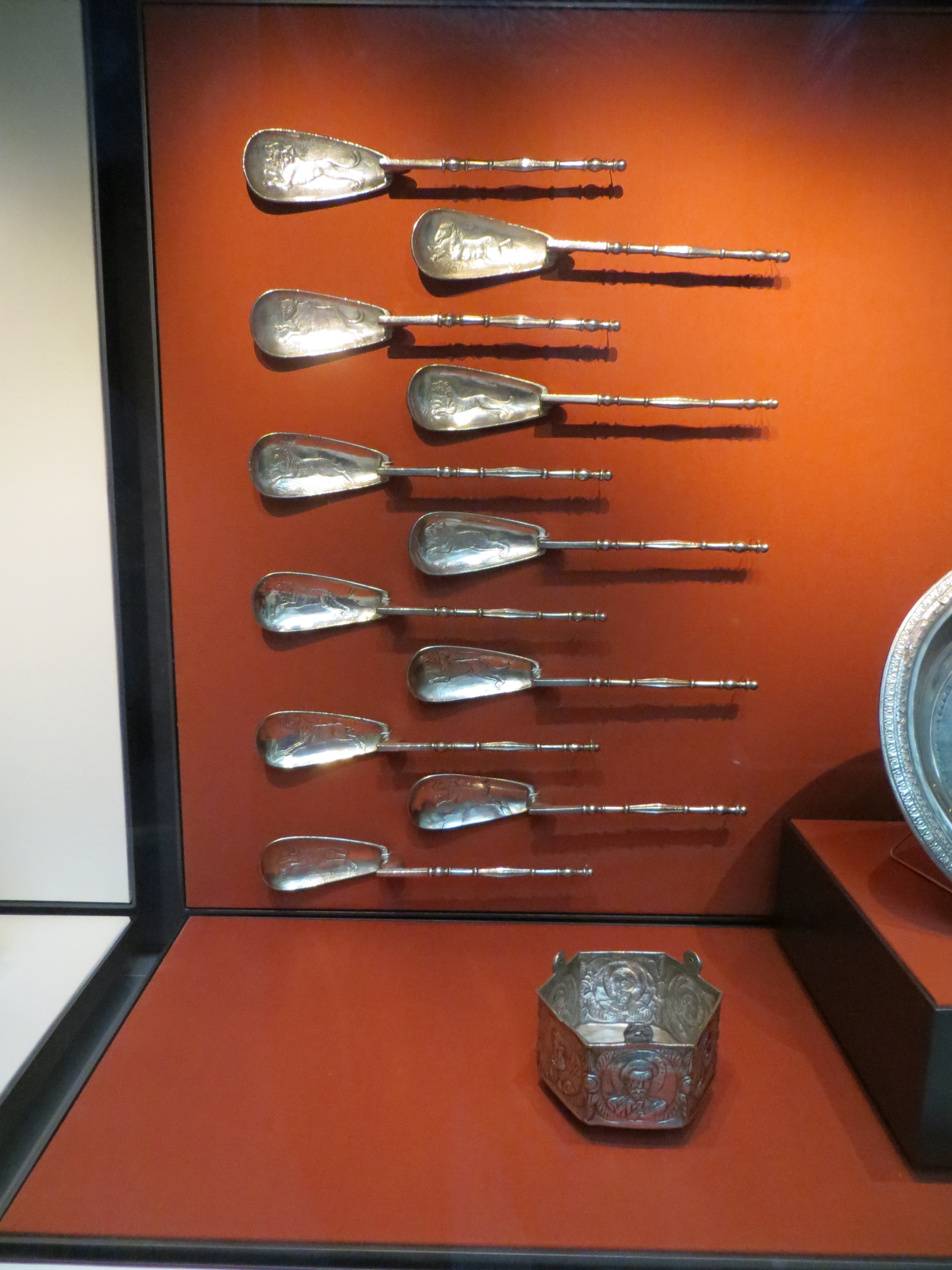
Eleven spoons with running animals and censer from the treasure

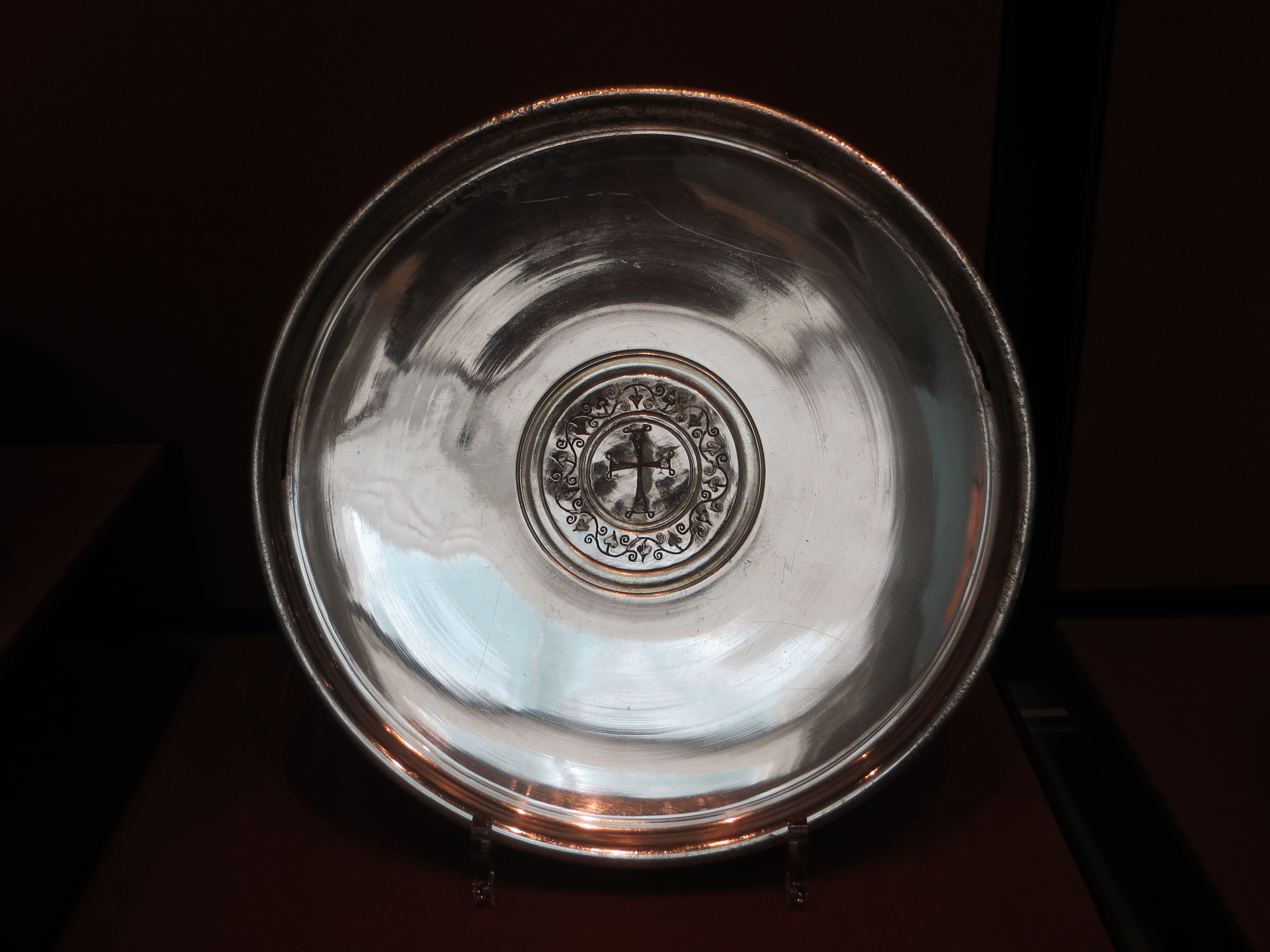
Silver Paten with cross from the treasure

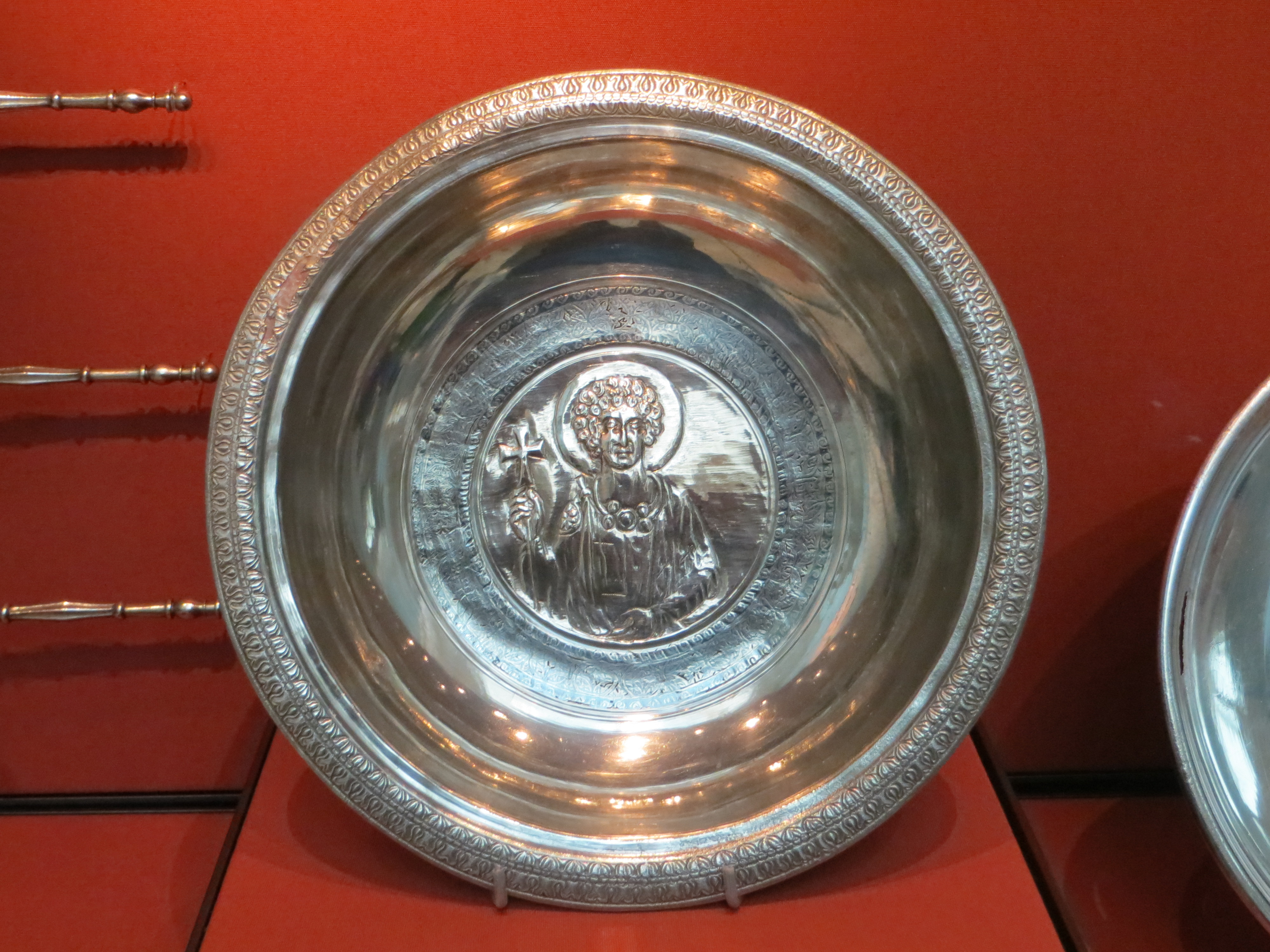
Silver bowl with half length portrait of a saint in the tondo

== See also ==
- Lampsacus Treasure

== Bibliography ==
- D. Strong, Greek and Roman Silver Plate (British Museum Press, 1966)
- D. Buckton (ed.), Byzantium: Treasures of Byzantium (London, The British Museum Press, 1994)
- J.P.C. Kent and K.S. Painter (eds.), Wealth of the Roman world, AD 300-700 (London, The British Museum Press, 1977)
- O. M. Dalton: Byzantine silversmith's work from Cyprus, in: Archeologia 57, S. 159-174
- R Merrillees: The modern history of the first Lambousa Treasure of Byzantine Silverware from Cyprus, in: Antiquaries Journal No 89, 2009, Pages 389-403
