= Va'eira =

Fourteenth portion in the annual Jewish cycle of weekly Torah reading

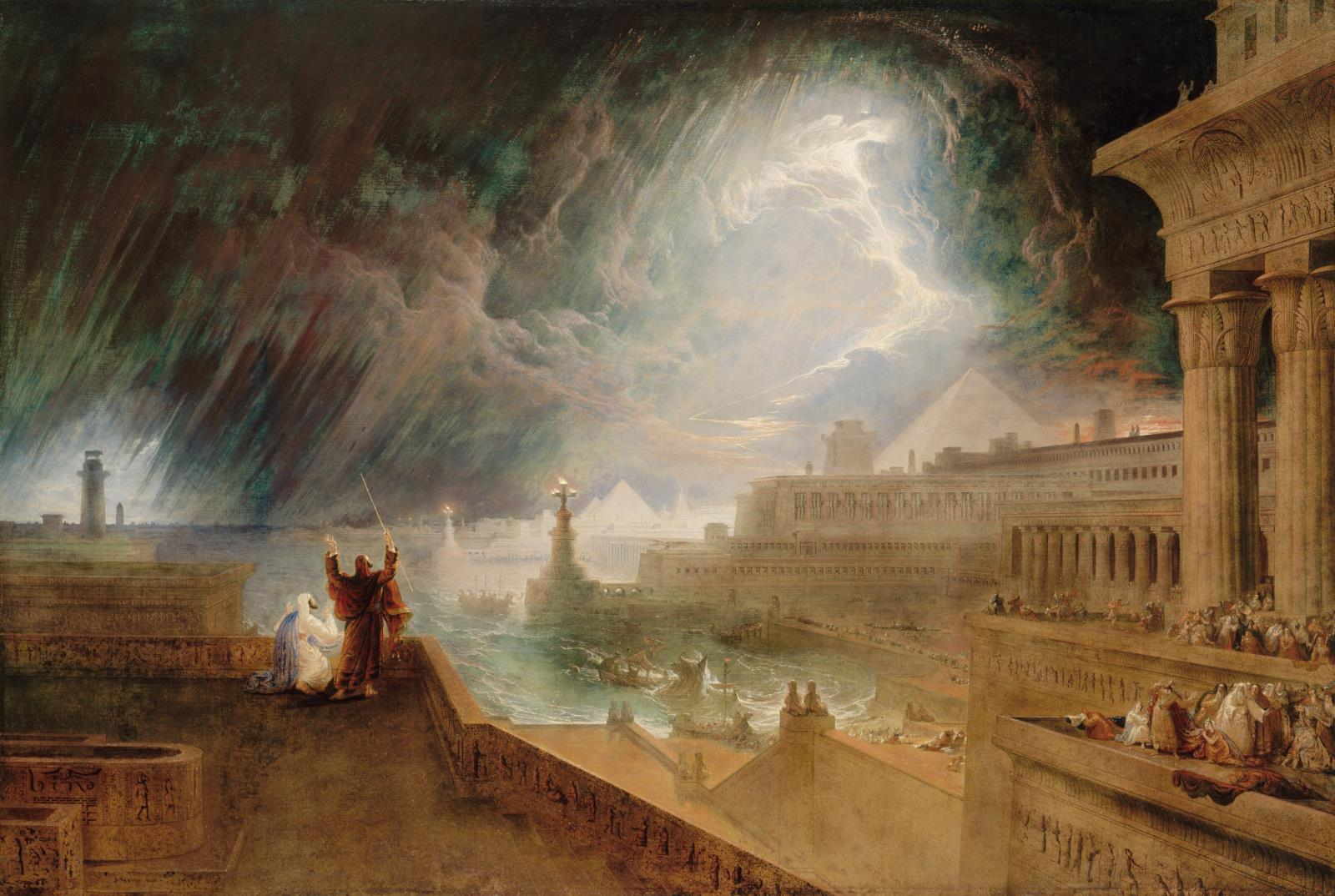
''The Seventh Plague of Egypt (1823 painting by John Martin)

Va'eira, Va'era, or Vaera (וָאֵרָא—Hebrew for "and I appeared," the first word that God speaks in the parashah, in Exodus 6:3) is the fourteenth weekly Torah portion (פָּרָשָׁה, parashah) in the annual Jewish cycle of Torah reading and the second in the Book of Exodus. It constitutes Exodus 6:2–9:35. The parashah tells of the first seven Plagues of Egypt.

Religious Jews read it the fourteenth Shabbat after Simchat Torah—generally in January, or rarely, in late December.

It is composed of 6,701 Hebrew letters, 1,748 Hebrew words, 121 verses, and 222 lines in a Torah scroll, and is part of the Hebrew Bible.

== Readings ==
In traditional Sabbath Torah reading, the "portion" (parashah) is divided into seven readings, or עליות, aliyot. In the Masoretic Text of the Hebrew Bible (Tanakh), Parashat Va'eira has nine "open portion" (פתוחה, petuchah) divisions (roughly equivalent to paragraphs, often abbreviated with the Hebrew letter פ (peh)). Parashat Va'eira has seven further subdivisions, called "closed portion" (סתומה, setumah) divisions (abbreviated with the Hebrew letter ס (samekh)) within the open portion divisions. The first and second open portion divisions divide the first reading. The third open portion covers the balance of the first and part of the second readings. The fourth open portion covers the balance of the second reading. The fifth open portion divides the fourth reading. The sixth open portion covers the balance of the fourth, all of the fifth, and part of the sixth readings. The seventh open portion separates part of the sixth reading. The eighth open portion covers the balance of the sixth and part of the seventh readings. The ninth open portion covers the balance of the seventh reading. Closed portion divisions separate the first and second readings, split the second and third readings, and divide the fourth, fifth, and sixth readings.

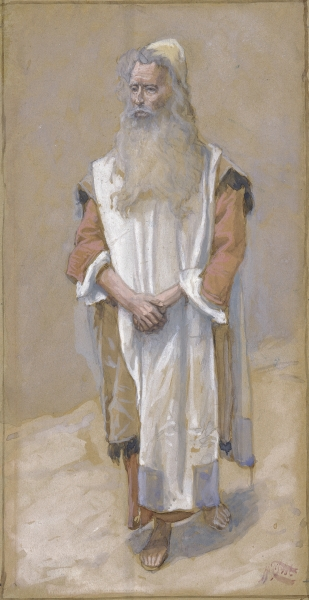
Moses (watercolor circa 1896–1902 by James Tissot)

=== First reading—Exodus 6:2–13 ===
In the first reading, God spoke to Moses, identified God's Self as the God of the Patriarchs, and acknowledged hearing the moaning of the Israelites. God instructed Moses to tell the Israelites that God would free them, make them God's people, and bring them to the Promised Land. But the Israelites would not listen because of their distress and hard labor. The first open portion ends here.

In the continuation of the reading, God told Moses to tell Pharaoh to let the Israelites go, but Moses complained that Pharaoh would not heed him, a man of impeded speech. The second open portion ends here.

In the continuation of the reading, God commanded Moses and Aaron to bring the Israelites out of Egypt. The first reading and a closed portion end here.

=== Second reading—Exodus 6:14–28 ===
The second reading interjects a partial genealogy of Reuben, Simeon, and Levi, including Moses and his family.

Levi
Gershon	Kohath	Merari	Jochebed
Amram	Izhar	Hebron	Uzziel
Miriam	Aaron	Moses

The second reading and a closed portion end with the genealogy.

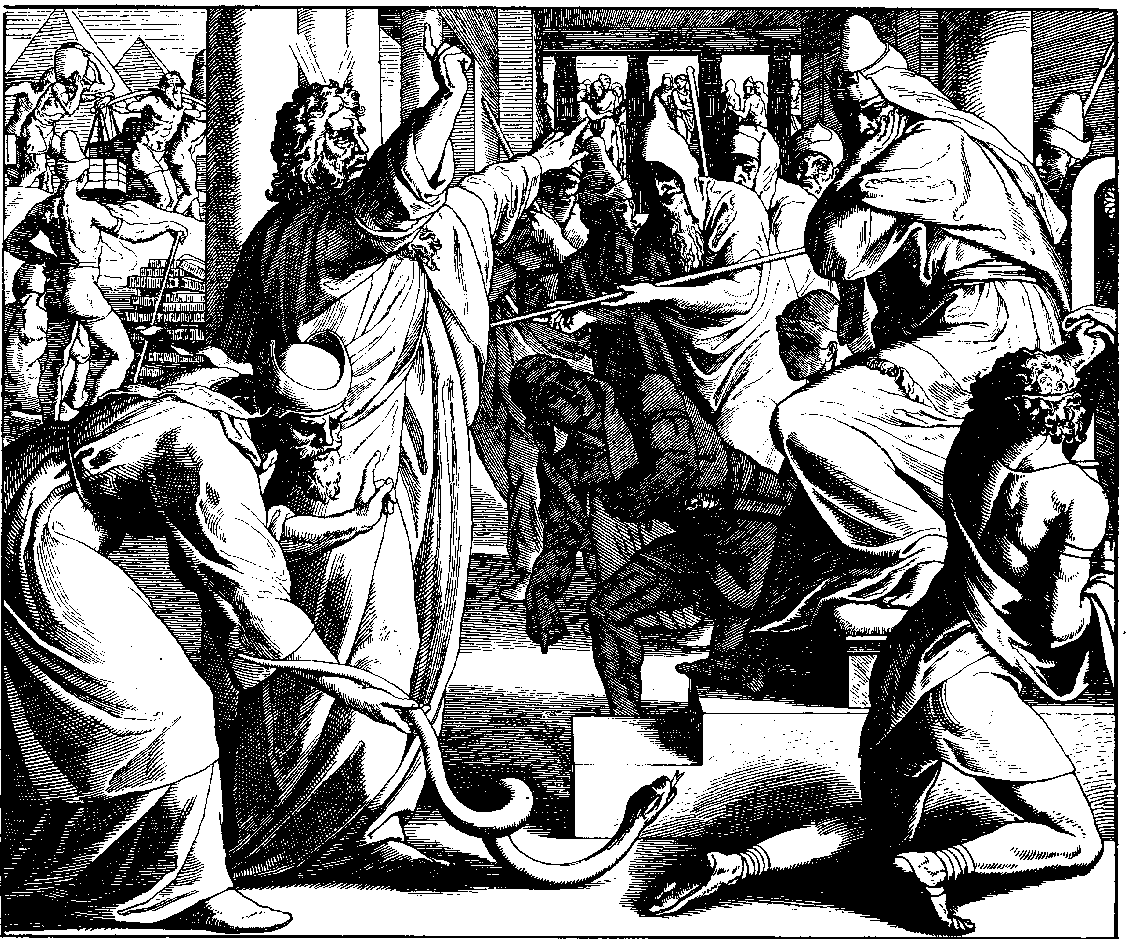
Aaron Cast His Rod Before Pharaoh and It Became a Serpent (woodcut by Julius Schnorr von Carolsfeld from the 1860 Die Bibel in Bildern)

=== Third reading—Exodus 6:29–7:7 ===
In the third reading, God instructed Moses to tell Pharaoh all that God would tell Moses, but Moses protested that he had a speech impediment. The third open portion ends here.

In the continuation of the reading, God placed Aaron in the role of Moses' prophet to speak to Pharaoh. God intended to harden Pharaoh's heart, so that God might show signs and marvels so that the Egyptians would know that the Lord was God. Moses and Aaron did as God commanded. Moses was 80 years old, and Aaron 83 years old, when they spoke to Pharaoh. The third reading and the fourth open portion end here.

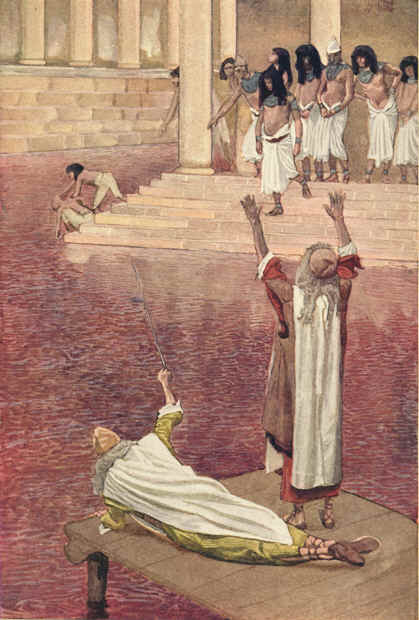
Water Is Changed into Blood (watercolor circa 1896–1902 by James Tissot)

=== Fourth reading—Exodus 7:8–8:6 ===
In the fourth reading, God told how Aaron could cast down his rod, and it would turn into a snake, and Aaron did so before Pharaoh. Pharaoh caused his magicians to do the same, but Aaron's rod swallowed their rods. Pharaoh's heart stiffened. A closed portion ends here.

In the continuation of the reading, God began visiting ten plagues on Egypt. God told Moses to go to Pharaoh at his morning bath, demand that he let the Israelites go to worship in the wilderness, and have Aaron strike the Nile with his rod and turn it into blood. A closed portion ends here.

In the continuation of the reading, God told Moses to tell Aaron to stretch his rod over the waters of Egypt and turn them into blood. Moses and Aaron did so, killing the marine life and rendering the water unusable. But when the Egyptian magicians did the same, Pharaoh's heart stiffened. Seven days passed. The fifth open portion ends here.

As the reading continues, God told Moses to have Aaron hold his arm with the rod over the river and bring up frogs, and they did so. The magicians did the same. Pharaoh summoned Moses and Aaron to plead with God to remove the frogs and said he would let the Israelites go. Moses asked Pharaoh when Moses should ask God. Pharaoh replied the next day, and Moses said that he would do so the next day so that Pharaoh would know that there is none like God. The fourth reading ends here.

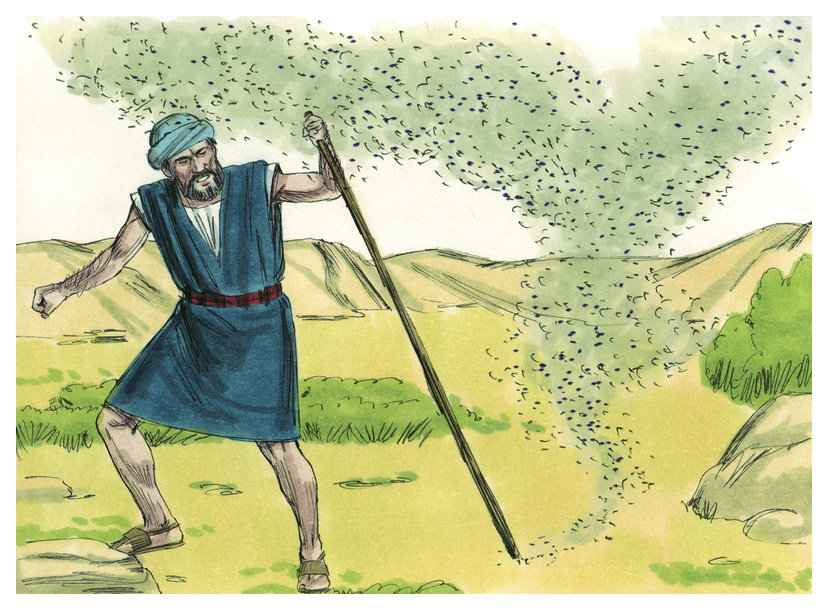
Aaron Struck the Ground with His Staff (1984 illustration by Jim Padgett, courtesy of Distant Shores Media/Sweet Publishing)

=== Fifth reading—Exodus 8:7–18 ===
In the fifth reading, the frogs departed, but Pharaoh became stubborn and did not let the Israelites leave. A closed portion ends here.

In the continuation of the reading, God told Moses to have Aaron strike the dust with his rod, to turn it to lice throughout the land, and they did so. The magicians tried to do the same, but they could not. The magicians told Pharaoh, "This is the finger of God!" But Pharaoh's heart stiffened. A closed portion ends here.

In the continuation of the reading, God told Moses to rise early and stand before Pharaoh as he came to the water and tell him that God said, "Let My people go," or else God would send swarms of insects and wild animals on Egypt, but not on Goshen. The fifth reading ends here.

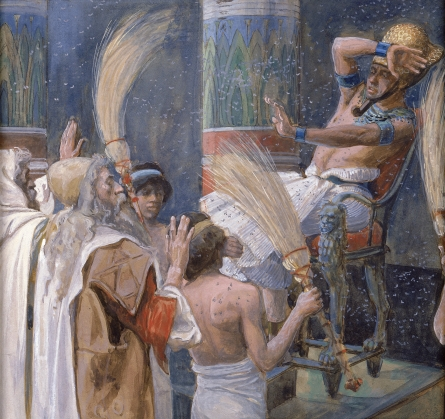
The Plague of Flies (watercolor circa 1896–1902 by James Tissot)

=== Sixth reading—Exodus 8:19–9:16 ===
In the sixth reading, God loosed swarms of insects and wild animals against the Egyptians, but not Goshen, where the Israelites dwelt. Pharaoh told Moses and Aaron to go sacrifice to God within Egypt, but Moses insisted on going three days into the wilderness. Pharaoh agreed, in exchange for Moses' prayer to lift the plague. But when God removed the insects and wild animals, Pharaoh became stubborn again. The sixth open portion ends here with the end of chapter 8.

As the reading continues with chapter 9, God struck the Egyptian's livestock with a pestilence, sparing the Israelites' livestock. But Pharaoh remained stubborn. The seventh open portion ends here.

In the continuation of the reading, God told Moses to take handfuls of soot from the kiln and throw it toward the sky so that it would become fine dust, causing boils on man and beast throughout Egypt, and he did so. But God stiffened Pharaoh's heart. A closed portion ends here.

In the continuation of the reading, God told Moses to rise early and tell Pharaoh that God said, "Let My people go," or this time God would send all God's plagues upon Pharaoh and his people to demonstrate God's power. The sixth reading ends here,

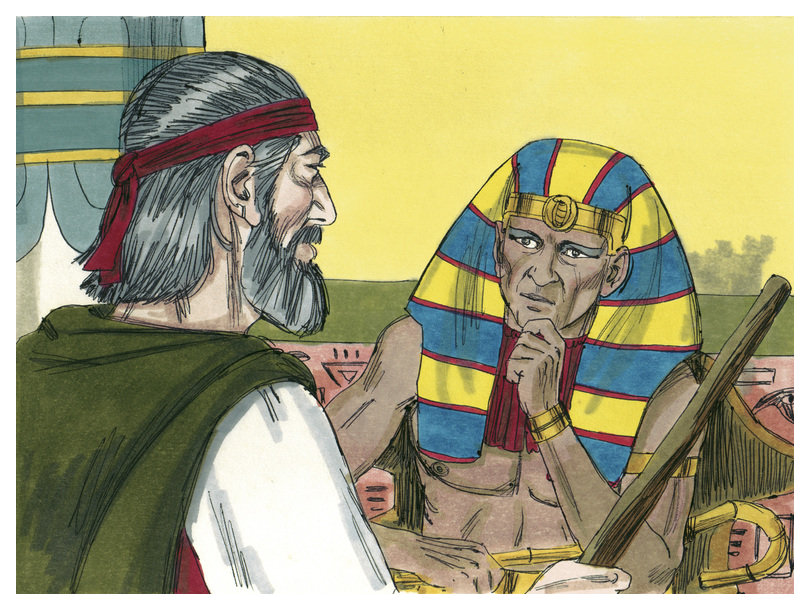
Moses Before Pharaoh (1984 illustration by Jim Padgett, courtesy of Distant Shores Media/Sweet Publishing)

=== Seventh reading—Exodus 9:17–35 ===
In the seventh reading, God instructed Moses to threaten hail such as Egypt had never seen and to teach the Egyptians to bring their cattle in from the field so that they would not die. Those who feared God's word brought their slaves and livestock indoors, and those who did not fear God's word left them in the field. The eighth open portion ends here.

In the continuation of the reading, God told Moses to stretch out his hand, and God sent thunder and hail, which struck down all exposed in Egypt, but did not strike Goshen. Pharaoh confessed his wrong, agreed to let the Israelites go, and asked Moses and Aaron to pray to end the hail. Moses told Pharaoh that he would do so, and the hail would end so that Pharaoh would know that the earth is God's, but Moses knew that Pharaoh and his servants would not yet fear God. The hail had destroyed the flax and the barley, but not the wheat and the spelt, which ripened later.

In the maftir (מפטיר) reading that concludes the parashah, Moses spread forth his hands to God, and the thunders and hail ceased, but when Pharaoh saw, he hardened his heart and did not let the Israelites go. The seventh reading, the ninth open portion, and the parashah end here with the end of chapter 9.

=== Readings according to the triennial cycle ===
Jews who read the Torah according to the triennial cycle of Torah reading read the parashah according to the following schedule:

	Year 1	Year 2	Year 3
	2023, 2026, 2029 . . .	2024, 2027, 2030 . . .	2025, 2028, 2031 . . .
Reading	6:2–7:7	7:8–8:15	8:16–9:35
1	6:2–5	7:8–13	8:16–23
2	6:6–9	7:14–18	8:24–28
3	6:10–13	7:19–25	9:1–7
4	6:14–19	7:26–29	9:8–16
5	6:20–25	8:1–6	9:17–21
6	6:26–28	8:7–11	9:22–26
7	6:29–7:7	8:12–15	9:27–35
Maftir	7:5–7	8:12–15	9:33–35

== In ancient parallels ==
The parashah has parallels in these ancient sources:

=== Exodus chapter 8 ===
Reading the Egyptian magicians' words in Exodus 8:15, "This is the finger of God!" Gunther Plaut reported that in Egyptian literature, a plague is called "the hand of God," while among Babylonians, the expression was the name of a sickness.

== In inner-biblical interpretation ==
The parashah has parallels or is discussed in these Biblical sources:

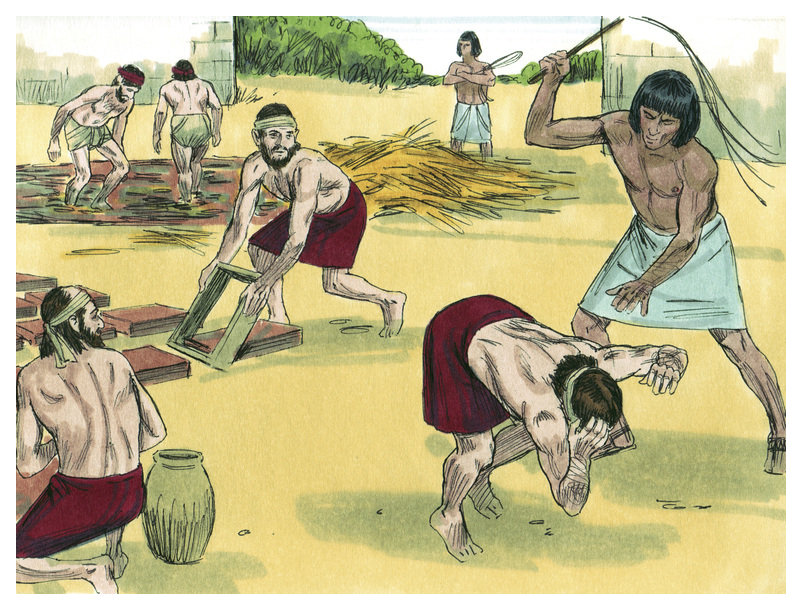
Egyptian Bondage (1984 illustration by Jim Padgett, courtesy of Distant Shores Media/Sweet Publishing)

=== Exodus chapter 6 ===
In Exodus 2:24 and 6:5–6, God remembered God's covenant with Abraham, Isaac, and Jacob to deliver the Israelites from Egyptian bondage. Similarly, God remembered Noah to deliver him from the flood in Genesis 8:1; God promised to remember God's covenant not to destroy the Earth again by flood in Genesis 9:15–16; God remembered Abraham to deliver Lot from the destruction of Sodom and Gomorrah in Genesis 19:29; God remembered Rachel to deliver her from childlessness in Genesis 30:22; Moses called on God to remember God's covenant with Abraham, Isaac, and Jacob to deliver the Israelites from God's wrath after the incident of the Golden Calf in Exodus 32:13 and Deuteronomy 9:27; God promises to "remember" God's covenant with Jacob, Isaac, and Abraham to deliver the Israelites and the Land of Israel in Leviticus 26:42–45; the Israelites were to blow upon their trumpets to be remembered and delivered from their enemies in Numbers 10:9; Samson called on God to deliver him from the Philistines in Judges 16:28; Hannah prayed for God to remember her and deliver her from childlessness in 1 Samuel 1:11 and God remembered Hannah's prayer to deliver her from childlessness in 1 Samuel 1:19; Hezekiah called on God to remember Hezekiah's faithfulness to deliver him from sickness in 2 Kings 20:3 and Isaiah 38:3; Jeremiah called on God to remember God's covenant with the Israelites to not condemn them in Jeremiah 14:21; Jeremiah called on God to remember him and think of him, and avenge him of his persecutors in Jeremiah 15:15; God promises to remember God's covenant with the Israelites and establish an everlasting covenant in Ezekiel 16:60; God remembers the cry of the humble in Zion to avenge them in Psalm 9:13; David called upon God to remember God's compassion and mercy in Psalm 25:6; Asaph called on God to remember God's congregation to deliver them from their enemies in Psalm 74:2; God remembered that the Israelites were only human in Psalm 78:39; Ethan the Ezrahite called on God to remember how short Ethan's life was in Psalm 89:48; God remembers that humans are but dust in Psalm 103:14; God remembers God's covenant with Abraham, Isaac, and Jacob in Psalm 105:8–10; God remembers God's word to Abraham to deliver the Israelites to the Land of Israel in Psalm 105:42–44; the Psalmist calls on God to remember him to favor God's people, to think of him at God's salvation, that he might behold the prosperity of God's people in Psalm 106:4–5; God remembered God's covenant and repented according to God's mercy to deliver the Israelites in the wake of their rebellion and iniquity in Psalm 106:4–5; the Psalmist calls on God to remember God's word to God's servant to give him hope in Psalm 119:49; God remembered us in our low estate to deliver us from our adversaries in Psalm 136:23–24; Job called on God to remember him to deliver him from God's wrath in Job 14:13; Nehemiah prayed to God to remember God's promise to Moses to deliver the Israelites from exile in Nehemiah 1:8; and Nehemiah prayed to God to remember him to deliver him for good in Nehemiah 13:14–31.

Nahum Sarna noted that the first two verbs in Exodus 6:7, “I will take you to Me for a people, and I will be to you a God,” are both used in connection with matrimony—"to take" (לקח, l-k-ch) in Genesis 4:19; 6:2; 11:29, and more than 70 other Biblical occurrences, and "to be (someone's)" (היה ל, h-y-h le-) in Leviticus 21:3; Numbers 30:7; Deuteronomy 24:4; Judges 14:20; 15:2; 2 Samuel 12:10; Jeremiah 3:1; Ezekiel 16:8; and Hosea 3:3. Jeffrey Tigay and Bruce Wells noted that the Hebrew Bible also uses similar language for adoption, for example in 2 Samuel 7:14 (“I will be to him”), and thus one can say that God adopted the Israelites.

=== Exodus chapter 7 ===
As Exodus 7:7 notes that Moses was 80 years old when he spoke to Pharaoh, it would be 40 years later when Moses delivered his speech to the Israelites in Deuteronomy 31:2 and when he died, as reported in Deuteronomy 34:7, at age 120.

=== Exodus chapters 7–12 ===
The description of the 10 plagues exhibits patterns and progressions, as follows:

Cycle	Number	Plague	Verses	Was There Warning?	Time Warned	Introduction	Actor	Rod?	Israelites Shielded?	Did Pharaoh Concede?	Who Hardened Pharaoh's Heart?
First	1	blood	Exodus 7:14–25	yes	in the morning	לֵךְ אֶל-פַּרְעֹה Go to Pharaoh	Aaron	yes	no	no	passive voice
First	2	frogs	Exodus 7:26–8:11 (8:1–15 in the KJV)	yes	unknown	בֹּא אֶל-פַּרְעֹה Go in to Pharaoh	Aaron	yes	no	yes	passive voice
First	3	gnats or lice	Exodus 8:12–15 (8:16–19 in the KJV)	no	none	none	Aaron	yes	no	no	passive voice
Second	4	flies or wild beasts	Exodus 8:16–28 (8:20–32 in the KJV)	yes	early in the morning	וְהִתְיַצֵּב לִפְנֵי פַרְעֹה stand before Pharaoh	God	no	yes	yes	Pharaoh
Second	5	livestock	Exodus 9:1–7	yes	unknown	בֹּא אֶל-פַּרְעֹה Go in to Pharaoh	God	no	yes	no	Pharaoh
Second	6	boils	Exodus 9:8–12	no	none	none	Moses	no	no	no	God
Third	7	hail	Exodus 9:13–35	yes	early in the morning	וְהִתְיַצֵּב לִפְנֵי פַרְעֹה stand before Pharaoh	Moses	no	yes	yes	passive voice
Third	8	locusts	Exodus 10:1–20	yes	unknown	בֹּא אֶל-פַּרְעֹה Go in to Pharaoh	Moses	yes	no	yes	God
Third	9	darkness	Exodus 10:21–29	no	none	none	Moses	yes	yes	yes	God
	10	firstborn	Exodus 11:1–10; 12:29–32;	yes	unknown	none	God	no	yes	yes	God

Psalms 78:44–51 and 105:23–38 each recount differing arrangements of seven plagues. Psalm 78:44–51 recalls plagues of (1) blood, (2) flies, (3) frogs, (4) locusts, (5) hail, (6) livestock, and (7) firstborn, but not plagues of lice, boils, or darkness. Psalm 105:23–38 recalls plagues of (1) darkness, (2) blood, (3) frogs, (4) flies and lice, (5) hail, (6) locusts, and (7) firstborn, but not plagues of livestock or boils.

== In early nonrabbinic interpretation ==
The parashah has parallels or is discussed in these early nonrabbinic sources:

=== Exodus chapter 6 ===
Philo read the words of Exodus 6:3, "I did not make Myself known to them by My name," to teach that no proper name can properly be assigned to God. Philo noted that God told Moses in Exodus 3:14, "I Am that I Am," which Philo equated with, "It is my nature to be, not to be described by name." But in order that human beings not be wholly without anything to call God, God allowed us to use the Name "Lord." God addressed this Name to mortal humans who have need of the Divine Name so that, if they cannot attain the best thing, they may at least know the best possible Name. Philo noted that in Exodus 6:3, God speaks of the proper name of God, never having been revealed to anyone. Philo suggested that God's statement in Exodus 6:3 meant that God had not revealed God's proper Name to them, but only that which could commonly be used. Philo argued that God is so completely indescribable that even those powers ministering to God do not announce God's proper Name to us. And thus after Jacob's wrestling match at the Jabok, Jacob asked the invisible master for a name, but Jacob's opponent did not tell him a proper name, saying that it was sufficient for Jacob to be taught ordinary explanations. But as for names that are the true symbols of things, we are taught not to seek them for the immortal.

== In classical rabbinic interpretation ==
The parashah is discussed in these rabbinic sources from the era of the Mishnah and the Talmud:

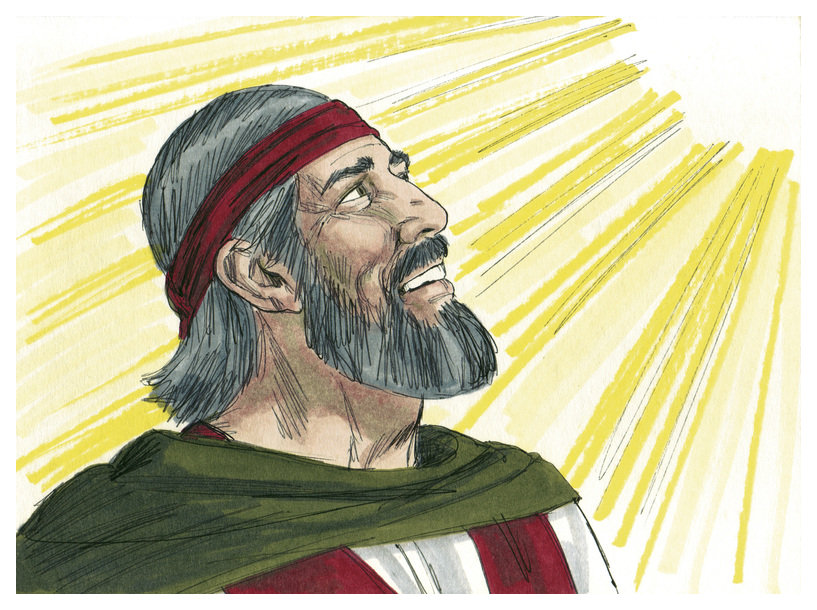
God Answered Moses (1984 illustration by Jim Padgett, courtesy of Distant Shores Media/Sweet Publishing)

=== Exodus chapter 6 ===
A Midrash noted that God had already informed Moses that Pharaoh would not allow the Israelites to go, as in Exodus 3:19, God told Moses, "I know that the King of Egypt will not allow you to go," and in Exodus 4:19, God told Moses, "I will harden his heart." But Moses did not keep this in mind, but came instead to doubt the wisdom of God's decree, and began to argue with God, saying in Exodus 5:22: "Lord, why have You dealt ill with this people?" For this reason, the Attribute of Justice sought to attack Moses, as Exodus 6:2 says: "And God spoke to Moses" (employing the name of God (אֱלֹהִים, Elohim) indicative of God's Justice). But when God reflected that Moses only asked this because of Israel's suffering, God retracted and dealt with Moses according to the Attribute of Mercy, as Exodus 6:2 says: "And He said to him: ‘I am the Lord'" (employing the name of God (יְהוָה, the Tetragrammaton) indicative of God's Mercy). The Midrash viewed the question of Moses in Exodus 5:22 as an application of Ecclesiastes 2:12: "And I turned myself to behold wisdom, and madness and folly; for what can the man do who comes after the King? even that which has been already done." The Midrash taught that Ecclesiastes 2:12 refers to both Solomon and Moses. The Midrash taught that Ecclesiastes 2:12 refers to Solomon, for God gave some commandments for kings, as it says in Deuteronomy 17:16–17: "Only he shall not multiply horses to himself . . . Neither shall he multiply wives to himself, that his heart turn not away; neither silver and gold." Solomon read in Deuteronomy 17:17 that the reason of God's decree was "that his heart turn not away." The Midrash taught that Solomon thus thought to himself that he would multiply his wives but still not allow his heart to turn away. And the Midrash taught that Ecclesiastes 2:12 refers to Moses because Moses began to argue with God in Exodus 5:22, "Lord, why have you dealt ill with this people?" Because of this, the Midrash taught that at that point the wisdom and knowledge of Moses was only (in the words of Ecclesiastes 2:12) "madness and folly." The Midrash asked what right Moses had to question God's ways and in the words of Ecclesiastes 2:12, "that which had been already done" that God had revealed to him.

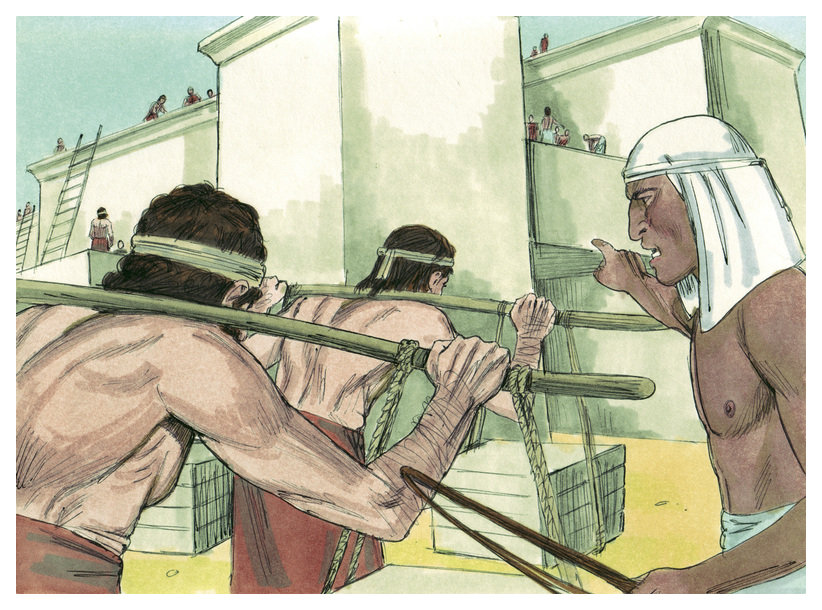
The Egyptians made the Israelites work as slaves. (1984 illustration by Jim Padgett, courtesy of Distant Shores Media/Sweet Publishing)

Reading the words, "And I appeared to Abraham, to Isaac, and to Jacob," in Exodus 6:3, a Midrash taught that God thus told Moses that God longed for those who were gone and could not be replaced—the three Patriarchs. The Midrash said that God told Moses that many times, God had revealed God's Self to Abraham, Isaac, and Jacob as God Almighty (אֵל שַׁדָּי, El Shadai), and God had not made known to them that God's name is the Lord (יְהוָה, the Tetragrammaton). But still they did not criticize God's ways. To Abraham, God said in Genesis 13:17, "Arise, walk through the land in the length of it and in the breadth of it, for to you will I give it," yet when Abraham wanted to bury Sarah, he found no plot of ground until he had purchased one; still, he did not murmur at God's ways. God said to Isaac in Genesis 26:3, "Sojourn in this land . . . for to you, and to your seed, I will give all these lands." Yet when Isaac sought water to drink, he found none; instead (as Genesis 26:20 reports), "The herdsmen of Gerar strove with Isaac's herdsmen, saying: ‘The water is ours.'" Still Isaac did not murmur at God's ways. God said to Jacob in Genesis 28:13, "The land on which you lie, to you will I give it, and to your seed." Yet when he sought a place to pitch his tent, he found none until he purchased one for a hundred kesitah (as reported in Genesis 33:19). And still Jacob did not complain at God's ways. The Patriarchs did not ask God, as Moses did in Exodus 3:13, what God's name was. In contrast, at the commencement of God's commission of Moses, Moses inquired of God's name. And in Exodus 5:23, Moses told God, "For since I came to Pharaoh . . . he has dealt ill with this people; neither have You delivered Your people." On this account, the Midrash taught, God said in Exodus 6:4, "And I have also established my covenant with them," the Patriarchs, to give them the land, and they never complained of God's ways. And God said in Exodus 6:5, "I have heard the groaning of the children of Israel," because they did not complain against God. Although the Israelites of that generation did not conduct themselves righteously, yet God heard their cry on account of the covenant that God had made with the Patriarchs. Hence, it says in Exodus 6:6, "And I have remembered My covenant. Therefore, say to the children of Israel." The Midrash taught that the word "therefore" (lachein) in Exodus 6:6 implies an oath, as it does in 1 Samuel 3:14, where God says, "And therefore I have sworn to the house of Eli." Thus, the Midrash taught that God swore to Moses that God would redeem the Israelites, so that Moses would have no reason to fear that the Attribute of Justice would retard their redemption.

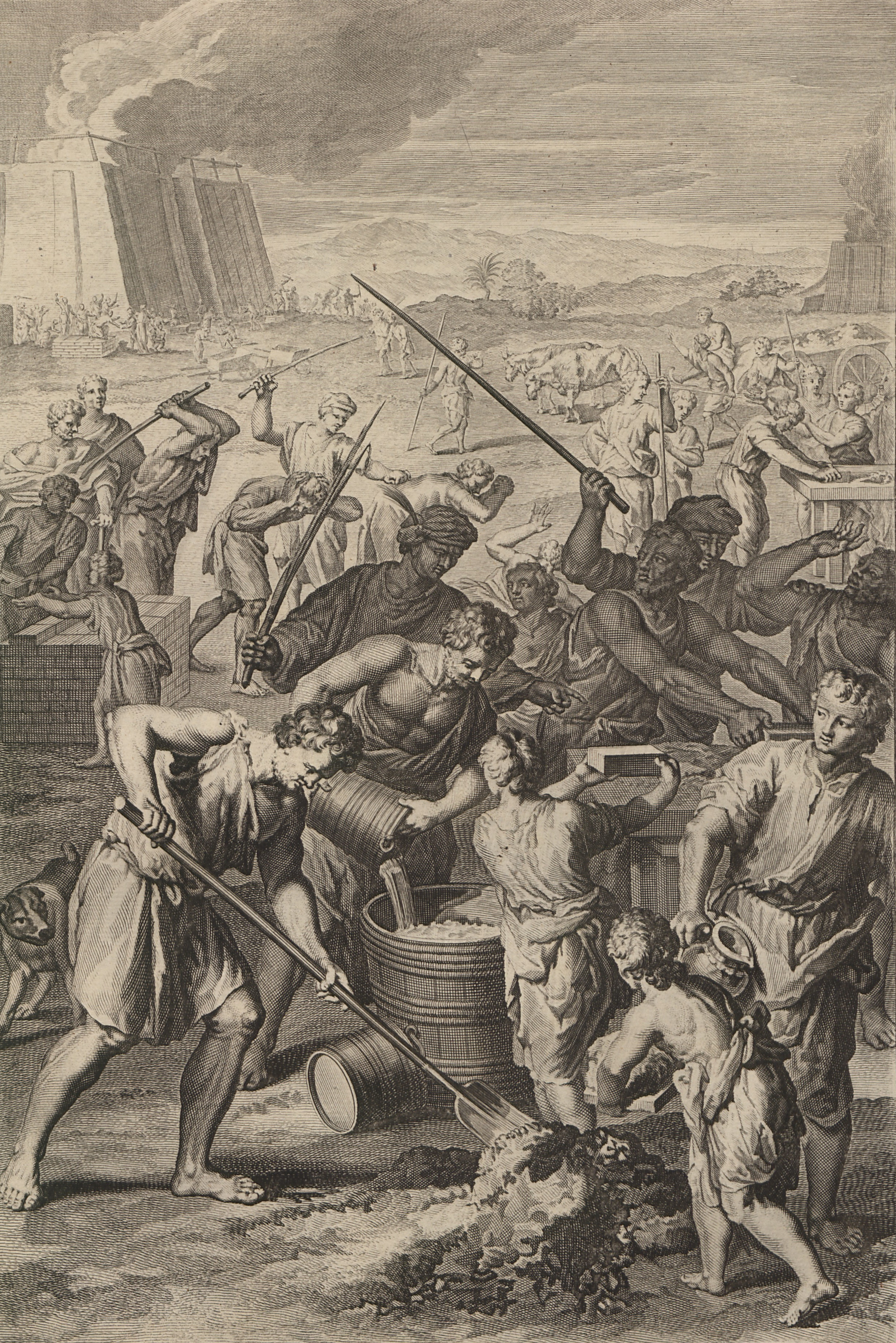
The Israelites' Cruel Bondage in Egypt (illustration from the 1728 Figures de la Bible)

Rabbi Simai found evidence for the resurrection of the dead in the words, "And I also have established my covenant with them (the Patriarchs) to give them the land of Canaan," in Exodus 6:4. Rabbi Simai noted that Exodus 6:4 does not say "to give you" but "to give them," implying that God would give the land to the Patriarchs personally, and thus that God would resurrect them so as to fulfill the promise.

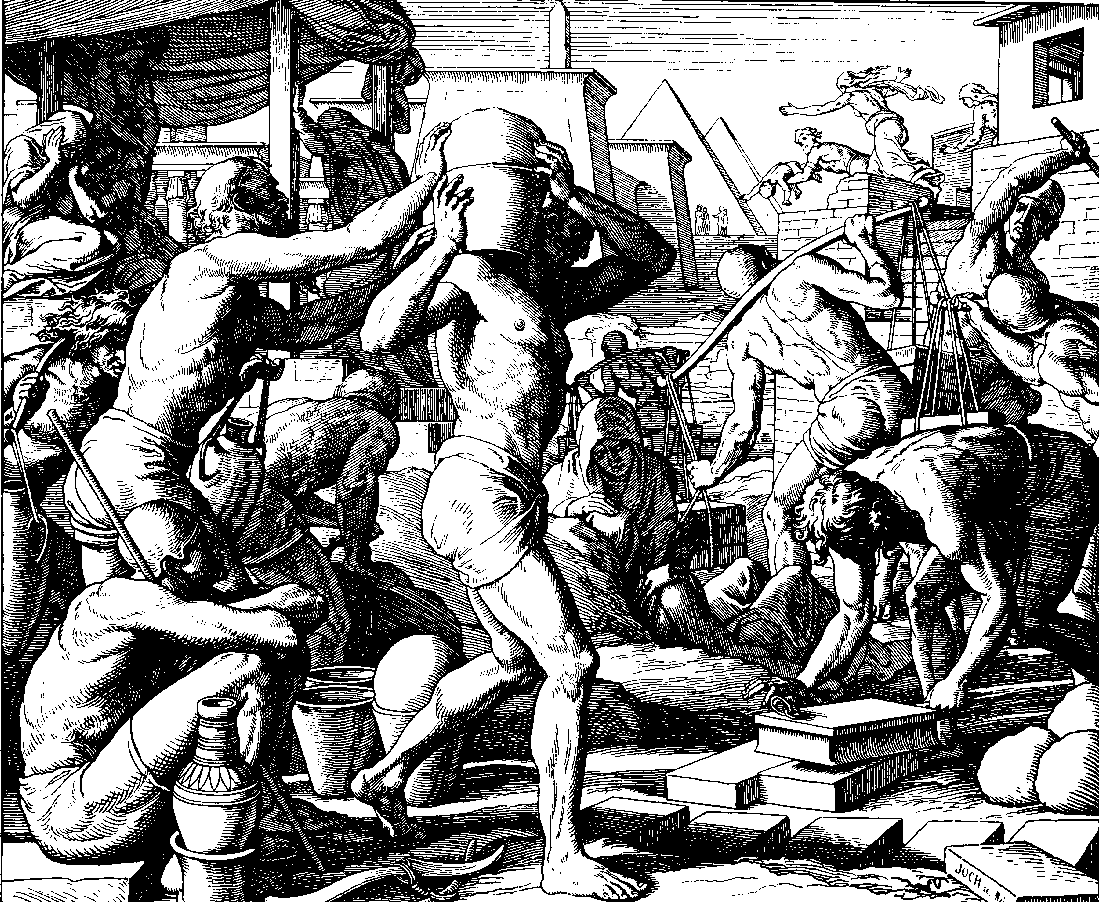
The Egyptians Afflicted the Israelites with Burdens (woodcut by Julius Schnorr von Carolsfeld from the 1860 Die Bibel in Bildern)

A Baraita deduced from Exodus 6:6 that the Israelites' bondage in Egypt ended on Rosh Hashanah. The Baraita noted that Exodus 6:6 uses the word "burden" to describe the end of the Israelites' bondage in Egypt, and Psalm 81:7 uses the word "burden" to describe the end of Joseph's imprisonment, and the Baraita deduced that the two events must therefore have occurred at the same time of year. The Baraita further deduced from the words, "Blow the horn on the new moon, on the covering day for our festival . . . He appointed it for Joseph for a testimony when he went forth," in Psalm 81:4–6 that Joseph went forth from the prison on Rosh Hashanah.

Rabbi Nehemiah cited the use of the words "will bring you out" in Exodus 6:6 to demonstrate that using the word hamotzi in the blessing over bread would mean that God "will bring forth" bread from the land—not that God "has brought forth" bread from the land. Rabbi Nehemiah thus read Exodus 6:6–7 to mean: "I am the Lord, the One Who will bring you out from under the burdens of the Egyptians." The Gemara reported that the Rabbis of a Baraita, however, read Exodus 6:6–7 to mean: "When I shall bring you out, I will do for you something that will show you that I am the One Who brought you out from under the burdens of the Egyptians."

The Jerusalem Talmud cited the four promises of salvation in Exodus 6:6–7, (1) "I will bring you out from under the burdens of the Egyptians," (2) "I will deliver you from their bondage," (3) "I will redeem you with an outstretched arm," and (4) "I will take you to Me for a people," as one reason why Jews drink four cups of wine at the Passover seder. And thus the Mishnah taught that "On the eve of Passover, . . . even the poorest man in Israel must not eat until he reclines; and they (the overseers of charity) should give him not less than four cups of wine."

A Baraita taught that Rabbi Simai deduced from the similarity of the phrases "And I will take you to me for a people" and "And I will bring you in to the land" in Exodus 6:7 that the Israelites' Exodus from Egypt occurred under circumstances like their entry into the Land of Israel. Rabbi Simai thus deduced that just as only two out of 600,000 (Caleb and Joshua) entered the Promised Land, so only two out of every 600,000 Israelites in Egypt participated in the Exodus, and the rest died in Egypt. Rava taught that it will also be so when the Messiah comes that only a small portion of Jews will find redemption, for Hosea 2:17 says, "And she shall sing there, as in the days of her youth, and as in the days when she came up out of the land of Egypt," implying that circumstances upon the coming of the Messiah will be similar to those upon the Israelites' entry into the Land of Israel.

The Gemara asked why the Tannaim felt that the allocation of the Land of Israel "according to the names of the tribes of their fathers" in Numbers 26:55 meant that the allocation was with reference to those who left Egypt; perhaps, the Gemara supposed, it might have meant the 12 tribes and that the Land was to be divided into 12 equal portions? The Gemara noted that in Exodus 6:8, God told Moses to tell the Israelites who were about to leave Egypt, "And I will give it you for a heritage; I am the Lord," and that meant that the Land was the inheritance from the fathers of those who left Egypt.

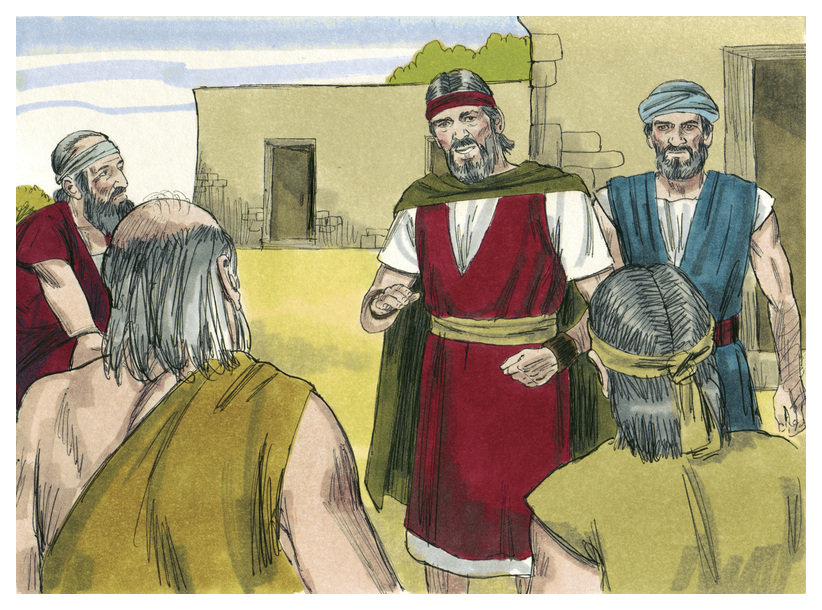
Moses told the people what God had said. (1984 illustration by Jim Padgett, courtesy of Distant Shores Media/Sweet Publishing)

A Midrash interpreted the words of Exodus 6:9, "they hearkened not to Moses for shortness of spirit," to indicated that it was difficult for the Israelites to abandon idol worship.

Rabbi Ishmael cited Exodus 6:12 as one of ten a fortiori (kal va-chomer) arguments recorded in the Hebrew Bible: (1) In Genesis 44:8, Joseph's brothers told Joseph, "Behold, the money that we found in our sacks' mouths we brought back to you," and they thus reasoned, "how then should we steal?" (2) In Exodus 6:12, Moses told God, "Behold, the children of Israel have not hearkened to me," and reasoned that surely even more, "How then shall Pharaoh hear me?" (3) In Deuteronomy 31:27, Moses said to the Israelites, "Behold, while I am yet alive with you this day, you have been rebellious against the Lord," and reasoned that it would follow, "And how much more after my death?" (4) In Numbers 12:14, "the Lord said to Moses: ‘If her (Miriam's) father had but spit in her face,'" surely it would stand to reason, "‘Should she not hide in shame seven days?'" (5) In Jeremiah 12:5, the prophet asked, "If you have run with the footmen, and they have wearied you," is it not logical to conclude, "Then how can you contend with horses?" (6) In 1 Samuel 23:3, David's men said to him, "Behold, we are afraid here in Judah," and thus surely it stands to reason, "How much more then if we go to Keilah?" (7) Also in Jeremiah 12:5, the prophet asked, "And if in a land of Peace where you are secure" you are overcome, is it not logical to ask, "How will you do in the thickets of the Jordan?" (8) Proverbs 11:31 reasoned, "Behold, the righteous shall be requited in the earth," and does it not follow, "How much more the wicked and the sinner?" (9) In Esther 9:12, "The king said to Esther the queen: ‘The Jews have slain and destroyed 500 men in Shushan the castle,'" and it thus stands to reason, "‘What then have they done in the rest of the king's provinces?'" (10) In Ezekiel 15:5, God came to the prophet saying, "Behold, when it was whole, it was usable for no work," and thus surely it is logical to argue, "How much less, when the fire has devoured it, and it is singed?"

Rav Zeira counted five kinds of orlah (things uncircumcised) in the world: (1) uncircumcised ears (as in Jeremiah 6:10), (2) uncircumcised lips (as in Exodus 6:12), (3) uncircumcised hearts (as in Deuteronomy 10:16 and Jeremiah 9:26), (4) uncircumcised flesh (as in Genesis 17:14), and (5) uncircumcised trees (as in Leviticus 19:23). Rav Zeira taught that all the nations are uncircumcised in each of the first four ways, and all the house of Israel are uncircumcised in heart, in that their hearts do not allow them to do God's will. And Rav Zeira taught that in the future, God will take away from Israel the uncircumcision of their hearts, and they will not harden their stubborn hearts anymore before their Creator, as Ezekiel 36:26 says, "And I will take away the stony heart out of your flesh, and I will give you an heart of flesh," and Genesis 17:11 says, "And you shall be circumcised in the flesh of your foreskin."

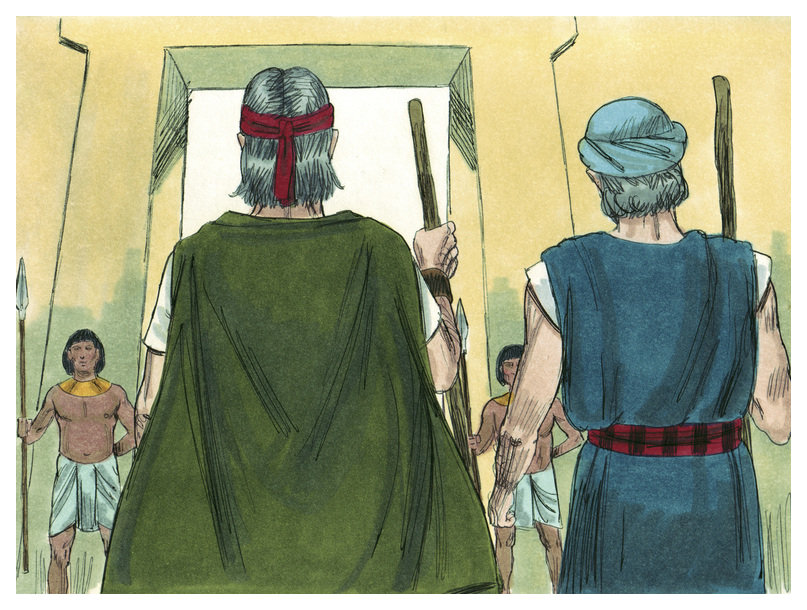
The Lord told Moses to go before Pharaoh again. (1984 illustration by Jim Padgett, courtesy of Distant Shores Media/Sweet Publishing)

Reading Exodus 6:13, 7:8, and 9:8, a Midrash taught that in 18 verses, Scripture places Moses and Aaron (the instruments of Israel's deliverance) on an equal footing (reporting that God spoke to both of them alike), and thus there are 18 benedictions in the Amidah.

Reading the words of Exodus 6:13, "And the Lord spoke to Moses and to Aaron and gave them a command concerning the children of Israel," Rabbi Samuel bar Rabbi Isaac asked about what matter God commanded the Israelites. Rabbi Samuel bar Rabbi Isaac taught that God gave them the commandment about the freeing of slaves in Exodus 21:2–11.

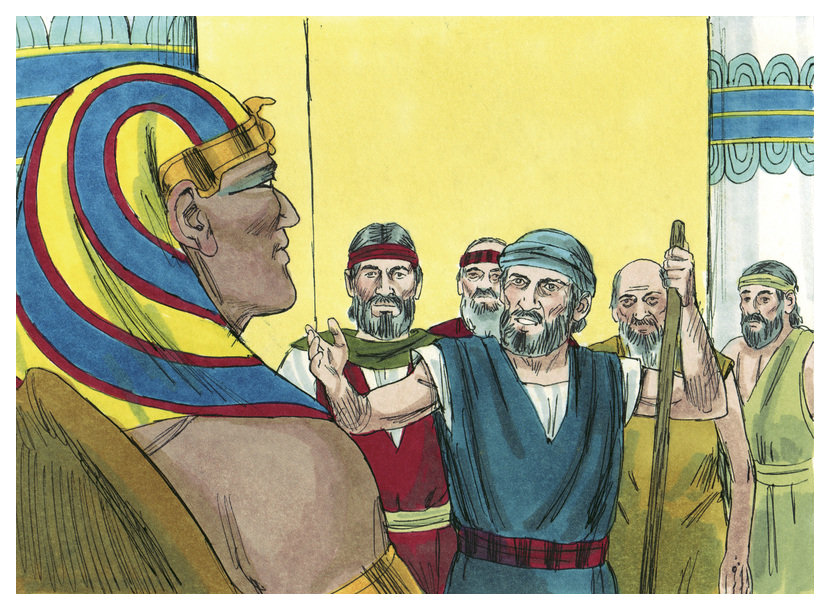
Moses and Aaron went before Pharaoh. (1984 illustration by Jim Padgett, courtesy of Distant Shores Media/Sweet Publishing)

A Midrash interpreted the words of Exodus 6:13, "And He gave them a charge concerning the children of Israel," to convey that God warned Moses and Aaron that the Israelites were obstinate, bad-tempered, and troublesome, and that in assuming leadership over the Israelites, Moses and Aaron must expect that the Israelites would curse and even stone them.

A Midrash interpreted God's instructions to Moses and Aaron in Exodus 6:13, "and to Pharaoh, King of Egypt," to convey that God told Moses and Aaron that although God really ought to punish Pharaoh, God wanted Moses and Aaron to show Pharaoh the respect due to his regal position. And Moses did so, as Exodus 11:8 reports that Moses told Pharaoh that God said, "And all these your servants shall come down to Me." Moses did not say that Pharaoh would come down, only that Pharaoh's servants would do so. But Moses could well have said that Pharaoh himself would come down, for Exodus 12:30 reports, "Pharaoh arose at midnight." But Moses did not mention Pharaoh specifically so as to pay him respect.

Levi
Kohath
Amram	Izhar	Hebron	Uzziel
Miriam	Aaron	Moses	Korah	Nepheg	Zichri	Mishael	Elzaphan	Sithri

A Midrash taught that Korah took issue with Moses in Numbers 16:1 because Moses had (as Numbers 3:30 reports) appointed Elizaphan the son of Uzziel as prince of the Kohathites, and Korah was (as Exodus 6:21 reports) son of Uzziel's older brother Izhar, and thus had a claim to leadership prior to Elizaphan.

Rava taught that he who wishes to take a wife should first inquire about the character of her brothers. For Exodus 6:23 reports, "And Aaron took Elisheva, the daughter of Amminadab, the sister of Nahshon." As Exodus 6:23 states "the daughter of Amminadab," it is obvious that she was the sister of Nahshon. So Exodus 6:23 expressly states "the sister of Nahshon" to imply that he who takes a wife should inquire about the character of her brothers, because most children resemble the brothers of their mother.

The Gemara asked whether the words in Exodus 6:25, "And Eleazar Aaron's son took him one of the daughters of Putiel to wife" did not convey that Eleazar's son Phinehas descended from Jethro, who fattened (piteim) calves for idol worship. The Gemara then provided an alternative explanation: Exodus 6:25 could mean that Phinehas descended from Joseph, who conquered (pitpeit) his passions (resisting Potiphar's wife, as reported in Genesis 39). But the Gemara asked, did not the tribes sneer at Phinehas and question how a youth (Phinehas) whose mother's father crammed calves for idol-worship could kill the head of a tribe in Israel (Zimri, Prince of Simeon, as reported in Numbers 25). The Gemara explained that the real explanation was that Phinehas descended from both Joseph and Jethro. If Phinehas's mother's father descended from Joseph, then Phinehas's mother's mother descended from Jethro. And if Phinehas's mother's father descended from Jethro, then Phinehas's mother's mother descended from Joseph. The Gemara explained that Exodus 6:25 implies this dual explanation of "Putiel" when it says, "of the daughters of Putiel," because the plural "daughters" implies two lines of ancestry (from both Joseph and Jethro).

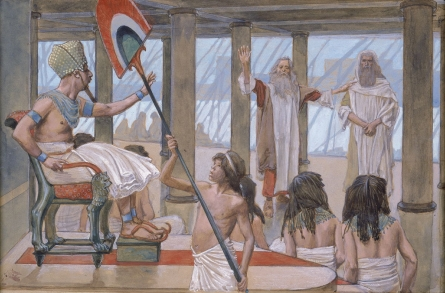
Moses Speaks to Pharaoh (watercolor circa 1896–1902 by James Tissot)

Rabbi Simeon noted that in nearly every instance, the Torah mentioned Moses before Aaron, but Exodus 6:26 mentioned Aaron before Moses, teaching that the two were deemed equivalent. The Gemara taught that the use of the pronoun "he (hu)" in an introduction, as in the words "These are (hu) that Aaron and Moses" in Exodus 6:26 signifies that they were the same in their righteousness from the beginning to the end. Similar uses appear in Chronicles 1:27 to teach Abraham's enduring righteousness, in 1 Samuel 17:14 to teach David's enduring humility, in Genesis 36:43 to teach Esau's enduring wickedness, in Numbers 26:9 to teach Dathan and Abiram's enduring wickedness, in 2 Chronicles 28:22 to teach Ahaz's enduring wickedness, and in Esther 1:1 to teach Ahasuerus's enduring wickedness.

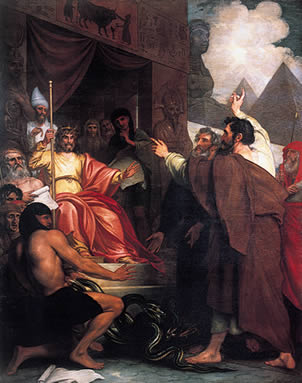
Moses and Aaron before Pharaoh (painting by Benjamin West)

=== Exodus chapter 7 ===
The Tosefta cited Exodus 7:1, where the lesser Aaron spoke for the greater Moses, for the proposition that in synagogue reading, a minor may translate for an adult, but it is not honorable for an adult to translate for a minor.

Rabbi Phinehas, the priest, son of Rabbi Hama, interpreted God's hardening of Pharaoh's heart (for example in Exodus 7:3) in light of Job 36:13, "But they who are godless in heart lay up anger; they cry not for help when He binds them." Rabbi Phinehas taught that if the godless, for whose repentance God waits, do not do so, then later, even when they do think of it, God distracts their hearts from penitence. Rabbi Phinehas interpreted the words of Job 36:13, "And they who are godless in heart," to teach that those who begin by being godless in heart end up bringing upon themselves God's anger. And Rabbi Phinehas interpreted the words of Job 36:13, "They cry not for help when He binds them," to teach that though the godless wish later to return to God and to pray to God, they are no longer able, because God binds them and bars their way. Thus, after several plagues, Pharaoh wished to pray to God, but God told Moses in Exodus 8:16: "Before he goes out [to pray to God], stand before Pharaoh."

The Pirke De-Rabbi Eliezer told that Moses quoted God's words in Exodus 7:4 back to God after the sin of the Golden Calf. The Pirke De-Rabbi Eliezer told that after the incident of the Golden Calf, God told Moses that the Israelites had forgotten God's might and had made an idol. Moses replied to God that while the Israelites had not yet sinned, God had called them "My people," as in Exodus 7:4, God had said, "And I will bring forth My hosts, My people." But Moses noted that once the Israelites had sinned, God told Moses (in Exodus 32:7), "Go, get down, for your people have corrupted themselves." Moses told God that the Israelites were indeed God's people, and God's inheritance, as Deuteronomy 9:29 reports Moses saying, "Yet they are Your people and Your inheritance."

A Midrash read Exodus 7:11, “Then Pharaoh also called for the wise men and the sorcerers,” to teach that Scripture calls nonbelievers “wise men” when they do something that requires skill.

Rabbi Aivu bar Nagri said in the name of Rabbi Hiyya bar Abba that the words "with their enchantments" in Exodus 7:11 refer to sorcery without exogenous assistance, while the words "with their sorcery" in Exodus 7:22 refer to magic through the agency of demons.

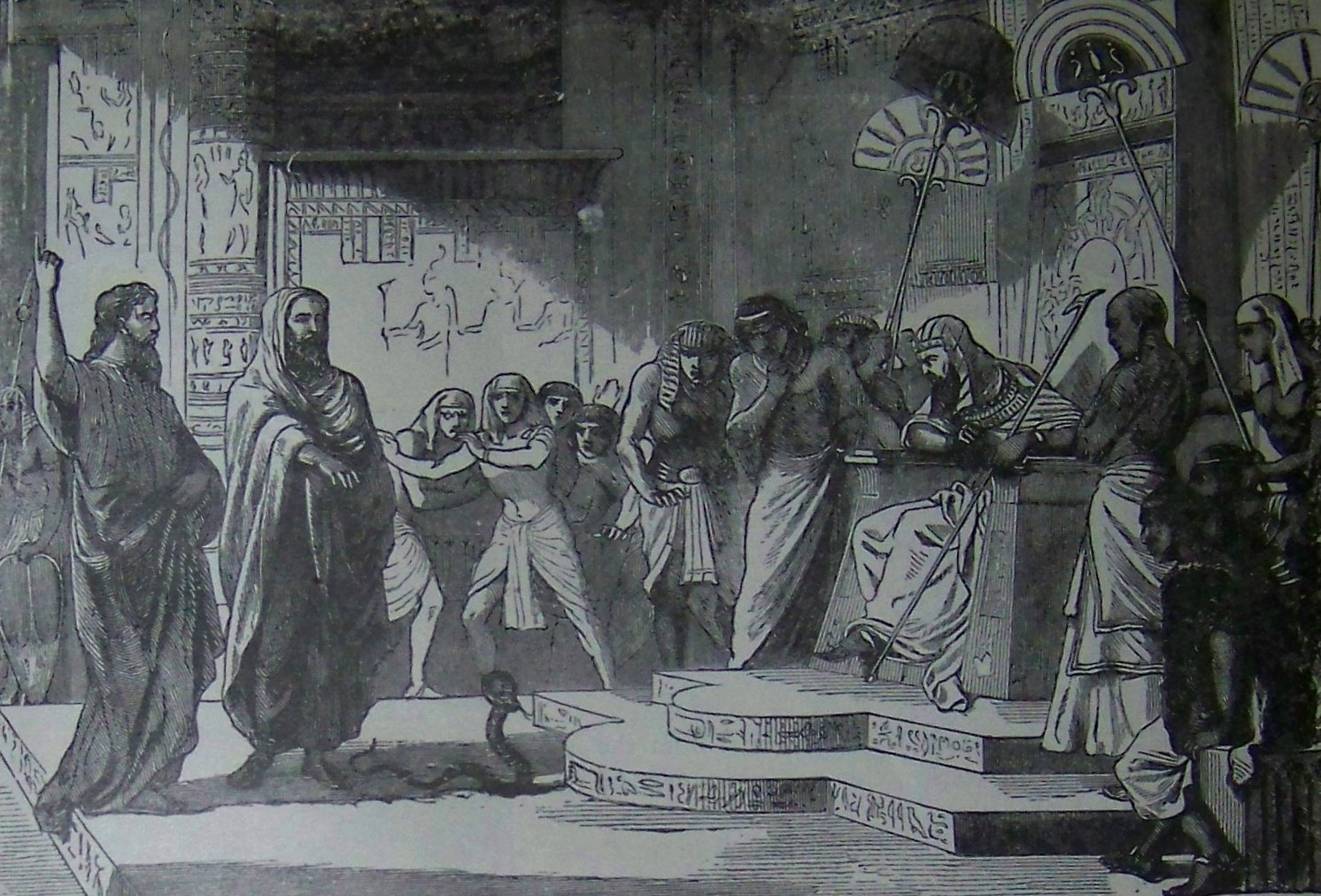
Aaron's Rod Changed to a Serpent (illustration from the 1890 Holman Bible)

Reading the words, "Aaron's rod swallowed up their rods," in Exodus 7:12, Rabbi Eleazar observed that it was a double miracle (as Aaron's serpent first became a rod again, and as a rod it swallowed up their serpents). When Pharaoh saw this, he was amazed and expressed his fear of what would happen if Moses now told the rod to swallow up Pharaoh and his throne. Rabbi Jose bar Hanina taught that a great miracle happened to that rod, for although it swallowed up all the rods that had been cast down, sufficient to make ten heaps, still the rod did not all become any thicker, and all who saw it recognized it as Aaron's rod. On this account, Aaron's rod became a symbol for all the miracles and wonders that were to be performed for Israel throughout the generations.

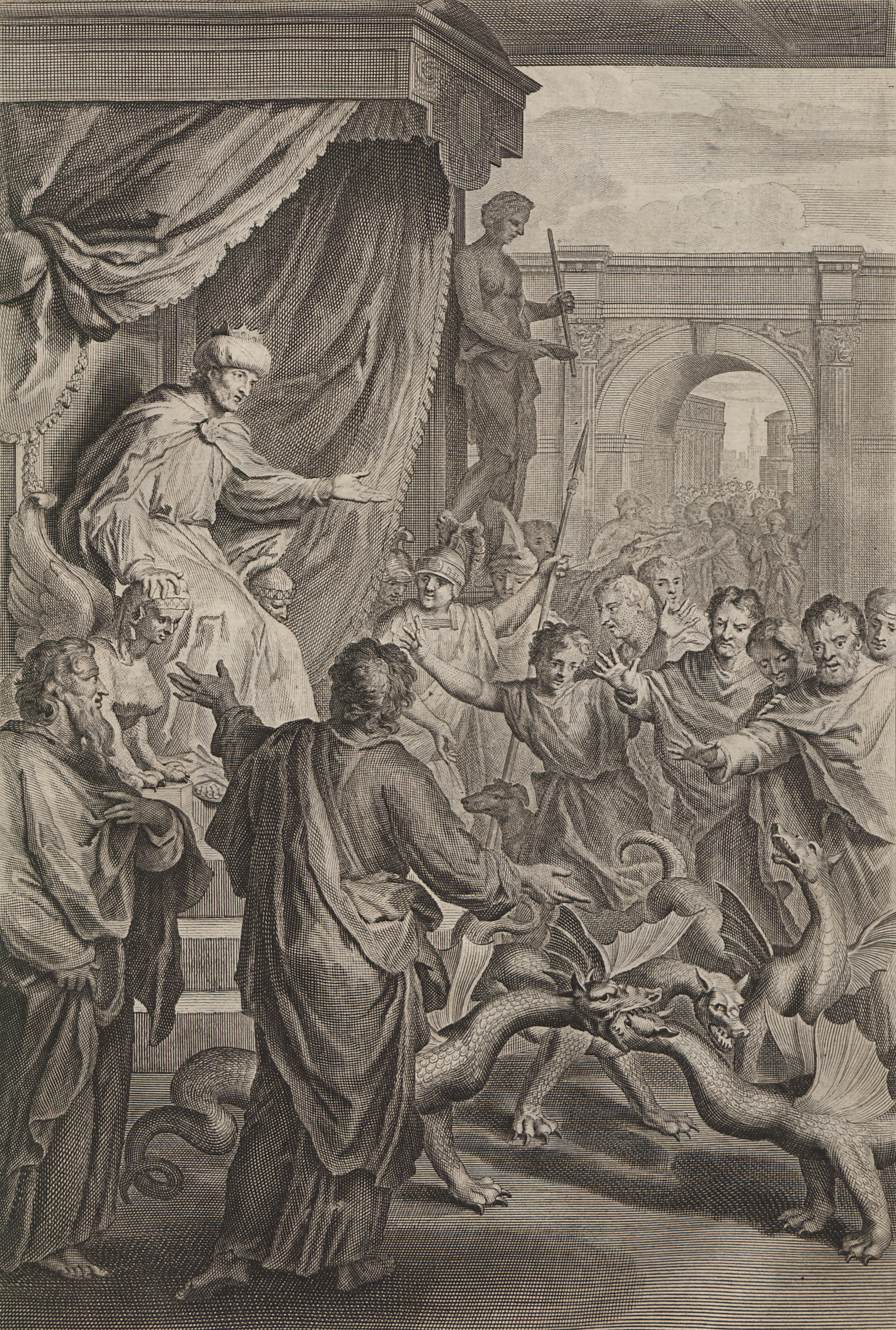
The Rods of Moses and the Magicians Turned into Serpents (illustration from the 1728 Figures de la Bible)

A Midrash noted that Exodus 7:13 reports that "Pharaoh's heart was hardened" without God's action, and that this was so for the first five plagues. As the first five plagues did not move Pharaoh to release the Israelites, God decreed that from then on, even if Pharaoh had agreed to release the Israelites, God would not accept it. Thus, starting with the sixth plague and thereafter (as Exodus 10:27 reports), the text says, "the Lord hardened Pharaoh's heart."

It was taught in a Baraita that Rabbi Judah the Prince (or others say Rabbi Meir) used to say that Providence repays a person measure for measure. Thus, a Midrash taught that God sent the plagues against Pharaoh measure for measure. God changed the Egyptians' water into blood because the Egyptians prevented the Israelites from using the ritual bath (mikveh) so as to prevent the Israelite women from having marital relations with their husbands. God brought frogs because the Egyptians had ordered the Israelites to bring them reptiles and creeping creatures (which were an abomination to the Israelites). God sent lice because the Egyptians had made the Israelites clean the dirty streets and marketplaces. God sent swarms of wild animals because the Egyptians had demanded that the Israelites catch bears, lions, and leopards so as to separate the Israelite men from their wives. God brought the pestilence upon the Egyptians' cattle because they had forced the Israelites to serve as shepherds so as to keep the Israelite men away from their wives. God sent boils because the Egyptians had demanded that the Israelites warm things for them. God sent hail to destroy the Egyptians' crops because the Egyptians had sent the Israelites into the fields to plow and sow. God brought the locusts to destroy the Egyptians' grain because the Egyptians had forced the Israelites to plant wheat and barley for them. God brought darkness because among the Israelites were transgressors who had Egyptian patrons and lived in affluence and honor in Egypt and did not want to leave Egypt, and so God brought darkness so that God could kill these transgressors without the Egyptians' seeing.

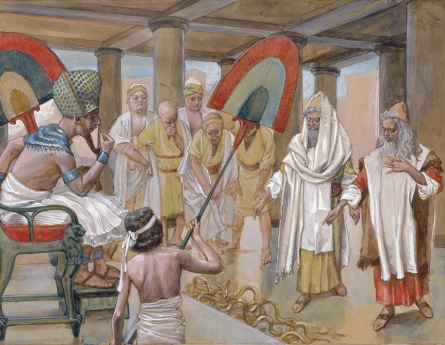
The Rod of Aaron Devours the Other Rods (watercolor circa 1896–1902 by James Tissot)

Abitol the barber, citing Rav, said that the Pharaoh whom Moses addressed was a puny fellow, a cubit tall, with a beard as long as he was tall, embodying the words in Daniel 4:14 that "the Most High rules in the kingdom of men, and . . . sets up over it the lowest of men." And Abitol the barber, citing Rav, deduced from the words "Pharaoh . . . goes out to the water" in Exodus 7:15 that this Pharaoh was a magus who went to the water to perform sorcery.

Alternatively, a Midrash, reading the words "Pharaoh . . . goes out to the water" in Exodus 7:15, taught that only in the morning did Pharaoh go out to the water, because Pharaoh used to boast that he was a god and did not need to relieve himself. Therefore, Pharaoh used to go early in the morning to the water (when no one else was there to witness that he relieved himself like other humans). God, therefore, told Moses to catch him just at this critical moment.

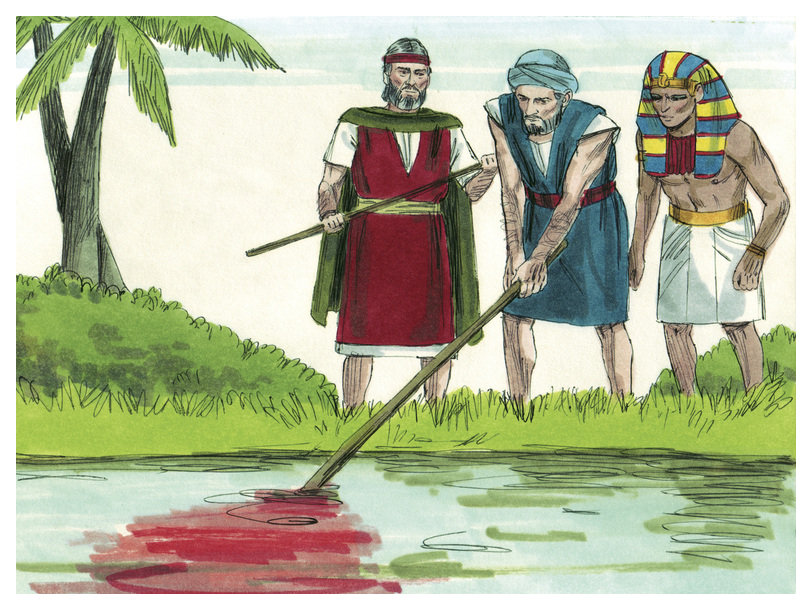
All the water turned into blood! (1984 illustration by Jim Padgett, courtesy of Distant Shores Media/Sweet Publishing)

A Midrash cited Exodus 7:20 as one proof for the proposition that God does all things together: God puts to death and brings to life at the same time; God wounds and heals at the same time. And thus the Midrash noted, in Exodus 7:20, "all the waters that were in the river were turned to blood," and later, the blood became water again.

Rabbi Abin the Levite, the son of Rabbi Judah the Prince, taught that the Israelites became wealthy from the plague of blood. If an Egyptian and an Israelite were in a house where there was a barrel full of water, and the Egyptian went to fill a pitcher from the barrel, the Egyptian would find that it contained blood, while the Israelite would drink water from the same barrel. When the Egyptian asked the Israelite to give the Egyptian some water with the Israelite's own hand, it still became blood. Even if the Egyptian said to the Israelite that they should both drink from one vessel, the Israelite would drink water, but the Egyptian would drink blood. It was only when the Egyptian bought water from the Israelite for money that the Egyptian was able to drink water. And this is how the Israelites became rich.

The Gemara deduced from the use of the word for fish, dagah, in the phrase "And the fish that were in the river died" in Exodus 7:21 that the word dagah applies to fish both large and small.

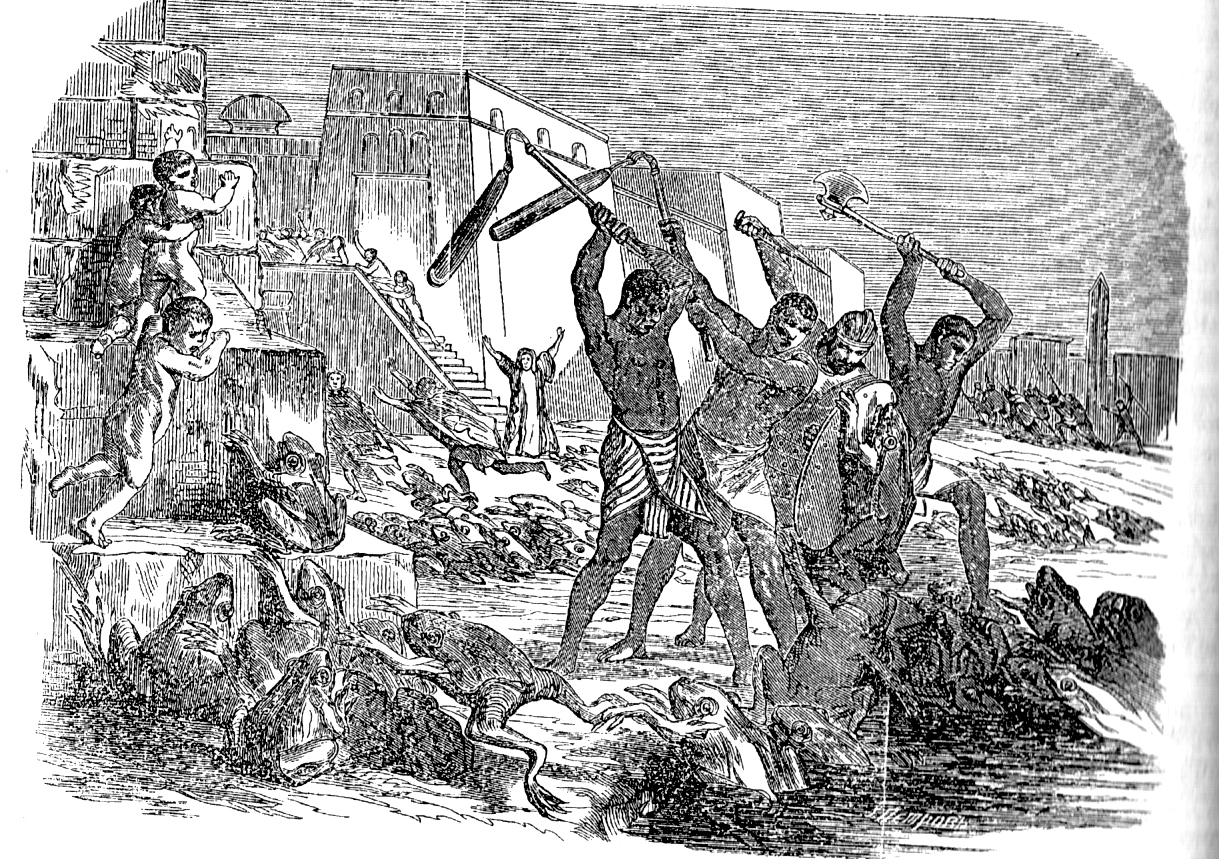
The Plague of Frogs (illustration from the 1891 Bible encyclopedia of Archimandrite Nikiphor)

A Midrash taught that the frogs were the most grievous of the ten plagues. The Midrash taught that the frogs destroyed the Egyptians' bodies, as Psalm 78:45 says "frogs . . . destroyed them," and the frogs emasculated the Egyptians, as Exodus 7:28 says that the frogs would "come into . . . [the Egyptians'] bedchamber, and upon [their] bed." The Midrash taught that the frogs told the Egyptians that the coinage of their gods was abolished, and the Egyptians' own coinage—their ability to procreate—was also rendered invalid. The Midrash reasoned that as the word "destroyed" in Genesis 38:9 applied to checking procreation in the passage about Onan's seed, as "he destroyed it on the ground," so the Midrash reasoned that Psalm 78:45 means to convey that the Egyptians' procreation was checked as well when it says, "frogs . . . destroyed them." And the Midrash deduced that the frogs spoke because Exodus 8:8 says, "concerning the frogs," and the words for "concerning," al debar, may also be read, "because of the words of."

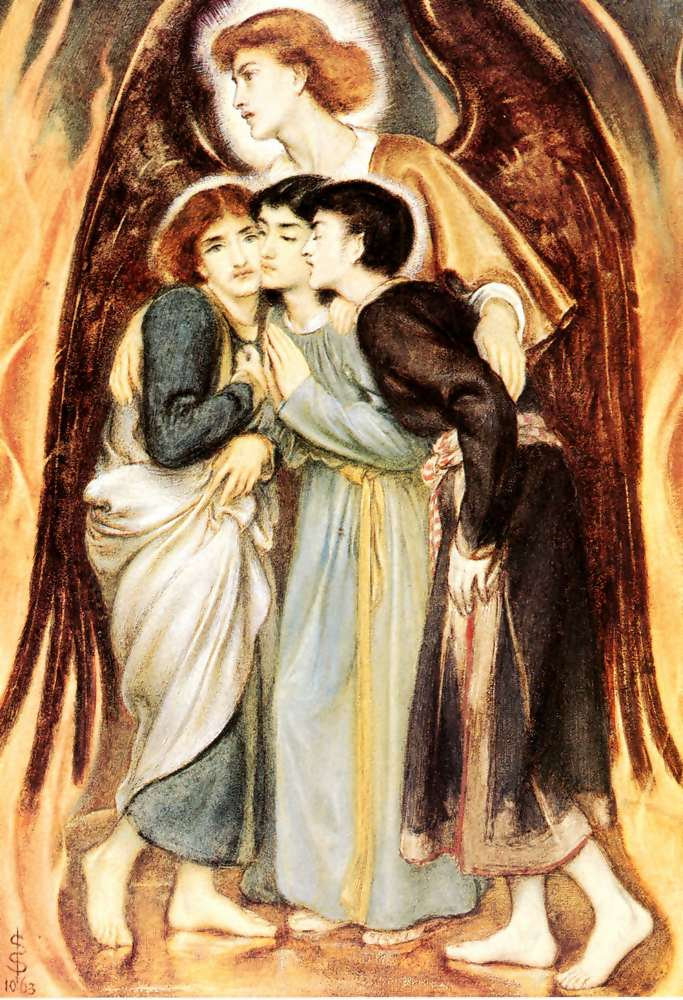
Shadrach, Meshach, and Abednego (Hananiah, Mishael, and Azariah) (painting by Simeon Solomon)

Thaddeus of Rome taught that Hananiah, Mishael and Azariah (also known as Shadrach, Meshach, and Abednego) delivered themselves to the Fiery Furnace to sanctify the Divine Name in Daniel 3:8–30 because they deduced from Exodus 7:28 that the frogs of the plague, which had not been commanded to sanctify the Divine Name, nonetheless jumped into hot ovens at God's behest. So Hananiah, Mishael and Azariah reasoned that people, whom Leviticus 22:32 does command to sanctify the Divine Name, should be willing to bear hot ovens for that reason. Thaddeus of Rome deduced that the ovens into which the frogs jumped were hot from the proximity of the words "ovens" and "kneading troughs" in Exodus 7:28, reasoning that kneading troughs are found near ovens when ovens are hot.

The Tosefta deduced from Exodus 1:8 that Pharaoh began to sin first before the people, and thus as indicated by Exodus 7:29 and 8:4, God struck him first and then the people.

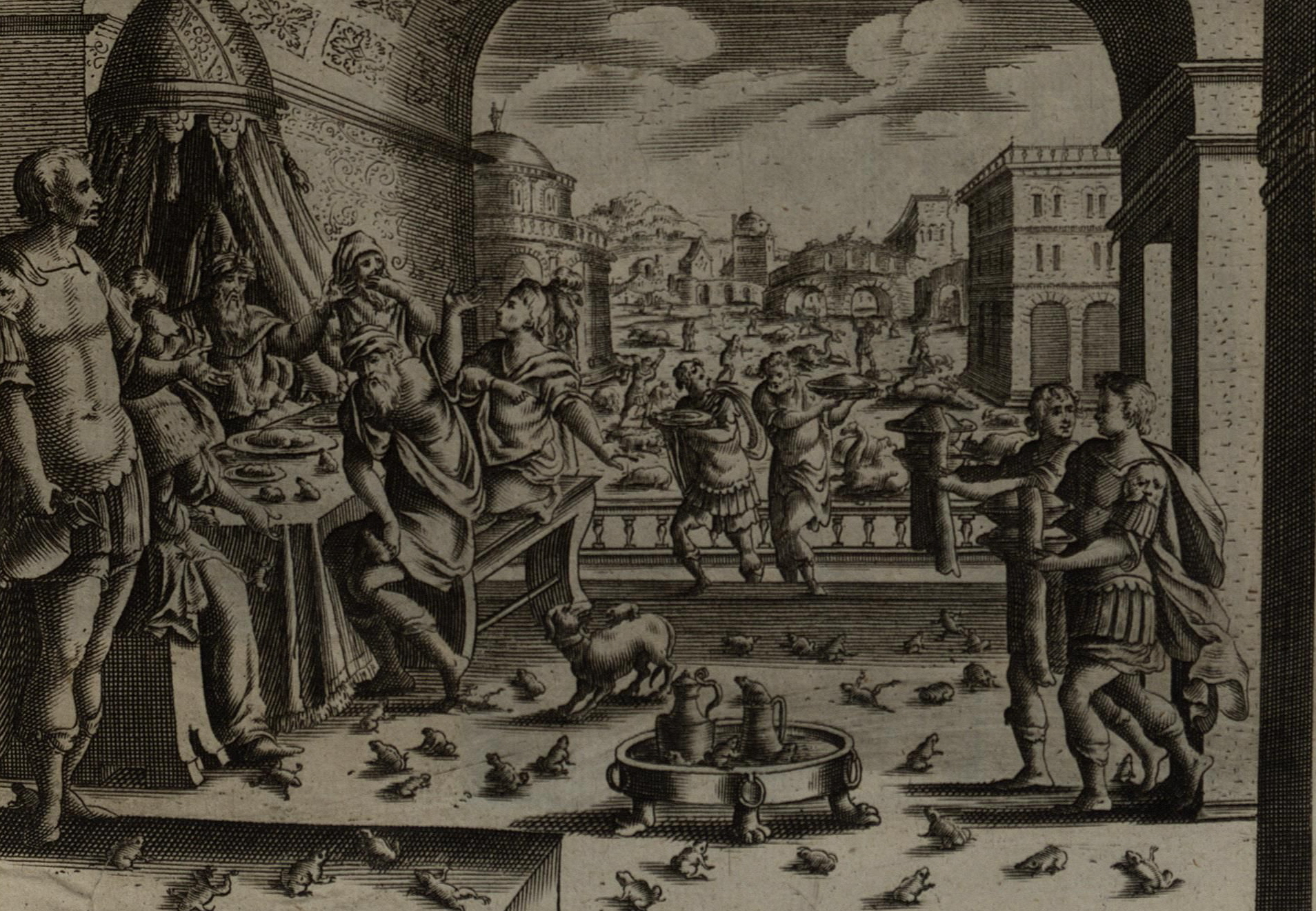
The Plague of Frogs (1670 engraving by Gerard Jollain)

=== Exodus chapter 8 ===
Rabbi Eleazar taught that when Exodus 8:2 (8:6 in the KJV) reports that "the frog came up, and covered the land of Egypt," it was initially just one frog, which bred prolifically and filled the land. The Tannaim disputed the matter. Rabbi Akiva said that one frog filled the whole of Egypt by breeding. But Rabbi Eleazar ben Azariah chastised Akiva for dabbling in aggadah, and taught that one frog croaked for others, and they joined the first frog.

A Midrash interpreted the words of Proverbs 29:23, "A man's pride shall bring him low; but he that is of a lowly spirit shall attain to honor," to apply to Pharaoh and Moses, respectively. The Midrash taught that the words, "A man's pride shall bring him low," apply to Pharaoh, who in Exodus 5:2 haughtily asked, "Who is the Lord that I should hearken to His voice?" and so, as Psalm 136:15 reports, God "overthrew Pharaoh and his host." And the Midrash taught that the words, "but he that is of a lowly spirit shall attain to honor," apply to Moses, who in Exodus 8:5 (8:9 in the KJV), humbly asked Pharaoh, "Have this glory over me; at what time shall I entreat for you . . . that the frogs be destroyed," and was rewarded in Exodus 9:29 with the opportunity to say, "As soon as I am gone out of the city, I will spread forth my hands to the Lord [and] the thunders shall cease, neither shall there be any more hail."

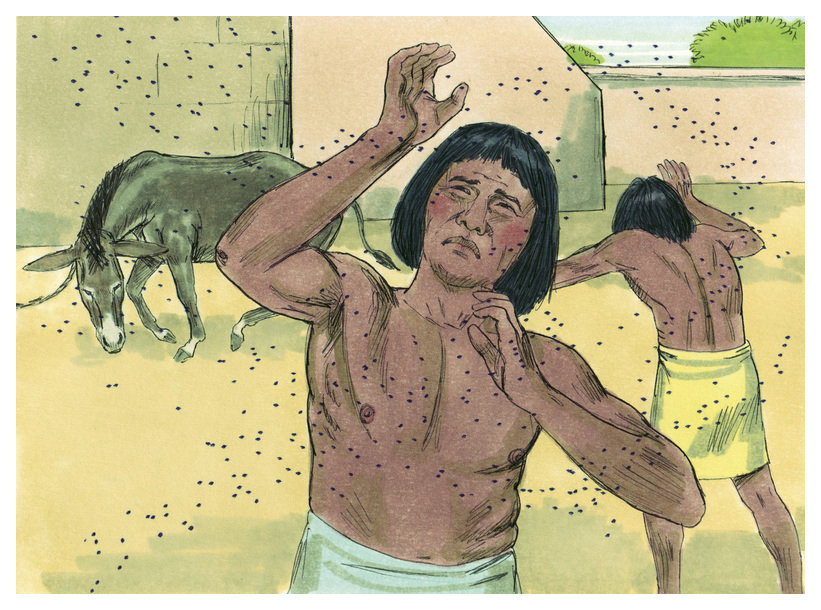
The plague of gnats (1984 illustration by Jim Padgett, courtesy of Distant Shores Media/Sweet Publishing)

Rabbi Eleazar deduced from the magicians' recognition of "the finger of God" in Exodus 8:15 (8:19 in the KJV) that a demonic spirit cannot produce a creature less than a barleycorn in size. Rav Papa said that a spirit cannot even produce something the size of a camel, but a spirit can collect the elements of a larger object and thus produce the illusion of creating it, but a spirit cannot do even that with a smaller object.

Rabbi Jose the Galilean reasoned that as the phrase "the finger of God" in Exodus 8:15 (8:19 in the KJV) referred to 10 plagues, "the great hand" (translated "the great work") in Exodus 14:31 (in connection with the miracle of the Reed Sea) must refer to 50 plagues upon the Egyptians, and thus to a variety of cruel and strange deaths.

Rabbi Phinehas ben Hama reasoned that as the phrase "the finger of God" in Exodus 8:15 (8:19 in the KJV) referred to 10 plagues, "the hand of God" in Job 19:21 (in connection with Job's poverty) must refer to 50 plagues.

Reading “the finger of God” in Exodus 8:15 (8:19 in the KJV), Rabbi Ishmael said that each of the five fingers of God's right hand appertain to the mystery of Redemption. Rabbi Ishmael said that God showed the little finger of the hand to Noah, pointing out how to make the Ark, as in Genesis 6:15, God says, "And this is how you shall make it." With the second finger, next to the little one, God smote the Egyptians with the ten plagues, as Exodus 8:15 (8:19 in the KJV) says, “The magicians said to Pharaoh, ‘This is the finger of God.’” With the middle finger, God wrote the Tablets of the Law, as Exodus 31:18 says, “And He gave to Moses, when He had made an end of communing with him . . . tables of stone, written with the finger of God.” With the index finger, God showed Moses what the children of Israel should give for the redemption of their souls, as Exodus 30:13 says, “This they shall give . . . half a shekel for an offering to the Lord.” With the thumb and all the hand, God will in the future smite God's enemies (who Rabbi Ishmael identified as the children of Esau and Ishmael), as Micah 5:9 says, “Let your hand be lifted up above your adversaries, and let all your enemies be cut off.”

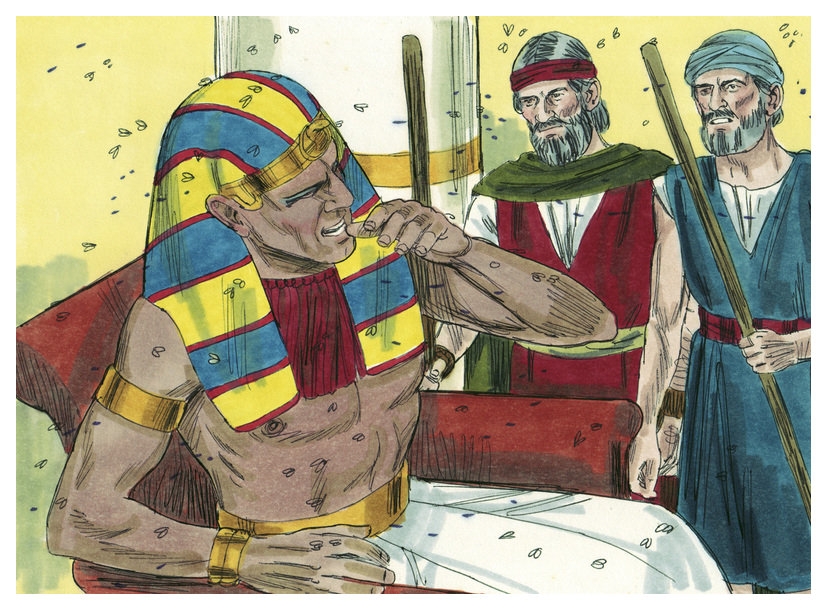
Pharaoh told Moses to have the people offer their sacrifices in Egypt. (1984 illustration by Jim Padgett, courtesy of Distant Shores Media/Sweet Publishing)

A Midrash interpreted the words of Exodus 8:22 (8:26 in the KJV), "Lo, if we sacrifice the abomination of the Egyptians before their eyes, will they not stone us?" to teach that the Egyptians saw the lamb as a god. Thus, when God told Moses to slay the paschal lamb (as reflected in Exodus 12:21), Moses asked God how he could possibly do so, when the lamb was as Egyptian god. God replied that the Israelites would not depart from Egypt until they slaughtered the Egyptian gods before the Egyptians' eyes, so that God might teach them that their gods were really nothing at all. And thus God did so, for on the same night that God slew the Egyptian firstborn, the Israelites slaughtered their paschal lambs and ate them. When the Egyptians saw their firstborn slain and their gods slaughtered, they could do nothing, as Numbers 33:4 reports, "While the Egyptians were burying them whom the Lord had smitten among them, even all their firstborn; upon their gods also the Lord executed judgment."

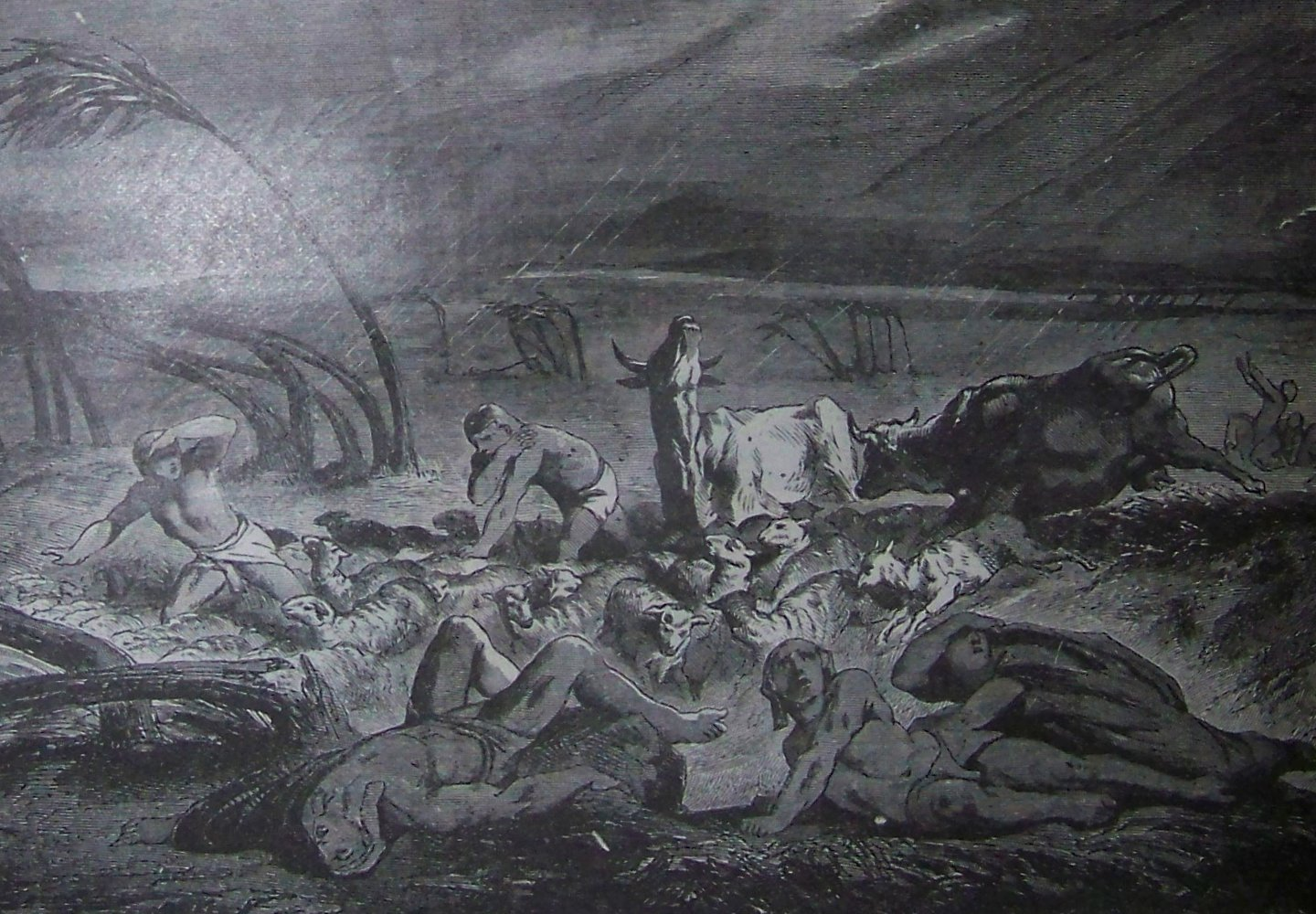
The Plague of Hail (illustration from the 1890 Holman Bible)

=== Exodus chapter 9 ===
The Pirke De-Rabbi Eliezer taught that for every plague that God brought upon the Egyptians, the magicians also produced the plague, until God brought upon them the boils, and then the magicians were not able to stand to do likewise, as Exodus 9:11 says, "And the magicians could not stand before Moses because of the boils."

A Midrash taught that when God perceived that Pharaoh did not relent after the first five plagues, God decided that even if Pharaoh now wished to repent, God would harden Pharaoh's heart to exact the whole punishment from him. Thus Exodus 9:12 reports that "the Lord hardened the heart of Pharaoh." And the Midrash explained that the reference in Exodus 9:12, "as the Lord had spoken to Moses," referred to God's prediction in Exodus 7:3 that "I will harden Pharaoh's heart."

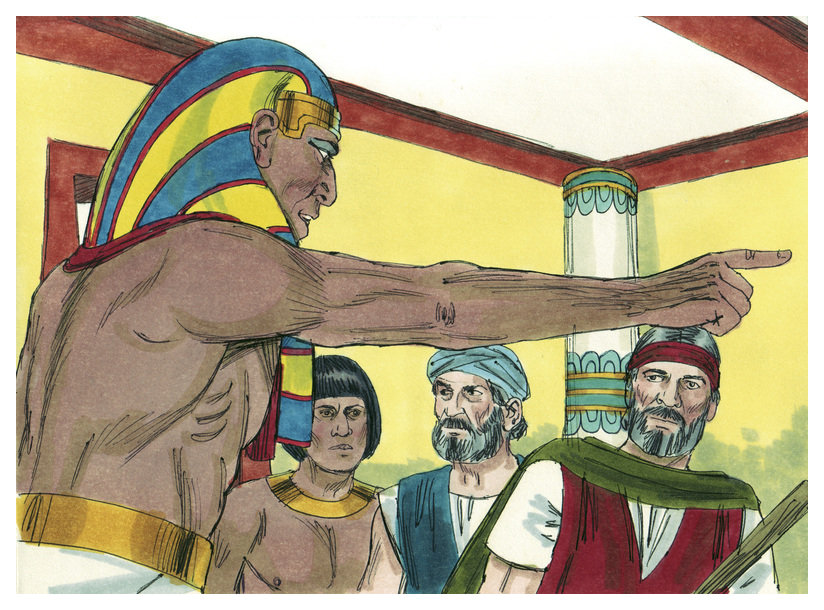
Pharaoh Changed His Mind (1984 illustration by Jim Padgett, courtesy of Distant Shores Media/Sweet Publishing)

In Exodus 9:12, Pharaoh's heart is hardened. A Midrash catalogued the wide range of additional capabilities of the heart reported in the Hebrew Bible. The heart speaks, sees, hears, walks, falls, stands, rejoices, cries, is comforted, is troubled, grows faint, grieves, fears, can be broken, becomes proud, rebels, invents, cavils, overflows, devises, desires, goes astray, lusts, is refreshed, can be stolen, is humbled, is enticed, errs, trembles, is awakened, loves, hates, envies, is searched, is rent, meditates, is like a fire, is like a stone, turns in repentance, becomes hot, dies, melts, takes in words, is susceptible to fear, gives thanks, covets, becomes hard, makes merry, acts deceitfully, speaks from out of itself, loves bribes, writes words, plans, receives commandments, acts with pride, makes arrangements, and aggrandizes itself.

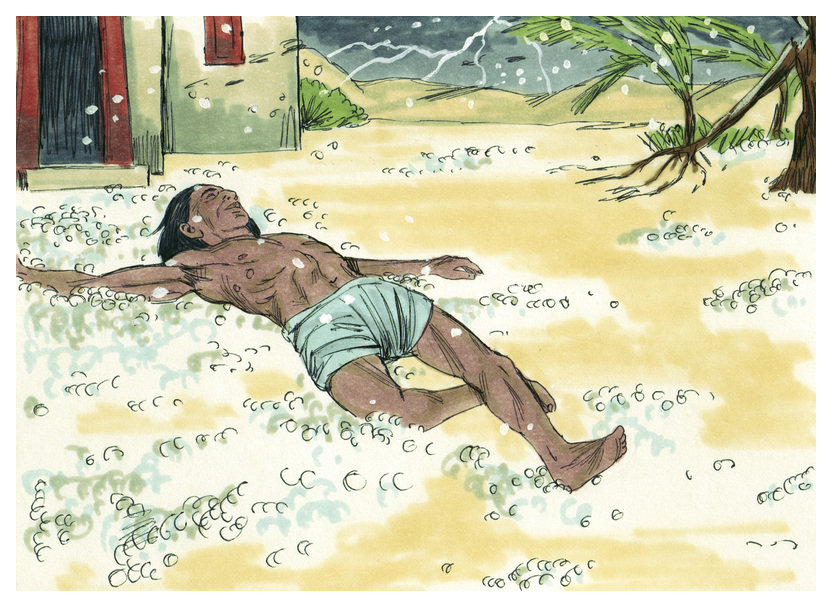
The hail killed all the people out in the open. (1984 illustration by Jim Padgett, courtesy of Distant Shores Media/Sweet Publishing)

Exodus 9:13–34 sets forth the plague of hail. The Gemara told of the miracle of the hailstones (avnei elgavish) of which Ezekiel 13:11, 13:13, and 38:22 speak. A Midrash taught that they were stones (avanim) which remained suspended for the sake of a man (al gav ish) and came down for the sake of a man. The hailstones remained suspended for the sake of a man—this was Moses, of whom Numbers 12:3 says, "Now the man Moses was very meek," and Exodus 9:33 says, "And the thunder and hail ceased, and the rain poured not upon the earth." The hailstones came down for the sake of a man—this was Joshua, of whom Numbers 27:18 says, "Take Joshua the son of Nun, a man in whom there is spirit," and Joshua 10:11 says, "And it came to pass as they fled from before Israel, while they were at the descent of Beth-Horon, that the Lord cast down great stones."

Rabbi Nechunia, son of Hakkanah, taught that God killed Pharaoh, and then because of Pharaoh's repentance, delivered him from among the dead. Rabbi Nechunia deduced that Pharaoh had died from Exodus 9:15, in which God told Moses to tell Pharaoh, "For now I had put forth my hand, and smitten you."

Reading Exodus 9:20, “Those among Pharaoh’s courtiers who feared the Lord’s word brought their slaves and livestock indoors to safety,” the Midrash HaGadol taught that one can surely draw the inference that if those who fear God on a particular occasion are saved from punishment, how much more will those who fear God all their life be saved.

The Pharisees noted that while in Exodus 5:2, Pharaoh asked who God was, once God had smitten him, in Exodus 9:27 Pharaoh acknowledged that God was righteous. Citing this juxtaposition, the Pharisees complained against heretics who placed the name of earthly rulers above the name of God.

The Mishnah echoed Exodus 9:31–32 by listing wheat, barley, and spelt as typical grains.

Interpreting Exodus 9:34, "And when Pharaoh saw that the rain and the hail and the thunders had ceased, he sinned yet more," a Midrash taught that so it always is with the wicked: As long as they are in trouble, they humble themselves. But as soon as trouble passes, they return to their perversity.

== In medieval Jewish interpretation ==
The parashah is discussed in these medieval Jewish sources:

=== Exodus chapter 6 ===
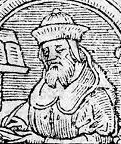
Rashi

Rashi taught that the phrase "I am the Lord" in Exodus 6:2 meant that God is faithful to recompense all those who follow God—faithful to punish when the phrase appears together with a punishment, and faithful to reward when the phrase appears together with a commandment.

Abraham ibn Ezra read God's statement "And I appeared" in Exodus 6:3 to indicate that the Patriarchs received their prophesies in night visions.

Saadia Gaon taught that the word "only" is omitted from the statement in Exodus 6:3, which says, "I did not make Myself known to them by My name YHVH." According to his interpretation, this verse should be understood to mean, "I did not make Myself known to them only by My name YHVH," indicating that God also revealed Godself using the name "El Shaddai."

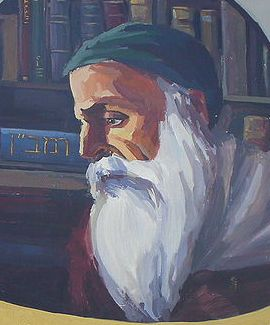
Nachmanides

Ibn Ezra quotes Jeshua ben Judah as saying that Abraham and Jacob literally did not know the Name יְהוָה (YHVH), but Moses filled it in when writing down the Torah. However, Ibn Ezra disagrees with this, asking how Moses could dare to write a name that God had not uttered.

Rashi noted that Exodus 6:3 does not read, "But My Name YHVH I did not inform them"; instead, it reads, "I did not become known." According to Rashi, the name YHVH indicates God's attribute of faithfulness, but as the Divine promises to the Patriarchs were not fulfilled in their lifetimes, the meaning of the name YHVH was not made tangible to them (even as the name itself was used in speech).

Nachmanides interpreted God's statement in Exodus 6:3 as indicating that God previously manifested in the form of El Shaddai. In this form, God performs hidden miracles that seem part of the natural order to the observer. However, God did not reveal the name YHVH, associated with openly performing miracles that override the natural order.

=== Exodus chapter 7 ===
In Exodus 7:3, God states, "I will harden Pharaoh's heart." This statement led Ibn Ezra to question: If God is the one who hardened Pharaoh's heart, what was Pharaoh's transgression, and what was his sin? Ibn Ezra responded that God grants people wisdom and instills the intelligence in their hearts to either accept divine power for good or to lessen the evil that is destined to come upon them.

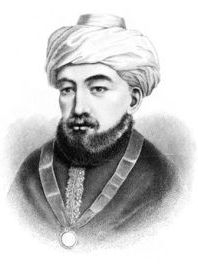
Maimonides

Reading God's statement in Exodus 7:3 that "I will harden Pharaoh's heart," the report of Exodus 9:12 that "the Lord hardened the heart of Pharaoh," and similar statements in Exodus 4:21; 10:1, 20, 27; 11:10; and 14:4, 8, and 17, Maimonides concluded that it is possible for a person to commit such a great sin, or so many sins, that God decrees that the punishment for these willing and knowing acts is the removal of the privilege of repentance (teshuvah). The offender would thus be prevented from doing repentance and would not have the power to return from the offense, and the offender would die and be lost because of the offense. Maimonides read this to be what God said in Isaiah 6:10: "Make the heart of this people fat, and make their ears heavy, and their eyes weak, lest they see with their eyes and hear with their ears, and their hearts will understand, do repentance and be healed." Similarly, 2 Chronicles 36:16 reports, "They ridiculed the messengers of God, disdained His words and insulted His prophets until the anger of God rose upon the people, without possibility of healing." Maimonides interpreted these verses to teach that Pharaoh—and, assumedly, the Egyptian collective—sinned willingly and to such an egregious extent that they deserved to have repentance withheld from them. Thus, because Pharaoh sinned on his own at the beginning, harming the Jews who lived in his land (as Exodus 1:10 reports him scheming, "Let us deal craftily with them"), God issued the judgment that repentance would be withheld from Pharaoh until he received his punishment. Therefore, God said in Exodus 14:4, "I will harden the heart of Pharaoh." Maimonides explained that God sent Moses to tell Pharaoh to send out the Jews and do repentance when God had already told Moses that Pharaoh would refuse because God sought to inform humanity that when God withholds repentance from a sinner, the sinner will not be able to repent. Maimonides made clear that God did not decree that Pharaoh harm the Jewish people; rather, Pharaoh sinned willifully on his own, and he thus deserved to have the privilege of repentance withheld from him.

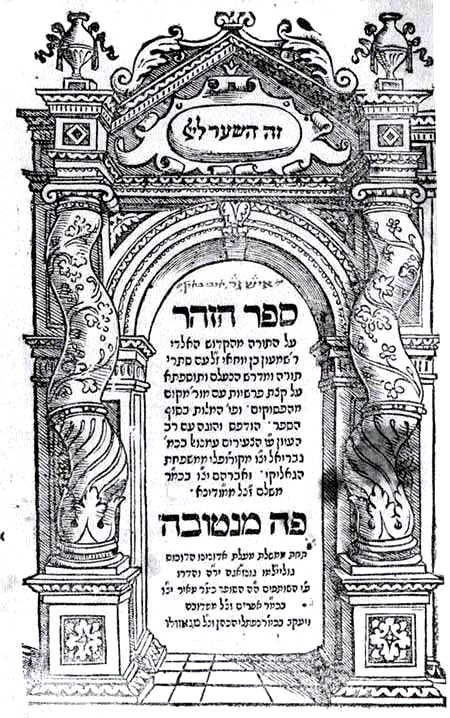
Zohar

The Zohar taught that the “mixed multitude” (רַב עֵרֶב, erev rav) mentioned in Exodus 12:38 consisted entirely of Egyptian sorcerers and magicians, who sought to oppose God's works, as Exodus 7:11 reports, “And the magicians of Egypt, they also did in like manner with their enchantments.” When they beheld the signs and the wonders that Moses performed, they came to Moses to be converted (to the Israelite faith). God advised Moses not to accept them, but Moses argued that now that they had seen God's power, they desired to accept the Israelites' faith, and if they saw God's power every day, they would learn that there is no God like God. So Moses accepted them. Exodus 12:38 called them a “mixed multitude” because they consisted of all the grades of Egyptian magicians, at their head being Jannes and Jambres. During the day, these wizards practiced their enchantments, and after sunset, they made observations of the heavens until the middle of the ninth hour, which was called the “great evening” (רַב עֵרֶב, erev rav, which means both “great multitude” and “great evening”). The lesser magicians then observed that until midnight. The Egyptians, who had great faith in the chief wizards, thus called them the “great evening” (רַב עֵרֶב, erev rav).

=== Exodus chapter 8 ===
Rashi read the words of Pharaoh's magicians in Exodus 8:15, “This is the finger of God,” to indicate that they perceived that this plague was not the result of sorcery but the Omnipresent.

Rashbam, however, read Exodus 8:15, “This is the finger of God,” to indicate that the magicians assessed that the plague was a natural disaster not caused by Moses and Aaron, for if the lice had resulted from the sorcery of Moses and Aaron, then the magicians would have been able to replicate it. Ibn Ezra and Hezekiah ben Manoah (Hizkuni) similarly read the magicians’ remark to indicate that the magicians thought that a natural disaster had caused the plague, because the magicians said, “This is the finger of God,” and not, “This is the finger of the Lord.”

Nachmanides, however, disagreed with Ibn Ezra's reading, arguing that a matter of chance is not called “the finger of God,” only a punishment from God is called that, as in 1 Samuel 12:15, “the hand of the Lord.” Further, Nachmanides noted that in the next plagues, Pharaoh no longer called on the magicians to do the same thing, indicating that the magicians had already conceded that the plagues were God's doing.

=== Exodus chapter 9 ===
Saadia Gaon read the words, “He that feared the word of the Lord among the servants of Pharaoh,” in Exodus 9:20 to indicate that those servants of Pharaoh feared God's strength and power.

== In modern interpretation ==
The parashah is discussed in these modern sources:

=== Exodus chapter 6 ===
Neḥama Leibowitz identified the following chiastic structure in God's speech to Moses in Exodus 6:2–8:

^{2}And God spoke to Moses, and said to him:

A: "I am the Lord;

B: ^{3}And I appeared to Abraham, to Isaac, and to Jacob, as God Almighty, but by My name YHWH I made Me not known to them.

C: ^{4}And I have also established My covenant with them, to give them the land of Canaan, the land of their sojournings, wherein they sojourned.

D: ^{5}And moreover I have heard the groaning of the children of Israel, whom the Egyptians keep in bondage; and I have remembered My covenant.

E: ^{6}Therefore say to the children of Israel: I am the Lord, and I will bring you out from under the burdens of the Egyptians, and I will deliver you from their bondage, and I will redeem you with an outstretched arm, and with great judgments;

D^{1}: ^{7}And I will take you to Me for a people, and I will be to you a God; and you shall know that I am the Lord your God, who brought you out from under the burdens of the Egyptians.

C^{1}: ^{8}And I will bring you in to the land, concerning which I lifted up My hand to give it

B^{1}: to Abraham, to Isaac, and to Jacob; and I will give it you for a heritage:

A^{1}: I am the Lord."

Robert Alter wrote that the designation אֵל שַׁדָּי, El Shaddai, in Exodus 6:3, also used five times in the Patriarchal Tales, is an archaic, evidently Canaanite combination of divine names. אֵל, El, was the high god of the Canaanite pantheon (although the Hebrew word is also a common noun meaning “god”), and some scholars link שַׁדָּי, Shaddai, with a term for “mountain,” and others associate it with fertility.

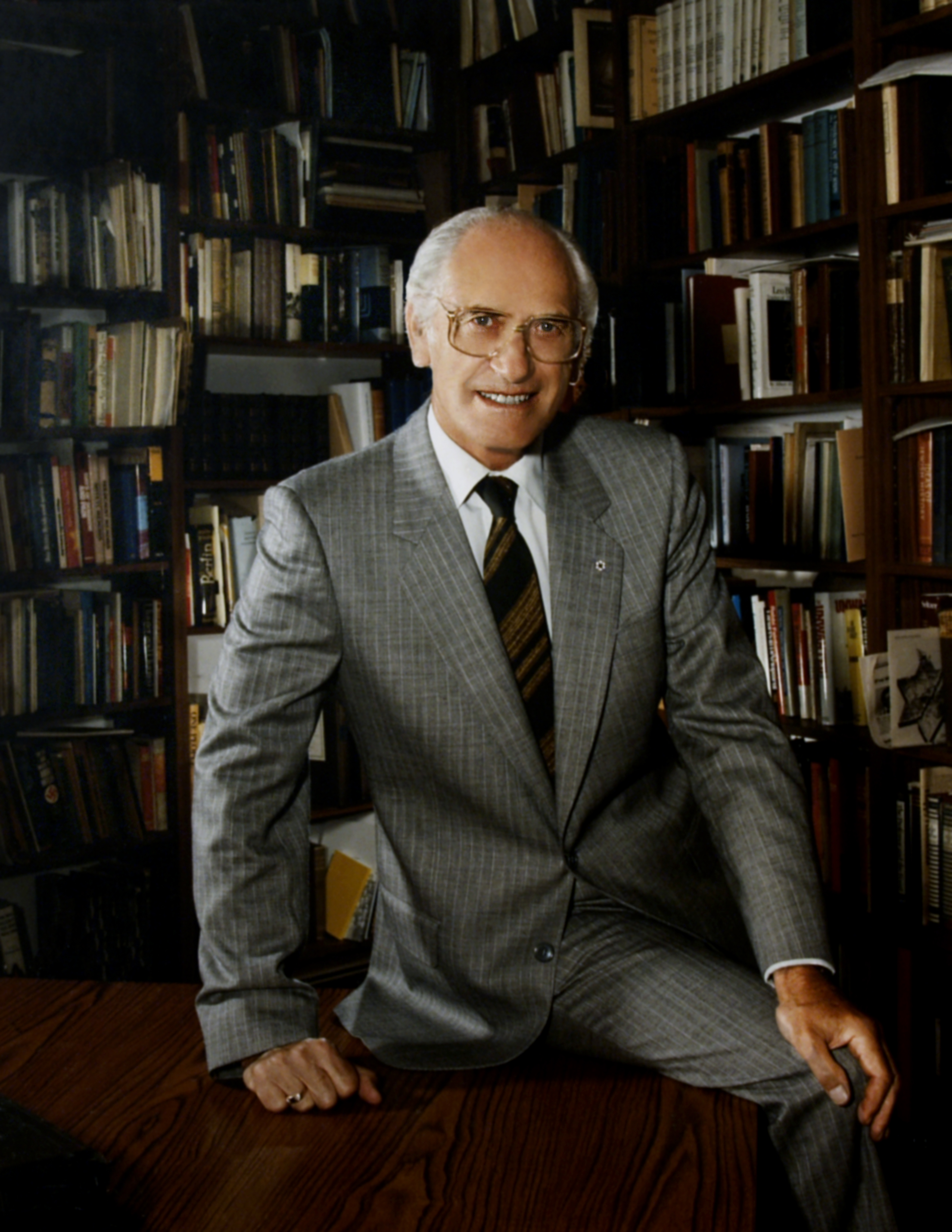
Plaut

Gunther Plaut noted the difficulty that Exodus 6:3–4 says that it is יְהוָה, YHVH, who guarantees the covenant made with the ancestors, although they did not know God by this Name, but this contradicts the frequent occurrence of the name YHVH, in Genesis, implying that the forefathers knew the Name. Plaut reports that Biblical scholars have attempted to solve this contradiction in various ways, many positing that Exodus 6 belongs to the Priestly source, which held that the Patriarchs knew God only as Elohim or El Shaddai and that God first disclosed the Name YHVH, to Moses. According to this theory, the passages in Genesis that use the Name YHVH and the passages in Exodus 3 that refer to YHVH are assigned to the J tradition. Adherents of this theory argue that in Exodus 6:3, the P school connected YHVH with Moses to establish the legitimacy of the priestly hierarchy. Acknowledging that this explanation does not address the text as it is now, Plaut presented the alternative explanation (which Plaut attributed to the Israeli scholar Yehezkel Kaufmann) that Moses and the people had since patriarchal time known the Name YHVH as God's name, but this knowledge had hardly been more than a “customary appellation.” In Exodus 6, however, after his first trials and failures, Moses confronted God again, and this time, God revealed the Name more fully, which is to say that Moses saw God more clearly than before, in a new light. Turning to the etymology of the Name, Plaut reported that the most widely accepted explanation connects the Name with the word hayah ("to be"), a causative form of which could be Yahveh, “one who causes to be.” Another form could be Yahuah, “he who indeed will (show himself to) be,” or “he who proves himself.” Plaut reported a different theory holds that the name was read Yahuh, a version of Yehu, a form that occurs several times independently in the Bible as יהרא and frequently as a prefix or suffix to proper names. According to Martin Buber, Yahu was a kind of “primitive sound,” an exclamation denoting awe, recognition, and affirmation: “Oh is the one!” or “Yah is the one!” or “Yah is!” or “Yah exists!” Finally, Plaut related yet another approach, seeing YHVH, as having developed from a cultic name connected with El, perhaps El du Yahwi—“El who creates”—and that in time, the Name Yahwi split off from El, ousting the Name El from preeminence.

Sarna and Tigay noted that Exodus 6:7, “I will take you to Me for a people, and I will be to you a God,” prefigures the covenant that God would establish at Sinai.

Alter noted that the idea in Exodus 6:7, “that I am the Lord your God Who takes you out from under the burdens of Egypt,” is emphasized repeatedly in the Torah and later books of the Bible. Alter called “the cornerstone of Israelite faith” that God had proven God's divinity and attachment to Israel by liberating the Israelites from Egyptian slavery. Alter reported that some modern scholars, arguing from the absence of Egyptian evidence on any Hebrew slave population or any mention of an exodus, have raised doubts about whether the Hebrews were ever in Egypt. Alter concluded that the story is a schematization and simplification of complex historical processes. Alter viewed it quite likely that a sizeable segment of the Hebrew people remained in the high country of eastern Canaan and never went down to Egypt. Yet Alter also found it hard to imagine that the Israelites would have invented a story of national origins involving the humiliation of slavery without some kernel of historical memory.

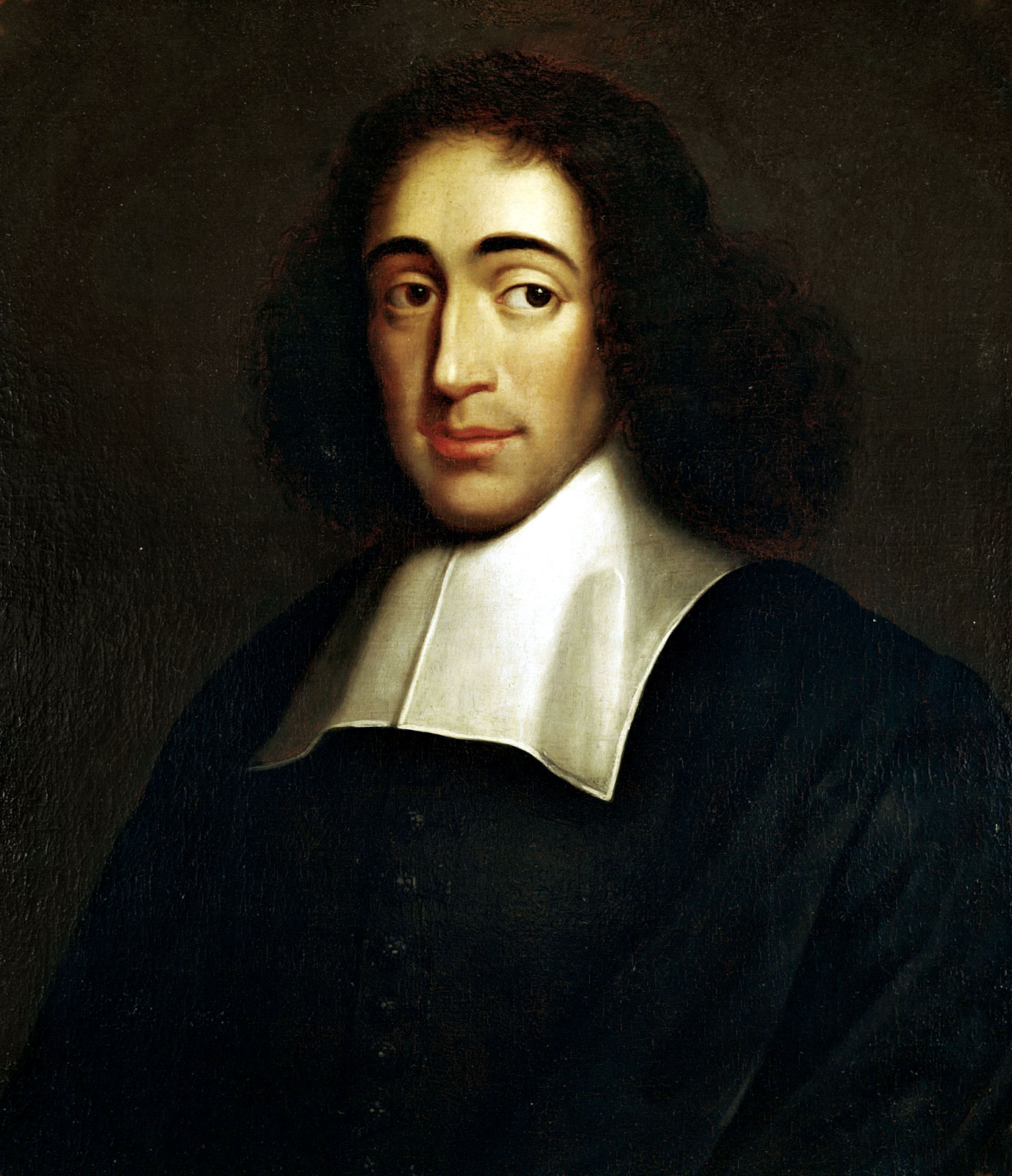
Spinoza

=== Exodus chapter 7 ===
Baruch Spinoza deduced from Exodus 7:1 that in Scripture, the word "prophet" (נָבִיא, navi) means "interpreter of God." Spinoza read God's words to Moses in Exodus 7:1, "See, I place you in the role of God to Pharaoh, with your brother Aaron as your prophet,” to imply that in interpreting the words of Moses to Pharaoh, Aaron would act as a prophet.

Greta Hort argued that the plagues concentrated within a period of about 12 months, based on the report of Exodus 7:7 that Moses was 80 years old when he first spoke with the pharaoh and the report of Deuteronomy 34:7 that Moses was 120 years old when he died, after spending 40 years in the wilderness.

Sarna noted that Aaron, not Moses, turned his rod into a snake in Exodus 7:10. Sarna explained that Moses thus tacitly asserted his equal status with Pharaoh. Moses came to negotiate with Pharaoh as the representative of the people of Israel. Just as Pharaoh had his magicians, Moses had his assistant, Aaron. Sarna noted that in the narratives of the Ten Plagues, Aaron acted only as long as the Egyptian magicians appeared present. After their ingenuity failed them and they faded from the story, Moses acted personally to bring about the remaining plagues.

Everett Fox noted that “glory” (כְּבוֹד, kevod) and “stubbornness” (כָּבֵד לֵב, kaved lev) are leading words throughout the book of Exodus that give it a sense of unity. Similarly, William Propp identified the root kvd—connoting heaviness, glory, wealth, and firmness—as a recurring theme in Exodus: Moses suffered from a heavy mouth in Exodus 4:10 and heavy arms in Exodus 17:12; Pharaoh had firmness of heart in Exodus 7:14; 8:11, 28; 9:7, 34; and 10:1; Pharaoh made Israel's labor heavy in Exodus 5:9; God in response sent heavy plagues in Exodus 8:20; 9:3, 18, 24; and 10:14, so that God might be glorified over Pharaoh in Exodus 14:4, 17, and 18; and the book culminates with the descent of God's fiery Glory, described as a “heavy cloud,” first upon Sinai and later upon the Tabernacle in Exodus 19:16; 24:16–17; 29:43; 33:18, 22; and 40:34–38.

Plaut reported that scholars generally agree that the term “Hebrew” (עִברִי, Ivri), as in Exodus 7:16 and 9:1 and 13, came from the name of a group called Habiru or Apiru, people who had lost their status in the community from which they came, and who were not necessarily related except by common fate. Plaut wrote that the Habiru was a class of people who lived in the Fertile Crescent during the 19th to 14th centuries B.C.E. who may originally have come from Arabia, became prominent in Mesopotamia, and later spread to Egypt. The Habiru followed distinct occupations, particularly mercenaries and administrators. Although at first, they were nomads or seminomads, they later settled but were usually considered foreigners and maintained their group identity. The term Habiru referred not so much to an ethnic or linguistic group as a social or political group. Plaut reported that the words Habiru and “Hebrew” (עִברִי, Ivri) appear to share a common linguistic root. Plaut concluded that Israelites in Egypt likely occupied positions similar to, or because of familial ties, identified with, the Habiru. When non-Israelites repeatedly applied the term to the Israelites, the Israelites themselves began to use the name Habiru, which they pronounced Ivri. Plaut considered it possible that for some time, the term Ivri was used only when the Israelites spoke of themselves to outsiders and when outsiders referred to them. Thus Genesis 14:13 calls Abram Ivri vis-a-vis an outsider, and Jonah says, "I am an Ivri,” when asked his identity by non-Israelite sailors in Jonah 1:9, but otherwise Israelites referred to themselves by their tribes (for example, Judah or Ephraim) or by their common ancestor, Israel.

Plaut reported that most moderns believe that the plague stories are unacceptable as fact and must be deemed legendary and unhistorical. Plaut argued that it was a mistake to consider the stories literally rather than as “essentially interpretive and legendary”—asserting that the release of the Israelites from slavery was unprecedented and could only be explained by crediting God. Plaut suggested that there was “possibly or even likely” a historical kernel that the biblical tradition transposed into the moral, religious realm. Thus, Plaut noted that some claim that the bloodiness of the Nile was caused by special deposits that the river picked up from the mountains (hence the name "Red Nile” for one branch), that frogs accompanied a large-scale inundation, and that lice, gnats, and insects regularly infested the area. Plaut concluded that the plague stories teach: “Israel's redemption was the ultimate marvel, and it was caused by God. To bring it about, nature itself was harnessed, the drama of the plagues was unfolded, and the ground was laid for an experience that forever after was etched into the hearts of the people and their descendants.”

John J. Collins reported that some scholars have suggested that the plague stories contain a reminiscence of a mid-fourteenth-century BCE epidemic referred to as “the Asiatic illness.”

Collins argued that the plague stories show that Exodus is not only the story of the liberation of Israel but also of the defeat and humiliation of the Egyptians, and thus involved “less than edifying” nationalistic, ethnic vengeance.

Sarna suggested that the biblical narrator might have construed the affliction of the Nile's waters and the plague of frogs as a kind of retribution for the pharaoh's decrees ordering the killing of male Israelites at birth and their drowning in the Nile.

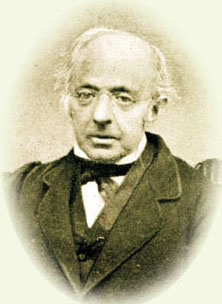
Luzzatto

=== Exodus chapter 8 ===
Reading the words of Pharaoh's magicians in Exodus 8:15, “This is the finger of God,” Samuel David Luzzatto (Shadal) wrote that although Pharaoh must have in his heart realized that the magicians were correct (and Moses was correct), Pharaoh carried on “business as usual,” as is the habit of atheists.

Alter noted that the narrative preceding Exodus 8:15 repeatedly spoke of God's “hand” or “arm,” but Pharaoh's magicians appear to concede a lesser trace of divine action in mentioning God's “finger.”

=== Exodus chapter 9 ===
Reading the report of Exodus 9:6 that “all the livestock of Egypt died,” but noting that Exodus 9:10 reports that boils subsequently struck the animals, Plaut concluded that Exodus 9:6 must be taken as hyperbole.

Jacob ben Asher (the Baal Ha-Turim) read the words, “He that feared,” in Exodus 9:20 to indicate that the Egyptians were fearful because of the sins they had committed.

Moritz Markus Kalisch reported an interpretation that Exodus 9:20 indicated a test by Moses of how far the fear of God had spread among the Egyptians.

Benno Jacob read Exodus 9:20 to indicate that some of Pharaoh's servants had become frightened of God's warning through Moses.

Reading Exodus 9:20, "Whoever feared the Lord’s word," Alter wrote that whereas elsewhere, this idiom indicates piety (as in "God-fearing"), here it has been stripped down to its literal meaning of whoever was struck with terror by God's grim threat.

== In critical analysis ==
Diagram of the Documentary Hypothesis

Some scholars who follow the Documentary Hypothesis find evidence of three or even four separate sources in the parashah. Walter Brueggemann reported that older source analysis saw Exodus 6:2–30 as an insertion by the Priestly source, addressed to a community in exile (or just out of exile), appealing to very old tradition to create a sense of structured, stable reality to give coherence, order, and legitimacy to communal life. Richard Elliott Friedman, however, saw four sources in Exodus 6 alone. Friedman saw the opening verse of Exodus 6:1 to have been composed by the Elohist (sometimes abbreviated E) who wrote in the north, in the land of the Tribe of Ephraim, possibly as early as the second half of the 9th century BCE. Friedman agreed with Brueggemann in attributing Exodus 6:2–10 and 30 to the Priestly source who wrote in the 6th or 5th century BCE. But Friedman attributed Exodus 6:12–13 and 26–28 to a later Redactor (sometimes abbreviated R). And Friedman attributed the genealogy of Exodus 6:14–25 to the Book of Records or some other separate source document, from which Friedman postulates that the Redactor chose to use only the first section covering genealogies from Reuben to Levi, stopping at Aaron.

In the balance of the parashah, Friedman attributed Exodus 7:14–18, 20b–21, and 23–29; 8:3b–11a and 16–28; and 9:1–7 and 13–34; to the Elohist; Exodus 7:1–13, 19–20a, and 22; 8:1–3a and 12–15; and 9:8–12 to the Priestly source; and Exodus 8:11b and 9:35 to the Redactor. For a color-coded display of verses according to this hypothesis, see the display of Exodus according to the Documentary Hypothesis at Wikiversity.

== Commandments ==
According to Maimonides and Sefer ha-Chinuch, there are no commandments in the parashah.

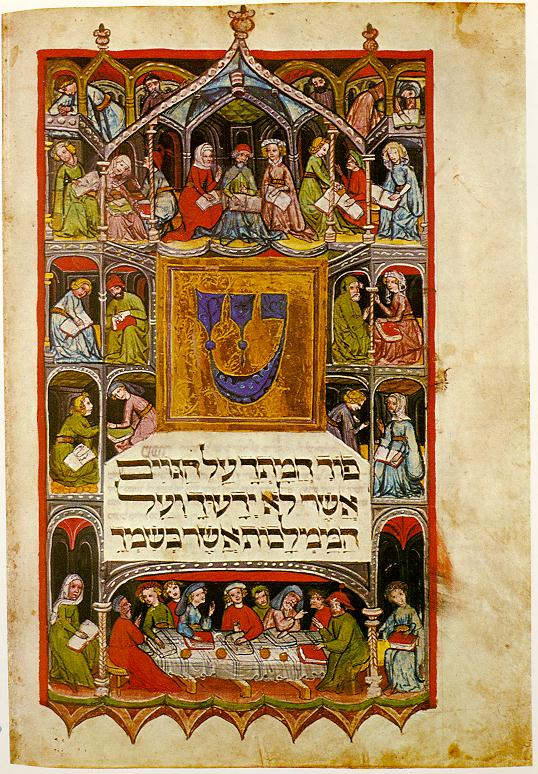
14th century German illuminated Haggadah for Passover

== In the liturgy ==
Reading the Passover Haggadah, in the magid section of the Seder, many Jews remove drops of wine from their cups for each of the ten plagues in Exodus 7:14–12:29.

Next, the Haggadah recounts the reasoning of Rabbi Jose the Galilean that as the phrase "the finger of God" in Exodus 8:15 referred to 10 plagues, "the great hand" (translated "the great work") in Exodus 14:31 must refer to 50 plagues upon the Egyptians.

And the haggadah in the magid section quotes Exodus 9:3 to elucidate the term "a mighty hand" in Deuteronomy 26:8, interpreting the "mighty hand" to mean the plague of pestilence on the Egyptian livestock.

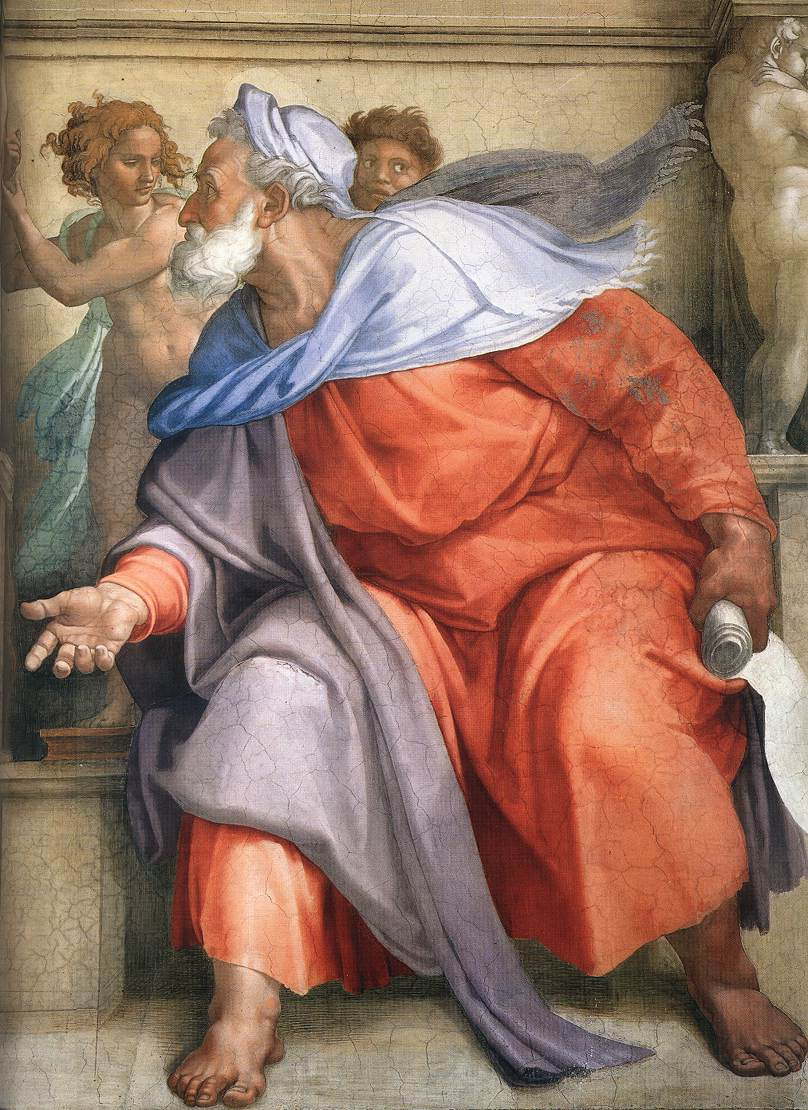
Ezekiel (1510 fresco by Michelangelo in the Sistine Chapel)

== Haftarah ==
=== Generally ===
The haftarah for the parashah is Ezekiel 28:25–29:21.

==== Connection to the Parashah ====
Both the parashah and the haftarah describe God's instructions to a prophet to confront the Pharaoh of Egypt and bring on Israel's redemption. Both the parashah and the haftarah address God's judgments (shefatim) against Pharaoh and Egypt. A monster (tannin) plays a role in both the parashah and the haftarah: In the parashah, God turns Moses' rod into a monster; the haftarah describes Pharaoh as a monster. In both the parashah and the haftarah, God attacks the river and kills fish. In both the parashah and the haftarah, God's actions would cause the Egyptians to know (ve-yade'u) God. And in both the parashah and the haftarah, God proclaims, "I am the Lord."

=== On Shabbat Rosh Chodesh ===
When the parashah coincides with Shabbat Rosh Chodesh (as it did in 2013 and 2017), the haftarah is Isaiah 66:1–24.
