= Judah Goldin =

American scholar of rabbinic literature (1914–1998)

- Born: 1914; New York City, U.S.
- Died: May 30, 1998 (aged 83–84); Bryn Mawr, Pennsylvania, U.S.
- Education: City College of New York; Columbia University; Jewish Theological Seminary
- Occupations: Scholar; professor; rabbi
- Spouse: Grace Goldin
- Children: 2
- Relatives: Harrison Goldin (nephew)

Judah Goldin (1914 – May 30, 1998) was an American scholar of rabbinic literature and translator of classical Jewish texts. He was among the earliest academics to teach Jewish studies in American universities and published extensively on Pirke Avot and aggadic Midrash.

== Early life and education ==
Goldin was born in New York City in 1914. In 1934 he earned one bachelor's degree in social science from City College of New York, and another in Hebrew literature from the Seminary College of the Jewish Theological Seminary. He later received a master's degree from Columbia University in 1938, and both a second master's degree (in 1938) and a doctorate in Hebrew literature (1943) from the Jewish Theological Seminary, where he also received rabbinic ordination.

== Academic career ==
Goldin began his academic career in 1943 at Duke University. At Duke he became one of the first three Jewish scholars appointed to teach Jewish studies in an American university, alongside Harry Wolfson of Harvard and Salo Baron of Columbia.

He subsequently taught at the University of Iowa and later served as dean of the Seminary College of the Jewish Theological Seminary of America beginning in 1952. In 1958, Goldin joined the faculty of Yale University, where he taught Jewish studies in a liberal-arts setting.

From 1973 until his retirement in 1985, Goldin was professor of post-biblical Hebrew literature at the University of Pennsylvania.

== Scholarship and honors ==
Goldin specialized in Midrash, particularly the aggadic interpretations of the Tannaim. Jeffrey Tigay wrote that “no scholar has done more than he to clarify what is happening in the nonlegal parts of Rabbinic literature or to place that literature squarely within the realm of humanistic studies.”

Goldin studied with Louis Finkelstein, Louis Ginzberg, Saul Lieberman, and H. L. Ginsberg. Jeffrey Tigay also credited Goldin’s wife, the poet and photographer Grace Goldin, with influencing his literary style.

He was awarded numerous honors, including a Guggenheim Fellowship, a Fulbright research fellowship, a fellowship of the American Academy of Arts and Sciences, and an Annenberg fellowship. A scholarly symposium was held in his honor in 1998 at the University of Pennsylvania, and published in 1999.

== Major works ==
Goldin's major scholarly works include:

- The Living Talmud: The Wisdom of the Fathers (1957)
- The Jewish Expression (1970)
- The Song at the Sea (1971)
- The Fathers According to Rabbi Nathan (1974)
- Studies in Midrash and Related Literature (1988)

== Teaching style and influence ==
Goldin's lectures were described as “electric,” and students frequently applauded at the end of class sessions.

Goldin was among the early scholars appointed to teach Jewish studies at secular American universities. Jeffrey Tigay and David Stern credited him with helping establish Jewish studies as an academic field in the United States.

== Personal life and death ==
Goldin lived for many years in Swarthmore, Pennsylvania. He was married to Grace Goldin (née Aaronson), a poet and photographer, until her death in 1995. He was the uncle of former New York City comptroller Harrison J. Goldin, as well as the uncle of the historian and rabbi Gerson D. Cohen.

Goldin died of respiratory failure at the age of 83 on May 30, 1998, at Bryn Mawr Hospital, five days after falling into a coma. He and his wife together had two children.

== Archival collections ==
Goldin's archives are preserved at the University of Pennsylvania Archives at the Library of the Katz Center for Advanced Judaic Studies.
