= Grace Goldin =

American poet and medical historian (1916–1995)

- Born: September 13, 1916; Tulsa, Oklahoma, U.S.
- Died: July 18, 1995; Swarthmore, Pennsylvania, U.S.
- Education: Barnard College
- Occupations: Poet, medical historian, photographer
- Spouse: Judah Goldin (m. 1938–1995)
- Children: 2

Grace Goldin (September 13, 1916–July 18, 1995) was an American poet, medical historian, and photographer. She wrote poetry about aging and published research on the history and architecture of hospitals.

== Early life and education ==
Grace Goldin (née Aaronson) was born in 1916 and grew up in Tulsa, Oklahoma, in an Orthodox Jewish household. Her parents were Alfred Enoch Aaronson and Millicent Lubetkin Aaronson. She graduated from Barnard College in 1937, and in 1938 married the scholar and rabbi Judah Goldin, with whom she spent decades in academic communities across the United States.

== Early literary career ==
At age 28, Goldin published Come Under the Wings, a long narrative poem based on the biblical Book of Ruth. The book won the National Jewish Book Award and was adapted for radio. She collaborated intellectually with her husband, noting that many evenings were spent developing the poem’s characters together.

Despite its success, she experienced what she later described as a “35-year case of writer’s block” before returning to poetry in her sixties.

== Medical history research ==
During her long pause from poetry, Goldin became a medical historian. While ghostwriting a public health book, she began researching nursing care prior to Florence Nightingale. Goldin subsequently spent more than twenty years traveling in Europe and North America to document historic hospitals.

Her major publications included:

- The Hospital: A Social and Architectural History (1975), co-authored with John D. Thompson, for which she wrote most of the text and contributed extensive photographs and architectural documentation.
- Work of Mercy: A Picture History of Hospitals (1994), which combined her historical research with her photography, and was completed at age 77.

Goldin argued that historic hospitals, despite poor physical conditions, often provided forms of spiritual and social support that she believed were less evident in modern hospitals.

She published articles in major medical history journals and exhibited her photography in both the United States and Canada.

== Return to poetry ==
Goldin resumed writing poetry at age 63. Between 1981 and 1991 she published three major collections focused on aging:

- Winter Rise: Poems of Aging (1981)
- To Love That Well: More Poems of Aging (1991)
- Speak Out for Age (1991)

Reviewers noted that her later poetry addressed physical decline, bereavement, and the everyday difficulties of aging. Reviews in the Philadelphia Inquirer and other publications praised the poems for their direct treatment of aging and their lack of sentimentality.

Goldin maintained that American culture needed truthful depictions of aging rather than euphemisms.

== Later years ==
Goldin lived in Swarthmore and later Haverford, Pennsylvania. She continued to write, publish, lecture, and take photographs, even though she experienced severe orthopedic problems and declining eyesight. She was scheduled to address the annual Clinical Congress of the American College of Surgeons before her death in 1995.

== Personal life and death ==
Goldin was married for 57 years to the rabbinic scholar Judah Goldin. Together they had two children. She died on July 18, 1995, of a cerebral hemorrhage at age 78.

== Archival collections ==
Goldin's archives are kept at the Cushing/Whitney Medical Library at Yale University.

== Selected works ==
=== Poetry ===
- Come Under the Wings: A Midrash on Ruth (1958)
- Winter Rise: Poems of Aging (1981)
- To Love That Well: More Poems of Aging (1991)
- Speak Out for Age (1991)

=== Medical history ===
- The Hospital: A Social and Architectural History (1975)
- Historic Hospitals of Europe, 1200-1981 (1984)
- Work of Mercy: A Picture History of Hospitals (1994)
