= Jeffrey H. Tigay =

American biblical scholar

- Born: December 25, 1941 (age 84); Detroit, MI
- Education: Ph.D. in Comparative Biblical and Ancient Near Eastern Studies from Yale University
- Occupations: Emeritus A.M. Ellis Professor of Hebrew and Semitic Languages and Literatures
- Notable work: Deuteronomy volumes of the JPS Torah Commentary
- Theological work
- Era: Late 20th and Early 21st Centuries
- Language: English
- Tradition or movement: Jewish
- Main interests: Torah, Jewish studies, Gilgamesh Epic

Jeffrey Howard Tigay (born December 25, 1941) is a modern biblical scholar who is best known for the study of Deuteronomy and in his contributions to the Deuteronomy volume of the JPS Torah Commentary (1996).

== Early life and education ==
Jeffrey H. Tigay was born in Detroit in 1941. Educated at Columbia University and gaining his B.A. in 1963, he continued toward rabbinic ordination at the Jewish Theological Seminary of America (M.H.L., 1966). He earned his Ph.D. in Comparative Biblical and Ancient Near Eastern Studies from Yale University.

== Career ==
Tigay taught in the Jewish Studies program at the University of Pennsylvania from 1971 until his retirement in 2010, and is currently the A.M. Ellis Professor of Hebrew and Semitic Languages and Literatures, Emeritus. His The Evolution of the Gilgamesh Epic (1982) summarized earlier scholarship and helped establish the notion that the standard Middle Babylonian "late version" of the epic, was in ways an original work of art itself, rather than a collection of earlier anecdotes.

== Works ==
- Literary-Critical Studies in the Gilgamesh Epic: an Assyriological contribution to Biblical literary criticism (Yale University Press, 1971)
- The Evolution of the Gilgamesh Epic (University of Pennsylvania Press, 1982)
- Empirical Models for Biblical Criticism (University of Pennsylvania Press, 1985)
- You Shall Have No Other Gods. Israelite Religion in the Light of Hebrew Inscriptions (Harvard Semitic Studies/Scholars Press, 1986)
- Studies in Midrash and related literature co-authored with Judah Goldin, Barry L. Eichler (Jewish Publication Society, 1988)
- Deuteronomy (Devarim): the traditional Hebrew text with the new JPS translation (Jewish Publication Society, 1996)
- Tehillah le-Moshe: Biblical and Judaic studies in honor of Moshe Greenberg co-authored with Moshe Greenberg, Mordechai Cogan, Barry L. Eichler (Eisenbrauns, 1997)
- The Posen Library of Jewish Culture and Civilization, Volume 1 co-edited with [ Adele Berlin] (Yale University Press, 2021)
