= List of hoards in Great Britain =

The list of hoards in Great Britain comprises significant archaeological hoards of coins, jewellery, precious and scrap metal objects and other valuable items discovered in Great Britain (England, Scotland and Wales). It includes both hoards that were buried with the intention of retrieval at a later date (personal hoards, founder's hoards, merchant's hoards, and hoards of loot), and also hoards of votive offerings which were not intended to be recovered at a later date, but excludes grave goods and single items found in isolation. The list is subdivided into sections according to archaeological and historical periods.

== Neolithic hoards ==
Hoards dating to the Neolithic period, approximately 4000 to 2000 BC, comprise stone weapons and tools such as axeheads and arrowheads. Such hoards are very rare, and only a few are known from Britain.

Hoard	Image	Date	Place of discovery	Year of discovery	Current Location	Contents
Ayton East Field Hoard		30th to 25th century BC	East Ayton; North Yorkshire; 54.255°N 0.474°W	1848	British Museum, London	3 flint axes 1 flint adze 5 arrowheads 1 polished flint knife 2 flint flakes 1 antler macehead 2 boar-tusk blades
York Hoard		30th century BC	York; North Yorkshire; 53.958°N 1.080°W	1868	Yorkshire Museum	~70 flint tools and weapons

== Bronze Age hoards ==
A large number of hoards associated with the British Bronze Age, approximately 2700 BC to 8th century BC, have been found in Great Britain. Most of these hoards comprise bronze tools and weapons such as axeheads, chisels, spearheads and knives, and in many cases may be founder's hoards buried with the intention of recovery at a later date for use in casting new bronze items. A smaller number of hoards include gold torcs and other items of jewellery. As coinage was not in use during the Bronze Age in Great Britain, there are no hoards of coins from this period.

== Iron Age hoards ==
A large number of hoards associated with the British Iron Age, approximately 8th century BC to the 1st century AD, have been found in Britain. Most of the hoards comprise silver or gold Celtic coins known as staters, usually numbered in the tens or hundreds of coins, although the Hallaton Treasure contained over 5,000 silver and gold coins. In addition to hoards of coins, a number of hoards of gold torcs and other items of jewellery have been found, including the Snettisham Hoard, the Ipswich Hoard and the Stirling Hoard.

In September 2020, 1,300 Celtic gold coins were discovered at a location in eastern England, dated back between 40 and 50 A.D.

== Romano-British hoards ==
Hoards associated with the period of Romano-British culture when part of Great Britain was under the control of the Roman Empire, from AD 43 until about 410, as well as the subsequent Sub-Roman period up to the establishment of Anglo-Saxon kingdoms are the most numerous type of hoard found in Great Britain, and Roman coin hoards are particularly well represented, with over 1,200 known examples. In addition to hoards composed largely or entirely of coins, a smaller number of hoards, such as the Mildenhall Treasure and the Hoxne Hoard, include items of silver or gold tableware such as dishes, bowls, jugs and spoons, or items of silver or gold jewellery.

== Anglo-Saxon hoards ==
Anglo-Saxon hoards

Hoards associated with the Anglo-Saxon culture, from the 6th century to 1066, are relatively uncommon. Those that have been found include both hoards of coins and hoards of jewellery and metalwork such as sword hilts and crosses. The Staffordshire Hoard is the largest Anglo-Saxon hoard to have been found, comprising over 1,500 items of gold and silver. More Anglo-Saxon artefacts have been found in the context of grave burials than hoards in England. These include major finds from Sutton Hoo in Suffolk, Taplow in Buckinghamshire, Prittlewell, Mucking and Broomfield in Essex, and Crundale and Sarre in Kent.

Hoard	Image	Date	Place of discovery	Year of discovery	Current location	Contents
Appledore Hoard		Mid 11th century	Appledore; Kent; 51.031°N 0.790°E	1997	British Museum, London	490 pennies (1997); 12 silver pennies of Edward the Confessor (1998)
Bamburgh Hoard		Mid 9th century	Bamburgh; Northumberland; 55.604°N 1.722°W	1999 and 2004	Museum of Antiquities, Newcastle upon Tyne	384 base metal stycas Copper alloy fragments Bronze folding balance
Beeston Tor Hoard	Silver disc brooch from the Beeston Tor Hoard	9th century	Beeston Tor; Staffordshire; 53.08312°N 1.84470°W	1926	British Museum, London	49 pennies, two silver brooches, three finger rings and assorted fragments
Bolton Percy hoard	Bolton Percy hoard - York Museums Trust	9th century	Bolton Percy, North Yorkshire	1846, 1967	Yorkshire Museum	c.4000 Northumbrian pennies in a ceramic vessel and box
Brantham Hoard	Selection of coins from the Brantham Hoard	10th century	Brantham; Suffolk; 51.969°N 1.063°E	2003	Fitzwilliam Museum, Cambridge	90 silver pennies
Bucklesham Hoard		11th century	Bucklesham; Suffolk	2017	The hoard fetched £90,000 at auction	A hoard of 99 silver pennies, dated back to the reign of Aethelred II (978–1016), was discovered under the remains of a Saxon church demolished shortly after the Norman conquest of England in the 11th century.
Canterbury-St Martin's hoard	Replicas of gold coin-pendants from the Canterbury-St Martin's hoard	Late 6th or early 7th century	Canterbury; Kent; 51.278°N 1.094°E	1840s	World Museum, Liverpool	8 items, including 3 gold coins, and two pieces of jewellery
Crondall Hoard		Mid 7th century	Crondall; Hampshire; 51.230°N 0.862°W	1828	Ashmolean Museum, Oxford	100 small gold coins and 2 cloisonné pins
Harkirke (or Harkirk) Hoard		Early 10th century	Crosby; Merseyside; 53.502°N 3.020°W	1611	unknown (Note: The hoard was uncovered when preparing a burial ground in an area called Harkirke, or Harkirk (meaning "hoary or grey church"), which is now park land. The only record of the coins was a copperplate engraving of thirty five of them which was reproduced in a book by John Spelman, published in 1678.)	~300 Viking and Kufic coins
Hexham Hoard	Styca of Aethelred II from Hexham Hoard	Ninth century		1832	The hoard was uncovered by the sexton and a grave-digger.	Approximately 8000 Northumbrian pennies in a bronze bucket.
Ipswich Hoard (1863)		10th century	Ipswich; Suffolk; 52.059°N 1.156°E	1863		150 coins (75 now known)
West Norfolk Hoard		early 7th century	West Norfolk	1991		131 coins and four pieces of gold. Ten coins were found by a serving police officer who tried to sell them and was jailed for 16 months.
Kirkoswald Hoard		Mid 9th century	Kirkoswald, Cumbria	1808		542 Northumbrian stycas and one silver trefoil ornament
Lenborough Hoard		Mid 11th century	Lenborough, near Padbury; Buckinghamshire; 51.977°N 0.981°W	2014		5,251½ coins in a lead bucket, including coins of Ethelred the Unready and Canute
Pentney Hoard	The Pentney Treasure	Early 9th century	Pentney; Norfolk; 52.695°N 0.545°E	1978	British Museum, London	6 silver disc brooches
St Leonard's Place Hoard		Mid 9th century	York; York; 53.962°N 1.086°W	1842	Yorkshire Museum	c.10,000 Northumbrian stycas
Staffordshire Hoard	Selection of items from the Staffordshire Hoard	7th or 8th century	Hammerwich; Staffordshire; 52.655°N 1.907°W	2009	Birmingham Museum & Art Gallery; Potteries Museum & Art Gallery, Stoke-on-Trent	More than 1,500 items (about 5 kg (11 lb) of gold and 1.3 kg (2.9 lb) of silver), mostly sword fittings and decorative parts of weaponry, but also two gold crosses and an inscribed gold strip
Trewhiddle Hoard	Selection of items from the Trewhiddle Hoard	Late 9th century	Trewhiddle; Cornwall; 50.329°N 4.804°W	1774	British Museum, London	114 Anglo-Saxon coins, and various items of silverware, including a scourge, a chalice and a Celtic penannular brooch
West Yorkshire Hoard	Rings from the West Yorkshire Hoard	11th century	Leeds; West Yorkshire; 53.8°N 1.55°W	2008–2009	Leeds City Museum	5 items of 7th to 11th century gold jewellery (a cabochon ring, a filigree ring, a niello finger ring, a filigree and granular ring, and a piece of a cloisonné bracelet), an ingot of gold, and a lead spindle whorl.

== Pictish hoards ==
Pictish hoards

Hoards associated with Pictish culture, dating from the end of Roman occupation in the 5th century until about the 10th century, have been found in eastern and northern Scotland. These hoards often contain silver brooches and other items of jewellery.

Hoard	Image	Date	Place of discovery	Year of discovery	Current Location	Contents
Aberdeenshire hoard		4th to 6th century	Undisclosed location Aberdeenshire	2014		100 pieces of hacksilver, comprising late Roman coins and pieces of Roman and Pictish silver vessels, bracelets and brooches.
Broch of Burgar Hoard		late 8th century	Broch of Burgar, near Evie; Orkney; 59.131°N 3.134°W	1840	unknown	8 silver vessels several silver combs 5 or 6 silver hair pins 2 or 3 silver brooches several fragments of silver chains a large number of amber beads
Gaulcross Hoard		6th or early 7th century	Gaulcross, near Fordyce; Aberdeenshire; 57.663°N 2.779°W	late 1830s	Museum of Scotland, Edinburgh	Several silver hand pins (only one extant); 1 silver bracelet 1 silver chain several silver brooches (all lost)
Norrie's Law hoard	Silver plaque from the Norrie's Law Hoard	late 7th century	Norrie's Law, Largo; Fife; 56.255°N 2.953°W	1819	Museum of Scotland, Edinburgh	Nearly 12.5 kg of silver objects, of which all but 750 g were melted down. The 170 surviving objects include: 2 penannular brooches 2 oval plaques 3 or 4 hand-pins 2 spiral finger-rings 1 small vessel lid fragment of a 4th-century Roman spoon knife-handle mounts fragments of arm-bands various rod and chain fragments
St Ninian's Isle Treasure	Silver penannular brooch from the St Ninian's Isle Treasure	late 8th or early 9th century	St Ninian's Isle; Shetland; 59.971°N 1.342°W	1958	Museum of Scotland, Edinburgh	8 silver bowls 12 silver penannular brooches 2 silver chapes (part of scabbard that protects the point); 1 silver communion spoon 1 silver knife 1 silver pommel 3 silver cones

== Viking hoards ==
Hoards associated with the Viking culture in Great Britain, dating from the 9th to 11th centuries, are mostly found in northern England and Orkney, and frequently comprise a mixture of silver coins, silver jewellery and hacksilver that has been taken in loot, some coins originating from as far away as the Middle East.

Hoard	Image	Date	Place of discovery	Year of discovery	Current Location	Contents
Ainsbrook Hoard (Note: The Ainsbrook Hoard is named after the two men who discovered the hoard, Mark Ainsley and Geoffrey Bambrook; it was covered in a special episode of the Channel 4 programme Time Team, first broadcast 14 January 2008. The programme was sceptical about the Viking origins of the hoard, and the location of the find was initially kept secret "to avoid the location becoming known to unscrupulous 'nighthawk' detectorists".)		late 10th century	Thirsk; North Yorkshire; 54.233°N 1.343°W	2003	British Museum, London	~130 objects of gold, silver (including 10 Anglo-Saxon coins), copper alloy, lead, iron, and stone
Ashdon Hoard		Late 9th century	Ashdon	1984	Fitzwilliam Museum	71 silver pennies of Anglo-Saxon, Anglo-Scandinavian and Carolingian origins
Bedale Hoard	Bedale Hoard Group	early 10th century	Bedale; North Yorkshire; 54.29°N 1.59°W	2012	Yorkshire Museum, York	1 iron sword pommel with gold foil plaques, 4 gold hoops a sword hilt, 6 small gold rivets, 4 silver collars and neck-rings, 1 silver arm-ring, 1 fragment of a silver Permian ring, 1 silver penannular brooch, and 29 silver ingots.
Bossall-Flaxton hoard		early 10th century	between Bossall and Flaxton; North Yorkshire; 54.050°N 0.945°W	1807	British Museum, Yorkshire Museum, private collections.	Coins, bullion, arm-ring in a leaden box
Bryn Maelgwyn Hoard		early 11th century	near Deganwy Castle, Llandudno; Conwy; 53.305°N 3.815°W	1979	National Museum Cardiff	204 silver pennies of Cnut the Great
Cuerdale Hoard	Selection of items from the Cuerdale Hoard	early 10th century	Cuerdale, near Preston; Lancashire; 53.755°N 2.640°W	1840	British Museum, London, Ashmolean Museum, Oxford	8,600 items including silver coins and bullion
Eye Hoard		late 9th century	Eye; Herefordshire; 52.2705°N 2.7408°W	2015	Dispersed (Note: The Eye hoard was not declared to the Portable Antiquities Scheme, but was illegally sold to dealers by the finders, who were convicted of theft and concealing the find in 2019. Only 31 of the coins, a silver ingot, and three pieces of jewellery have been recovered.)	About 300 Anglo-Saxon silver and gold coins, some issued by Ceolwulf II of Mercia and some issued by Alfred of Wessex, together with one or more silver ingots, and some items of jewellery, including a late 6th-century crystal pendant, a gold arm-band and a gold finger ring
Furness Hoard		10th century	Furness; Cumbria; 54.20°N 3.15°W	2011	Dock Museum, Barrow-in-Furness	92 silver coins, including two Arabic dirhams, several silver ingots, and one silver bracelet.
Galloway Hoard		early 10th century	Kirkcudbrightshire	2014	Museum of Scotland, Edinburgh	over 100 gold and silver items, including armbands, a Christian cross, brooches, ingots and an exceptionally large Carolingian pot
Goldsborough Hoard		early 10th century	Goldsborough; North Yorkshire; 54.000°N 1.415°W	1859	British Museum, London	Fragments of Viking brooches and arm-rings, together with thirty-nine coins
Huxley Hoard	5 flattened bracelets from the Huxley Hoard	late 9th to 10th century	Huxley, Cheshire; Cheshire; 53.147°N 2.733°W	2004	World Museum, Liverpool	22 silver pieces (including 20 flattened bracelets)
Herefordshire hoard		late 9th to 10th century	Eye, near Leominster; Herefordshire	2015		Over 300 coins, silver ingot, gold jewellery. The hoard was initially split and sold. Only 31 coins remain.
Penrith Hoard	Selection of items from the Penrith Hoard	early 10th century	Newbiggin Moor, near Penrith; Cumbria; 54.650°N 2.578°W	1785–1989	British Museum, London	A number of silver penannular brooches
Silverdale Hoard	Coins, jewellery, ingots and hacksilver from the Silverdale Hoard	early 10th century	Silverdale; Lancashire; 54.17°N 2.83°W	2011	Museum of Lancashire, Preston, Lancaster City Museum	201 silver objects inside a box made from a sheet of lead; comprising 27 coins (Anglo-Saxon, Anglo-Viking, Frankish and Islamic), 10 arm rings, 2 finger rings, 14 ingots, 6 brooch fragments, 1 wire braid, and 141 pieces of hacksilver.
Skaill Hoard		mid 10th century	Bay of Skaill; Orkney; 59.050°N 3.337°W	1858	National Museum of Scotland, Edinburgh	Over 100 items, including bracelets, brooches, hacksilver, and ingots
Storr Rock Hoard		10th century	Isle of Skye	1891	National Museum of Scotland, Edinburgh	A collection of silver coins dating from the 10th century
Talnotrie Hoard	Lead weight, Talnotrie hoard	late 9th century	near Talntrie	1912	National Museums Scotland	Jewellery, metal-working material and coins
Vale of York Hoard (Harrogate Hoard)	The Harrogate Hoard before cleaning, with the coins still in the pot	early 10th century	near Harrogate; North Yorkshire; 53.99°N 1.54°W	2007	British Museum, London; Yorkshire Museum, York	More than 617 silver coins, and 65 other items, including silver and gold armrings, neckrings and brooch fragments, as well as hacksilver, all placed inside a 9th-century gilt-silver vessel
Warton Hoard		early 10th century	Warton, near Carnforth; Lancashire; 54.147°N 2.766°W	1997	Lancaster City Museum, Lancaster	3 silver dirhems of the Samanid dynasty 6 pieces of cut silver weighing 116.49 g (4.109 oz)
Watlington Hoard		late 9th century	Watlington; Oxfordshire; 51.645°N 1.000°W	2015	Ashmolean Museum, Oxford	About 210 silver coins from the reigns of Alfred the Great of Wessex and Ceolwulf II of Mercia, together with 15 silver ingots, 6 silver arm rings, 2 neck ring fragments, and one small piece of hack gold

== Later Medieval hoards ==
Hoards dating to the later medieval period, from 1066 to about 1500, mostly comprise silver pennies, in some cases amounting to many thousands of coins, although the Fishpool Hoard contains over a thousand gold coins.

Hoard	Image	Date	Place of discovery	Year of discovery	Current Location	Contents
Abergavenny Hoard	Coins from the Abergavenny Hoard	late 11th century	Abergavenny; Monmouthshire; 51.824°N 3.017°W	2002	National Museum Cardiff	199 silver pennies of Edward the Confessor and William the Conqueror
Baschurch Hoard		mid 13th century	Baschurch; Shropshire; 52.792°N 2.854°W	2007–2008	Shrewsbury Museum and Art Gallery	191 long cross pennies of Henry III of England, 1 penny of Alexander III of Scotland, and some coin fragments
Beverley Hoard		mid 13th century	Beverley; East Yorkshire; 53.845°N 0.427°W	2000	British Museum, London	448 short cross pennies 27 cut half pennies
Bootham Hoard		15th century	York; North Yorkshire; 53.967°N 1.095°W	1953	Yorkshire Museum, York	908 silver coins of the fourteenth and fifteenth centuries.
Chesterton Lane Hoard		mid 14th century	Chesterton Lane, Cambridge; Cambridgeshire; 52.211°N 0.115°E	2000	Fitzwilliam Museum, Cambridge	9 gold coins 1806 silver coins
Chew Valley Hoard		mid 11th century	Chew Valley; Somerset; 51.350°N 2.600°W	2019		2,528 silver coins, including 1,236 coins of Harold II and 1,310 coins of William I
Colchester Hoard (1902)		mid 13th century	High Street, Colchester; Essex; 51.890°N 0.903°E	1902	British Museum, London and Colchester Museums, Colchester	11,000 – 12,000 silver pennies in a lead canister
Colchester Hoard (1969)	Coins from the Colchester Hoard	late 13th century	High Street, Colchester; Essex; 51.890°N 0.903°E	1969	British Museum, London and Colchester Museums, Colchester	over 14,000 silver pennies of Henry III in a lead canister
Cwm Nant Col Hoard		early 16th century	near Llanbedr; Gwynedd; 52.820°N 4.101°W	1918	National Museum Cardiff	1 late 13th or early 14th century copper alloy aquamanile in the shape of a stag, 1 5th century copper alloy ewer, 1 copper alloy tray, 1 bronze cauldron, 2 bronze skillets, 1 woodman's iron axe, and iron firedog fragments
Fauld Hoard		early 15th century	Fauld, Tutbury; Staffordshire; 52.84°N 1.73°W	2000	Potteries Museum & Art Gallery, Stoke-on-Trent	114 silver groats
Fishpool Hoard	Coins and jewellery from the Fishpool Hoard	mid 15th century	Ravenshead; Nottinghamshire; 53.08°N 1.17°W	1966	British Museum, London	1,237 gold coins 8 pieces of jewellery 2 lengths of gold chain
Fillongley Hoard		early 13th century	Fillongley; Warwickshire; 52.482°N 1.588°W	1997	Warwickshire Museum, Warwick	2 silver brooches silver finger ring 127 short-cross pennies
Gayton Hoard		late 12th century	Gayton; Northamptonshire; 52.170°N 0.993°W	1998–1999	Ashmolean Museum, Oxford	308 silver pennies 7 fragments
Glenluce Hoard		late 15th century	Glenluce sand-dunes Wigtownshire; 54.850°N 4.883°W	1956		2 English silver coins 10 Scottish silver coins 99 Scottish billon coins 1 Scottish copper farthing
Gorefield Hoard		early 14th century	Gorefield; Cambridgeshire; 52.683°N 0.092°E	1998	British Museum, London; Wisbech & Fenland Museum, Fitzwilliam Museum, Cambridge	1,084 silver pennies, halfpennies and farthings
Llanddona Hoard		early 14th century	Llanddona; Anglesey; 53.294°N 4.139°W	1999, 2005–2006	returned to finder	970 silver pennies
Piddletrenthide Hoard (2008)	Medieval silver coins from the Piddletrenthide Hoard	1400–1412	Piddletrenthide, Dorset; 50.800°N 2.425°W	2008		293 Medieval silver coins, comprising 272 complete pennies, 2 broken pennies, 14 half groats, and 4 groats, found in a fragmentary pottery vessel.
Reigate Hoard		mid 15th century	Reigate; Surrey; 51.230°N 0.188°W	1990	dispersed	135 gold nobles, half nobles and quarters 6,566 silver groats
Rhoneston Hoard		late 15th century	Rhoneston, near Dumfries; Dumfriesshire; 55.154°N 3.708°W	1961		7 English silver coins 6 Scottish silver coins 70 Scottish billon coins
Roslin Hoard		early 14th century	Roslin; Midlothian	2019	National Museums of Scotland, Edinburgh	
Rumney Castle Hoard		late 13th century	Rumney Castle; Cardiff; 51.50342°N 3.13970°W	1981		63 silver pennies from the reign of Edward I
Ryther Hoard		late 15th century	Ryther; North Yorkshire; 53.845°N 1.168°W	1992	Yorkshire Museum, York	812 silver coins, mostly English groats, half-groats and pennies dating from the reigns of Edward I/II through Henry VII, in an unglazed drinking jug.
Tealby Hoard		late 12th century	Tealby; Lincolnshire; 53.400°N 0.265°W	1807	5,127 melted down at the Tower of London; rest dispersed.	5,731 silver pennies of the reign of Henry II (dated 1158–1180), in a glazed earthenware pot.
Tutbury Hoard		early 14th century	Tutbury; Staffordshire; 52.85°N 1.69°W	1831	dispersed	360,000 silver coins (the largest hoard of coins ever discovered in Britain)
Twynholm Hoard		early 14th century	Twynholm; Dumfries and Galloway; 54.863°N 4.090°W	2013		322 silver coins dating from 1249 to 1325, including Scottish coins from the reigns of Alexander III and John Balliol, and English coins from the reigns of Edward I, Edward II, and Edward III
Wainfleet Hoard	Pot and some coins from the Wainfleet Hoard	late 12th century	Wainfleet; Lincolnshire; 53.108°N 0.237°E	1990	British Museum, London	380 silver pennies and 3 halfpennies in a green-glazed ceramic bottle

== Post-Medieval hoards ==
Most hoards from the post-medieval period, later than 1500, date to the period of the English Civil War (1642–1651), from which time over 200 hoards are known.

Hoard	Image	Date	Place of discovery	Year of discovery	Current Location	Contents
Abbotsham Hoard		mid 17th century	Abbotsham; Devon; 51.016°N 4.250°W	2001	Bideford Museum	9 gold coins 425 silver coins
Ackworth Hoard		mid 17th century	High Ackworth; West Yorkshire; 53.655°N 1.335°W	2011	Pontefract Museum	52 gold coins, 539 silver coins, and a gold ring inscribed "When this you see, remember me", in a clay Wrenthorpe ware pot.
Alderwasley Hoard	Alderwasley Hoard	mid 17th century	Alderwasley; Derbyshire; 53.073°N 1.524°W	1971	Derby Museum and Art Gallery	907g of silver clippings from coins issued by Philip and Mary (1553–1558), Elizabeth I (1558–1603), James I (1603–1625), and Charles I (1625–1649), stored in an earthenware jar. (Note: The Alderwasley Hoard was found a few metres away from the site of another hoard of clippings in a ceramic jar, weighing 3.6kg, which was discovered in 1846, and subsequently melted down to make silver altarware for the Alderwasley church.)
Asthall Hoard	Asthall Hoard	early 16th century	Asthall; Oxfordshire; 51.80°N 1.58°W	2007	Ashmolean Museum, Oxford	210 English gold angels and half-angel coins dating to the period 1470–1526
Bishops Waltham Hoard	Fake French coins from the Bishops Waltham Hoard	early 18th century	Bishops Waltham; Hampshire; 50.954°N 1.213°W	?		7,083 forged French 30-denier coins dated 1711
Bitterley Hoard	Excavation of the Bitterley Hoard	mid 17th century	Bitterley; Shropshire; 52.395°N 2.645°W	2011		1 gold coin and 137 silver coins (half crowns and shillings) with a leather purse in a tyg
Breckenbrough Hoard	Coins of the Breckenbrough Hoard	mid 17th century	Breckenbrough; North Yorkshire; 54.246480°N 1.4271327°W	June 1985	Yorkshire Museum	30 gold and 1552 silver coins, within a ceramic Ryedale ware vessel, and two receipts for cheese.
Cheapside Hoard		late 16th to early 17th century	Cheapside, London	1912	Museum of London, British Museum, London, Victoria and Albert Museum, London	Over 400 pieces of Elizabethan and Jacobean jewellery
Deal Hoard		mid 16th century	Deal; Kent; 51.223°N 1.401°E	2000	British Museum, London	191 base silver coins within a linen bag inside a pot
Ellerby Area Hoard	The Ellerby Area Hoard	18th century	Ellerby; East Riding of Yorkshire; 53.82°N 0.22°W5	2020	Dispersed into private collections	266 gold coins within a stoneware vessel.
Hackney Hoard	Gold double-eagle coins from the Hackney Hoard	mid 20th century (1940)	Hackney; London; 51.571°N 0.081°W	2007	British Museum, London	80 American Double eagle gold coins minted between 1854 and 1913
Haddiscoe Hoard		mid 17th century	Haddiscoe; Norfolk; 52.525°N 1.620°E	2003	Elizabethan House Museum, Great Yarmouth	316 silver coins
Ham Green Hoard		mid 17th century (early 1660s)	Ham Green; Worcestershire; 52.525°N 1.620°E	1981	Museums Worcestershire (The Commandery)	86 silver coins (mostly shillings and sixpences) in a salt glazed stoneware bottle which was buried beneath the floor of the pantry in a cottage, the coins mostly dating to the Civil War period. Coins minted from 1554 to 1661/1662.
Hartford Hoard	Silver groats and earthenware pot from the Hartford Hoard	early 16th century	Hartford; Cambridgeshire; 52.337°N 0.159°W	1964	British Museum, London	1,108 silver groats from the reigns of Edward IV, Henry VI, Richard III, and Henry VII, and double patards of Charles the Bold
Lincoln Spanish-American gold hoards	6 gold coins discovered in 2010	early 19th century	North Kesteven; Lincolnshire; 53.185°N 0.59°W	1928; 2010		24 Spanish-American gold 8-escudo coins minted between 1790 and 1801 (18 discovered in 1928, and 6 discovered in 2010)
Lindsey Hoard		15th to 17th century	Lindsey; Suffolk	2020		1,061 silver coins were found on land belonging to the Lindsey Rose pub, dating back between the 15th to 17th centuries.
Mason Hoard (Note: The Mason Hoard is named after its discover, Richard Mason, a builder who found the jug when working on an extension to a modern house in Lindisfarne; he did not realize the jug contained any coins until 2011. The Mason hoard was found at exactly the same location that the 1962 Short Hoard had been found at.)	Jug and 17 coins constituting the Mason Hoard	mid 16th century	Lindisfarne; Northumberland; 55.671°N 1.801°W	2003	Great North Museum, Newcastle upon Tyne	10 gold and 7 silver coins, including 11 English coins dating from the reigns of Henry VI through Elizabeth I and 6 coins from France, Saxony, the Netherlands and the Papal States, in a mid-16th century German jug.
Middleham Hoard	Selection of coins from the Middleham Hoard held at the Yorkshire Museum	mid 17th century	Middleham; North Yorkshire; 54.2797°N 1.8399°W	1993	Dispersed amongst various museums and private collections, including Yorkshire Museum, York	5,099 silver coins, comprising 4,772 English coins of Edward VI through Charles I, 31 Scottish coins, 10 Irish coins, 245 coins from the Spanish Netherlands, and 2 coins from the Spanish New World. The coins were found in three pots from two different pits, and were probably deposited at slightly different dates.
Mitton Hoard	The Mitton Hoard on display at Clitheroe Castle	15th century	Great Mitton; Lancashire; 53.846°N 2.442°W	2009	Clitheroe Castle Museum, Lancashire	11 silver coins or fragments, including one or two from France.
Nether Stowey Hoard	Silverware from the Nether Stowey Hoard	mid 17th century	Nether Stowey; Somerset; 51.152°N 3.153°W	2008	Somerset County Museum, Taunton	Silverware, including four spoons, a goblet and a bell salt, in an incomplete earthenware vessel
Short Hoard (Note: The Short Hoard is named after its discover, Alan Short, a builder who found the jug when working on a modern house in Lindisfarne. The Mason Hoard was found at the same location in 2003.)		mid 16th century	Lindisfarne; Northumberland; 55.671°N 1.801°W	1962		50 English silver sixpences and groats, the latest dating to 1562 during the reign of Elizabeth II, in a mid-16th century German jug.
Tidenham Hoard		mid 17th century	Tidenham; Gloucestershire; 51.66°N 2.64°W	1999	Chepstow Museum	1 gold coin 117 silver coins
Totnes Hoard		mid 17th century	Totnes; Devon; 50.432°N 3.684°W	1930s	Totnes Museum	176 silver coins of England, Scotland, Ireland and Spanish Netherlands
Tregwynt Hoard		mid 17th century	Tregwynt; Pembrokeshire; 51.970°N 5.073°W	1996	National Museum Wales, Cardiff	33 gold coins 467 silver coins a gold ring
Warkworth Hoard		early 16th century	Warkworth; Northumberland; 55.340°N 1.6120°W	2017	Private ownership	128 coins, comprising groat and half-groat coins from the reigns of Edward IV (r. 1461–1470 and 1471–1483) and Henry VII (r. 1485–1509), as well as nine coins issued by Charles the Bold when he was Duke of Burgundy from 1467 to 1477.
Warmsworth Hoard		early 17th century	Warmsworth; South Yorkshire; 53.498°N 1.182°W	1999	Doncaster Museum	122 silver coins pottery fragments bronze alloy spoon
Weston-sub-Edge Hoard	Weston-sub-Edge Hoard on display at Corinium Museum	mid 17th century	Weston-sub-Edge, Gloucestershire; 52.068°N 1.817°W	1981	Corinium Museum, Cirencester	307 silver and 2 gold coins.

== See also ==
- List of hoards in Ireland
- List of hoards in the Channel Islands
- List of hoards in the Isle of Man
- List of metal detecting finds
