= Bitterley (disambiguation) =

Bitterley may refer to:

- Bitterley, a village in Shropshire, England.
- John Bitterley (died c.1396), member of Parliament for Salisbury
- Listed buildings in Bitterley
- Bitterley Hoard, a post-medieval coin hoard
- Church of St Mary, Bitterley
