= Huxley Hoard =

Hoard of viking jewellery

Coordinates: 53.147°N 2.733°W

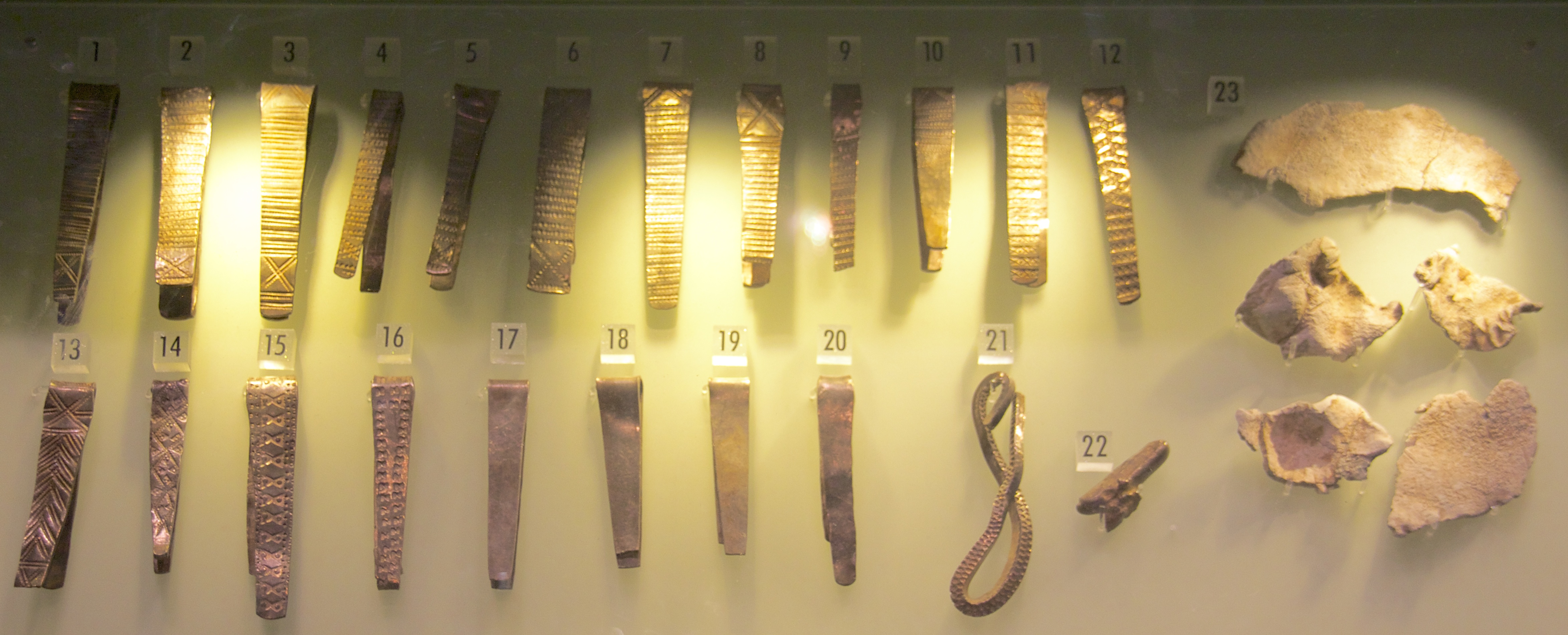
- The Huxley Hoard at the Museum of Liverpool
- Material: Silver
- Period/culture: Viking
- Discovered: Huxley, Cheshire, 2004
- Present location: Museum of Liverpool

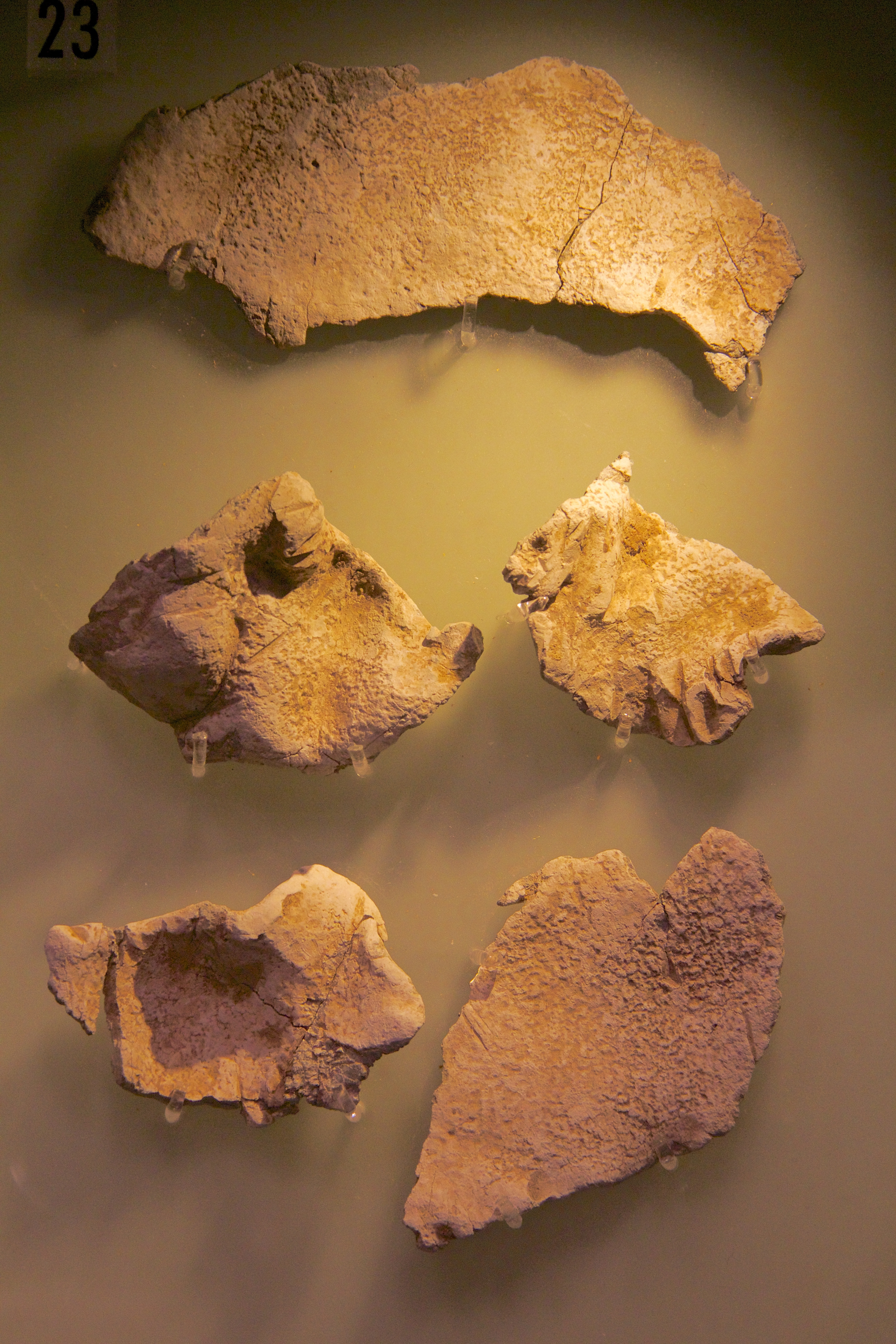
Lead fragments found with the Huxley Hoard

The Huxley Hoard is a hoard of Viking jewellery from around 900-910 found buried near Huxley, Cheshire, England. It consists of 21 silver bracelets, one silver ingot, and 39 lead fragments, weighing around 1.5 kilograms (3.3 lb) in total. The bracelets might have been produced by Norse settlers in Dublin and possibly buried for safekeeping by Viking refugees settling in Cheshire and the Wirral in the early 900's. It was discovered by Steve Reynoldson in November 2004 after he found fragments of lead 30 centimetres (12 in) underground using a metal detector.

The bracelets were folded flat, sixteen decorated by punched patterns, six with crosses stamped in their centre, and another six with centre cross and one at each end. Two have lattice patterns, one an hourglass stamp around the edge, one chevrons with central and end crosses, and one (found as a twisted bar) a zig-zag pattern; the remaining four are plain. The lead fragments suggest the hoard could have been buried either in a lead sheet or a lead-lined wood box.

One of a cluster of hoards found in the Chester area, it was held by the British Museum until early 2007 before making a July 2007 debut at the Merseyside Maritime Museum. A Heritage Lottery Fund grant of £45,000 enabled its purchase by joint owners Grosvenor Museum, Cheshire Museums Service and National Museums Liverpool, who have it on display at the Museum of Liverpool. It was the subject of a book published by the National Museums Liverpool in 2010.

== See also ==
- List of hoards in Britain
