= Listed buildings in Bitterley =

Bitterley is a civil parish in Shropshire, England. It contains 42 listed buildings that are recorded in the National Heritage List for England. Of these, one is listed at Grade I, the highest of the three grades, ten are at Grade II*, the middle grade, and the others are at Grade II, the lowest grade. The parish contains the villages of Bitterley, Cleeton St Mary, and Middleton and smaller settlements, and is otherwise entirely rural. Most of the listed buildings are houses, farmhouses and farm buildings, many dating from the 15th–17th centuries, the majority of them originally timber framed. The other listed buildings include two churches, a churchyard cross, a former manor house, a country house with associated structures, a milestone, two bridges, a lychgate, and a telephone kiosk.

== Key ==
Grade	Criteria
I	Buildings of exceptional interest, sometimes considered to be internationally important
II*	Particularly important buildings of more than special interest
II	Buildings of national importance and special interest

== Buildings ==
Name and location	Photograph	Date	Notes	Grade
Middleton Chapel; 52.39206°N 2.67731°W		12th century	The church, which is Norman in style, was restored in 1857, with the addition of a porch and a bellcote. It is built in stone with a tile roof, and consists of a nave, a north porch, and a chancel. At the west end is a buttress containing a window and rising to a single bellcote with a canopy.	II*
St Mary's Church, Bitterley; 52.39216°N 2.63218°W		Late 13th century	The church was altered in the 17th century, and heavily restored in 1880–81 by Thomas Nicholson. It is in Early English style, and built in stone and has a tile roof with a coped gable. The church consists of a nave, a south porch, a chancel, and a west tower. The tower has three stages. The lower two stages are in stone with clasping buttresses, and the top stage is a timber framed belfry with a broach spire. The porch is timber framed on a stone plinth.	II*
House southeast of Brook House; 52.39363°N 2.67426°W	—	Medieval	The house was altered in the 17th and 19th centuries. The earliest parts are timber framed with wattle and daub infill on a stone plinth, the later part is in brick, and the roof is tiled. The earlier part has three bays and is cruck framed, and the house has one storey and an attic. The windows include a mullion window, casement windows, and a dormer.	II*
Churchyard cross 52.39201°N 2.63205°W		14th century	The cross is in the churchyard of St Mary's Church, and was restored in 1899. It is in ashlar atone, and consists of a tabernacle head on a tapered octagonal shaft. This stands on a square plinth with an octagonal chamfered top, on four hexagonal steps. The tabernacle has four gabled niches containing carved figures depicting the Nativity and the Crucifixion. The cross is also a Scheduled Monument.	I
Brookhouse Cottage; 52.39416°N 2.67419°W	—	15th century	Originally two cottages that were extended in the 17th century, they have been combined into one dwelling. It is timber framed with rendered infill on a plinth of brick and stone, and partly weatherboarded. There is a single storey, an attic and a cellar, the original part had three bays, and the extension added two bays. The windows are casements, there are dormers, a bay window, a doorway with a canopy, and a cellar door. In the earlier part are three full cruck trusses.	II
Cleeton Court; 52.41179°N 2.58048°W	—	15th century	A farmhouse, later a private house, it was altered and extended in each of the following centuries. At its core in the south range is a 15th-century two-bay open hall. This range has three bays, a four-bay cross-wing was added at right angles, and later the angle was infilled with two further wings. The house is in stone with tiled roofs, and has two storeys and attics. On the front is a lean-to porch, to the right is a mullioned and transomed window with a keyed lintel, and most of the other windows are casements.	II*
Upper Ledwyche Farmhouse and horse engine-house 52.40902°N 2.65724°W		Late 15th century	A staircase wing was added to the house in the 17th century and in the 19th century it was refronted and rear wings added. The original core of the house is timber framed, the extensions are in brick and stone, and the roof is partly tiled and partly slated. The main front is in brick and has two storeys and an attic, and four bays. The windows are sashes, and there are four half-dormers; at the rear the windows are casements. At the rear in the angle between the main block and the rear wings is a horse engine-house in stone with a hipped slate roof.	II*
Hall Farmhouse; 52.37473°N 2.65189°W	—	16th century	The farmhouse was altered and extended in the 19th century. The older part is timber framed with brick or rendered infill on a stone plinth, the later parts are in stone or polychrome brick, and the roof is tiled. The original part has a T-shaped plan with a range and a cross-wing, and later extensions. There are two storeys and an attic. In the older part the windows are mullioned or mullioned and transomed, and in the later parts they are casements, some in dormers.	II
Henley Farmhouse; 52.38428°N 2.67604°W	—	Late 16th century	The farmhouse is partly in brick and partly timber framed with rendered infill on a brick plinth, and has a tile roof. The original three-bay range was extended by two bays in the 18th century, and the 17th-century cross-wing to the north was also extended in the 18th century. There are two storeys with an attic and a cellar. The doorway has a moulded lintel and a canopy. Most of the windows are casements, and some are mullioned.	II
Bitterley Court; 52.39155°N 2.63195°W		Late 16th or early 17th century	A manor house that was remodelled in 1768–69 by Thomas Farnolls Pritchard. It has rendered walls, and roofs of tile and slate with coped gables. There are two storeys, attics and cellars, and the house has an H-shaped plan. The south front has seven bays, the middle three bays projecting under a pediment with modillion eaves and a roundel in the tympanum. The doorway has an architrave and a flat canopy above which is a carved crest, and the windows are sashes with some blind windows. There are three gables in both returns.	II*
Brook House; 52.39447°N 2.67542°W	—	Early 17th century (probable)	The house was extended in the early 18th century. The earlier part is timber framed on a stone plinth, the later part is in brick on a brick plinth with bands, and the roofs are tiled, the 18th-century parts with ornamental bargeboards and finials. There are two storeys attic and cellars, and the house has an H-shaped plan. The original part consists of a three-bays range with a three-bay cross-wing and an outshut, and the later part is an extension and another cross-wing. The windows in the earlier part are casements and in the later part they are sashes.	II*
Crowleasowes; 52.40132°N 2.66723°W	—	Early 17th century	A farmhouse that was extended by the addition of a wing in the 19th century. The earlier part is in brick, the later part in stone, and the roof is tiled with brick-coped gables. There are two storeys and attics, the original part has two parallel gables, and the extension added another parallel gable. The windows in the earlier part are mullioned, one also with a transom, and in the later part are casement windows. The doorway has an elliptical moulded arch, rusticated pilasters, and a brick pediment, and to the right is a pilaster with a ball finial.	II*
The Quarry; 52.39104°N 2.67852°W	—	Early 17th century	The farmhouse was extended in the 18th century. It is partly timber framed with brick infill and some weatherboarding on a stone plinth, and partly in stone with quoins. There are two storeys, an attic and a cellar, and a T-shaped plan consisting of a main range, a cross-wing to the south, and an extension to the south. The windows are casements, some in dormers.	II
Outbuildings northwest of Brook House; 52.39454°N 2.67570°W	—	17th century	The outbuildings, which were extended in the 18th century, are agricultural buildings with a kiln at the far end. They are partly timber framed, partly in brick, and partly in stone, and the roof is tiled. There is a single storey with a loft, and the buildings form an L-shaped plan, with five bays and various openings.	II
Duce's Cottage; 52.39272°N 2.64563°W	—	17th century	The house was remodelled and extended in the 19th century. It is timber framed with rendered infill, the extensions are in brick, and the roof is tiled. The house consists of a two-bay range with a cross-wing at the left. There is one storey and an attic, and lean-to extensions on the front and back. The windows are mullioned or mullioned and transomed, and there is a gabled dormer on the front. The doorway has a chamfered surround and a gabled canopy.	II
Lower Court Farmhouse; 52.39325°N 2.64706°W	—	17th century	The farmhouse was altered in the 18th and 19th centuries, and has been divided into two dwellings. It is in stone and brick and has a tile roof, with two storeys, and an attic and a cellar. The house consists of a north–south range and a west cross-wing. There are two porches, one with ornate framing. Most of the windows are casements, one window is mullioned, and another is mullioned and transomed.	II
Malt House, Miller's House and Ledwyche House; 52.38401°N 2.67611°W	—	17th century	A watermill, later altered and converted into three dwellings. It is in stone and brick and has a tile roof, and consists of two ranges between which is a cross-wing. There are two storeys with attics, and most of the windows are casements. The building contains two steel overshot waterwheels.	II*
Outbuildings, Meesons Farm; 52.40984°N 2.67512°W	—	17th century	Alterations were made to the farm buildings in the 18th and 19th centuries. They are in a variety of materials, including timber framing with brick infill, weatherboarding, and polychrome brick. There are two range at right angles, one consisting of a cow-house with hayloft above, and the other a three-bay barn, a cow-house and stables. They contain doorways, loft doors and diamond-pattern vent holes.	II
Three Ways Cottage; 52.39292°N 2.64535°W	—	17th century	The house is partly timber framed and partly in brick, and has a weatherboarded rear wing. There is one storey, an attic and a cellar, a front of two bays, and a rear wing. The windows are casements, and in the attic are two gabled dormers.	II
East barn, Middleton Court; 52.39191°N 2.67648°W	—	Late 17th or 18th century	The barn, which was refurbished in the 19th century, is timber framed with brick infill on a stone and brick plinth, and has partial underbuilding in red brick, and a tile roof. There are two levels and five bays, and there are doorways on the east and west fronts.	II
South barn, Middleton Court; 52.39186°N 2.67689°W	—	Late 17th or 18th century	The barn, which was refurbished in the 19th century, is timber framed with brick infill on a brick plinth, and has partial underbuilding in red and blue brick, and a tile roof. There are two levels and five bays, and it contains two stable doors.	II
Stables, Brook House; 52.39445°N 2.67499°W	—	1726	The stables, later used for other purposes, were extended in the 19th century. The building is in brick on a stone plinth with a moulded brick cap, and has a tile roof with brick-coped gables. There are two storeys and an attic, and a front of bays. It contains windows with segmental heads, and other openings including stable doors and dove holes, and there is a stone tablet with initials and the date.	II
Old Rectory; 52.39276°N 2.64391°W	—	c. 1740	The rectory, later a private house, is in brick partly on a stone plinth, with bands, dentil eaves at the front, and a roof of tile with coped gables at the front, and of slate and hipped at the rear. There are three storeys and five bays. Most of the windows are sashes, some are casements, and all have moulded surrounds and segmental heads. The doorway at the front has a fanlight, and the rear doorway has panelled pilasters, recessed spandrels, a cornice, and a canopy.	II
Henley Hall and wall, balustrade and steps 52.38092°N 2.67532°W	—	Mid 18th century	A country house that was later altered and extended at both ends, including a billiard room extension in 1892 by Norman Shaw. It is in brick, and has a slate roof with a brick parapet. The house has mainly three storeys, and a front of 14 bays. The central porch has a pair of Tuscan columns carrying a Doric entablature with an open pediment, and the doorway has pilasters, side lights, an architrave, and a fanlight, and at the rear is a similar portico. Most of the windows are sashes, and some are mullioned and transomed. To the south is a balustraded terrace with walls, gateways, and steps.	II*
Dovecote, Henley Hall; 52.38068°N 2.67381°W	—	18th century	The dovecote is in red brick on a plinth of brick and stone. It has an octagonal plan, an octahedral tile roof with a lantern and a finial. On the east side is a doorway with a segmental arch, and on the west wall is a sundial.	II
Gates and screen, Henley Hall; 52.38332°N 2.67441°W		18th century	The gates, gate standards, and screens are in wrought iron. There is a central pair of gates with standards, flanked by screen walls containing pedestrian gates, also with standards, and the walls have end standards.	II
Orangery, Henley Hall; 52.38077°N 2.67605°W	—	18th century	The orangery is in red brick with a hipped slate roof. It has one storey and a front of five bays, the outer bays canted. The central bays have French windows, and the outer bays contain sash windows. Between the windows are pilasters with moulded stone bases and capitals, and there is a continuous architrave. On the top is a central pediment and a canted cornice with ball finials.	II
Meesons Farmhouse; 52.40981°N 2.67550°W	—	18th century	The farmhouse was altered and extended in the 19th century. It is partly in brick with dentil eaves, partly in stone, and partly timber framed, and has a tile roof hipped to the north. There are two storeys, four bays, and single-storey gabled extensions at both ends. Some windows are mullioned and transomed with deep brick segmental-arched lintels, others are casements with segmental heads, and there are two hipped dormers.	II
Bitterley House; 52.39304°N 2.64359°W	—	Late 18th century	A brick house with bands, dentil eaves, and a tile roof with coped gables. There are two storeys and attics, a front of three bays, a single-bay two-storey wing to the right, and a two-storey rear wing. The central doorway has a chamfered surround and a double fanlight. The windows are sashes, some with segmental heads, in the attic are two dormers, and in the left gable end is an attic roundel.	II
Former stable block, Henley Hall; 52.38120°N 2.67429°W	—	Late 18th century	The stable block has been converted for residential use. It is in brick on a plinth and has a hipped tiled roof. There are two storeys and a front of five bays. The central bay projects and contains a carriage entrance in an arched recess with a roundel in each spandrel. Above is a gable with a pediment containing a clock face, and on the roof is an open cupola with octagonal arcading. Most of the windows are sashes, some are casements, and others are mullioned and transomed.	II
Milestone; 52.38154°N 2.63628°W	—	Late 18th century	The milestone is on the north side of the A4117 road. It is in sandstone and has a rectangular shape and a rounded head. The milestone is inscribed with the distance in miles to Ludlow.	II
Park House; 52.37703°N 2.67648°W	—	Late 18th century	The building is in the grounds of Henley Hall. It is in brick with a string course, and the roof is tiled with a coped gable at the front and is hipped elsewhere. It has a single storey with an attic and a cellar, and a square plan. The building contains windows with lattice glazing, a half-dormer with a moulded surround, and a cellar doorway with a segmental head.	II
Outbuilding south of Brook House; 52.39434°N 2.67543°W	—	Late 18th or early 19th century	A privy, later a store, it is in stone and has a pyramidal tiled roof. There is one storey, a square plan, a doorway, and a single-light window.	II
Left hand gatepier, East Lodge; 52.40485°N 2.67531°W	—	Late 18th or early 19th century	The gate pier is in sandstone and has a rusticated shaft on a two-tier moulded plinth. At the top is a moulded cornice, two blocking courses, and a ball finial.	II
Right hand gatepier, East Lodge; 52.40487°N 2.67519°W		Late 18th or early 19th century	The gate pier is in sandstone and has a rusticated shaft on a two-tier moulded plinth. At the top is a moulded cornice, two blocking courses, and a ball finial.	II
Ledwyche Bridge; 52.36671°N 2.68435°W	—	Early to mid 19th century	The bridge carries Squirrel Lane over the Ledwyche Brook. It is in stone and brick, and consists of a single segmental arch. The bridge has a brick string course, a stone keystone and springer, a parapet with stone coping, and end piers.	II
Sundial, Henley Hall; 52.38079°N 2.67576°W	—	19th century (probable)	The sundial is in the rose garden to the south of the hall. It is in ashlar stone and consists of a Corinthian column in a circular socket stone with four fluted colonnettes. On the top is a cube with a dial and a metal gnomon on each face. On the top is a weathervane with a heraldic bird.	II
Lychgate, Middleton Chapel; 52.39212°N 2.67773°W		Mid 19th century	The lychgate has an oak frame, a roof of sandstone slates, and moulded ridge tiles. On the top is wooden a Greek cross.	II
Bridge near Brook House; 52.39484°N 2.67726°W	—	1857	The bridge carries a road over the Ledwyche Brook. It is in polychrome brick, and consists of a single segmental arch, the parapet walls linking with retaining approach walls. There are piers at the ends and in the centre that have pyramidal copings. In the centre pier is a stone inscribed with the date and initials.	II
East Lodge; 52.40499°N 2.67518°W		1857	The lodge is at the eastern entrance to the grounds of Downton Hall. It is in stone with a hipped slate roof, there are two storeys and a basement, and the house consists of an octagonal block with a north wing. Above the ground floor of the octagon is a pentice roof on wooden posts forming an arcade. The windows are casements, and there is a bay window and a gabled dormer on the west front.	II
St Mary's Church, Cleeton St Mary; 52.40448°N 2.57351°W		1878	The church was designed by Thomas Nicholson in Early English style. It is built in stone and has a tiled roofs with coped gables and finials. The church consists of a nave, a south porch, a chancel with a north organ chamber and vestry, and a west tower embraced by the nave. The tower has a single stage and a shingled broach spire, and the windows are lancets.	II
Telephone kiosk 52.39296°N 2.64354°W		1935	A K6 type telephone kiosk, designed by Giles Gilbert Scott. Constructed in cast iron with a square plan and a dome, it has three unperforated crowns in the top panels.	II
