= Bitterley =

Village in Shropshire, England

Coordinates: 52.393°N 2.644°W

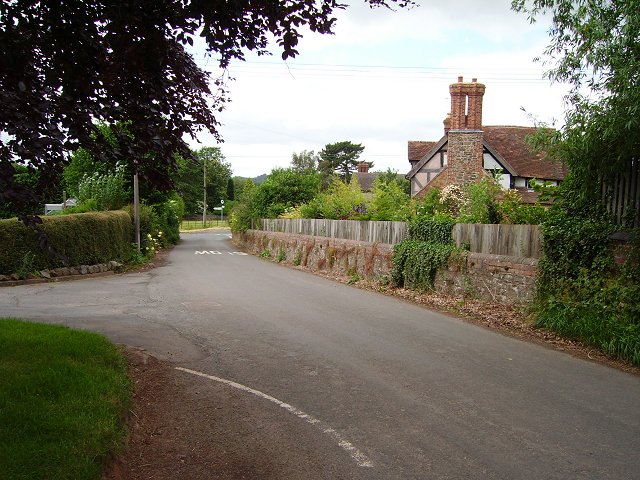
- Bitterley

- Location within Shropshire
- Population: 902 (2011) (parish)
- OS grid reference: SO561774
- Civil parish: Bitterley
- Unitary authority: Shropshire
- Ceremonial county: Shropshire
- Region: West Midlands
- Country: England
- Sovereign state: United Kingdom
- Post town: LUDLOW
- Postcode district: SY8
- Dialling code: 01584
- Police: West Mercia
- Fire: Shropshire
- Ambulance: West Midlands
- UK Parliament: Ludlow

Bitterley is a village and civil parish in Shropshire, England. According to the 2001 census the parish had a population of 802, increasing to 902 at the 2011 Census. The village is about 4 miles (6.4 km) east of Ludlow on the western slopes of Titterstone Clee Hill. Bitterley is the location for Bitterley Court about 0.62 miles (1.00 km) east of the modern village. Nearby to the east, is the small hamlet of Bedlam.

== History ==
Bitterley is listed in the Domesday Book of 1086 when it was known as Buterlei. The fictional village of Bitterley in the Mary Webb novel The Golden Arrow (published 1916) was based on Habberley in the same county.

In 2011, a metal detectorist discovered near Bitterley a hoard of silver and gold coins, the Bitterley Hoard, dating from the English Civil War.

== Church ==
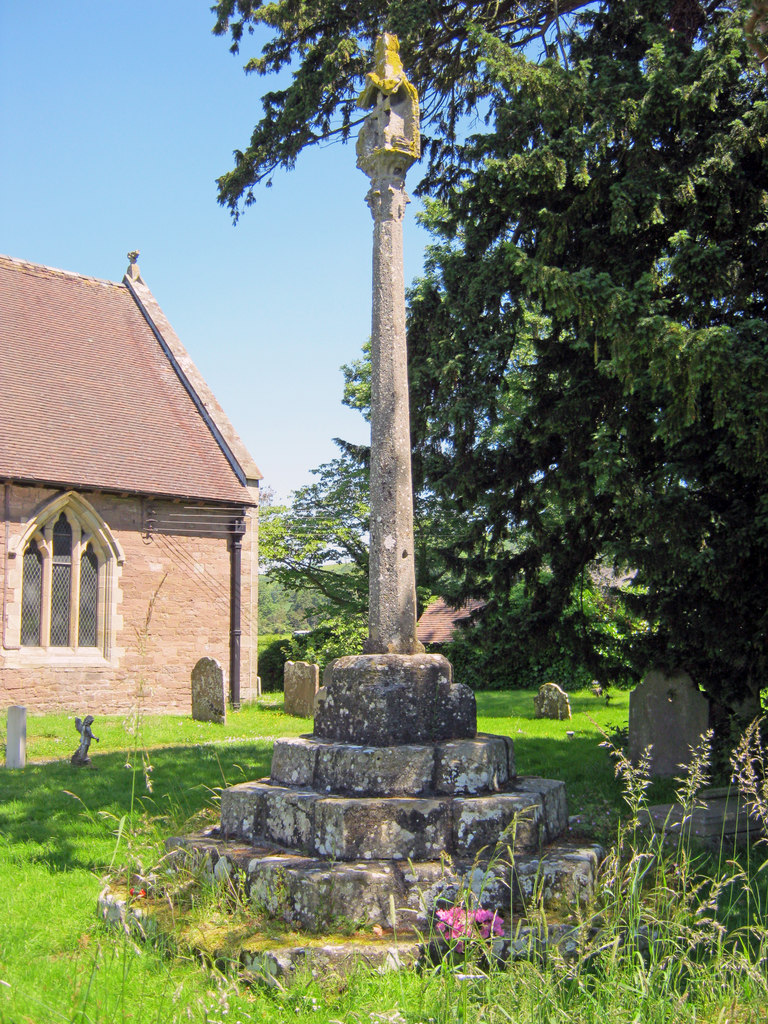
Medieval cross in St Mary's churchyard

Church of St Mary, the village church dedicated to Saint Mary, is 12th/13th-century in date with 17th-century alterations. It was restored in 1876 and 1880. Littleton Powys was patron of the church, where in 1707 he set up a gallery at the west end, and in which he was buried after his death in 1732.

The 14th-century cross in the churchyard is a Grade I listed structure and considered the best surviving cross in Shropshire.

The church is located east of the present-day village in the area around Bitterley Court, where evidence of the medieval village can be seen in the parkland south of Bitterley Court.

== Bitterley Court ==
Bitterley Court was the longtime seat of the Walcot family, who had previously sold their Walcot Hall to Robert Clive, known as Lord Clive of India. In 1899, Bitterley Court was purchased by James Volant Wheeler, younger son of Edward Vincent Wheeler of Newnham Court, Tenbury Wells, and remains in the ownership of the Wheelers. Bitterley Court is a Grade II* listed building which was extensively modernized by Thomas Prichard in the late 18th century and restored by the grandson of James Volant Wheeler in the 1960s, saving it from demolition at a time when English country houses were at risk.

== Henley Hall ==
On the western outskirts of the village lies Henley Hall, a Grade II* listed 18th-century country house in 80 hectares of parkland. Originally built by the Powys family it was essentially rebuilt by Thomas Knight in 1772 and extended several times since then, especially by the Wood family. Now managed by the Lumsden family, it is made available for wedding, shooting and team-building parties.

== Transport ==
Bitterley was formerly served by a goods station on the branch line from Clee Hill Junction north of Ludlow to Clee Hill village. Two rope inclines, one narrow gauge and one standard gauge, carried stone from the quarries on Titterstone Clee Hill down to a marshalling yard at Bitterley.

== Parish ==
The civil parish is extensive and is subdivided into two wards: Bitterley and Cleeton St Mary. The small village of Cleeton St Mary is effectively detached (by road) and lies on the other side of Titterstone Clee Hill. The small village of Middleton and the hillside settlement of Angelbank are part of the parish. Other communities mentioned by the parish council are Dhustone, Farden, Henley, Ledwyche and Snitton, as well as Bedlam (mentioned above).

In 1884 it expanded westwards, taking in land previously part of Ludford and Stanton Lacy parishes, with the new boundary being the Ledwyche Brook.

== See also ==
- Listed buildings in Bitterley
