= Fishpool Hoard =

British hoard

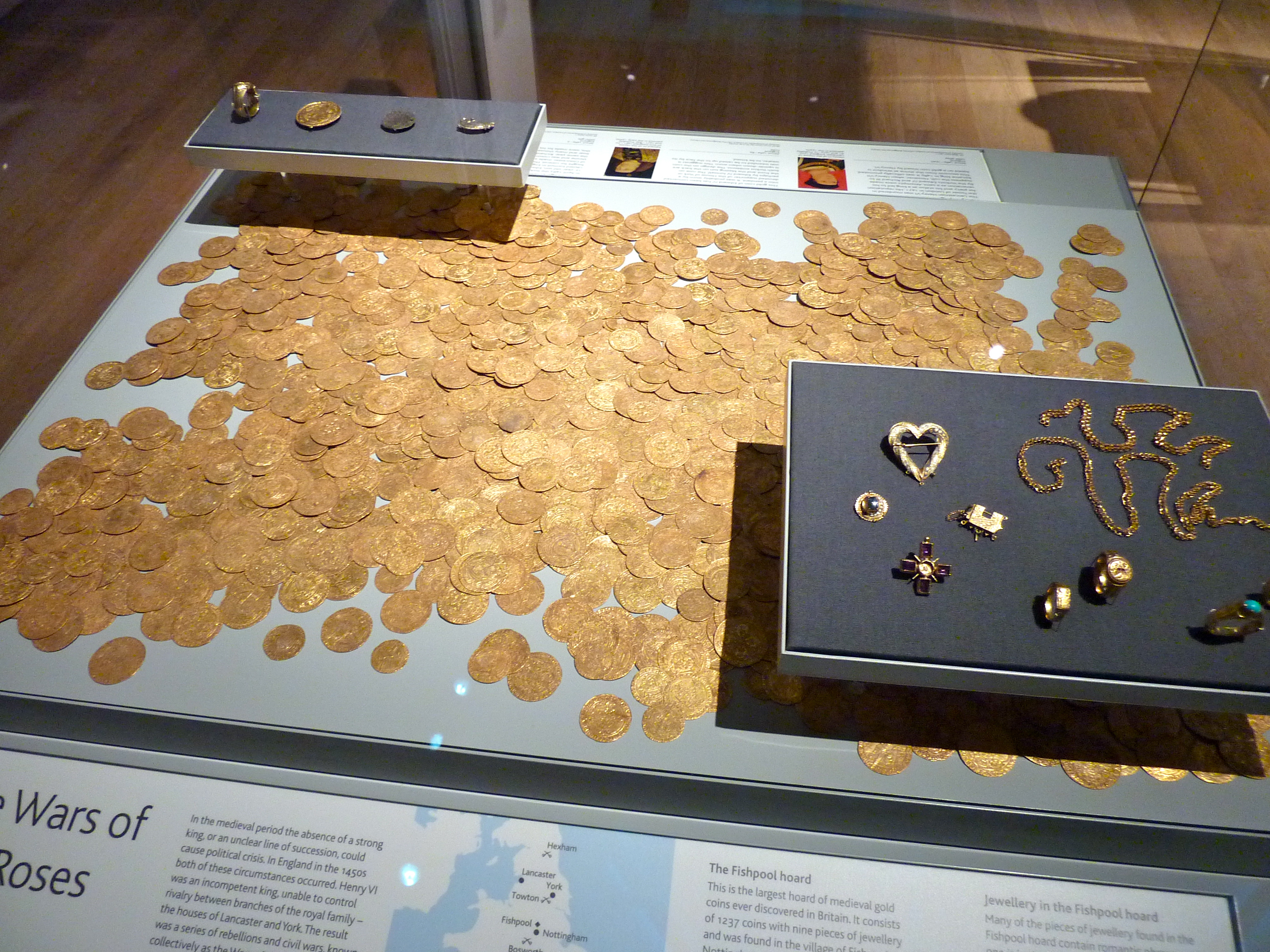
The Hoard today in the British Museum

In 1966 the Fishpool Hoard of 1,237 15th century gold coins, four rings and four other pieces of jewellery, and two lengths of gold chain was discovered by workmen on a building site near present-day Cambourne Gardens, in Ravenshead, Nottinghamshire, England, an area that was then known as "Fishpool". It is the largest hoard of medieval coins ever found in Britain. To judge from the dates of the coins, the hoard was probably buried in haste at some time between winter 1463 and summer 1464, perhaps by someone fleeing south after the Battle of Hexham in May 1464, in the first stages of England's civil war between aristocratic factions, the War of the Roses. The Fishpool Hoard, on display in Room 40 in the British Museum, London, was listed in 2003 among Our Top Ten Treasures, a special episode of BBC Television series Meet the Ancestors that profiled the ten most important treasures ever unearthed in Britain as voted by a panel of experts from the British Museum. The British Museum assesses the face value of the hoard when deposited, about £400, would be equivalent to around £300,000 today.

The makeup of the coinage, as well as dating the hoard, showed that the light coinage of 1412 did not eliminate earlier gold coins. Among the coins were detected some nearly contemporary gold-plated counterfeit coins from the reign of Henry VI (1422–61).

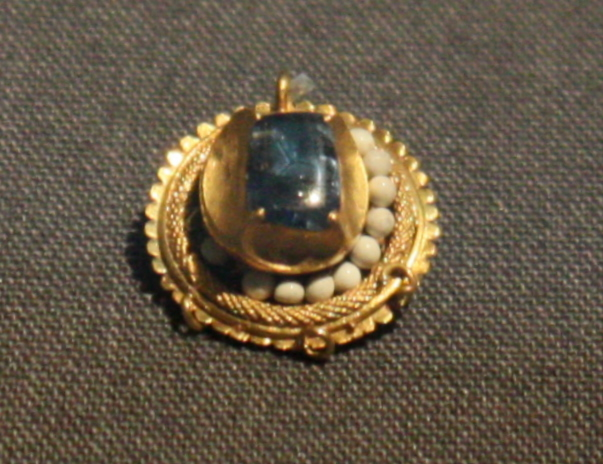
One of the pendants

The jewellery is all in gold, with several items set with gems or using enamel. Apart from the four rings there are three pendants and a heart-shaped brooch, which like some other items is inscribed with an "amatory phrase", in this case "je suys vostre sans de partier" (I am yours wholly). One of the pendants is a tiny enamelled padlock, inscribed "de tout" on one side and "mon cuer" on the other (of all ... my heart). The turquoise gem on one ring was reputed to have protective powers for the wearer against drowning, poison and riding accidents. The rings are thought to be English, but other items may be made in Flanders.

== See also ==
- List of hoards in Britain
