= Cleeton St Mary =

Village in Shropshire, England

Coordinates: 52.404°N 2.572°W

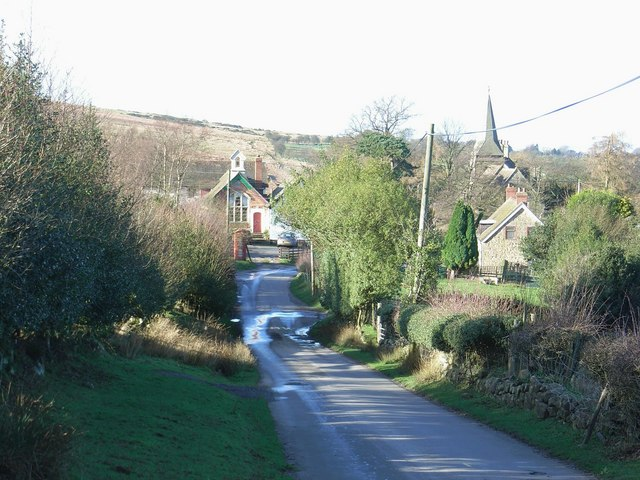
- The village with the church and former schoolhouse, both Victorian

- Location within Shropshire
- OS grid reference: SO610786
- Civil parish: Bitterley
- Unitary authority: Shropshire
- Ceremonial county: Shropshire
- Region: West Midlands
- Country: England
- Sovereign state: United Kingdom
- Post town: KIDDERMINSTER
- Postcode district: DY14
- Dialling code: 01584
- Police: West Mercia
- Fire: Shropshire
- Ambulance: West Midlands
- UK Parliament: Ludlow

Cleeton St Mary (or Cleeton) is a small village in south Shropshire, England.

It lies on the northeast slope of Titterstone Clee Hill, at an elevation of 316 metres (1,037 ft) above sea level. Cleeton forms part of the civil parish of Bitterley, even though the parish largely exists on the other side of Titterstone Clee, and Cleeton is effectively detached (by road). Cleeton St Mary is a parish ward. Large areas of common land remain around the village; the countryside here is largely pasture (for grazing of sheep and horses), woodland and moorland.

The church of Saint Mary (Church of England) is situated here but is relatively new, being built in the second half of the 19th century (along with the schoolhouse). It is grade II listed.

Cleeton is mentioned in the Cadfael novel The Virgin in the Ice which is set in 1139.

== See also ==
- Listed buildings in Bitterley
