= Our Top Ten Treasures =

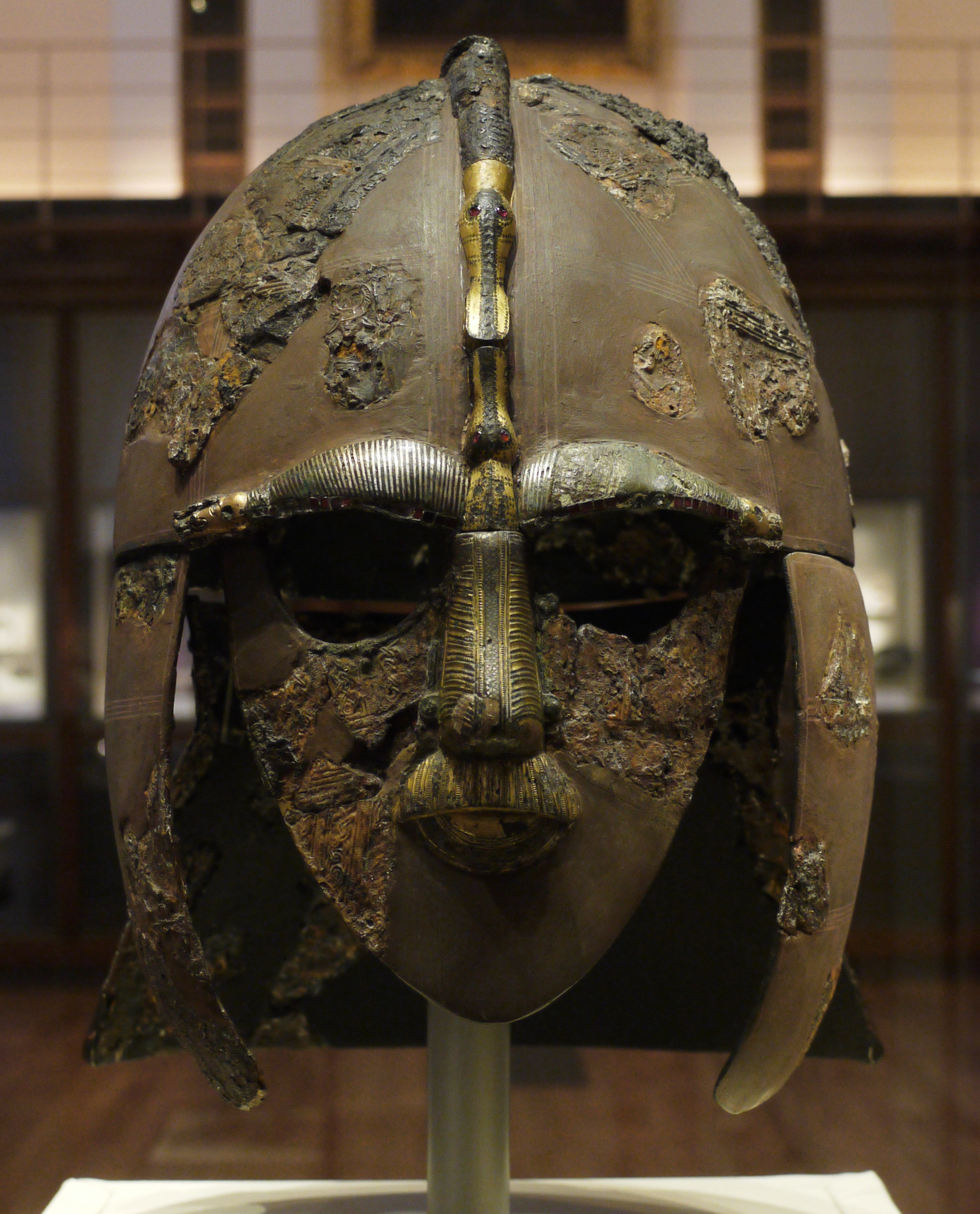
- The Sutton Hoo helmet
- Genre: Documentary
- Directed by: Patricia Wheatley
- Presented by: Adam Hart-Davis
- Country of origin: United Kingdom
- Original language: English

Production
- Executive producers: Stephen Wilkinson; Caroline van den Brul
- Producer: Patricia Wheatley

Original release
- Network: BBC Two
- Release: 1 January 2003

Our Top Ten Treasures was a 2003 special episode of the BBC Television series Meet the Ancestors which profiled the ten most important treasures unearthed in Britain, as voted for by a panel of experts from the British Museum.

== Production ==
The programme was commissioned for broadcast on New Year's Day 2003 to tie in with an exhibition at the British Museum as part of new director Neil MacGregor's attempts to popularise the museum.

Following the broadcast viewers were invited to vote for their favourites in a poll that was won by the Vindolanda Tablets, with the Sutton Hoo ship burial in second place.

== Reception ==
Richard Morrison writing in The Times criticised the British Museum for co-operating in an, "unashamedly populist television archaeology venture," and another article in the same title stated, "You may not like the idea of a league table of treasures that pits one priceless object against another, but television has its own logic."

== Synopsis ==
Every year thousands of precious things are dug up in Britain and many of them find their way here to the British Museum in London, together they represent an amazing amount of history. We've asked the museum to look out their top exhibits, both single objects and whole hoards, and we're going to go behind the scenes down into the treasure room to have a look at the top ten treasures of Britain.

— Adam Hart-Davis's introduction

Hart-Davis presents the top ten treasures as voted by the expert panel in reverse order.

Image	Number	Object	Date	Finder	When found	Where found
	10	The Bronze Age Ringlemere Gold Cup	Bronze Age	metal-detectorist Cliff Bradshaw	2001	near Dover
	9	Cuerdale Silver Hoard	10th century	stoneworkers	1840	banks of the River Ribble
	8	Fishpool Hoard	15th century	workmen	1966	Ravenshead, Nottinghamshire
	7	Mildenhall Roman Dinner Service	Roman	Gordon Butcher, a ploughman	1942	near Mildenhall, Suffolk
	6	Mold cape	Bronze Age	stoneworkers	1833	Mold, Flintshire, Wales
	5	Lewis chessmen	12th century	Malcolm Macleod, small tenant of Pennydonald, Uig	1831	Uig, Isle of Lewis in 1831 but originating in Scandinavia
	4	Snettisham Hoard	Celtic Iron Age		1948 onwards	outside King's Lynn, Norfolk
	3	Hoxne Hoard	Roman	metal-detectorist Eric Lawes	1992	near Eye, Suffolk
	2	Sutton Hoo ship burial	Early Anglo-Saxon, 7th century	Basil Brown and Edith Pretty	1940	Woodbridge, Suffolk
	1	Vindolanda tablets	Roman	Robin Birley	1973	near Hadrians Wall

== Contributors ==
- Robin Birley (Director, Vindolanda Trust)
- Roger Bland (Head, Portable Antiquities Scheme)
- Alan Bowman (Centre of Ancient Writing, University of Oxford)
- Cliff Bradshaw (metal-detectorist)
- Christine Carpenter (Historian, Cambridge University)
- Martin Carver (Director, Sutton Hoo Research Trust)
- Barrie Cook (Curator of Coins & Medals, British Museum)
- Angela Evans (Curator, Anglo-Saxon Collections, British Museum)
- Irving Finkel (Asst Keeper, Cuneiform Collections, British Museum)
- J.D. Hill (Curator, Iron Age Collections, British Museum)
- Richard Hobbs (Curator, Romano-British Collections, British Museum)
- Catherine Johns (Former Senior Curator, British Museum)
- Neil MacGregor (Director, British Museum)
- Ian McIntyre (Metal Conservator, British Museum)
- Stuart Needham (Curator, Bronze Age Collections, British Museum)
- Keith Parfitt (Canterbury Archaeological Trust)
- Jude Plouviez (Suffolk Archaeological Unit)
- James Robinson (Curator, Medieval Collections, British Museum)
- Leslie Webster (Formerly Keeper, Medieval & Modern Europe Dept, British Museum)
- Gareth Williams (Curator of Coins & Medals, British Museum)
- Jonathan Williams (then Curator of Iron Age and Roman coins (now Keeper, Medieval & Modern Europe Dept), British Museum)

== See also ==
- A History of the World in 100 Objects
- Britain's Secret Treasures
