= Church of St Mary, Bitterley =

Church in Shropshire, England

Coordinates: 52.3920°N 2.6320°W

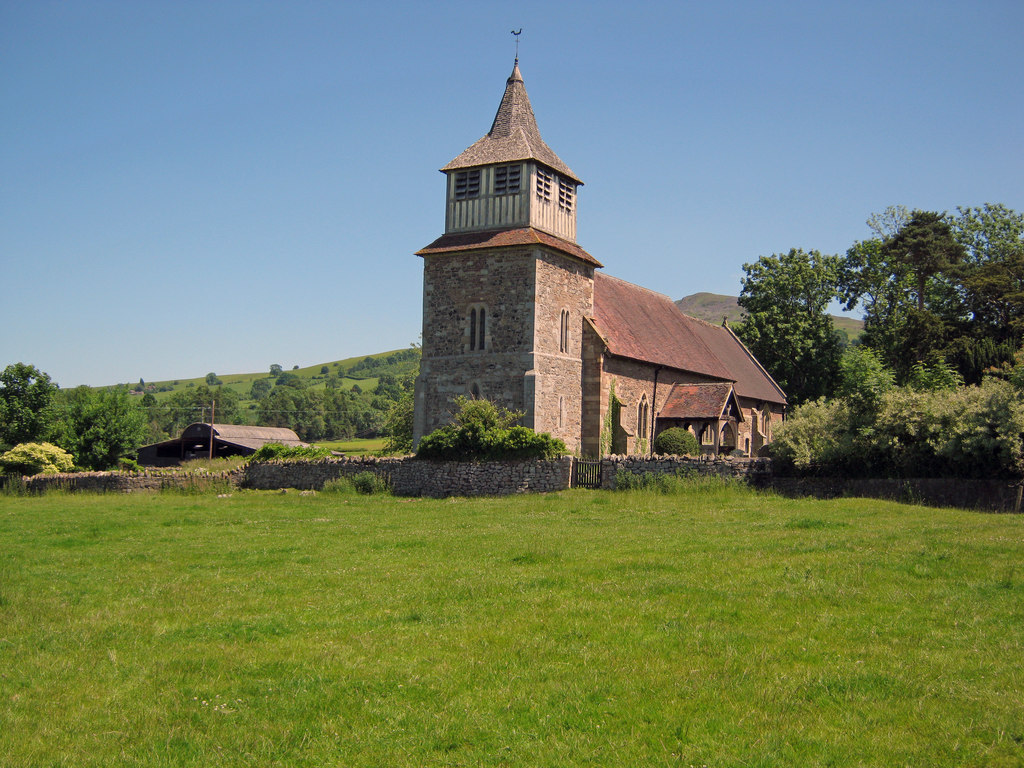
Church of St Mary, Bitterley

The Church of St Mary is located in Bitterley, Shropshire, England. Built in the 12th century and later, it is a Grade II* listed building.

== History ==
The building was constructed in the 12th and 13th centuries. There were alterations in the 17th century. Littleton Powys was patron of the church, where, in 1707, he set up a gallery at the west end, and in which he was buried after his death in 1732. The church was restored during the later 19th century. On 12 November 1954, the church became a Grade II* listed building, while on the same day, the cross in the churchyard was listed as Grade I.

== Architecture and fittings ==
It consists of a body, without side aisles. The chancel is divided from the body by an oak screen carved in open quatrefoils. Foliage and ornaments are featured at the top. There is a gallery at the west end. The ceiling is coves without ornamentation. Opposite the south door, there is an ancient stone font. The pulpit is constructed of carved oak. The length of the body of the church is 59.5 feet (18.1 m), the width is 22 feet (6.7 m). The length of the chancel is 33.5 feet (10.2 m), and its width is 22 feet (6.7 m). The church tower is 44.25 feet (13.49 m), by 14 feet (4.3 m); it contains three bells. The parish war memorials consist of a two-light stained glass window featuring two Roman soldiers, dedicated by John and Mary Burton in memory of men from the parish who died in the First World War; those who died are listed on a stone plaque below, and those who died in the Second World War on another similar plaque. To the right of the window is a memorial plaque to Captain John Henry Walcot of the King's Shropshire Light Infantry who was killed near Dunkirk in 1940. On the north wall at the east end of the church is preserved a wooden cross from the battlefield grave of Lieutenant-Colonel Philip Vaughan Holberton, Lancashire Fusiliers, who was killed in France in 1918.

== Grounds ==
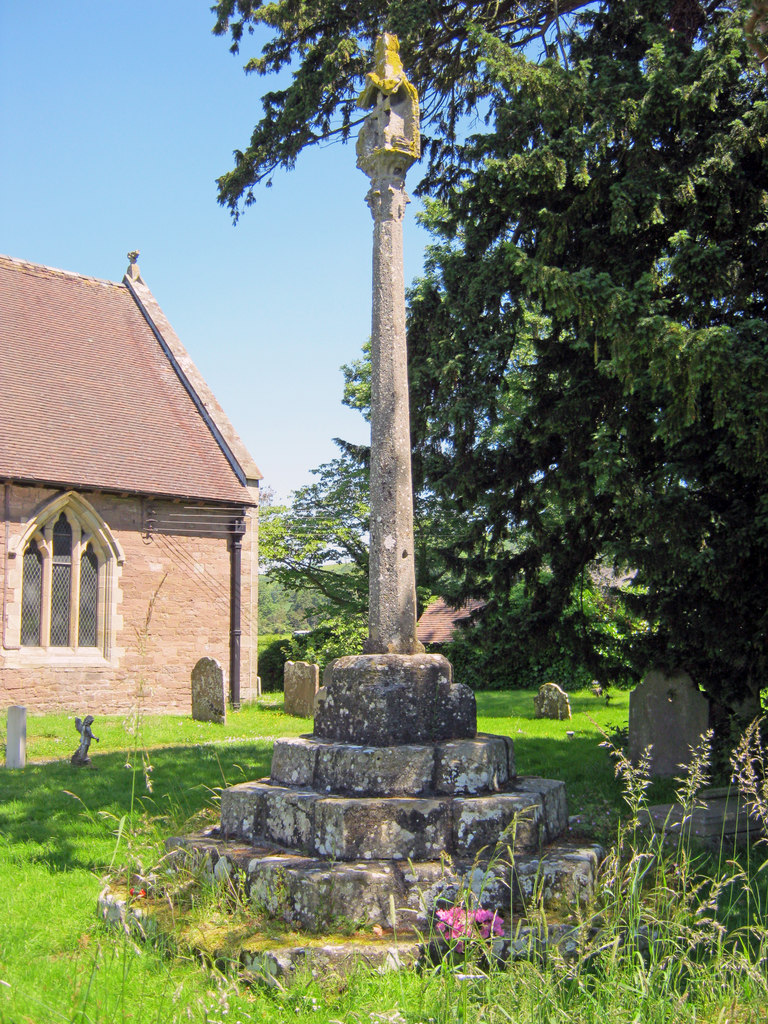
Stone cross in churchyard

In the churchyard, there is a stone cross, raised on steps, which support an hexagonal shaft. On the top, there are tabernacled niches. The one on the north side contains the Virgin and infant Christ, while the one on the west side contains the Crucifixion. The views on the east and south sides are nearly obliterated.

The churchyard contains eight war graves of British servicemen, four from World War I and four (including two brothers) from World War II.

== See also ==
- Grade II* listed buildings in Shropshire Council (A–G)
- Listed buildings in Bitterley
