= Middleton, Bitterley =

Village in Shropshire, England

Coordinates: 52.390°N 2.677°W

Middleton
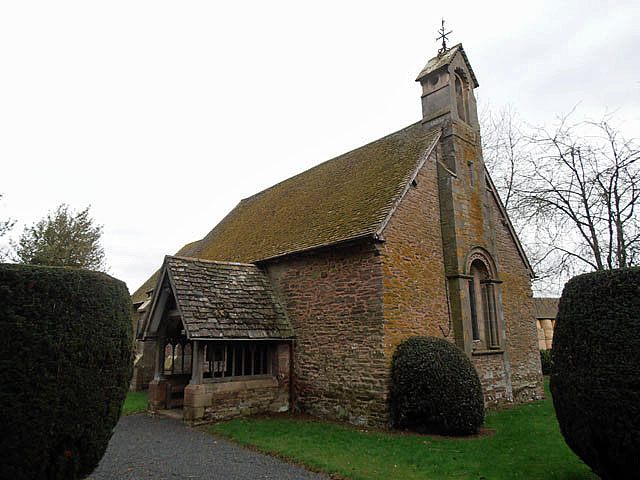
- Middleton Chapel

- Location within Shropshire
- OS grid reference: SO539771
- Civil parish: Bitterley
- Unitary authority: Shropshire
- Ceremonial county: Shropshire
- Region: West Midlands
- Country: England
- Sovereign state: United Kingdom
- Post town: LUDLOW
- Postcode district: SY8
- Dialling code: 01584
- Police: West Mercia
- Fire: Shropshire
- Ambulance: West Midlands
- UK Parliament: Ludlow

Middleton is a small village in south Shropshire, England. It is located 2.5 miles (4.0 km) northeast of Ludlow town centre, on the B4364 road (which runs between Ludlow and Bridgnorth), in the civil parish of Bitterley.

The settlement existed at the time of the Domesday Book (1086) when it had a mill on the Ledwyche Brook. At the time it formed part of the hundred of Culvestan, which merged into the new hundred of Munslow in the early 12th century.

For several hundred years it was known as Middleton Higford after its chief tenant Walter de Huggeford who had his main holding at Higford near Shifnal.

Middleton has a Norman chapel, much renovated in the 1850s, with a Norman motte next to it. It is a grade II* listed building.

Middleton Court nearby was built in 1864 by the Rouse-Boughton family of Downton Hall who owned most of the land around.

Brook House, built in the late 1500s, is a timber-framed moated manor house which is also Grade II* listed. Its late 18th Century privy, 17th and 18th Century outbuilding and kiln and its stables dated 1726 are all Grade II listed. Brook House Cottage (Grade II* listed) is medieval with 17th Century and 19th Century alterations.

Middleton was on the now-dismantled railway line from Clee Hill Junction in Ludlow to the quarries on Clee Hill.

Most of the present-day village is 20th century and built along the B4364, comprising some older detached properties and three housing developments: Paddockside, Westview and Ledwyche Close.

== See also ==
- Listed buildings in Bitterley
- Middleton, Shropshire (disambiguation)
