= Beeston Tor Hoard =

Anglo-Saxon treasure in Staffordshire

The Beeston Tor Hoard is an Anglo-Saxon jewellery and coin hoard discovered in 1924 at Beeston Tor in Staffordshire. The hoard consists of forty-nine coins, two silver brooches with Trewhiddle style decoration, three finger rings, and miscellaneous fragments. The coins date the burial of the hoard to approximately 875 AD.

== History ==
The Beeston Tor hoard was discovered by Rev. George. H. Wilson of Chorlton-cum-Hardy, England in 1924. The treasure was found in a cave known as St. Bertram's cave on the limestone cliff of Beeston Tor in Staffordshire, England. The hoard's close proximity to a Viking army camped in nearby Repton in the winter of 873 to 874 AD suggests a possible connection between the hoard and the Viking invasion. The find consisted of 49 Anglo-Saxon pennies, three gold rings, two silver brooches, and assorted fragments.

Wilson wrote about the treasure in his book, Some Caves and Crags of Peakland and Cave Hunting Holidays in Peakland, which was published in 1926. Besides the coins, brooches, and finger-rings, Wilson recounted finding various fragments and strap ends. He also described discovering the hoard items loose among traces of skin or leather, and suggested that the jewellery and coins may have originally been inside a bag or purse.

== Items discovered ==
=== Coins ===
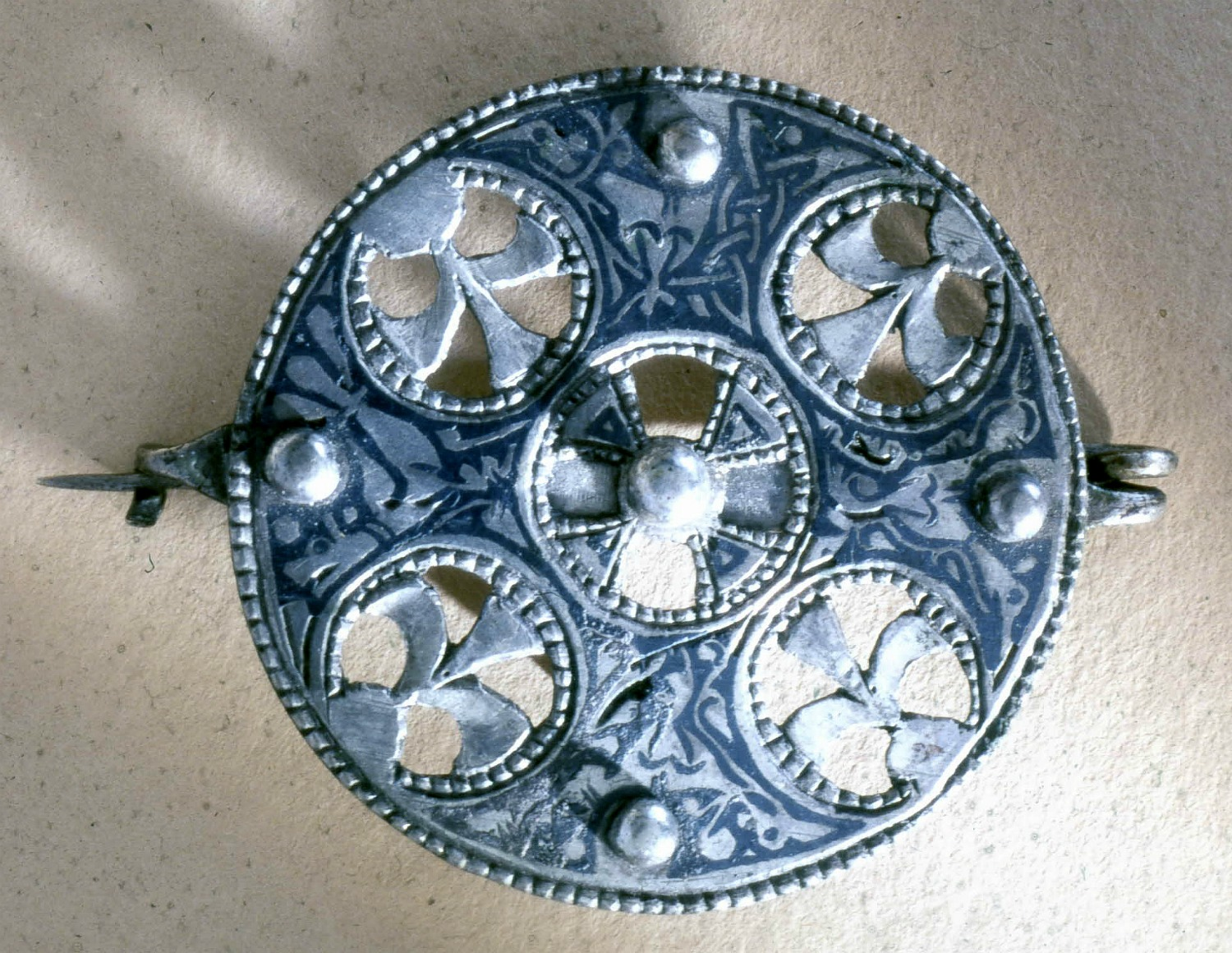
Openwork disc brooch, Beeston Tor hoard

The hoard consists of forty-nine Anglo-Saxon pennies dating to the ninth century, the newest pre-dating 875 AD. Twenty coins each were issued by King Burgred of Mercia (853-874) and Alfred the Great from Wessex (871-886). Of the remaining nine coins, seven were minted by Æthelred I, King of Wessex (865-871), one by Archbishop Ceonolth of Canterbury (833-870), and one by Æthelwulf, King of Wessex (839-858).

=== Brooches ===
The two silver brooches found in the hoard are representative of the ninth century Trewhiddle style of Anglo-Saxon England. Characteristics of the style are: the use of silver, niello inlay, intricate carving, and interlaced animal, plant and geometric patterns. Each brooch represents different features of the style, the smaller brooch belongs to the class of intricately designed openwork brooches with zoomorphic motifs and the larger brooch is characteristic of the more simple, flat disc brooches with abstract ornamentation.

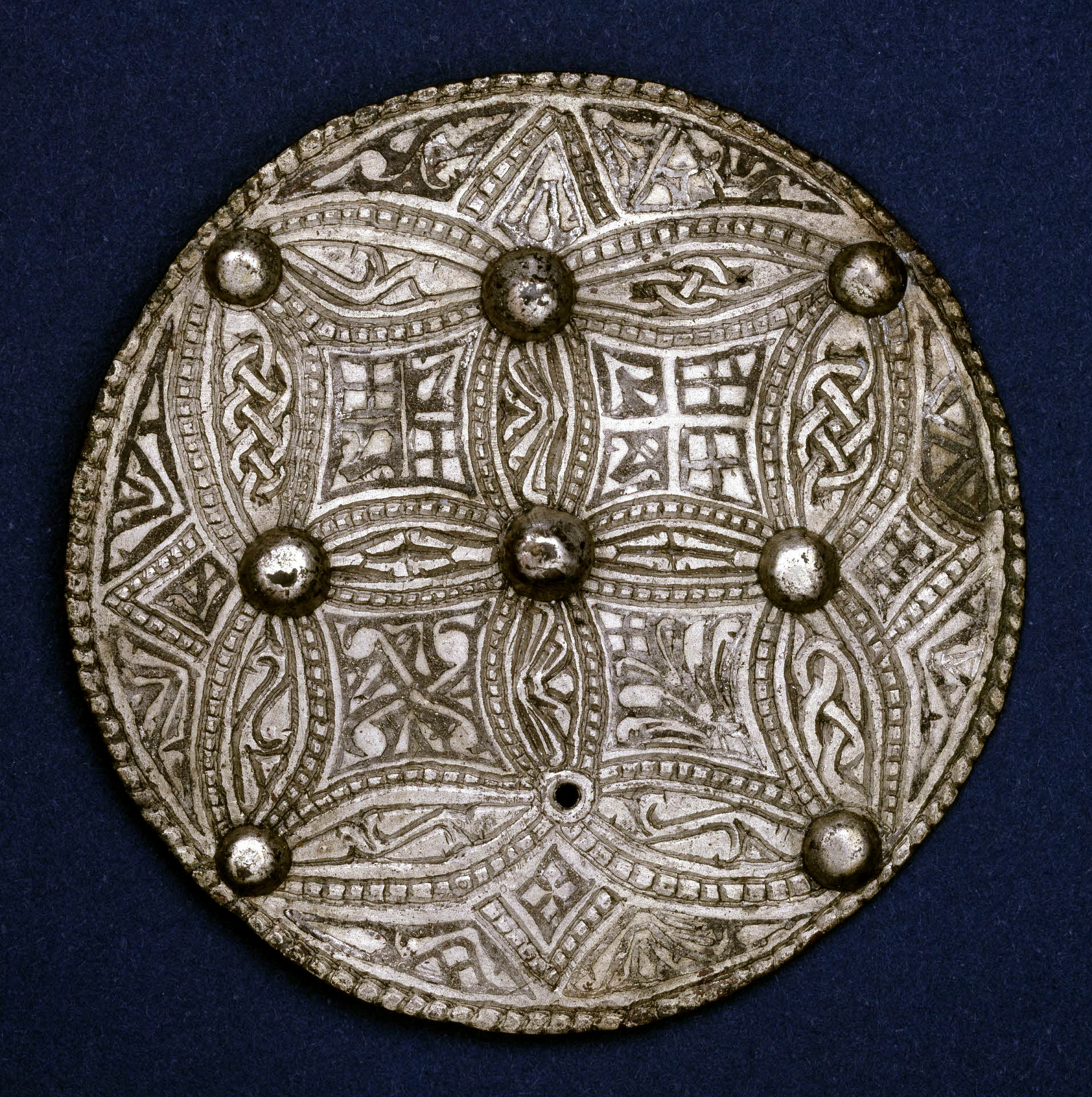
Sheet disc brooch, Beeston Tor hoard

The smallest brooch has an openwork design with a niello background. A beaded outer rim contains a central cross motif with expanded terminals, each containing a boss (raised ornament). Three of the five bosses positioned in the center of the brooch, connect the pin attachment to the base of the brooch. The ornamentation of the brooch includes animal motifs with beaked heads The zoomorphic designs on the brooch are nonidentical, and are mixed with interlacing and ivy-scrolls. The second, larger brooch is a flat, silver disc brooch plainly decorated with abstract motifs. The brooch design contains four intersecting circles with nine small bosses (one missing) equidistant to each other and joined by pointed oval spaces. Ornamentation includes simple interlacing along with plant and geometric symbols.

=== Rings and binding ===
Three finger rings were among the hoard items. One gold finger ring with a lozenge shaped cross section and two copper-alloy wire finger rings, one broken, were found by Wilson. A copper-alloy binding was also found. It consists of a warped sheet with beaded edging, narrowing to a rounded terminal. The terminal contains one rivet; two other rivets are located on the binding at the point where the piece narrows.

== See also ==
- Pentney Hoard
- Anglo-Saxon art
- List of hoards in Great Britain
