= Henley Hall, Shropshire =

Country house in Bitterley, Shropshire, England

Coordinates: 52.381°N 2.675752°W

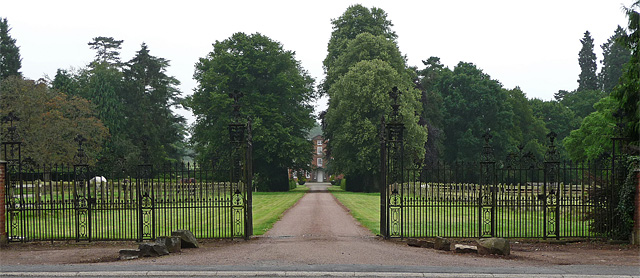
Henley Hall, viewed from the A4117

Henley Hall is a building of historical significance and is listed on the English Heritage Register. It was built in about 1610 by the Powys family and then substantially changed in 1772. Additions were again made in the late 19th century. It is a generally a three-storey building in brick with a slate roof. Flanking wings were added at both ends of the original linear building c. 1772 and further major extensions carried out in 1875 and 1907. The hall is surrounded by landscaped and formal gardens covering some 60 hectares. The hall itself is listed grade II* and the orangery, outbuildings, dovecote and Bitterley main gate are listed Grade II. It is situated 2.5 miles (4.0 km) northeast of Ludlow town centre, just off the A4117 road to Cleobury Mortimer. The Ledwyche Brook flows by the estate.

== Overview ==
The hall was originally built by the Powys family in the early 17th century. The estate was sold to Thomas Knight in 1770, who commissioned its modernisation circa 1772.

The landscape park was laid out in the late 18th century and the formal gardens created by Edmund Thomas Wedgwood Wood after he bought the site in 1874. Notable features include Pulhamite rockwork, a ha-ha, an Elizabethan octagonal dovecote and a walled garden. There is also a former sunken garden created by Italian prisoners of war. The estate is surrounded by yew hedges, although the original yew maze has been lost. The main gates were brought from Wirksworth Hall in Derbyshire during the 19th century.

From 1962 until 2015 the property was owned by the Lumsden family. Under the stewardship of the present owners, the hall and estate are now made available for weddings, shooting parties and team-building activities. A cedar tree arboretum has been established.

== Early owners ==
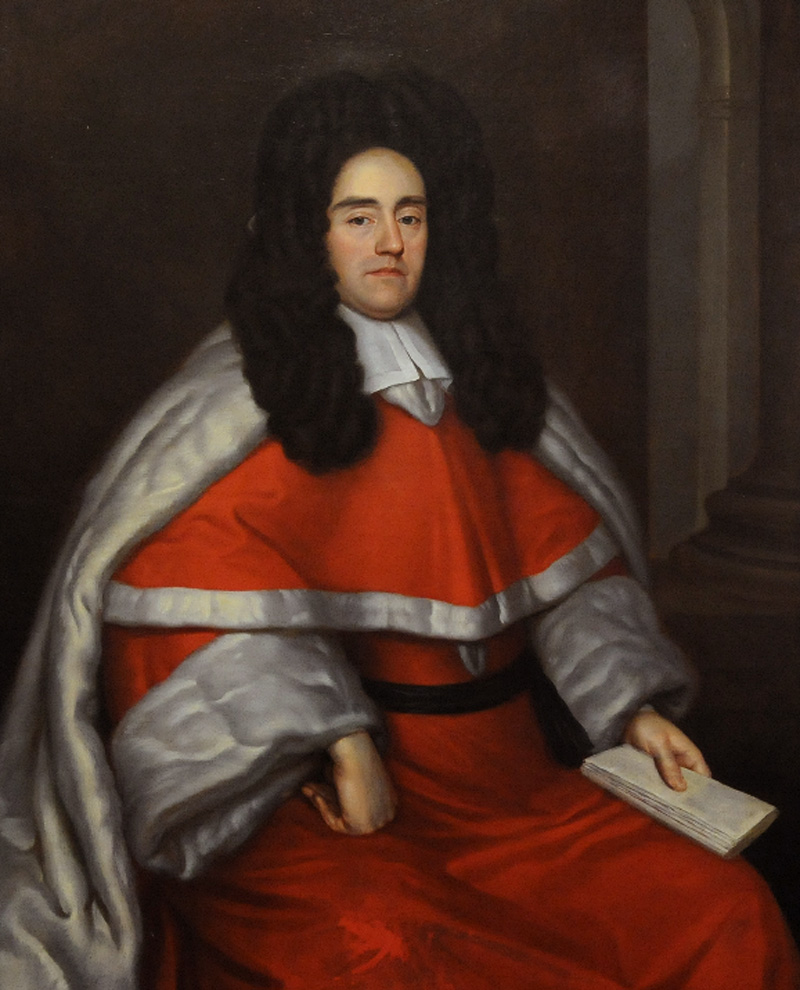
Sir Littleton Powys

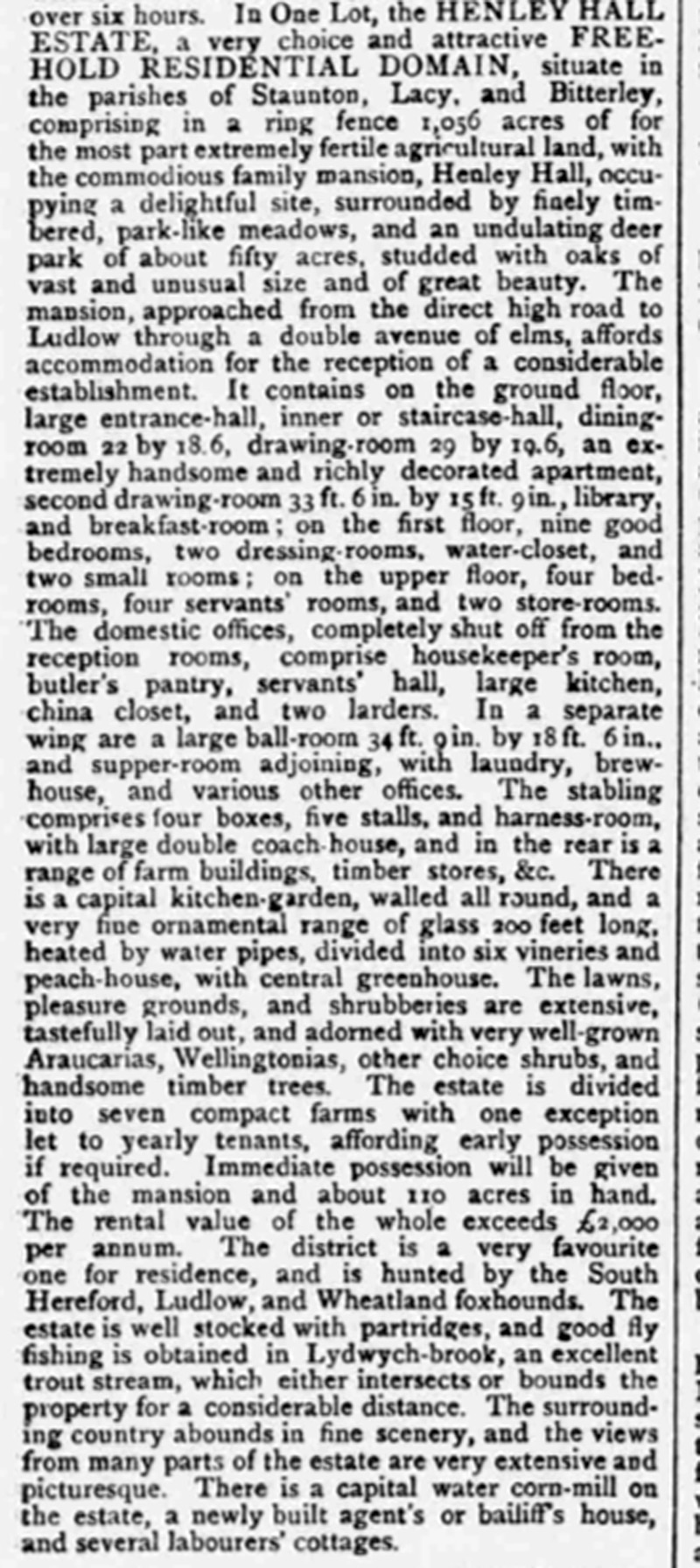
Sale advertisement for Henley Hall in 1874

Thomas Powys bought the Henley estate in about 1600. The original house which forms the core of the current building was built by him in 1610. He was succeeded by his eldest son Thomas Powys (1617–1671), who was a barrister. He married Ann Littleton, daughter of Sir Adam Littleton, 1st Baronet. The couple had four sons and two daughters. His eldest son Sir Littleton Powys (1647–1732), who inherited the hall in 1671, received a knighthood from William III in 1692 on being made a Serjeant-at-law. He was appointed a baron of the Court of Exchequer in October 1695 and remained there until he was raised to the King's Bench on 26 January 1701.

In 1674 he married Agnes Carter but the couple had no children. He died in 1732, having outlived all of his brothers and his eldest nephew. His estates were left to his great-nephew Thomas Powys (1719–1767), who was the grandson of Sir Thomas Powys. When he died in 1767, Henley Hall was left to his eldest son Thomas Powys, who was made 1st Baron Lilford. Baron Lilford decided to sell the house in 1770, three years after he had inherited it. It was bought by Thomas Knight.

Thomas Knight (1737–1803) was born in Burrington, Herefordshire, in 1737. He was the son of Ralph Knight and Mary Duppa. He made extensive changes to the hall and gave it the appearance that it has today. He did not marry and lived at the hall with his two spinster sisters Martha and Elizabeth. Martha died in 1797. Thomas died in 1803 and left the hall to his sister Elizabeth for her life. His will stated that after her death it was to go to Reverend Samuel Johnes on the condition that he changed his name to Knight. Elizabeth died in 1813 and Reverend Samuel Johnes Knight became the owner.

Rev. Samuel Johnes Knight (1756–1852) was born in 1756. His father was Thomas Johnes of Croft Castle, Herefordshire. He was educated at the University of Oxford and became a rector of Welwyn in 1797. In 1808 he married Anna Maria Cuyler, daughter of Sir Cornelius Cuyler, 1st Baronet. The couple had one child, a daughter named Louisa Elizabeth. He lived there intermittently with his family for some years; then in about 1835 he rented it to his brother-in-law Sir Charles Cuyler.

Major General Sir Charles Cuyler (1794–1862) was born in 1794 in London to Sir Cornelius Cuyler. He succeeded his father as baronet in 1819. In 1823 he married Catherine Frances Hallifax, daughter of Rev. Robert Fitzwilliam Hallifax. The couple had thirteen children.

== Later residents ==
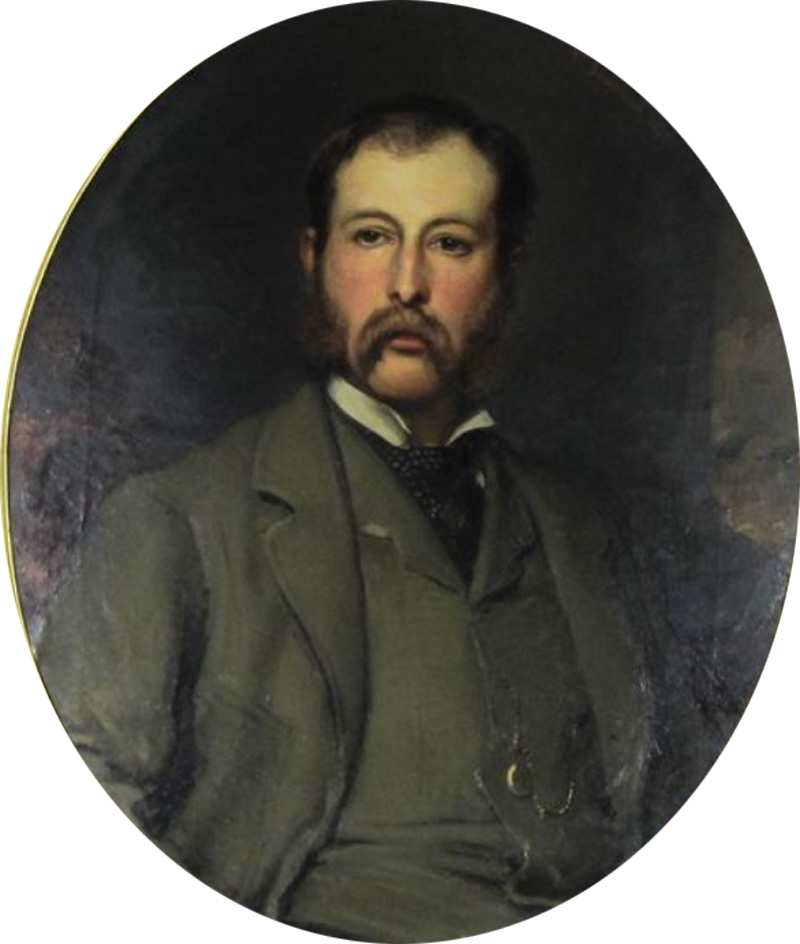
John Baddeley Wood 1876

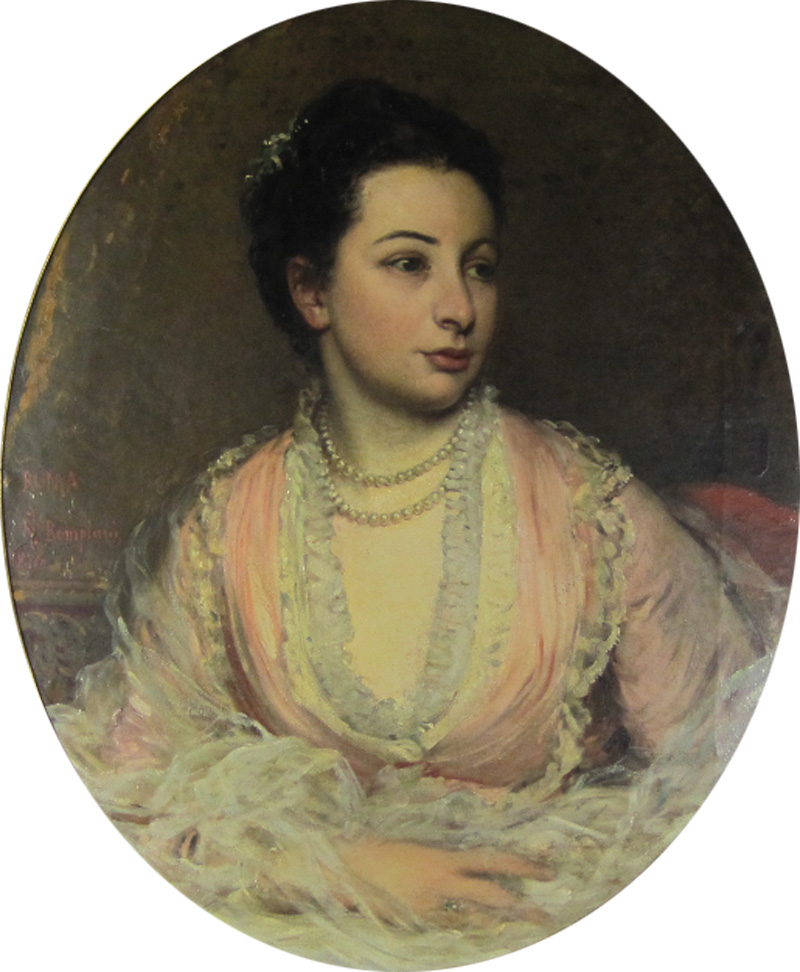
Elizabeth Marianne Wood (usually called Marianne)

Rev. Samuel Johnes Knight died in 1852, and, as he had no male heirs, the hall was inherited by the next legal heir, Thomas Knight (1775–1853) of Papcastle in Cumbria. He died the following year in 1853, and his son John Knight (1803–1872) became the owner of Henley Hall. He lived there for the next nineteen years, and under his ownership the property became neglected. When he died in 1872, his executors sold the hall in 1874 to Edmund Thomas Wedgwood Wood.

Edmund Thomas Wedgwood Wood (1822–1886) made extensive renovations and many fine additions to the hall, including the east and west wings, the formal gardens with the beautiful stone-balustraded stone steps and the very fine double-arched stone bridge over the River Ledwyche. He was born in 1822 in Burslem. His father was John Wood (1778–1848) and his mother was Mary (Baddeley) Wood (1787–1866). He set up an earthenware manufacturing company called Woodland Pottery in Tunstall with his brother and became quite wealthy. In 1845 he married Sophia Louisa Schmidt (1819–1895) and the couple had four children, three sons and a daughter. When he died in 1886, his son John Baddeley Wood inherited the hall.

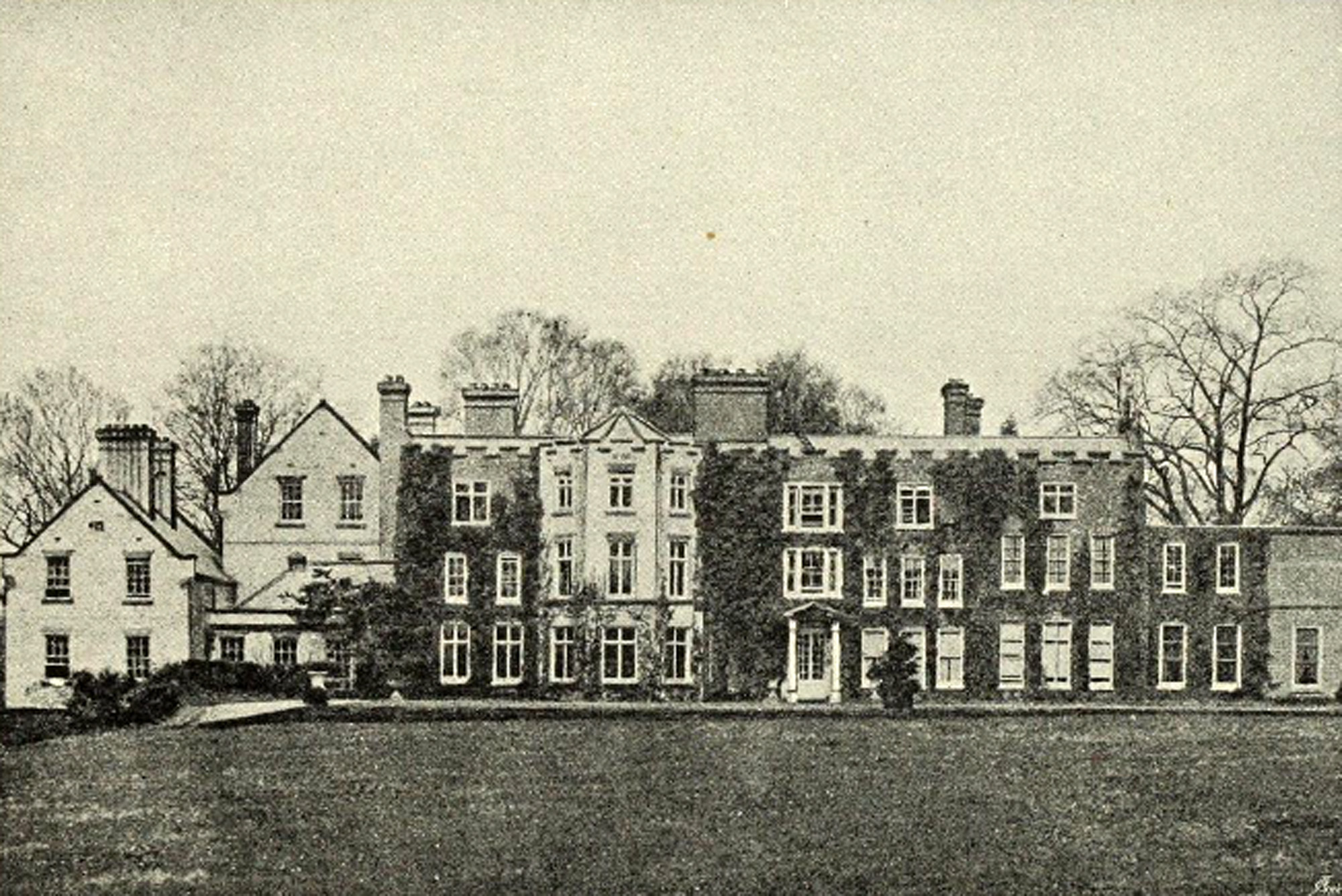
Henley Hall in 1888 at the time it was owned by John Baddeley Wood

John Baddeley Wood (1849–1911) was born in 1849. He was educated at the University of Oxford and became a barrister. In 1876 he married Elizabeth Marianne Wood (1855–1931), who was his cousin. She was the only child of Nicholas Price Wood of Wirksworth Hall, Derbyshire. When he died in 1868, she inherited Wirksworth Hall. Her mother lived in the hall until her death in 1892, and after this she and John moved the gates of Wirksworth Hall to Henley Hall which John had inherited in 1886. They are still there today and are shown in the photo above. They were built by the famous iron craftsman Robert Bakewell in about 1725.

The couple had four children, two sons and two daughters. When John Baddeley Wood died in 1911, his eldest son John Nicholas Price Wood (1877–1962) inherited Henley Hall. He was married twice. His first wife died in 1948, and he then married in 1949 the widow of Lieutenant General Herbert William Lumsden (née Alice Mary Roddick (1896–1990)). He had no children by either of his marriages, so when he died in 1962 he left the hall to his wife Alice, and, when she died in 1990, she left it to her son John Michael George Lumsden. It remained in the Lumsden family until 2015, when it was purchased by the current owners Dr Helen Phillips and her husband Sebastian Phillips.

== See also ==
- Grade II* listed buildings in Shropshire Council (H–Z)
- Listed buildings in Bitterley
