= Storr rock hoard =

10th-century coins found in Scotland

Storr Rock Hoard
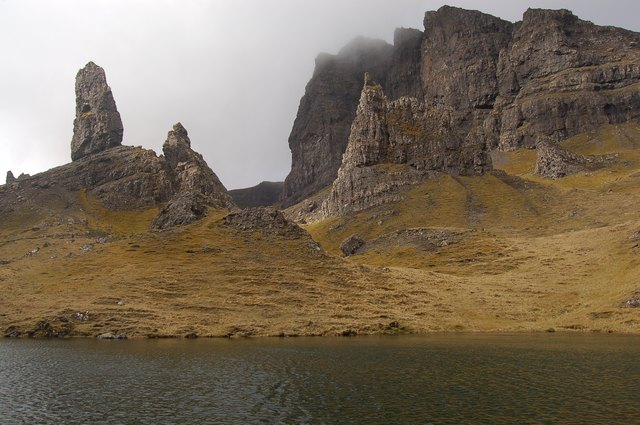
- Storr Rock, where the hoard was discovered
- Period/culture: Approx. 950 AD
- Discovered: January 1891
- Place: Storr Rock, Isle of Skye, Scotland
- Present location: National Museum of Scotland
- https://www.nms.ac.uk/explore-our-collections/stories/scottish-history-and-archaeology/storr-rock-viking-hoard/

The Storr Rock Hoard is a collection of silver coins dating from the 10th century with some originating from central Asia, found on the Isle of Skye in northern Scotland. A number of the coins have been identified as dirhams, originating from Central Asia. They have Arabic script, and are a rare find in the area, and are evidence of the extensive trade routes that were in use during the time of their origin.

== Discovery ==
In January 1891, after receiving two silver coins from the Queen's Remembrancer, Joseph Anderson, who was the keeper of the National Museum of Antiquities of Scotland at the time, ordered a deeper investigation of the site where the coins were first found. The search was successful, uncovering an additional 110 coins as well as 23 pieces of hacksilver. The mint of the coins and their conditions lead researchers to believe that the hoard was deposited around 950 AD.

== Silver dirhams ==
Of the 110 coins found, 19 have been identified as dirhams. They can be dated to 282–332 AH (anno Hegirae in the Islamic calendar), around 895–942 AD by the Christian calendar. They were minted by the Samanid dynasty, which was located in modern-day Uzbekistan. They are all uniformly the same shape, and are printed with verses from the Quran, a mint statement and attribution. These coins were rare in the area, and were most likely traded for luxury goods from Northern Europe that would have been impossible to obtain if not for the extensive trade routes at the time.

== Modern history ==
Two of the coins were initially found by a Skye inhabitant in 1890. They were passed to the Crown Office and from there to the National Museum for comment. Recognising their importance, the museum initiated a further search, which recovered the rest of the hoard as we know it. This was allocated to the museum via the treasure trove system. One coin was refashioned by the landowner into a brooch and subsequently lost. The hoard is currently on display at the National Museum of Scotland's Early Peoples Gallery.
