= Ham Green Hoard =

17th century coin hoard in Britain

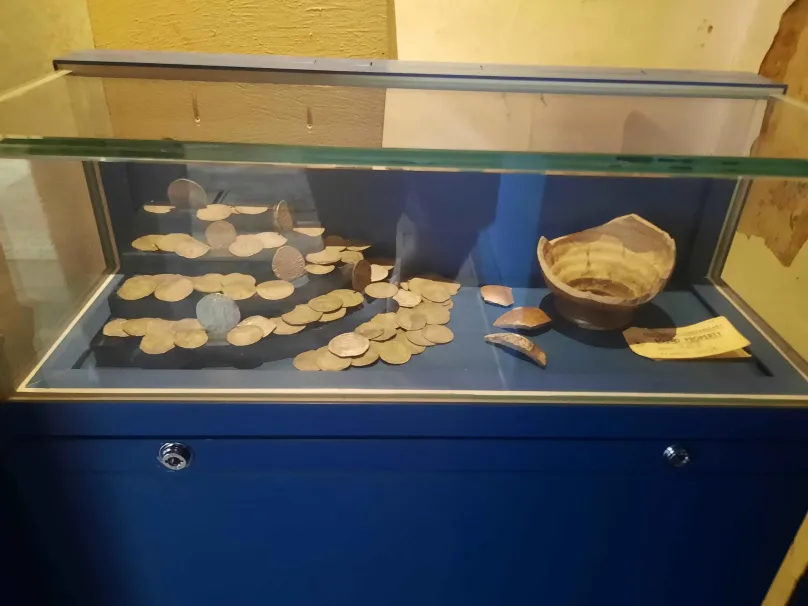
- Coins and the vase from the Ham Green Hoard
- Created: probably between 1661–62
- Period/culture: English Civil War
- Discovered: 1981; Ham Green, Worcestershire
- Present location: The Commandery, Worcester
- Coordinates: 52.260198°N 1.967239°W

The Ham Green Hoard is a hoard of silver coins dating from between 1554 and 1661–62. It is in the collection of the Museums Worcestershire and is on display at The Commandery.

== Discovery ==
The hoard was discovered in 1981 beneath the pantry floor of a cottage in Ham Green, Worcestershire, and the Ham Green Hoard was declared Treasure and acquired by the Worcestershire County Museum Service.

== Contents ==
The hoard contains 86 silver coins (mostly shillings and sixpences) and were found in a salt glazed stoneware bottle which was intentionally broken to allow larger coins to pass through.

The oldest coins date to the reign of Mary I in 1554, while the most recent coins date to the earliest part of the reign of Charles II, with several of the coins being forgeries from the 1660s.
