= Breckenbrough Hoard =

Civil War coin hoard in Britain

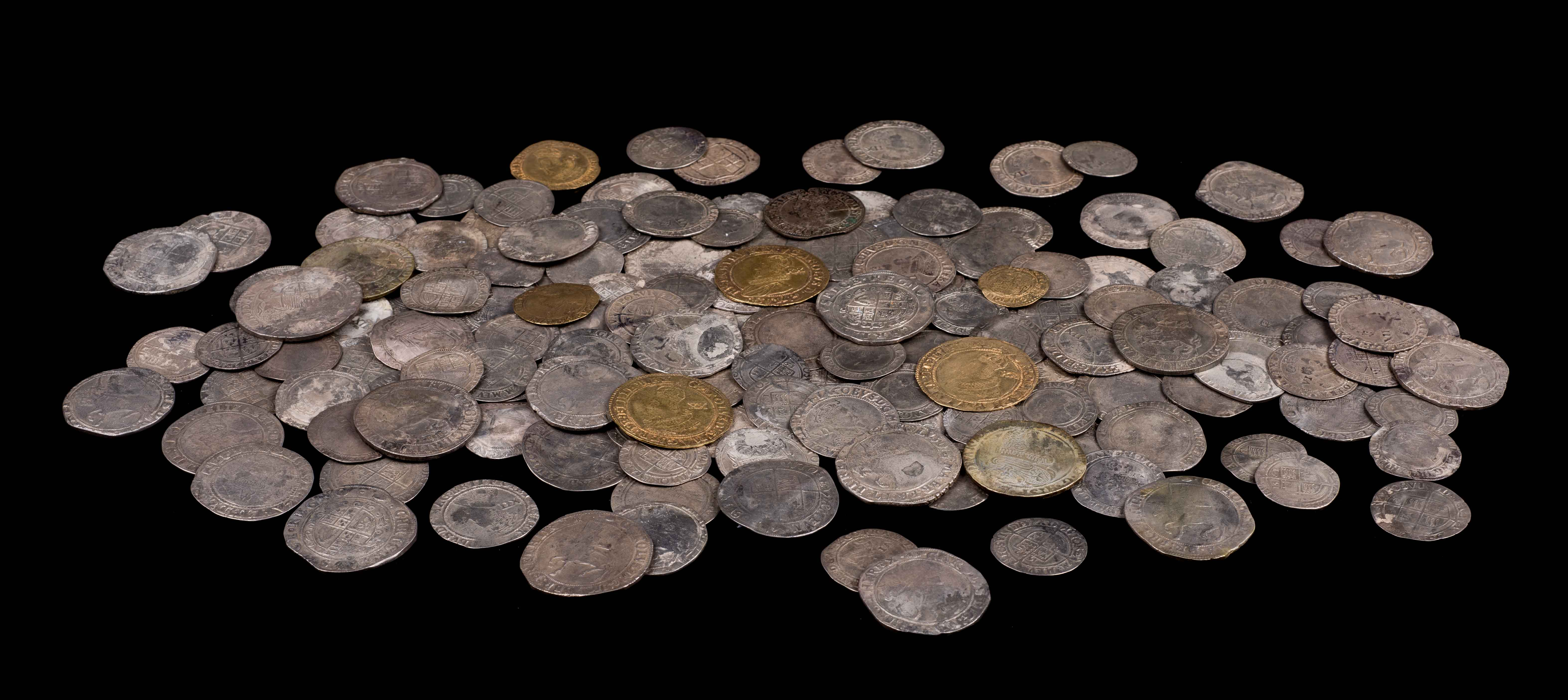
- Coins from the Breckenbrough Hoard
- Created: c. 1644
- Period/culture: English Civil War
- Discovered: June 1985; Breckenbrough, North Yorkshire
- Present location: Yorkshire Museum, York
- Coordinates: 54.246480°N 1.4271327°W
- Identification: YORYM : 1993.711

The Breckenbrough Hoard is a hoard of gold and silver coins dating from 1644, during the English Civil War. It is in the collection of the Yorkshire Museum.

== Discovery ==
The hoard was discovered by Mr. C Greensit whilst levelling ground in a covered stockyard at his farm in Breckenbrough in June 1985. The coins were still inside their ceramic vessel, which was covered by a tile and marked by a stone.

It was declared treasure trove at a coroner's inquest on 25 September 1985 and subsequently examined at the British Museum.

== Contents ==
The hoard contains 30 gold and 1552 silver coins with a total value of £93 and 5 shillings contained within a ceramic Ryedale ware vessel. Of these, 33 coins were Scottish, 35 Irish and 12 Spanish. The hoard also contained two receipts for cheese requisitioned by the Royalist Army on 17 January 1644; these receipts were signed by John Guy the deputy provider general of the York garrison.
