= Bitterley Hoard =

Archaeological discovery in Shropshire, England

Coordinates: 52.395°N 2.645°W

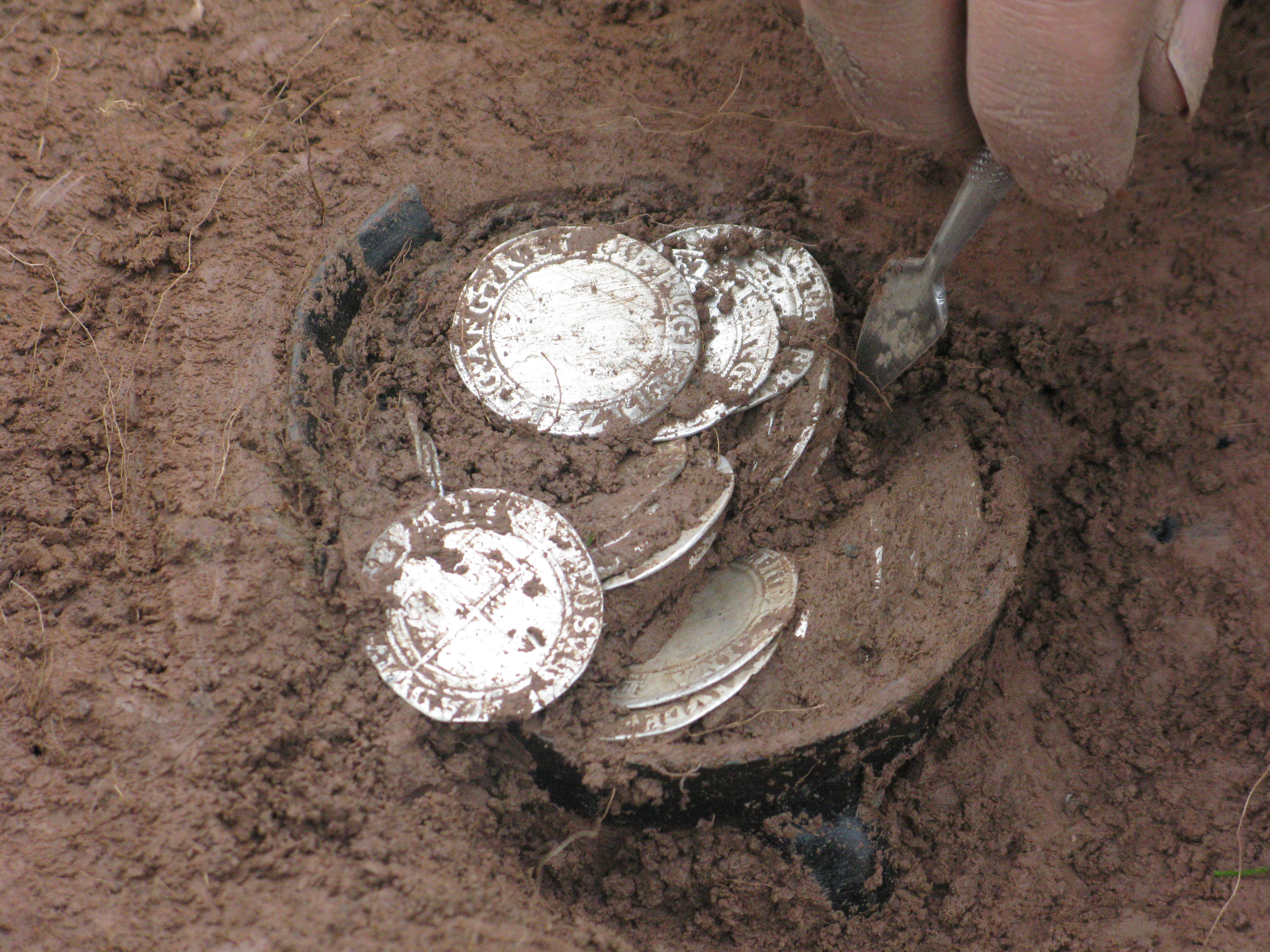
Excavation of the Bitterley Hoard

The Bitterley Hoard is the largest post medieval / English Civil War Coin Hoard found to date from Shropshire, England. It was discovered on 17 February 2011 by a metal detector user near the village of Bitterley, South Shropshire. The find consists of one gold coin and 137 high denomination silver coins. These were placed within a high quality leather purse which was contained within a pottery vessel called a tyg. The earliest coin was from the reign of Edward VI, the latest from the Bristol Provincial Mint of Charles I, indicating it was buried after early 1644.

On 28 June 2012 the coin hoard was declared as Treasure under the 1996 Treasure Act by the Coroner for Shropshire. and has been valued by the independent treasure valuation committee of the Department for Culture, Media and Sport. Shropshire Museum Service has expressed an interest in acquiring the hoard for display at Ludlow Museum. Funds are being raised via public subscription by the Friends of Ludlow Museum.
