= Littleton Powys =

Sir Littleton Powys FRS (1647?– 16 March 1732) was a Justice of the King's Bench.

== Early life and education ==
He was the eldest son of Thomas Powys of Henley Hall in Shropshire, serjeant-at-law, a Bencher of Lincoln's Inn, and the representative of one branch of the ancient Welsh family of Powys, by his first wife, Mary, daughter of Sir Adam Littleton, bart. Powys was named after his maternal grandfather.

Powys was baptised at Bitterley 27 April 1647. After leaving Shrewsbury School, he was admitted at St Edmund Hall, Oxford, in 1663, but he does not appear to have taken any degree. In the following year, he became a student of Lincoln's Inn, and in May 1671, he was called to the Bar. Littleton Powis married Agnes Carter on 3 December 1674 at the Temple Church of England, London.

== Career ==
In 1688, Powys took the side of William of Orange, reading the Prince's declaration at Shrewsbury, and, when the new government was established, was appointed a second justice on the Chester circuit in May 1689. In April 1692, he became a Serjeant-at-law and a knight, and was appointed a Baron of the Exchequer on 29 October 1695. He was transferred to the Court of King's Bench in June 1700, but did not take his seat till January 1701. While a member of this court, he was one of the majority of judges who heard the leading case Ashby v White, arising out of the Aylesbury election, and decided against the plaintiff. At the age of 78, he retired on 26 October 1726, and died in 1732. He was characterized as being a dull, respectable judge, not so able as his brother, Sir Thomas Powys, but less of a political partisan. His favourite expressions, "I humbly conceive" and "Look, do you see" were ridiculed by Philip Yorke. In 1724, he was elected a Fellow of the Royal Society, retiring from his office two years later.

== Personal life ==
Powys was patron of Bitterley Church, where in 1707 he set up a gallery at the west end, and in which he was buried after his death in 1732. His portrait hangs at the Tarlton Law Library, University of Texas at Austin.
