= Ledwyche Brook =

River in south Shropshire, England

Coordinates: 52.365°N 2.686°W

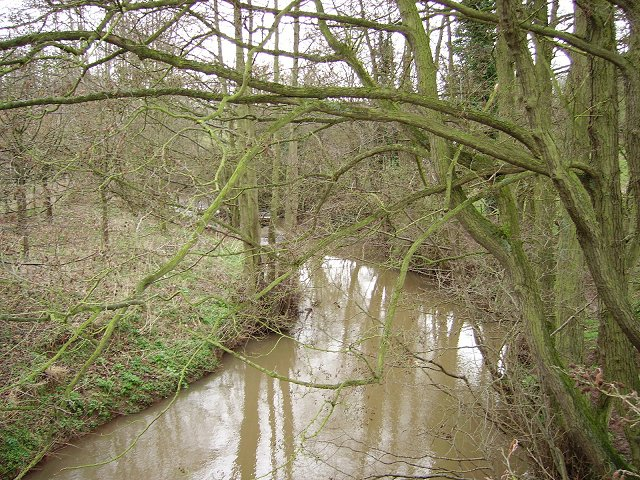
Ledwyche Brook near Caynham

Ledwyche Brook is a minor river in south Shropshire, England. It is sometimes referred to as the River Ledwyche and spelled variously, including "Ledwich" or "Ledwych". The brook is a tributary of the River Teme.

Its sources are just south of Brown Clee Hill, in the vicinity of Stoke St. Milborough, from where it flows southwest to Middleton, after which it turns southwards, passing under the A4117 road at Henley, where it passes by Henley Hall. The B4364 road runs along the Ledwyche valley from its junction with the A4117 to where it runs around Brown Clee Hill.

The river avoids the River Teme at Ludlow, running instead to the east of the town, resulting in a peninsula of land one mile 1 mile (1.6 km) wide between the two watercourses, at the Sheet. Ledwyche Brook then flows in a southeast direction, passing through Caynham and afterwards passing to the west of Greete.

It finally discharges into the Teme at Burford. Just before its confluence the A456 road bridges the brook. For approximately 3.5 miles (5.6 km) between Caynham and Burford the brook forms the border between the counties of Shropshire and Herefordshire. The tripoint between the counties of Shropshire, Herefordshire and Worcestershire is just upstream of the Teme from the confluence.

Two small settlements, separated by some distance, are named after the brook – Upper Ledwyche and Lower Ledwyche; with Ledwyche deriving from a personal name (Leoda) and wīc which means dwelling place.

The Elan aqueduct (which carries drinking water to Birmingham from Wales) crosses the Ledwyche just downstream from the Sheet.
