= Tyg =

English pottery mug

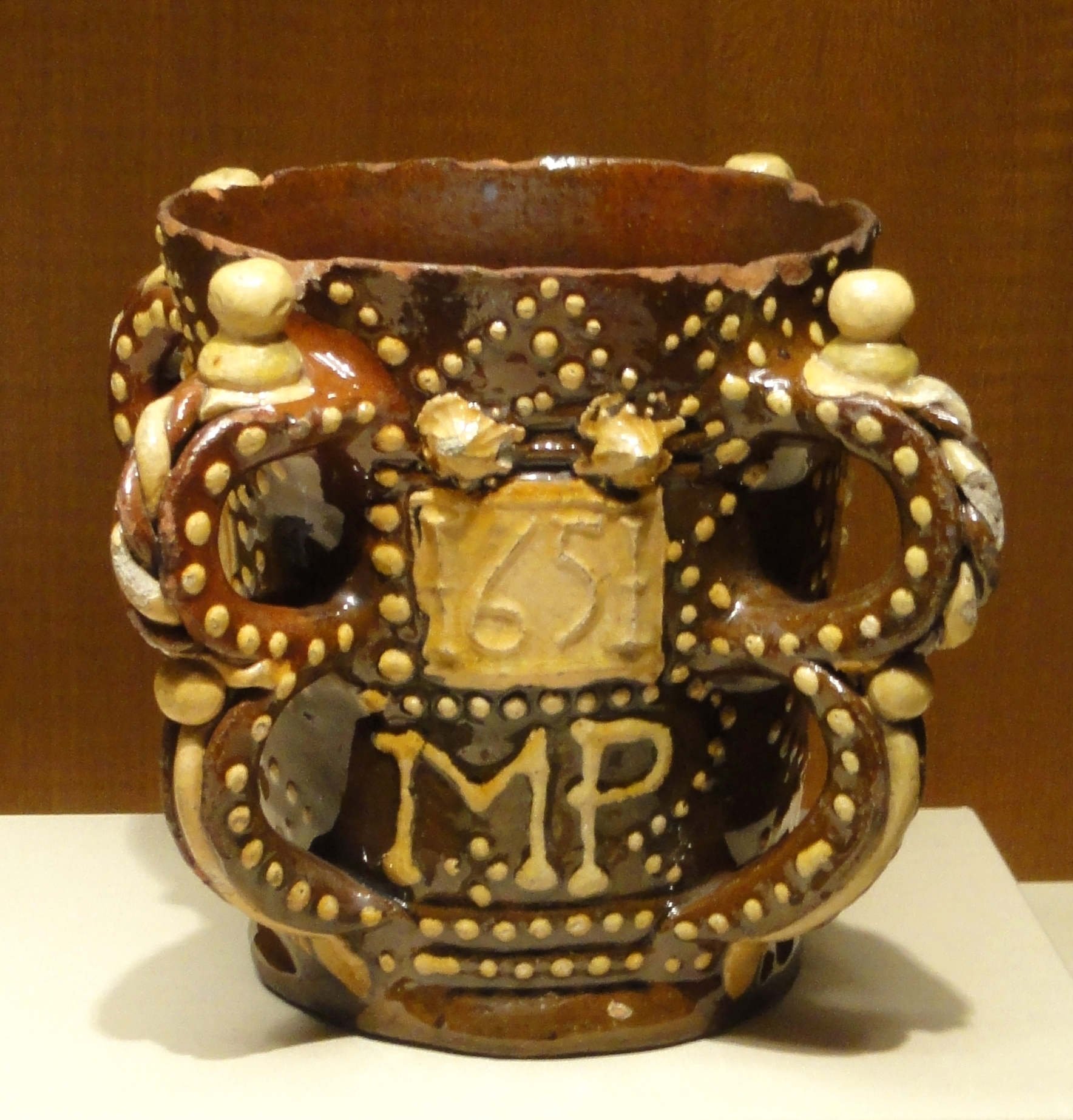
Tyg made by George Richardson, Wrotham, Kent, dated 1651

A tyg (or tig) is a large English pottery mug with three or more handles dividing the rim into sections for several drinkers. These tall, black-glazed, red-bodied drinking vessels were produced from the 15th century through the first half of the 17th century, peaking in popularity during the 16th and 17th centuries. Some were made with as many as nine handles. The multiple handles also allow hot drinks to be passed around without pain.

Tygs were made in large quantities at Wrotham in Kent and in many Staffordshire factories. Examples have surfaced at 17th-century American colonial sites, as well as in the UK. There are also examples of Japanese and German tygs.

Many of the leading names in Staffordshire and Worcester area have manufactured miniature three handled tygs that stand proud at only 1 to 1 7/10 inches in size. Most were probably used for decoration rather than drinking, as many of them are exquisitely painted. They are widely collected. A series of 750 was made by Stephen Parry-Thomas both to mark and be part of the final firing of a Bottle oven.

== Frilly-based tyg ==
The term 'frilly-based tyg' is used in some English archaeological literature to refer to a type of medieval and early post-medieval drinking mug or pitcher, usually wheel-thrown with a rounded belly and a straight or flared neck, which may have one or more handles. The 'frilly base' refers to the foot-ring of the mug, which after throwing was given an alternating bossed and indented form by manual shaping with fingers or thumbs. This style was popularized from c. 1300 onwards in hard-fired Rhenish wares, for example in ash-glazed wares from Siegburg, near Bonn, Germany, and later in salt-glazed wares like those from Raeren, eastern Belgium. These were imported to England in large quantities and were imitated in English stoneware and earthenware.
