= Mosque lamp =

Islamic architecture glass

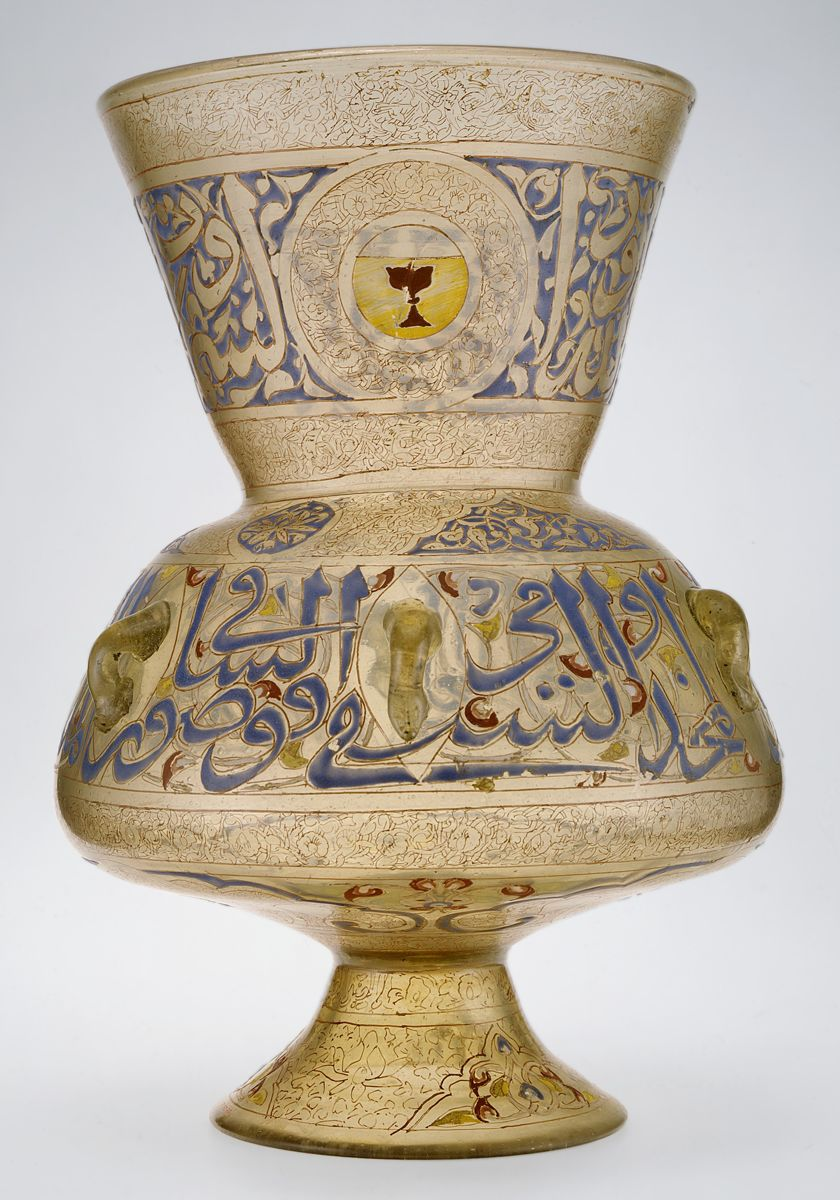
Egyptian enamelled glass mosque lamp made for Amir Qawsun, ca. 1329–1335

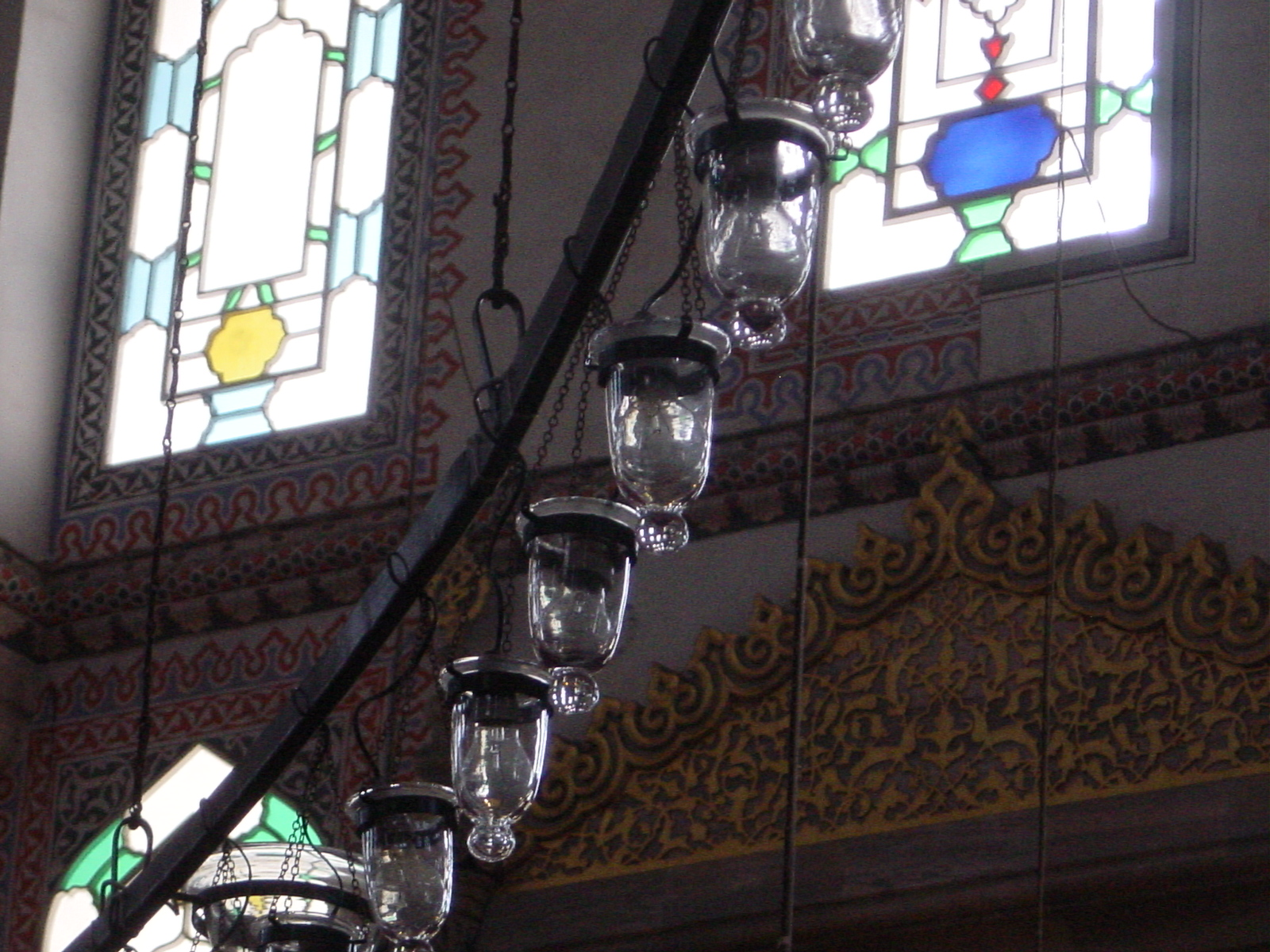
The later plain type hanging in Istanbul

Fine mosque lamps are usually made of enamelled glass, often with gilding. They are oil lamps, usually with a large round body and a narrower neck that flares towards the top. They were often made with internal containers to be filled with oil and a wick to produce light. Some were also made in Islamic pottery, though this was much less efficient for actual lighting.

There was usually a foot so they could be placed on a surface, but they were normally hung by a circular metal frame and suspended by chains that went through a number of loops on the outside of the body. The circular frames continue to be used in many mosques today, but with plain or frosted glass lamps for electric lighting. These lamps were used to light mosques, and at times were used in rituals during Ramadan. In one such ritual, the flame of the lamp would be extinguished to signal to people that prayer was about to start. In big mosques it was common to see thousands of lamps being used to illuminate the space.

Oil lamps were introduced gradually into mosques and took time until they became common, which was around the end of the 7th century and the beginning of the 8th century. They survive in considerable numbers from the Middle Ages, especially the 13th and 14th centuries, with Cairo in Egypt and Aleppo and Damascus in Syria being the most important centres of production.

There were also smaller, usually plain, glass lamps, with a cup-like shape and a lip at the top. These were used in larger numbers in a frame with holders.

== Manufacture ==
The techniques used are typical of contemporary Islamic glass, with the enamel decoration applied to a pre-fired plain body, and the whole then fired for a second time. The coloured decoration may include Qur'anic verses, especially the first part of the Ayat an-Nur or "Verse of Light" (24:35, see below), inscriptions and heraldic emblems recording the donor, as well as purely decorative motifs. By the 15th century production of all types of fine glass was in steep decline, a sign of which is that in 1569 the Ottoman Grand Vizier Sokullu Mehmed Pacha ordered 600 plain lamps of Venetian glass, perhaps to be decorated elsewhere.

The Ottomans also made lamps of similar form in Iznik pottery, and Shah Abbas I of Persia gave plain silver lamps to hang by the tomb of Shaykh Safi at Ardabil; Persian miniatures show other examples from the 16th century in gold or brass and silver. Such opaque materials were much less effective as lighting, but the purpose of the lamp was symbolic as well as practical, related to the "Verse of Light". Mosque lamps are often shown in profile at the head of a prayer rug for the same reason. The decoration of the lamps often includes either the name or the symbol from Islamic heraldry of the donor, who usually gave a group of lamps. Other types of lighting in mosques were large metal lamp stands, like very wide candlesticks, which were also used in secular buildings. These could be very intricately decorated.

== Later types ==
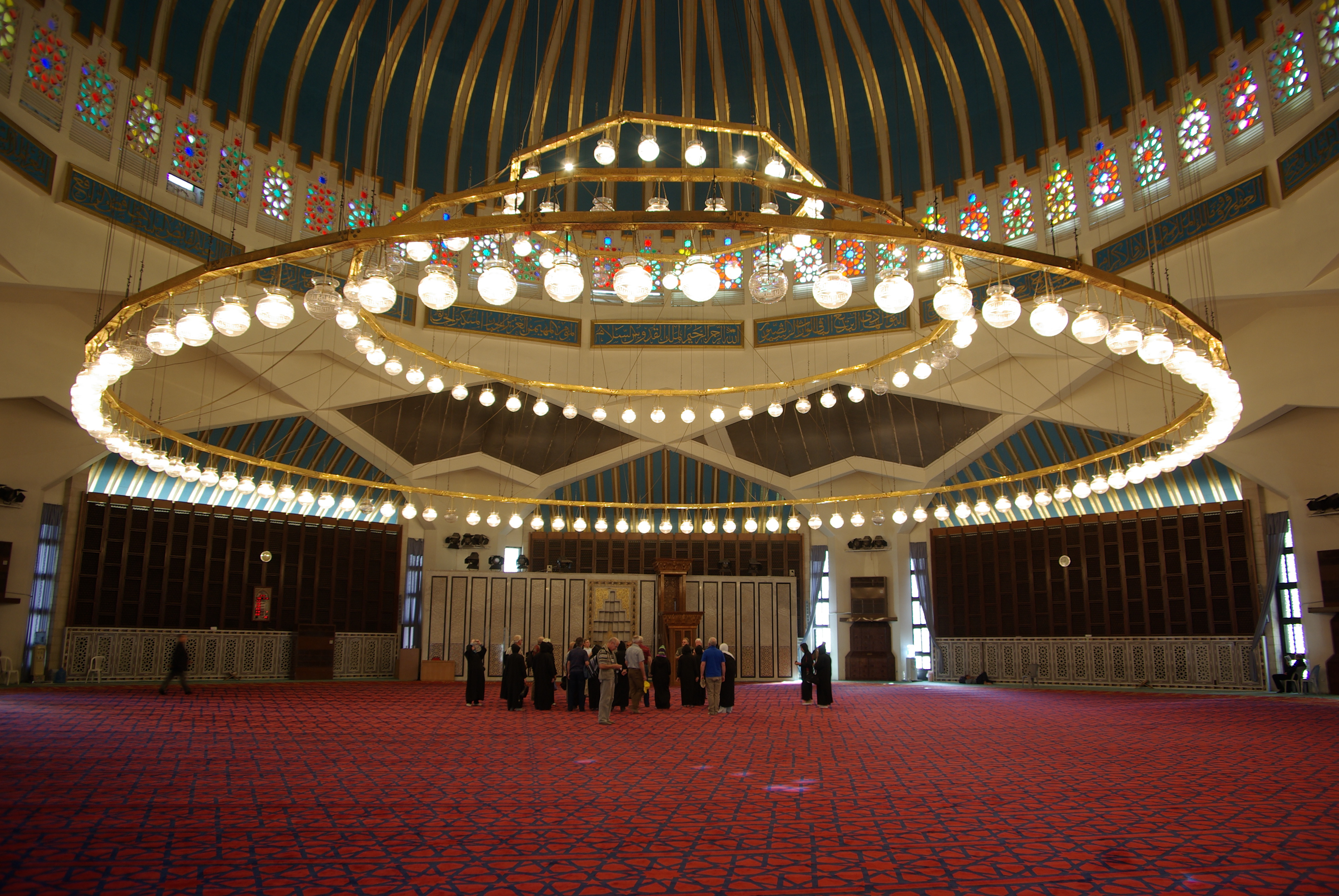
Modern electric lighting in Amman

The elaborately decorated types were mostly succeeded by plain glass oil lamps with a simple rim at the top, by which they were attached to (typically) a circular metal bar. Often these hang in tiers. Mosques today typically retain the hanging circular fittings, but use electric lights and glass shades of various sorts, not essentially different from other glass lampshades used in lighting other buildings.

== Collecting ==
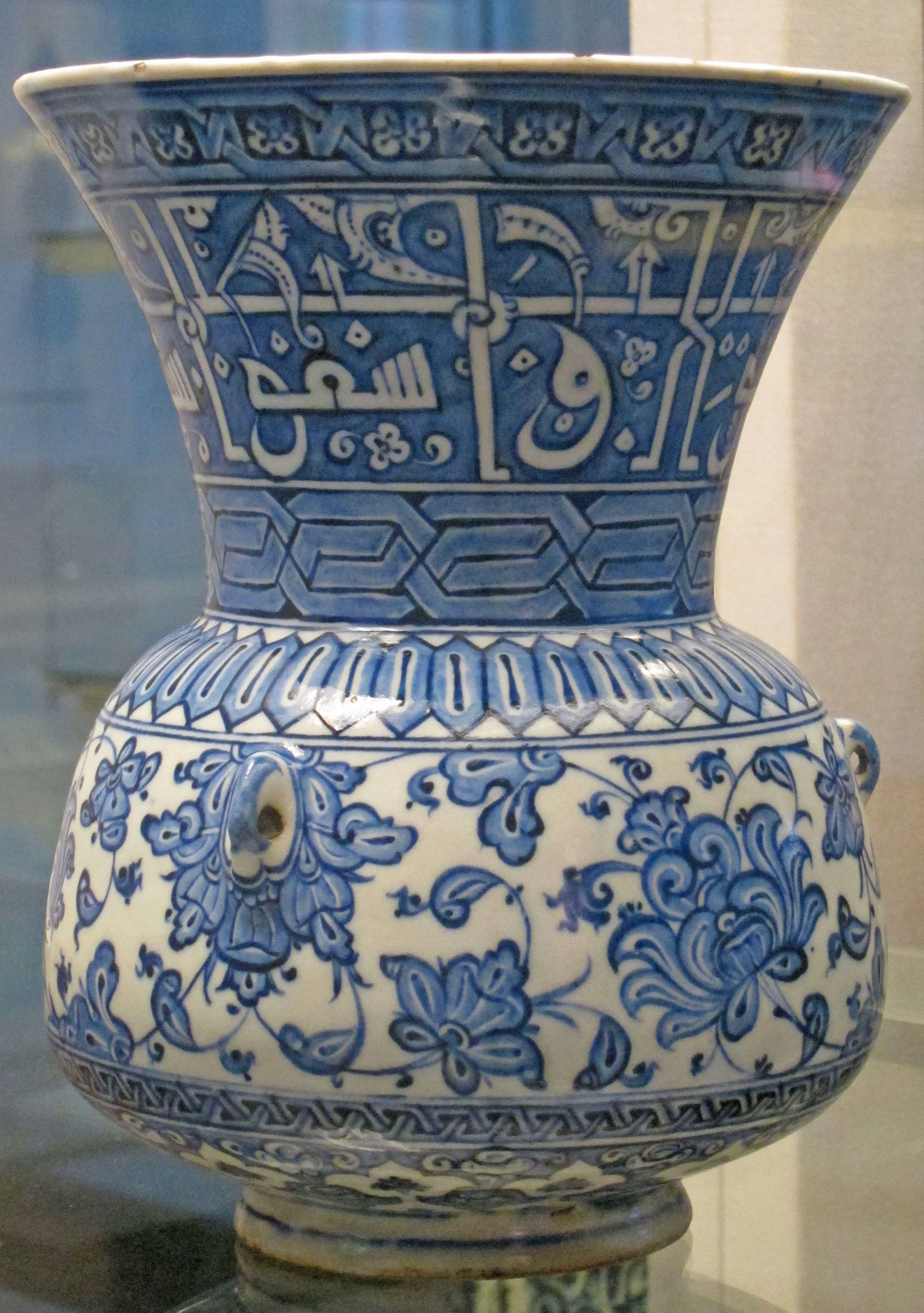
İznik pottery lamp with lotuses c. 1510. Similar to four lamps that hung in the mausoleum of Bayezid II in Istanbul

In 2000, three 14th-century Mamluk mosque lamps in pristine condition from the collection of Bethsabée de Rothschild sold at Christie's in London for £1,763,750 (US$2,582K), £993,750 (US$1,455K) and £641,750 (US$937K). In the second half of the 19th century, a number of forgeries, or expensive glass ornaments in the style of Mamluk lamps were produced in France and Italy.

== The Verse of Light ==
Qur'an 24:35:

:God is the Light of the heavens and the earth.

The Parable of His Light is as if there were a Niche and within it a Lamp
the Lamp enclosed in Glass: the glass as it were a brilliant star
Lit from a blessed Tree, an Olive, neither of the east nor of the West,
whose oil is well-nigh luminous, though fire scarce touched it
Light upon Light! God doth guide whom He will to His Light
God doth set forth Parables for men: and God doth know all things.
