= Swan-neck bottle =

Iranian ornamental glass bottles

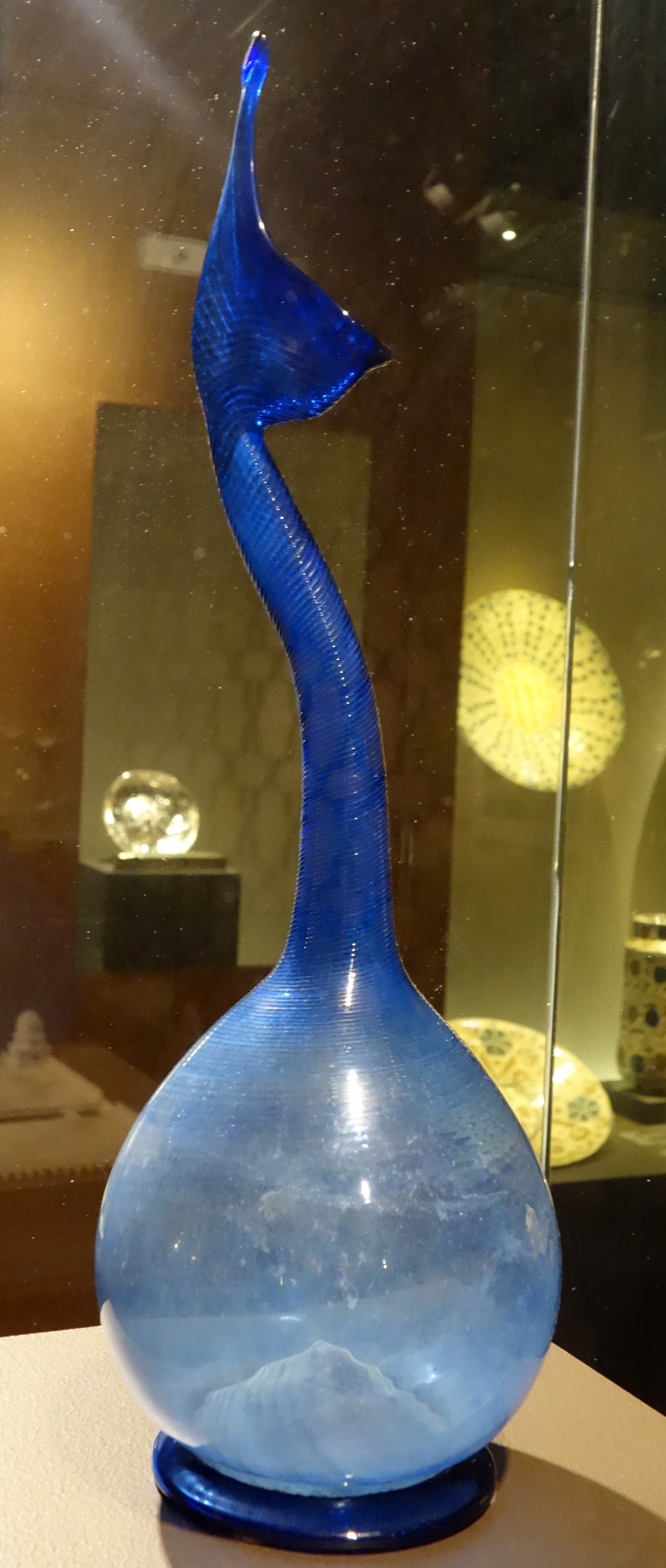
18th or 19th century swan-neck bottle, Montreal Museum of Fine Arts

Swan-neck bottles, also referred to as ashkdān in Persian, are a type of ornamental glass bottle made in Iran, characterized by their long neck.

These bottles are the best-known examples of an Iranian glassware tradition that began under the reign of Shah Abbas I (1587–1629), notably in Shiraz and Isfahan, and which was inspired by 16th-century Venetian glassware imported into the Muslim world. Paintings from the Safavid period indicate that the bottles were used to hold wine or other beverages, or to adorn wall niches, although the bottles seen in paintings are straight-necked bottles. Folklore has it that they were also used as rose water sprinklers and to collect the tears of wives separated from their husbands, hence the Persian appellation ashkdān, "container for tears". There is no generally accepted explanation for the particular shape and length of these bottles' neck.

In the 19th century, many swan-neck bottles were collected by European travellers and brought to Europe, where they were much in demand. They are still being produced in Iran.
