= Cisjordan Corpus =

Hoard of Phoenician hacksilver

The Cisjordan corpus of Phoenician Iron Age hacksilber (hacksilver), dated between 1200 and 586 BC, is the largest identified collection of pre-coinage silver in the ancient Near East. The corpus was identified by Christine Marie Thompson in 2003. The corpus is composed of 34 silver hoards found at 15 sites in ancient southern Phoenicia or modern Israel and Israeli-occupied territories, this area is termed "Cisjordan". Significant hoards have been found at Tel Dor, Eshtemoa, Tell Keisan, Ein Hofez, and Akko. The other hoards were found at Megiddo (see: Megiddo treasure), Bet Shean, Shechem, Shiloh, Gezer, Tel Miqne-Ekron, Ashkelon, Ajjul, Ein Gedi, and Arad.

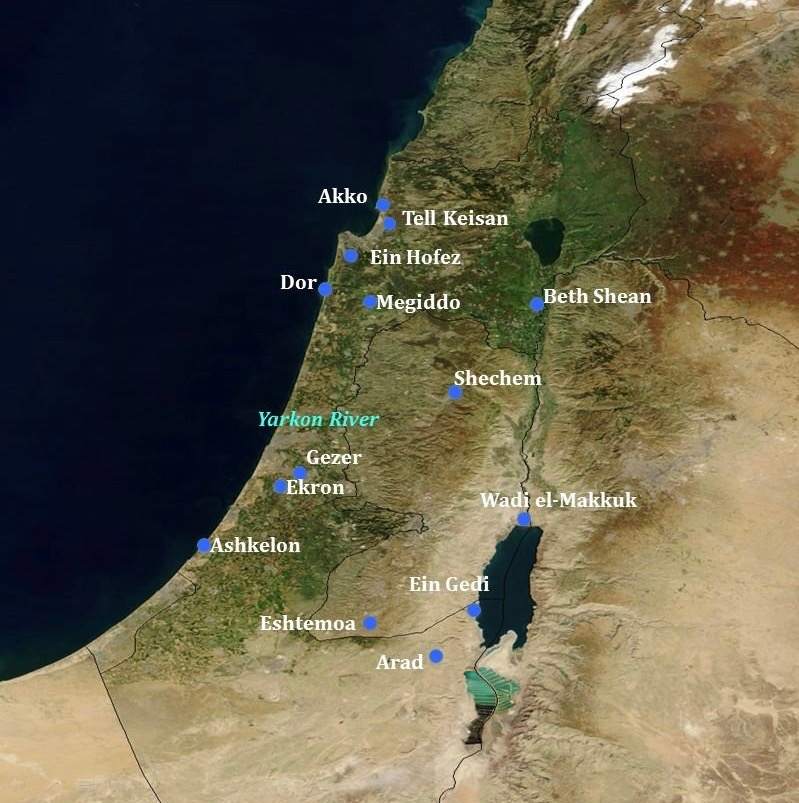
Find spots of the Cisjordan Corpus. (Ajjul and Shiloh not marked.)

== Significance ==
The Cisjordan corpus is the largest concentration of silver hoards that has been discovered in the Near East. These 34 hoards occur in a region that has no native source of silver, meaning that it was likely all imported from other locations. This corpus is thought to be evidence of the Phoenician trade with the Biblical Western Mediterranean Island of Tarshish which supplied King Solomon with silver. The lead isotope ratios in the ores match those native to Sardinia and Spain. This has caused scholars to consider Sardinia as a possible match for the legendary Tarshish.

== Use as currency ==
This collection of silver is thought to demonstrate the conceptual basis of monetary coinage. CM Thompson considered unweighted hacksilber as "currency," weighted pieces or bundles of hacksilber as "money," and standard weighted bundles of hacksilber, sror kesep, sealed with bullae in a cloth sack as "coins." Adhering to this concept requires accepting the inference that the silver was packaged in pre-weighed bundles, chopped from pre-portioned ingots, and sealed to denote confirmation of quality and quantity. There is no evidence that ingots were pre-weighed. If this is true, then numismatic activity was established in the ancient Near East long before Greek and Lydian adaptation in 6th century. This has led scholars to believe that the Greek preference for silver may be partly linked to this ancient Mediterranean trade. Eshel et al., argues that the invention of coinage negates by definition the hacksilber currency system, which was based on quality control as well as constant weighing. Eshel demonstrates this by showing that the weight of the silver items and bundles were un-standardized, that the many small silver items were used to balance the weight, and that silver was repeatedly hacked.

== Types ==
Objects that are considered hacksilber may take many forms and uses including ornamentation (jewelry or decoration) or raw material (to make into other things, like jewelry). Listed and described below are shapes and forms that hacksilber commonly takes.

=== Chocolate Bar Ingots ===
- Possible meaning of the biblical Hebrew "kesitah" which is currently thought to translate to "a portion".
- Thought to be used to make purchases
- What is thought by some to be the oldest known counterfeit currency is a chocolate bar ingot from Bet Shean. The specimen is a silver ingot with copper core.

=== Jewelry and Fragments ===
- Whole pieces of jewelry or fragments
- Fully intact jewelry pieces may still be considered hacksilber because the silver itself, and the added value through labor and design, is stored wealth.

=== Coiled Rings ===
- Thin rods of silver were coiled into cylinders and amounts would be cut off as needed.
- They are often identified as rings, hair rings, or bracelets.

=== Rolled Tongues / Folded Ingots ===
- Rolled tongues look like flat circular pieces that have been bent into a cylinder. Though they look like beads there is no evidence that they were worn as jewelry.
- This type is less common than the others.
- They have been found among the hoards at Tel Migne-Ekron

== See also ==
- Phoenicia
- Tarshish
- Hacksilver

== See also ==
- Haselgrove, Colin; Krmnicek, Stefan (2012). "The Archaeology of Money". Annual Review of Anthropology. 41: 235–250. doi:10.1146/annurev-anthro-092611-145716. JSTOR 23270709.
- Master, Daniel M. (November 2014). "Economy and Exchange in the Iron Age Kingdoms of the Southern Levant". Bulletin of the American Schools of Oriental Research. 372: 81–97. doi:10.5615/bullamerschoorie.372.0081. S2CID 164382849.
- Kim, Henry S.; Kroll, John H. (2008). "A Hoard of Archaic Coins of Colophon and Unminted Silver (CH I.3)". American Journal of Numismatics. 20: 53–103. JSTOR 43580305.
- Gilboa, Ayelet (2015). "Dor and Egypt in the early Iron Age: an archaeological perspective of (part of) the Wenamun Report". Ägypten und Levante. 25: 247–274. doi:10.1553/AEundL25s247. JSTOR 43795214.
- Balmuth, Miriam S., ed. (2001). Hacksilber to Coinage: New Insights Into the Monetary History of the Near East and Greece. American Numismatic Society. ISBN 978-0-89722-281-5.
