= Bedale Hoard =

Treasure hoard found in North Yorkshire, England

Coordinates: 54.29°N 1.59°W

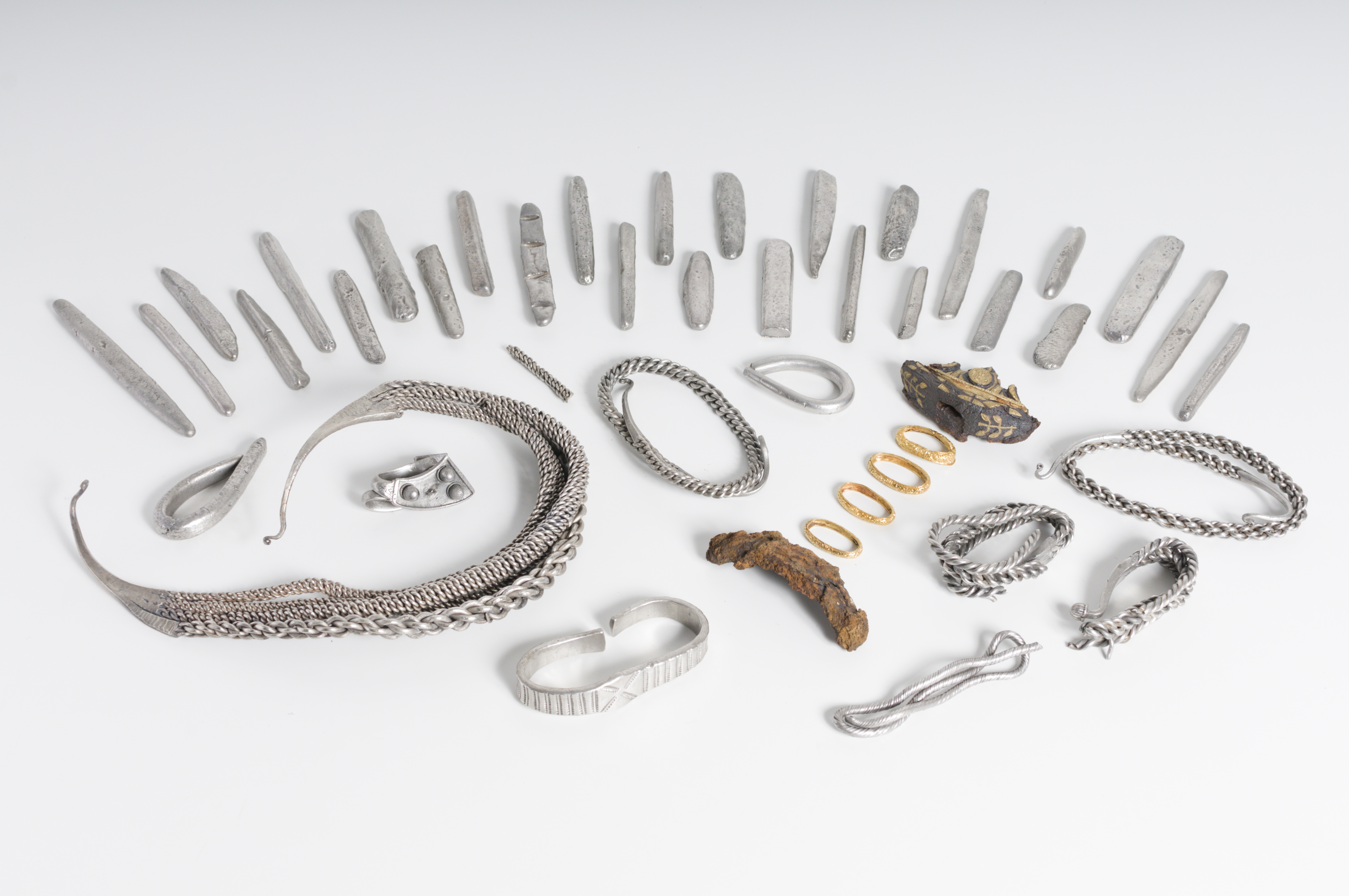
- The Bedale Hoard
- Created: 850–900 AD (deposited)
- Period/culture: Viking
- Discovered: 2012; Bedale, North Yorkshire
- Present location: Medieval Gallery, Yorkshire Museum, York
- Identification: YORYM: 2014.149 YORYM-CEE620

The Bedale Hoard is a hoard of forty-eight silver and gold items dating from the late 9th to early 10th centuries AD and includes necklaces, arm-bands, a sword pommel, hacksilver and ingots. It was discovered on 22 May 2012 in a field near Bedale, North Yorkshire, by metal detectorists, and reported via the Portable Antiquities Scheme. Following a successful public funding campaign, the hoard was acquired by the Yorkshire Museum for £50,000.

== Contents ==
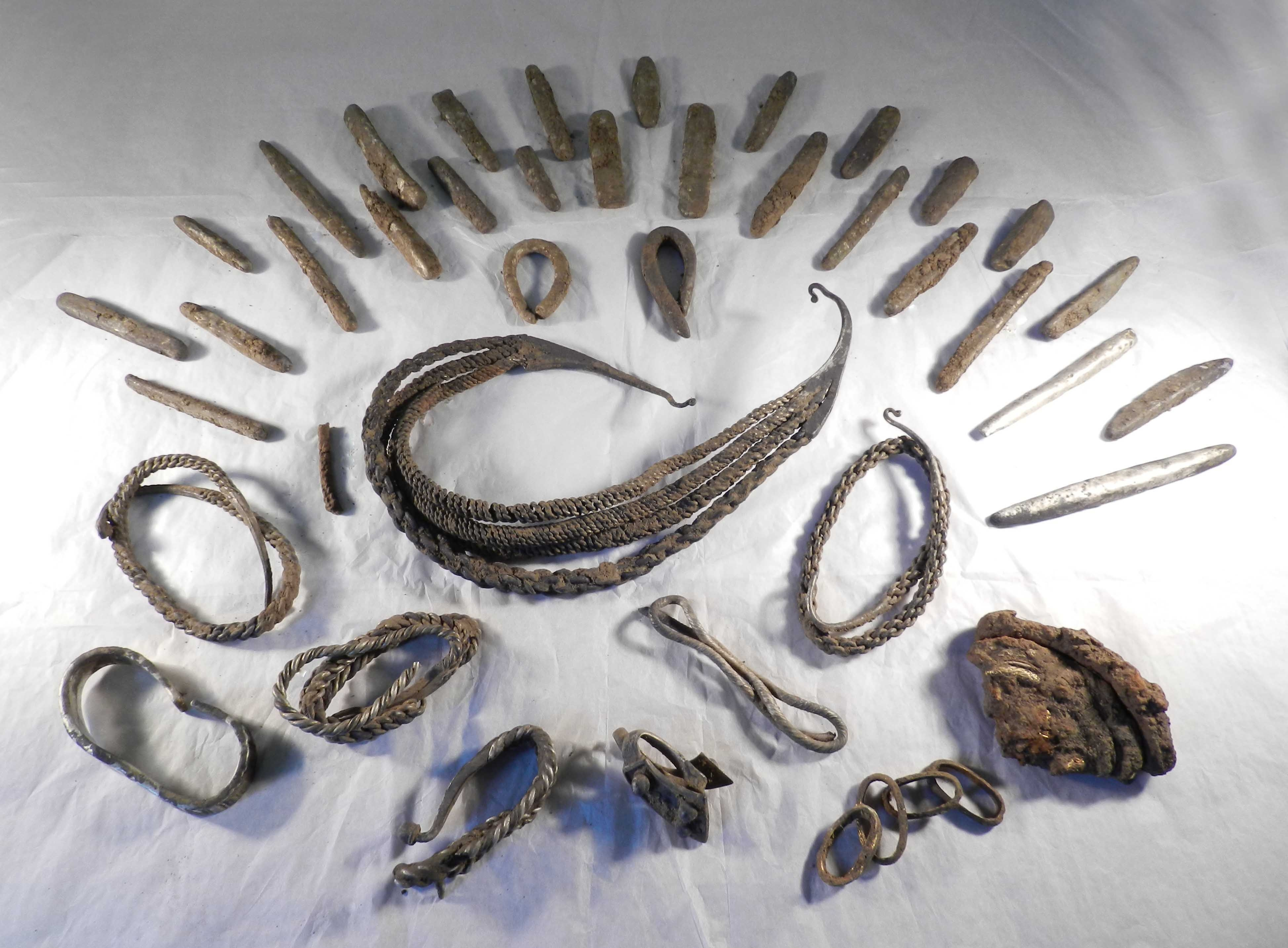
The hoard before cleaning

The hoard contains 48 items of silver and gold and was declared "treasure" under the Treasure Act 1996. In addition to 29 silver ingots, the hoard contained an iron sword pommel inlaid with foil plaques, four gold hoops or bands from the hilt of the sword, six small gold rivets, four silver collars and neck-rings (one cut into two pieces), one silver arm, one fragment of a "Permian" ring, and one silver penannular brooch.

=== Sword fittings ===
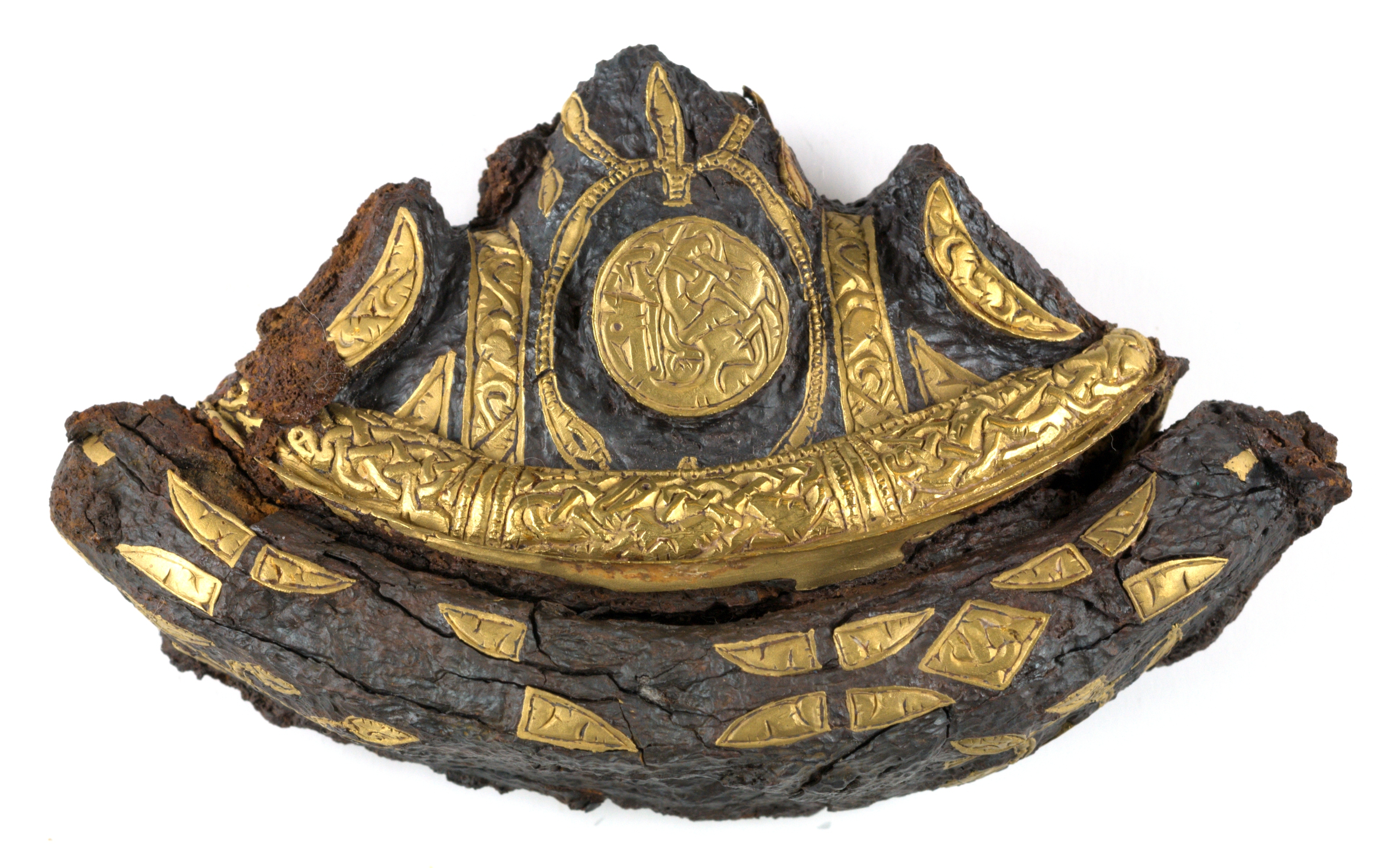
Sword pommel from the Bedale hoard, inlaid with gold foil

The large, iron sword pommel survived along with the guard, four gold hoops from the hilt and six gold rivets. The pommel is broadly triangular and is inlaid with plaques of gold foil decorated with incised animal interlace with nicked edges in the late Anglo-Saxon Trewhiddle style, which can be dated to the late 9th century. The form of the pommel is typical of Petersen's late-9th-century type L. Silver is far more usual as a decoration on sword pommels of this date and the extensive use of gold foil on the present find is unique.

=== Neck-rings ===
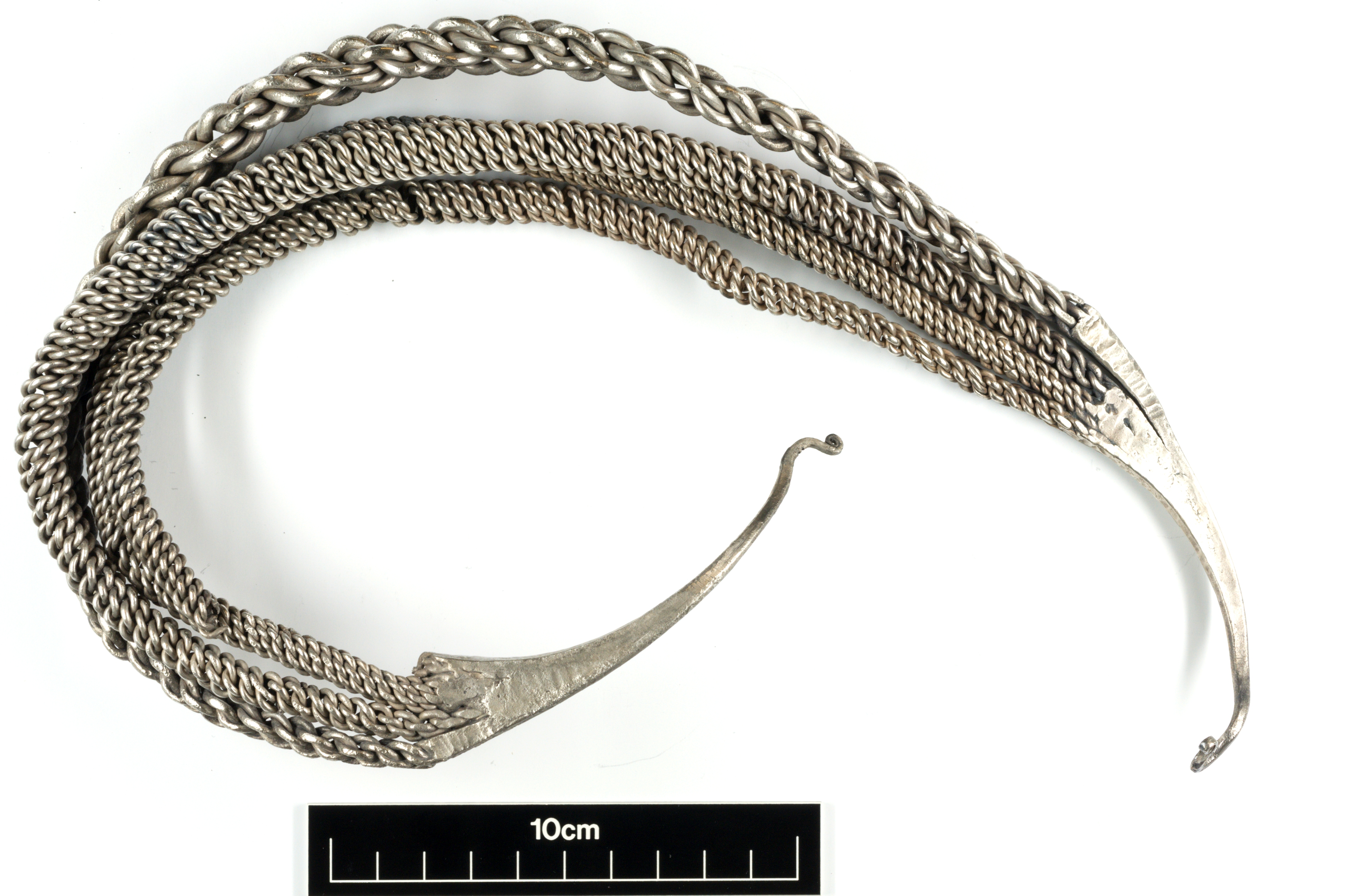
Large silver neck-ring from the Bedale hoard. This is a unique example of this type.

The largest neck collar from the hoard consists of four twisted cables of silver, each a different size, hammer-welded together into flat terminals. The outermost cable consists of six thick, plaited rods and the inner three "hollow" ropes each consists only of three coiled strands of double-twisted rods. Whilst the individual components of the collar can be paralleled, this "West Viking" variant is unique. International trade associated with this hoard is best demonstrated by the "Permian"-style ring fragment, a type imported from Russia during the early part of the Viking period. Two complete six-plait cable neck-rings are also present in the hoard, as is a triple-strand neck-ring cut into half and used as hacksilver.

=== Ingots ===
Twenty-nine ingots of silver (with a variety of minor alloys) were found with the hoard, many of which have testing-nicks. Three have crosses incised upon them. They range from 40 to 146 grams (1.4 to 5.1 oz) in weight.

== Significance ==
The hoard represents the scale of international connections in the early medieval period, with Russian and Irish influences among the Anglo-Saxon and Anglo-Scandinavian elements. The lack of coinage in this hoard shows the bullion-weight economy in use in the late 9th century AD. It is earlier than both the Cuerdale Hoard and the Vale of York Hoard.

Research undertaken by Jane Kershaw analysed the silver of the hoard using X-ray fluorescence, Inductively coupled plasma mass spectrometry and magnetically-coupled plasma mass spectrometry in order to establish the ratios of lead-isotopes in the metal. Lead was used in the cupellation of silver. This research has established that the refined silver in the hoard derived from at least different sources: a British source, a French source, and a group that combined British lead with a silver from an eastern source in the Islamic middle-east.

== Public display ==
The hoard was first placed on permanent public display in the Yorkshire Museum in 2014. From 2017 it formed part of a touring exhibition titled 'Viking: Rediscover the Legend' and is displayed alongside the Vale of York Hoard and the Cuerdale Hoard, with the tour starting at the Yorkshire Museum and subsequently including Atkinson Art Gallery and Library in Southport, Aberdeen Art Gallery, Norwich Castle Museum, and the University of Nottingham. It was included in public display in the Viking North exhibition at the Yorkshire Museum when this opened in July 2025.

== See also ==
- List of hoards in Great Britain
- Anglo-Saxon art
- Cuerdale Hoard
- Northumbria
- Vale of York Hoard
