= Hedwig glass =

Type of glass beaker

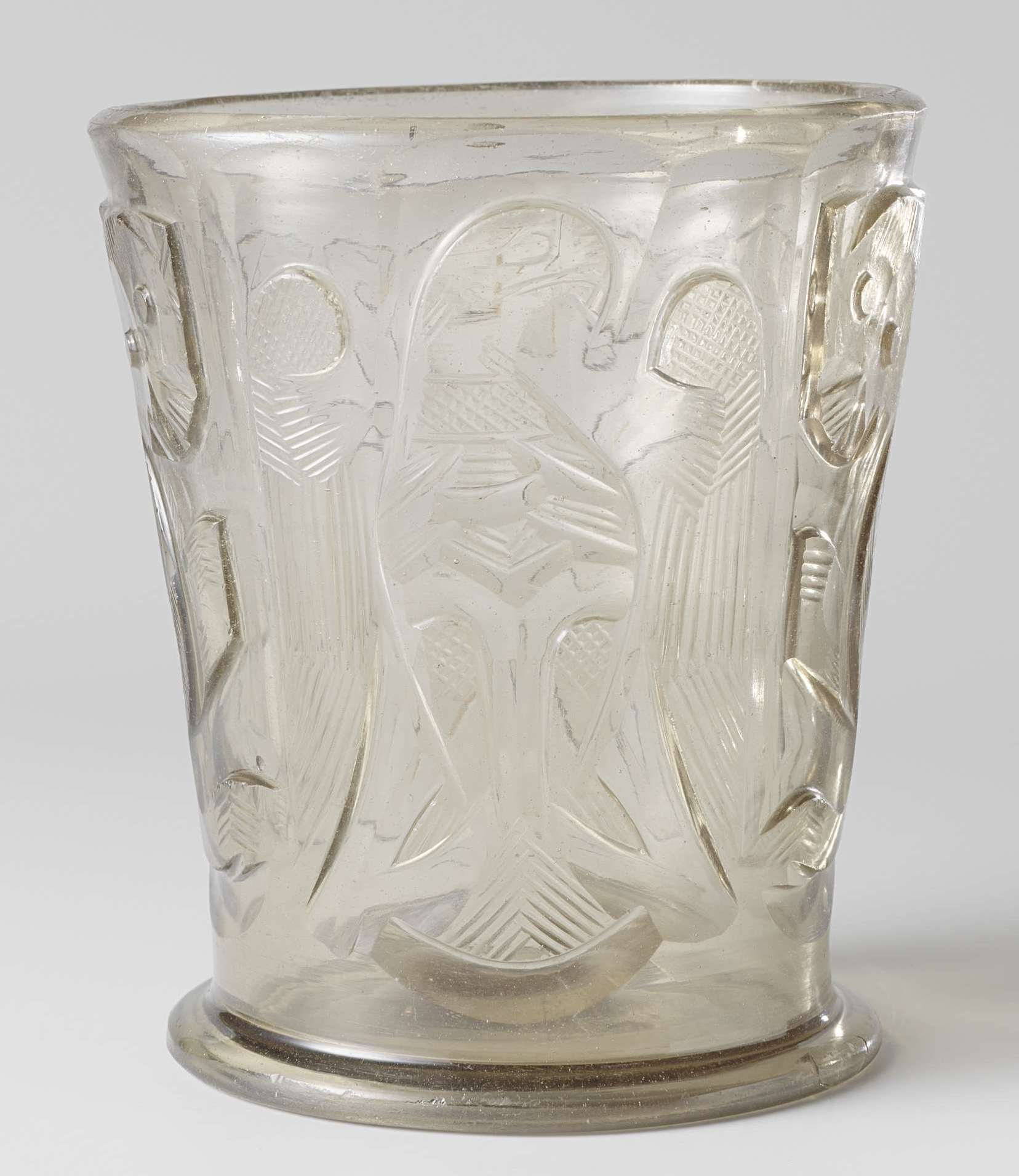
Hedwig glass with eagle, Rijksmuseum, wheel-cut relief with hatched details

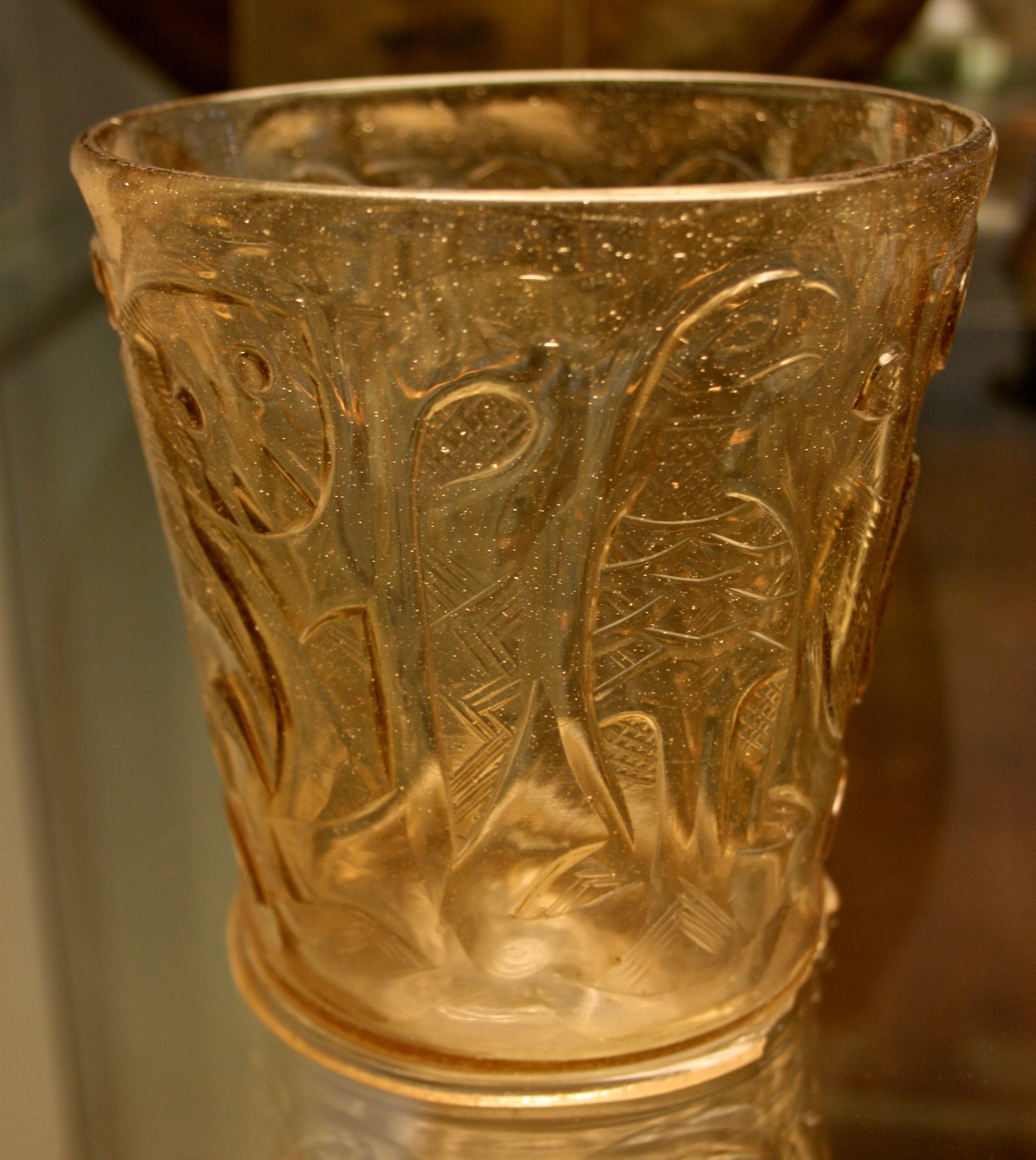
The Hedwig beaker at the British Museum

Hedwig glasses or Hedwig beakers are a type of glass beaker originating in the Middle East or Norman Sicily and dating from the 10th–12th centuries AD. They are named after the Silesian princess Saint Hedwig (1174–1245), to whom three of them are traditionally said to have belonged. So far, a total of 14 complete glasses are known. The exact origin of the glasses is disputed, with Egypt, Iran and Syria all suggested as possible sources; if they are not of Islamic manufacture they are certainly influenced by Islamic glass. Probably made by Muslim craftsmen, some of the iconography is Christian, suggesting they may have been made for export or for Christian clients. The theory that they instead originate from Norman Sicily in the 11th century was first fully set out in a book in 2005 by Rosemarie Lierke, and has attracted some support from specialists.

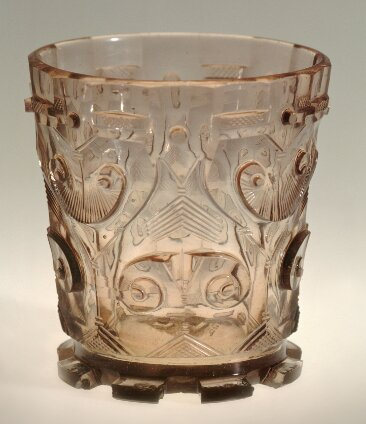
Glass owned by Martin Luther, now in the Veste Coburg collection

All 14 of the complete Hedwig glasses so far known have roughly the same form: they are squat, thick-walled and straight-sided with a flange around the base. They are around 14 cm high and have a diameter of nearly 14 cm. All but one are richly decorated with wheel-cut relief with hatched details.

The glasses are mostly of a smoky metal colour with a couple of greenish or yellowish glass. The decorations are in two styles: four have abstract decorations derived from Samarra Style C; another eight have zoomorphic decorations of lions, griffins and eagles and palm trees.

== Context ==
They were probably made in emulation of the rock crystal carved vessels made in Fatimid Egypt rather earlier, which were objects of great luxury in the Middle Ages, and have also mostly survived in church treasuries.; an example can be seen in the Treasury of St Mark's Basilica in Venice, which also possesses a rock-crystal ewer in the same style. A number of the glasses were elaborated into reliquaries, or in one case a chalice, during the Middle Ages, with the addition of goldsmith's work, including those at Namur, Krakow and Halberstadt (see below). Lierke suggests that notches in the bases of many indicate that they were originally given other metalwork settings, perhaps as chalices, but none of these have survived. Seven of the known Hedwig glasses have 13th- to 15th-century metal mounts.

== Design ==
The appearance of the Hedwig beakers resembles rock crystal, or quartz, and they are made of soda ash glass, which is composed of plant ash and quartz sand. Although no two look exactly alike, all have a similar conical shape, thick walls, and wheel-cut ornament. The beakers differ both in size, ranging from 8 to 15 centimeters, and also in colour, with some being ash grey, others golden yellow, and also green. Their decoration seems to fall into two distinct groups: the first depicts plant and animals, including eagles, lions, griffins, almonds, and palm trees. The second set of beakers incorporates palmettes, crescents, geometric shapes, as well as vegetation into the exterior design. These ornamentations are in quite high relief, meaning they are raised from the surface, and give the beakers a sculptural appearance. Furthermore, all the beakers have engraved parallel lines cut into them, that work with the translucent nature of the glass to create patterns of shadow and light along the surfaces. Various scholars recognize that the Hedwig glasses were likely made to emulate the rock crystal hardstone carving vessels made earlier in Fatimid Egypt, objects which have survived in church treasuries. Similar to the rock crystal vessels, a number of the Hedwig glasses were turned into chalices and reliquaries. In the Treasury of St. Mark’s Basilica in Venice, there are some rock crystal vessels which have been used to show Islamic influence on the imagery of the Hedwig glasses. Particularly notable, is a rock crystal bowl at the Treasury with a lion that is distinctly similar to those that appear on the various Hedwig glasses.

== Distribution ==
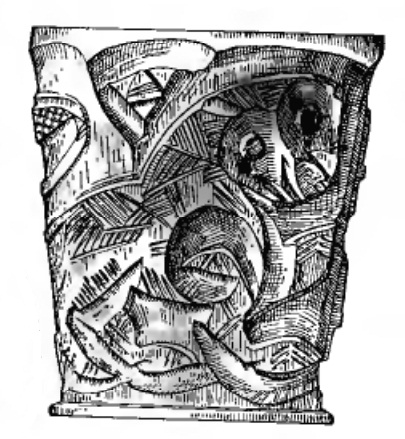
Fragment from Navahrudak, Belarus

The Hedwig glasses were clearly high status objects. According to Ettinghausen and Grabar, writing in 1987, so far no examples of this type of glass have been found in the Near East: "all the preserved pieces come from the treasuries of Western churches and noble houses". Small shards of broken Hedwig glasses have been found in excavations. In common with many Islamic objects imported into medieval Europe, they were credited with more antiquity than was in fact the case. The Amsterdam goblet carries the inscription: "Alsz diesz glas war alt tausent jahr Es Pfalzgraf Ludwig Philipsen verehret war: 1643" ("When this glass was a thousand years old, it was given to Ludwig Philipsen, Count Palatine: 1643")

As of 2009, 14 complete Hedwig glasses and ten additional fragments are known.

=== Complete ===
- British Museum, London, UK. Displayed in Room 34. BM Ref ME OA 1959.4-14.1, acquired in 1959, donated by P T Brooke Sewell.
- Rijksmuseum, Amsterdam, Netherlands. Ref BK-NM-712.
- Corning Museum of Glass, Corning, New York, USA.
- Germanisches Nationalmuseum, Nuremberg, Germany.
- Veste Coburg (Art Collections (Kunstsammlungen)), Coburg, Germany.
- Minden Cathedral, Germany.
- Schloss Friedenstein museum, Gotha, Germany.
- Halberstadt Cathedral, Germany.
- Krakow Cathedral, Poland.
- Wrocław (formerly Breslau) Museum, Poland.
- The Abbey of the Soeurs de Notre-Dame de Oignies, Namur, Belgium (two examples here).

=== Fragments ===
- Fragment from Bommersheim, Germany.
- Fragment from Göttingen, Germany (excavated at Ritterplan, the site of the destroyed castle in the centre of the city).
- Fragment from Navahrudak, Belarus.
- Three fragments from Hilpoltstein, Germany.
- Two fragments from Weinsberg, Germany.
- Fragment in the Budapest History Museum, Hungary, excavated from the former royal castle there. Inv. No 52.276.
- Fragment excavated from Brno (formerly Bruenn), Czech Republic.
- Fragment from South-west Russia.
- Almost complete glass from Nysa (formerly Neissen), Muzeum w Nysie, Poland.
- Fragments from Krymsk, Russian Federation at Azov Museum-Reserve.

The British Museum's example is a "Highlight" object and was selected as the 57th object in the series A History of the World in 100 Objects selected by British Museum director Neil MacGregor and broadcast on BBC Radio 4 in 2010.

== Saint Hedwig ==
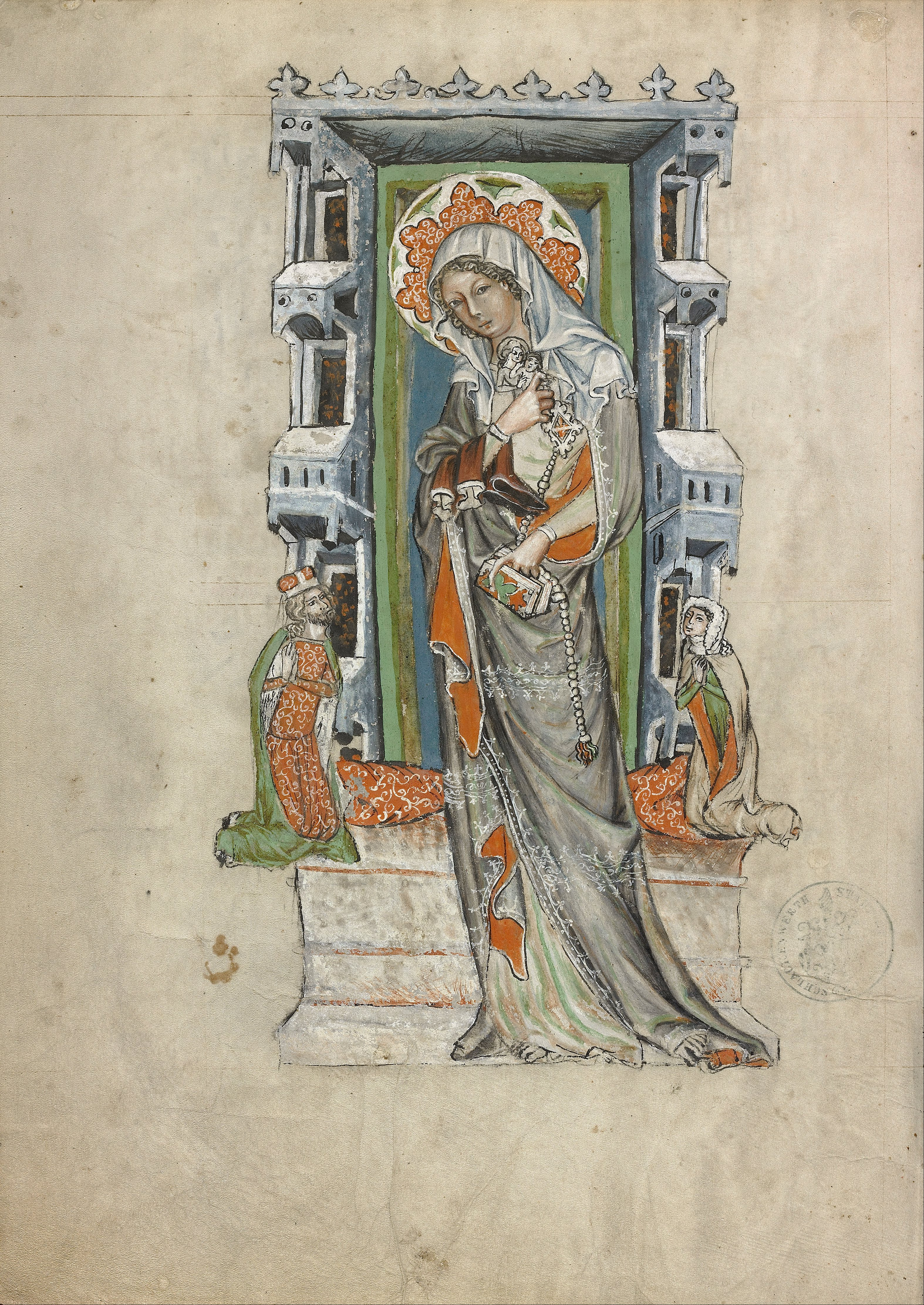
Saint Hedwig, from the Hedwig Codex (1353)

Hedwig glass derives its name from Saint Hedwig (ca. 1174–1243, canonized 1267), the Duchess of Silesia and High Duchess of Poland. According to the legend of Saint Hedwig, recorded in a manuscript from the court of Duke Ludwig I in 1353, she used the beakers for the miraculous transformation of water into wine. The direct association of the beakers with the miracles of Saint Hedwig lead the glass series to be highly sought after, with almost all of them being immediately absorbed into monastic and cathedral treasuries. The relation of the beakers to the Patron Saint of Silesia led to a quasi-relic status of the series, with six out of ten glasses transformed into chalices, ostensories or reliquaries indicative of their high-status within medieval treasuries. This elevated status led many to believe in their protective and healing abilities; the women of the House of Wettin regarded the beakers as an insurance of safe childbirth. Additionally, a Hedwig beaker seems to have come into the possession of Martin Luther, or his hosts; it can be seen in a drawing by the Cranach workshop of 1507, and is now in the Veste Coburg.

== Theories of their place of origin ==
Much scholarship in the last century discussed the Hedwig glasses, especially their elusive origins and iconography. Scholars have reached no clear consensus beyond the fact that the glasses must have been made at a distinct cultural crossroads that allowed Christian and Islamic elements to converge. Eugen von Czihak was the first to make the connection to Fatimid rock crystal hardstone carvings, suggesting the Hedwig glasses were made by Islamic glass- makers in Cairo and were brought to Europe during the Crusades. Czihak observed that the mould-blown glass technique used to make the collection of beakers would have been unknown to Europe at the time of production, thus making European origin unlikely.

The theory that it was made in the Middle East was continued by academics like Robert Schmidt and Carl Johan Lamm, however the proposal that the series came out directly of a Middle Eastern glass workshop was later contested because no fragments or sherds of the beakers have ever been excavated in the Middle East despite detailed archeological surveys of many glass workshops. The most recent proposal was made by Rosemarie Lierke in his book Die Hedwigsbecher (2005). Lierke argues that the vessels are of Sicilian origin, citing that the Christian city of Palermo housed many Islamic craftsmen who would have been trained to work with mould-blown glass. Lierke proposes that the Christian patrons and Islamic craftsmen of Sicily could have produced the imagery that mixes Islamic and Christian motifs, such as the Tree of Life. Furthermore, almost half of the glasses bear the Sicilian emblems of either lions, griffins or eagles, animals that were widely popular locally. While there has been no full consensus reached, it appears as though most scholars seem to lean towards the Middle East or the regions of the Mediterranean as being the plausible origins of Hedwig Glass.

In 2009, an archeological study was performed by the University of Gottingen, which compared samples of Hedwig glass, with soda ash glass from the Levant, and soda ash glass samples from Egypt, Persia, and Syria. The study found that the Hedwig samples were especially low in magnesium oxide, similar to the glass samples from the Levant. Meanwhile, the samples from Egypt, Persia, and Syria contained distinctly higher MgO concentrations, indicating that the origins of the Hedwig glass are likely the Levant. This study into the chemical composition of the glasses, has further assisted in discrediting the theories that attribute their origin to be Central Europe.

== Notes ==
Preceded by 56: Vale of York Hoard	A History of the World in 100 Objects; Object 57	Succeeded by 58: Japanese bronze mirror
