= Rosemarie Lierke =

German glass artist (born 1934)

Rosemarie Lierke, born Rosemarie Lindner (December 1934 in Berlin), is a German glass artist, trained mathematician and a researcher into the history and technology of ancient glass production. Some of her artwork is held in the Museum Kunstpalast in Düsseldorf, Germany.

== Biography ==
After graduating from high school in 1953 in Schnepfenthal, Thuringia, Germany, Lierke studied mathematics in Berlin and Cologne from 1953 to 1960. From 1962 to 1967, she was a research assistant at the Technical University of Aachen. She also began to work with enameling, for which she built her own kiln for high-temperature tasks.

In 1967, she moved to Toledo, Ohio in the United States with her husband, the physicist Ernst-Günter Lierke, and their two sons. At that time, Toledo called itself the "Glass Capital of the World." There she learned about the American studio glass movement and began making new artwork in glass, which she continued to do after she returned to Germany in 1970.

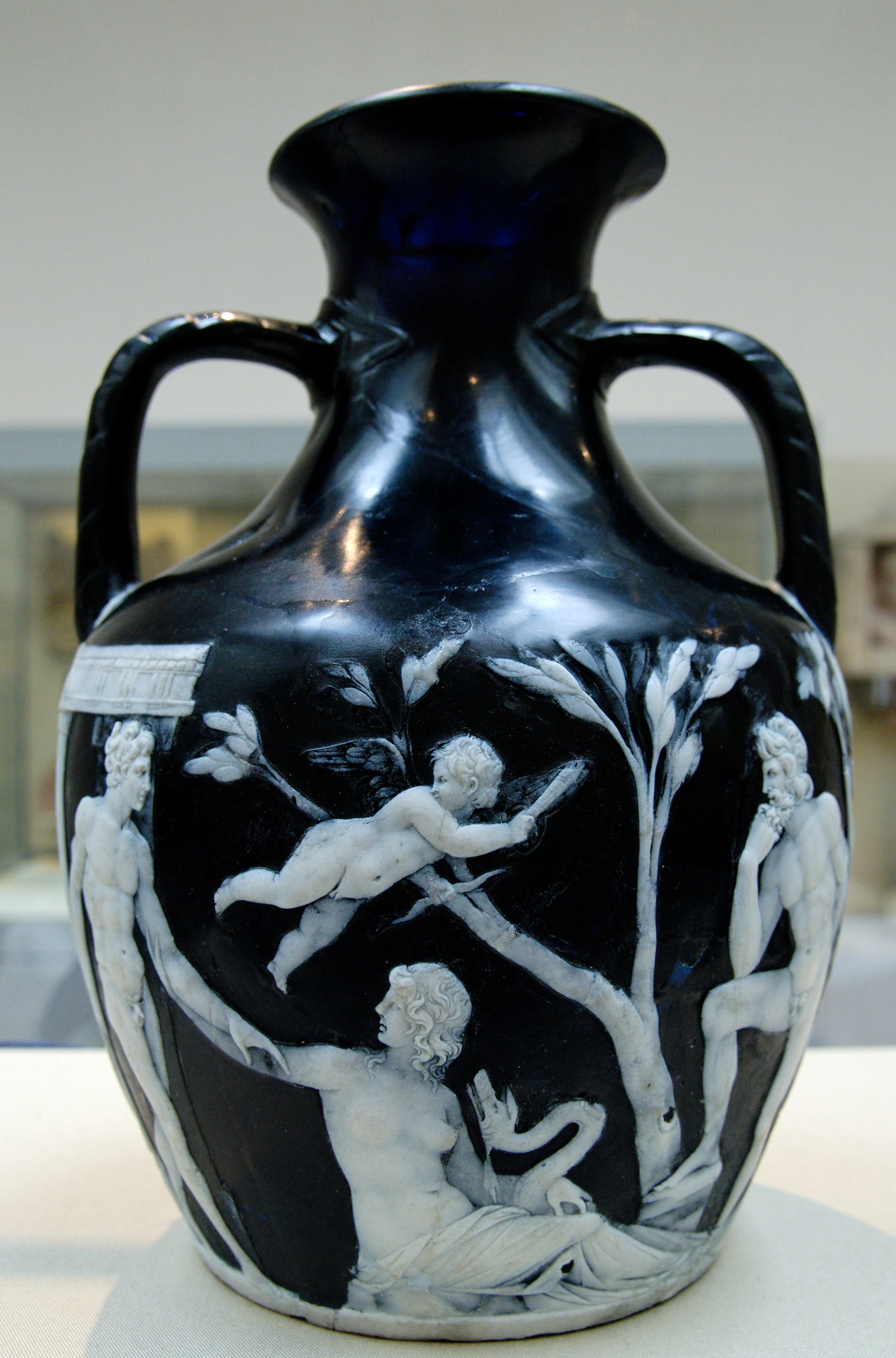
Portland Vase: example of cameo glass

From 1975 to 1979, Lierke worked as a mathematics teacher at the high school in Sulzbach (Taunus). From 1977 to 1987, she retreated to her glassblowing workshop in Schwalbach am Taunus, investigating lamp-working techniques and inventing a new craquelé technique, which she patented in 1979.

In 1987, she returned to the United States, this time going to Pasadena, California so her husband could conduct NASA-based research. She closed her workshop and intensified her scientific research into non-blown ancient glass vessels.

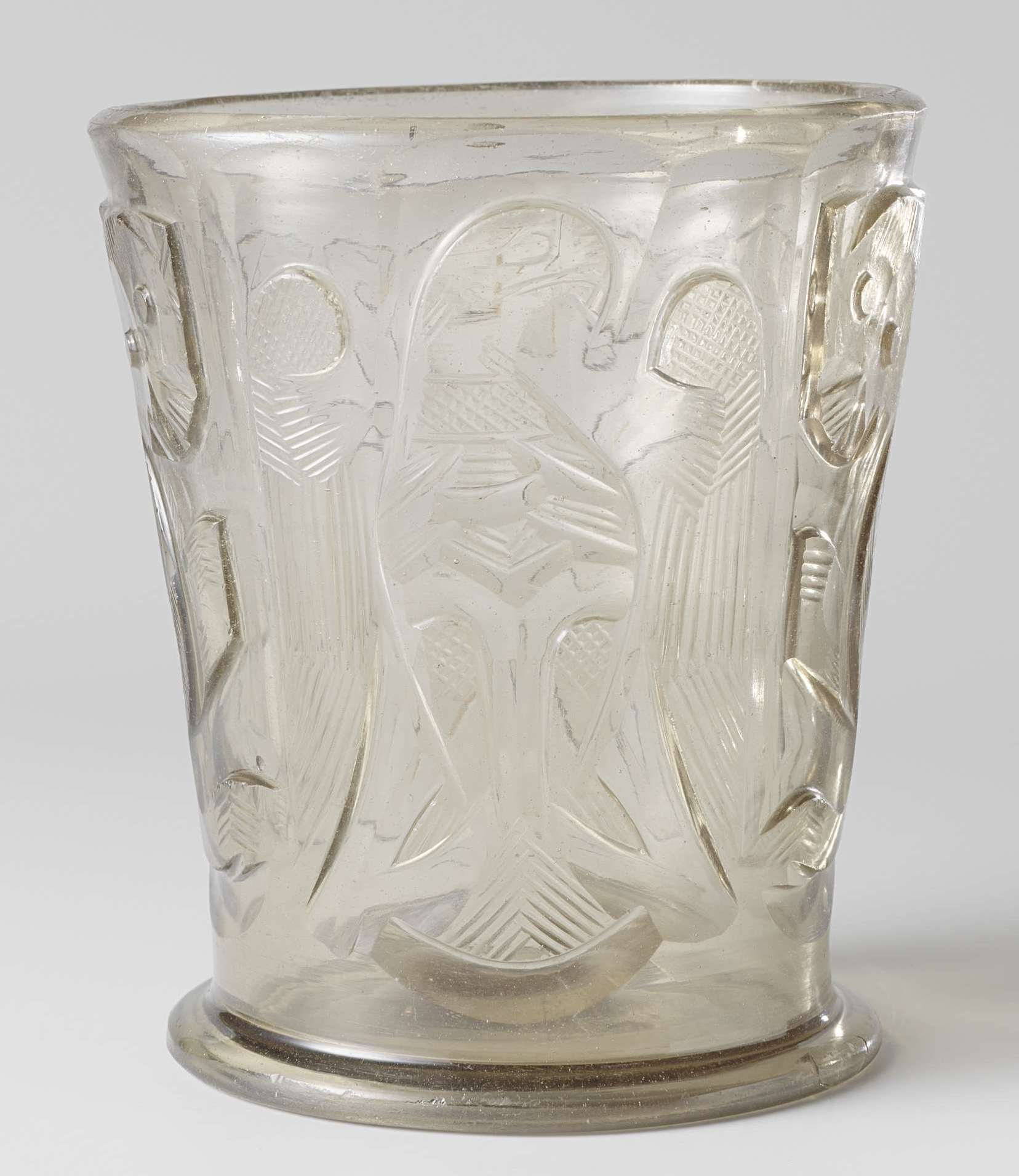
Sample Hedwig glass with eagle (Rijksmuseum)

Based on her practical work with glass and her study of ancient and medieval glasses, Lierke presented new ideas for the manufacture of glasses, especially cameo glass, the cage cup and the medieval Hedwig glass. Her work proved to be hotly debated and controversial in the scientific community.

To mark Lierke's 90th birthday, an exhibition of her works took place at the Bad Driburg Glass Museum from January to August 2025.

== Works in museums ==
- Cylinder vase with enamel decoration (1979), Düsseldorf, Museum Kunstpalast Inv. P 1979-5
- Vase, Düsseldorf, Museum Kunstpalast Inv. Gl 2006-208
- Vase Maigelein, Düsseldorf, Museum Kunstpalast Inv. Gl 2006-209
- Vase (1979), Toledo Museum of Art Inv. 1980.1014

== Selected publications ==
- Ancient Glass Pottery. A Forgotten Chapter in Glass History. With contributions by Matthias R. Lindig, Albrecht Locher, Hans Mommsen, Beat Rütti, Barbara Schlick-Nolte, Erika Simon, Cornelius Steckner, Eva Marianne Stern, and Carina Weiß. Philipp von Zabern, Mainz 1999, ISBN 3-8053-2442-1
- The Hedwig Beakers. The Norman-Sicilian Legacy of the Hohenstaufen Emperors. With a contribution by Rudolf Distelberger. Verlag Franz Philipp Rutzen, Ruhpolding/Mainz 2005, ISBN 3-938646-04-7
- Non-blown ancient glass vessels – their production from the beginnings to the luxury glasses of the Romans. German Glass Technology Society, Offenbach, Main 2009, ISBN 978-3-921089-48-4
