= Kesitah =

Ancient Biblical form of monetary measurement

The kesitah is an ancient Biblical form of monetary measurement of which the value or weight is no longer known. The word is translated from Hebrew meaning, "part, measure, piece of money."

== Biblical account ==
The word appears in Genesis 33:19 and Joshua 24:32 where Jacob paid 100 kesitahs for land near Shechem. The earliest Greek translation translated kesitah as "lamb". After God restored his fortunes, Job received a kesitah from each of his friends (Job 42:11). Subsequently, the kesitah was probably a piece of money of a particular weight, cast in the form of a lamb (or unminted of a certain weight, the price of a lamb).

== Archeology ==
Monuments in Egypt show that such weights were used as a form of currency.
