= Megiddo Treasure =

Hoard of jewelry pieces found in northern Israel

- Material: Gold and silver jewelry
- Created: circa 1100 BC
- Discovered: 2012
- Present location: Tel Megiddo

The Megiddo Treasure is a small hoard of jewelry pieces found in 2010, in a ceramic "beer-jug" at the archaeological site of Tel Megiddo, the location of the ancient city of Megiddo, in present-day kibbutz called Megiddo, Jezreel Valley, northern Israel. They date to around 1100 B.C.

== Jug ==
The treasure was contained in a "beer-jug". This type of vessel has a characteristic strainer, spout, and single handle. The handle was not recovered; it was likely made of a basket material attached to the rim, and so disintegrated over time. The beer-jug was the only such vessel found within the house where the treasure was discovered. It was subjected to molecular analysis at the Weizmann Institute to determine the contents, and was left unopened while awaiting the results. The exterior of such pottery vessels is normally analyzed to try to identify any substances that were absorbed into it. In this case, there were none.

== Contents ==
The treasure comprises the following items:

- A ring seal
- Nine earrings, one shaped like a basket with a large bird, possibly an ostrich or eagle
- More than 1,000 small gold, silver, and carnelian stone beads, wrapped in scraps of fabric

The contents were probably owned by a wealthy Canaanite family, likely belonging to the ruling elite. It has been dated to the time period just after the Egyptian Empire's withdrawal from Canaan around 1,130 BCE.

== Megiddo Expedition ==
The collection was discovered by the Megiddo Expedition, operated by Tel Aviv University and a consortium of American universities.
