= Treasure Act 1996 =

Act of the Parliament of the United Kingdom

Treasure Act 1996 (Note: Section 15(1).)
- Act of Parliament
- Parliament of the United Kingdom
- Long title: An Act to abolish treasure trove and to make fresh provision in relation to treasure.
- Citation: 1996 c. 24
- Territorial extent: England and Wales; Northern Ireland; (Note: Section 15(3).)

Dates
- Royal assent: 4 July 1996
- Commencement: 12 March 1997 (section 11) (Note: Section 15(2). The Treasure Act 1996 (Commencement No. 1) Order 1997 (SI 1997/760).); 7 August 7 (rest of act) (Note: Section 15(2). The Treasure Act 1996 (Commencement No. 2) Order 1997 (SI 1997/1977).)
Other legislation
Amends	Coroners Act (Northern Ireland) 1959; Ancient Monuments and Archaeological Areas Act 1979; Historic Monuments and Archaeological Objects (Northern Ireland) Order 1995
Amended by	Coroners and Justice Act 2009

Status: Amended

Text of statute as originally enacted

Revised text of statute as amended

Text of the Treasure Act 1996 as in force today (including any amendments) within the United Kingdom, from legislation.gov.uk.

The Treasure Act 1996 (c. 24) is an act of the Parliament of the United Kingdom, defining which objects are classified as treasure, legally obliging the finder to report their find. It applies in England, Wales and Northern Ireland.

== Provisions ==
The act is designed to deal with finds of treasure in England, Wales and Northern Ireland. It legally obliges finders of objects that constitute treasure (as defined in the act) to report their find to their local coroner within 14 days. An inquest led by the coroner then determines whether the find constitutes treasure or not. If it is declared to be treasure then the finder must offer the item for sale to a museum at a price set by an independent board of antiquities experts known as the Treasure Valuation Committee. Only if a museum expresses no interest in the item, or is unable to purchase it, can the finder retain it.

=== "Treasure" definition ===
For the purposes of the act, "treasure" is defined as being:

- All coins from the same find, if it consists of two or more coins, and as long as they are at least 300 years old when found. If they contain less than 10% gold or silver there must be at least 10 in the find for it to qualify.
- Two or more prehistoric base metal objects in association with one another.
- Any individual (non-coin) find that is at least 300 years old and contains at least 10% gold or silver.
- Associated finds: any object of any material found in the same place as (or which had previously been together with) another object which is deemed treasure.
- An object that would have been classed as treasure trove if found before section 4 came into force, that is: one substantially made from gold or silver but less than 300 years old, that has been deliberately hidden with the intention of recovery and whose owners or heirs are unknown.

Additionally, the act empowers the Secretary of State, by statutory instrument, to designate certain descriptions of items as treasure provided they are at least 200 years old, and also to designate certain descriptions of items to be excluded from the definition of treasure. As of 2023, as a result of such designations, ' "treasure" includes:

- Any prehistoric object containing metal, other than a coin, any part of which is precious metal or which is part of a collection of at least two such objects.
- Any object that "provides an exceptional insight into an aspect of national or regional history, archaeology or culture" due to its rarity in the UK, the part of the UK where it was found, or its connection with a person or event.

It excludes, unless they are treasure by virtue of the other designations by order:

- broadly, any object that can be assumed to be under the faculty jurisdiction of the Church of England due to being found on land it owns and controls;
- any object found within the precinct of a cathedral.

The act allows for a reward up to the market value of the treasure to be shared among the finder and the tenants and/or owner of the land on which the treasure was found. The amount of the reward and how it is divided among the claimants is determined by the Treasure Valuation Committee.

Successful cases involving the Treasure Act include that of the Ringlemere gold cup. Non-treasure finds are the remit of the Portable Antiquities Scheme.

== UK legislation ==
- Text of the Treasure Act 1996 as in force today (including any amendments) within the United Kingdom, from legislation.gov.uk.
- Code of Practice (DCMS)

== Scotland ==
The act does not apply in Scotland, where treasure finds are a matter of Scots Common Law.

== See also ==
- Hoxne Hoard
- Staffordshire hoard
- Vale of York hoard
- Scheduled Ancient Monument
- Treasure trove
