= Tell Keisan =

- תל כיסון (Hebrew) · تل كيسان
- Tel Kisson, Tel Kison
- Location within Israel
- 32°52′23.16″N 35°9′2.88″E
- Periods: Bronze Age, Iron Age/Phoenician, Neo-Assyrian, Persian, Hellenistic, Roman, Byzantine
- Location: Israel
- Region: Galilee
- Palestine grid: 164/253

Site notes
- Area: 15 acres (6.1 ha)
- Excavation dates: 1935-1936, 1971-1976, 19791980, 2002, 2005-2006, 2016-present
- Archaeologists: J. Garstang, J.-B. Humbert, David Schloen, Gunnar Lehmann

Tell Keisan, تل كيسان (Arabic name meaning "the mound of treachery") or Tel Kisson, תל כיסון (Hebrew name), is an archaeological site located 8 km (5.0 mi) from the Mediterranean coast in the Galilee region of Israel between Haifa and Akko. It lies northeast of the site of Tell Abu Hawam, west of the site of Horbat Rosh Zayit, well south of the site of Tel Kabri, and 7.5 kilometers southeast of the site now covered by modern Acre.

== History ==
The Galilee region is known for agricultural production, particularly olive oil. Tell Keisan is thought to have been a major granary for Akko. Tell Keisan is located off a branch of the ancient road of Via Maris which connected Egypt and Syria.

=== Early and Middle Bronze Ages ===
Tell Keisan was very large and prosperous in the early and middle Bronze Age. At this time it was fortified with a glacis and stone wall.

=== Late Bronze Age ===
In the late Bronze Age, the settlement was significantly smaller and a destruction level is distinguishable around the early 12th century BC.

=== Iron Age ===
It was rebuilt and reoccupied at the beginning of the Iron Age in the second half of the 11th century and appeared successful and "stratigraphically undisturbed." It is hypothesized that during the Iron Age it was a Tyrian enclave of Phoenicia. In the 8th century it was again destroyed and abandoned. Reinhabited in the 7th c. where there is archaeological evidence of Neo-Assyrian civilization. It was destroyed again by the end of that century.

=== Classical Age ===
It was reoccupied throughout Persian and Hellenistic periods and again abandoned in the 2nd century BCE. Strabo refers to the city of Acre as once a rendezvous for the Persians in their expeditions against Egypt. According to historians such as Diodorus Siculus and Strabo, King Cambyses II attacked Egypt after massing a huge army on the plains near the city of Acre. In December 2018 archaeologists digging at the site of Tell Keisan in Acre unearthed the remains of a Persian military outpost that might have played a role in the successful 525 B.C. Achaemenid invasion of Egypt. The Persian-period fortifications at Tell Keisan were later heavily damaged during Alexander the Great's fourth-century B.C. campaign to drive the Achaemenids out of the Levant.

There is archaeological evidence of Roman artifacts and a major road passing on the west side of the tell was paved during the Roman period. A church was built during the Byzantine period and lasted until the 7th century CE. The land of Akko changed hands between the crusaders and Arab army of Saladin a number of times in the 12th and 13th centuries, and Tell Keisan was used by Saladin as a base.

=== Later times ===
Incorporated into the Ottoman Empire in 1517, it appeared under the name Tall Kisan in the census of 1596 (or possibly 1548/9), located in the Nahiya of Acca of the Liwa of Safad. The village had 6 Muslim households, who paid a tax-rate of 16,6% on various products, including wheat (1950 akçe); barley (770 akçe); cotton (1200 akçe); occasional revenues (50 akçe); and goats and beehives (125 akçe); a total of 4,095 akçe.

Today the tell is located on a privately owned farm. A portion of the tell is currently a cultivated olive grove.

== Archaeology ==
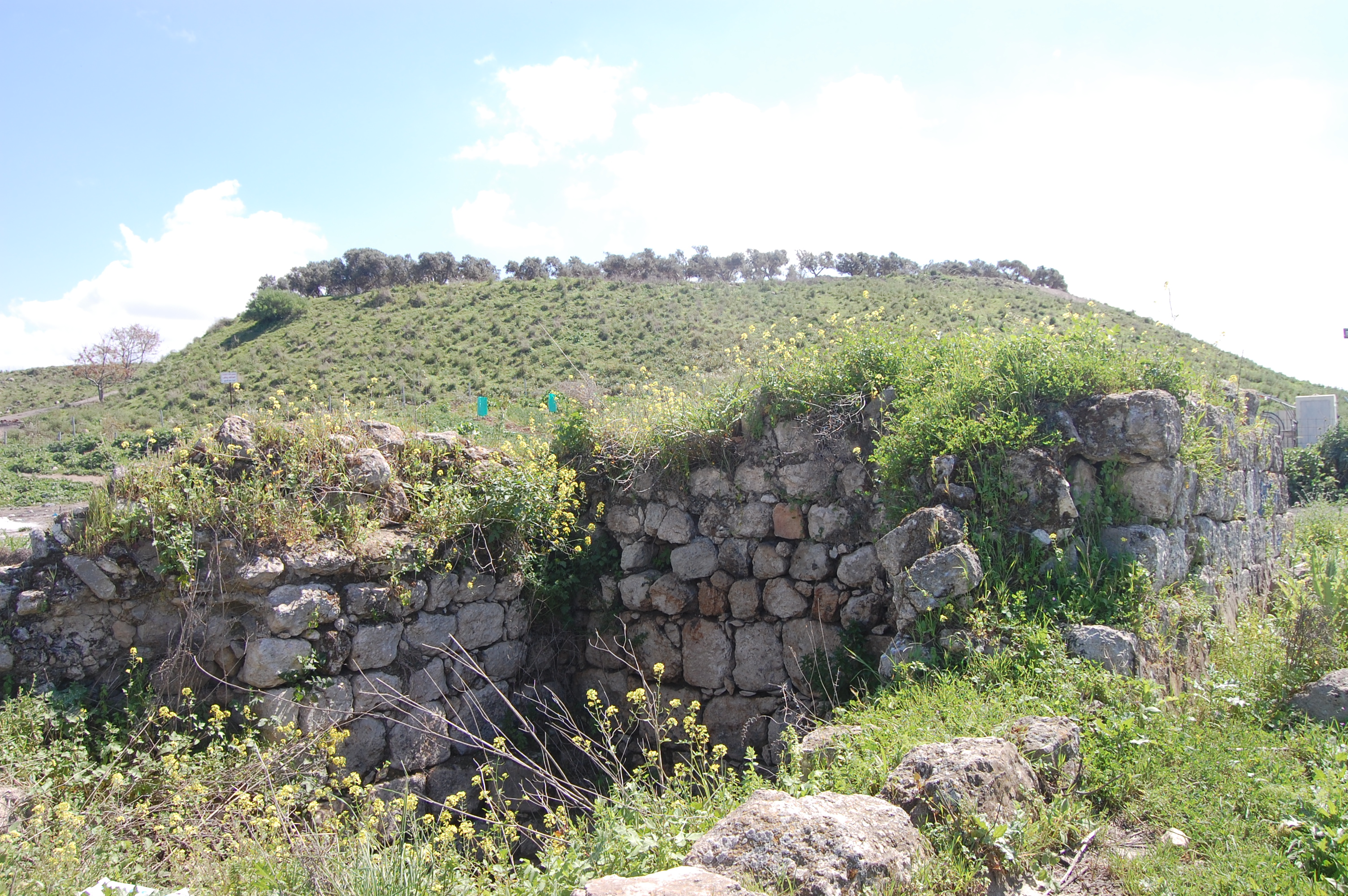
Ancient well at Tel Kison

The site of Tel Keisan is a mound covering an area of about 15 acres (6 hectares) and rising to 25 meters above the plain.

In 1881, the PEF's Survey of Western Palestine (SWP) noted: "Guerin gives the measurement of the mound at 350 paces in length from west to east, by 125 in its greatest breadth; it is about 130 feet high. It is ascended at the north and south by a kind of slope produced by artificial depression of the ground. The plateau on the top is covered with fragments of pottery, and among them cubes of mosaic; heaps of stones from buildings now destroyed are also scattered about. On this Tell Saladin had his head quarters during the siege of St. Jean d'Acre by Guy de Lusignan, Richard Coeur de Lion, and Philip Augustus."

The site was worked by the Neilson Expedition under the direction of J. Garstang and A. Rowe between 1935 and 1936. A large trench was dug finding remains dating from Early Bronze III to the Hellenistic period.

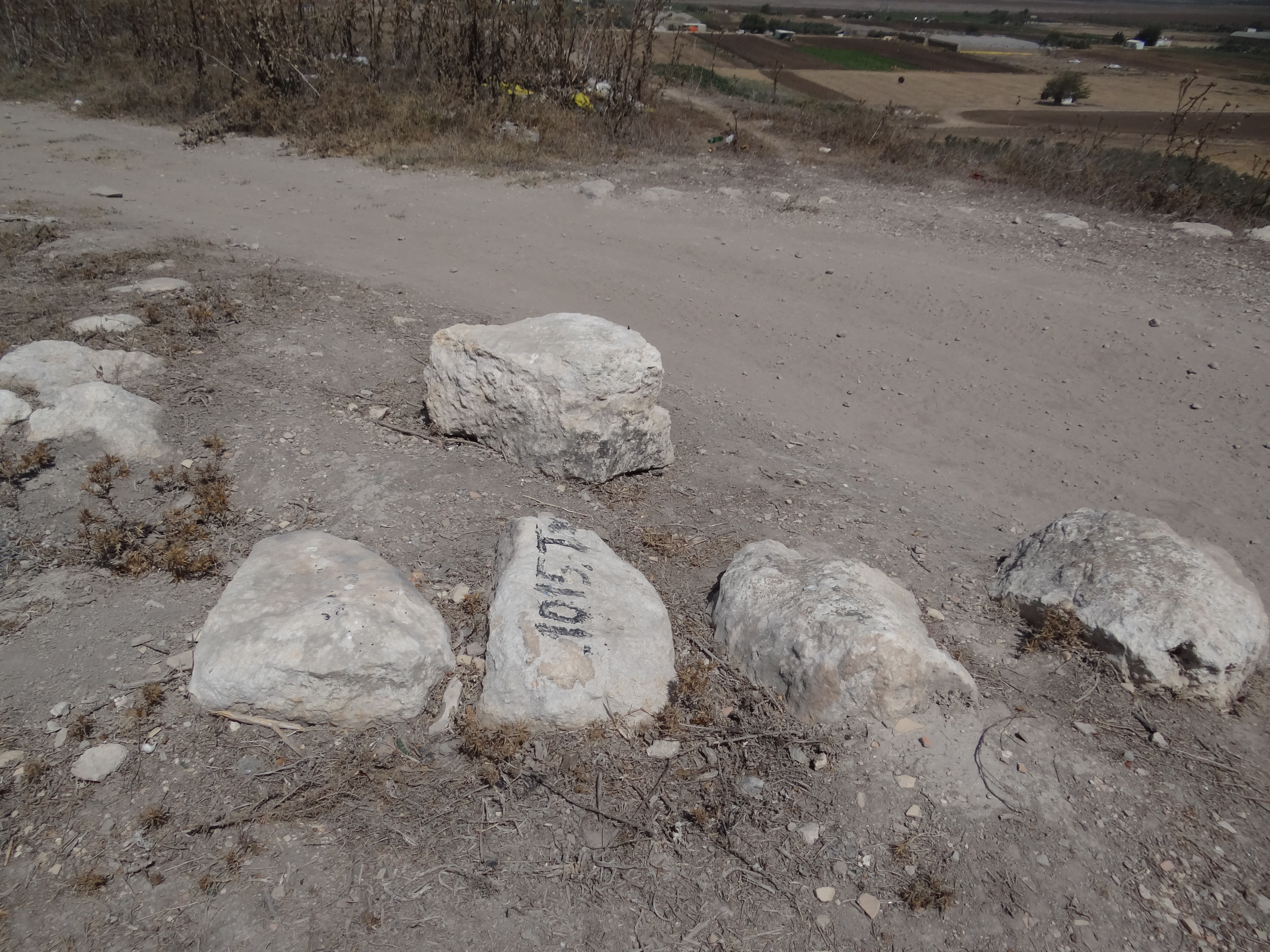
Ruins from excavation in Tel Kison

From 1971 to 1976 the site was worked by a team from the École Biblique et Archéologique Française in Jerusalem led by R. de Vaux, J. Pringnaud, J. Briend, and J.-B. Humbert. Excavation resumed in 1979-1980 led by J.-B. Humbert. A number of terracotta protome were found in Layer 4. A church and stone carving of a cross dated to the 6th century AD were found as well as a fragment of a Neo-Assyrian cuneiform tablet, a ration list. According to Pritchard, this excavation was of major importance to the archaeological understanding of the Iron age in this region. Forty four coins were found with periods ranging from the 5th century BC through the Islamic period.

In 2002 a rescue excavation was conducted north of the mound in response to the digging of trenches for a sewer. It was under the auspices of the Israel Antiquities Authority, with funding by the Municipality of Tamra, and led by Yotam Tepper. The trench ran 170 meters and included three excavation areas. The main area, A, was a 3 meter by 5 meter pit with a depth of 3 meters where Early Chalcolithic, Hellenistic, and Crusader-Mamluk layers were found. Finds included two coins of Antiochus III. In November to December 2005 a salvage excavation was done north of the mound on behalf of the Israel Antiquities Authority and led by Nurit Feig. Two 5 meter by 7.5 meter pits were dug (Area D and Area E) 20 meters apart.

Excavation resumed in 2016 by a team from the Oriental Institute (now ISAC) and the Ben-Gurion University of the Negev led by David Schloen and Gunnar Lehmann. In 2016 two pits were opened. On the western summit of the mound Area E (next to the 1970s Area B excavation) and on the southern summit of the mound Area F (5 meters by 5 meters). in 2018 Area E was further expanded to the south and a small square was excavated in the 1970s era Area B.

A few calibrated (INTCAL04) AMS radiocarbon dates from charcoal are available for Tell Keisan. Layer 13 was dated as beginning in 1237-1107 BC and ending in 1160-1034 BC, and Layer 9 beginning in 994-950 BC and ending in 949-917 BC.

=== Silver Hoard ===
Phoenician era Tell Keisan, particularly during the second half of the 11th century BC, is one of the find spots of silver hoards belonging to the Cisjordan corpus of hacksilber. The hoard was found in the courtyard of a domestic complex inside of a Phoenician Bichrome jug in Stratum 9a, Area B, L635. The hoard is the dated the earliest of the hoards in the Cisjordan corpus. The hoard includes cut ingots, sheets, wires, rods, jewelry, four linen wrapped bundles of hacksilber sealed with unbaked clay bullae, and loose fragments. The total weight of the hoard was 345g. Tell Keisan along with Tel Dor are the only locations in the Near East where bundles sealed with bullae have been found. The silver found here contains copper percentages, (19 ± 12.6%), that is much higher than naturally occurring amounts. Eshel et al. infers that this indicates that copper was intentionally added to the silver. This is one of the factors that causes Eshel et al. to refute the idea that the Cisjordan corpus was quality controlled. Two cloth samples with the hoard were radiocarbon dated to 1210–1010 BC (2915 ± 70 C14 years BP) and 1040–920 BC (2830 ± 45 years BP). Oxcal 4.2 was used for calibration.

=== Transport Amphorae ===
"Loop handle jars" are transport amphorae (Pithos) with two large handles that extend well above the lip of the jar. Dozens of loop handle jars were found in Tell Keisan. One variety of these jars, which were biconical shaped, dated to around 700-650 BC. L. Courtois (1980) determined through petrographic analysis that these pots could not have been made locally in Tell Keisan. Gunneweg and Perlman (1991) traced the clay used to make these pots back to Kalopsida in Eastern Cyprus. They established this through Neutron Activation Analysis (NAA), comparing the composition of pots from Tell Keisan to clays from various potential sources. The clays seen in Tell Keisan appeared in two types, buff pink and grey green. These two are in fact of the same chemical composition and vary in color due to oxygenation conditions during firing. This variation was stated to be typical of the clay source in Kalopsida. In their analysis they also refute previous claims that this variety of loop handle jars originated from Rhodes, based again on chemical composition. A similar NAA analysis of a Mycenae stirrup jar discovered on level 13 (c. 1200 BC) found it to be from Kouklia. It is also thought that the large quantities of bevel rimmed bowls, in comparison to other nearby locations, suggest a strong tie to Cyprus.

== See also ==
- Cities of the ancient Near East
